= Paulista Avenue =

Avenue in São Paulo

Coordinates: 23°33′41″S 46°39′23″W

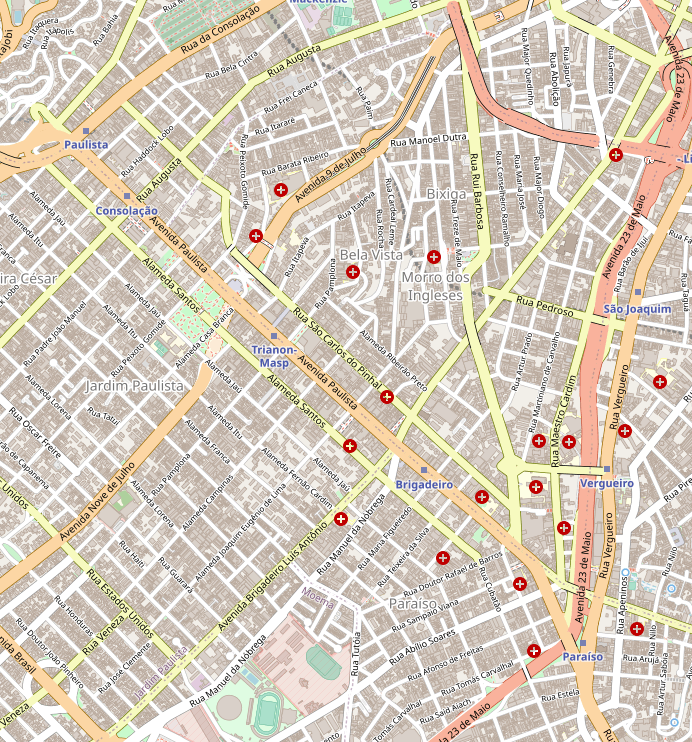
- Map
- Native name: Avenida Paulista (Portuguese)
- Length: 2.8 km (1.7 mi)
- Location: São Paulo, Brazil
- West end: Marechal Cordeiro de Farias Square in Consolação, São Paulo
- South end: Oswaldo Cruz Square in Vila Mariana, São Paulo

Construction
- Inauguration: December 8, 1891

Paulista Avenue (Avenida Paulista in Portuguese, Paulista being the demonym for those born in the state of São Paulo) is one of the most important avenues in São Paulo, Brazil. It stretches 2.8 kilometres (1.7 mi) and runs northwest to southeast. Its northwest point is Praça Marechal Cordeiro de Farias at its intersection with Rua da Consolação and its southeast point is Praça Oswaldo Cruz Praça Oswaldo Cruz at its intersection with Treze de Maio, Bernardino de Campos, Desembargador Eliseu Guilherme, and Dr. Rafael de Barros avenues. Major crossroads on the street are Rua Augusta, Rua Haddock Lobo (São Paulo) and Avenida Brigadeiro Luís Antônio. Parallel to it are Cincinato Braga, Joaquim Eugenio de Lima on the Bela Vista/Paraíso side and Alameda Santos and Coronel Oscar Freire on the Jardins side. Paulista Avenue crosses sections of the neighborhoods of Paraíso (bairro de São Paulo), Jardim Paulista, Cerqueira César (bairro de São Paulo) and Jardim América (bairro de São Paulo), ending in Higienópolis.

The headquarters of many financial and cultural institutions are located on Paulista Avenue. As a symbol of the center of economic and political power of São Paulo, it has been the focal point of numerous political protests beginning in 1929 and continuing into the 21st century. It is also home to an extensive shopping area and to South America's most comprehensive fine-art museum, the São Paulo Museum of Art. Being one of the highest points in São Paulo, it is clustered with radio and television masts, most notably that of TV Gazeta. Paulista Avenue is a major hub of the subway and bus lines of the city.

== Overview ==
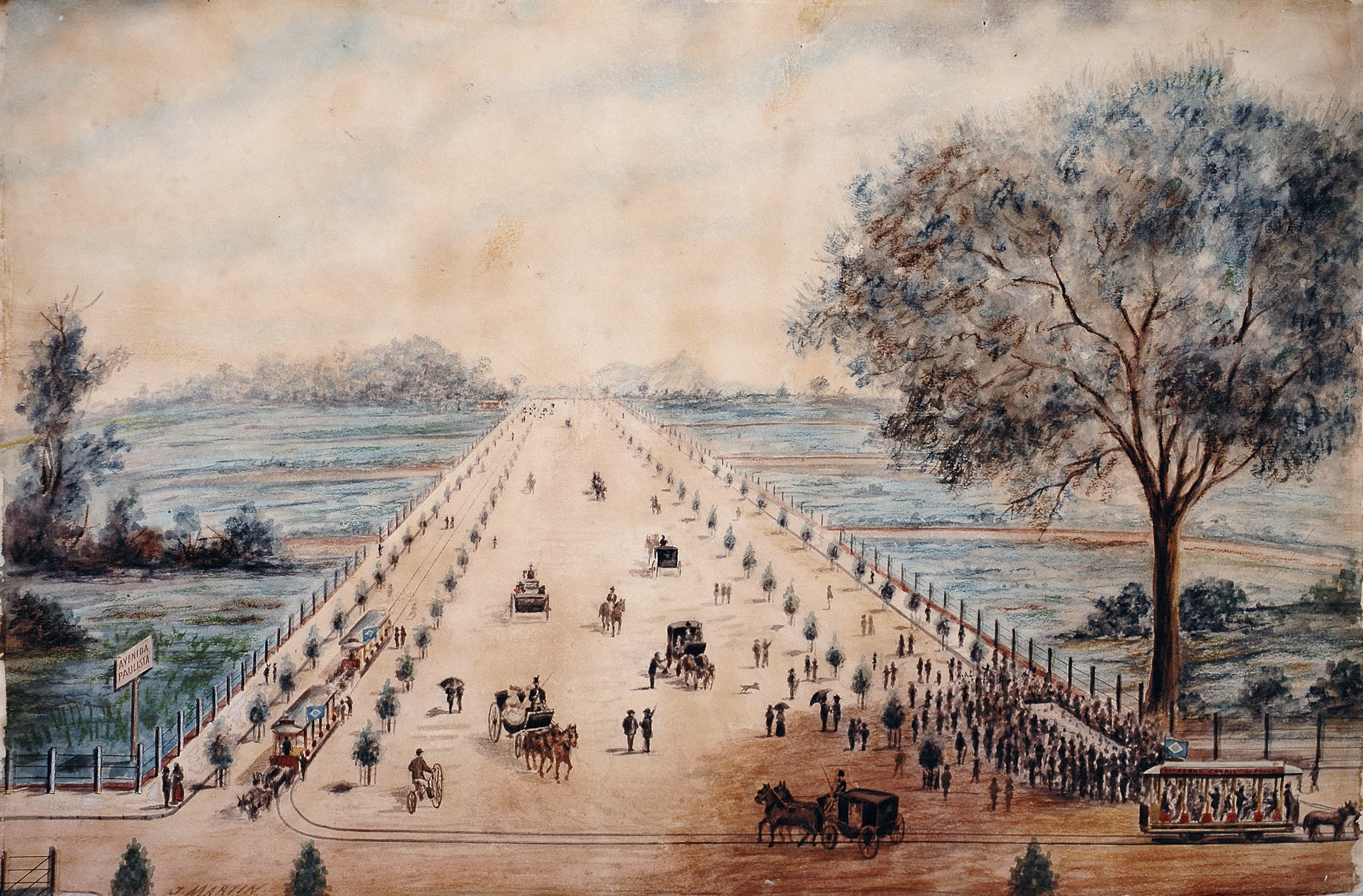
First painting of Avenida Paulista, by Martin Jules.

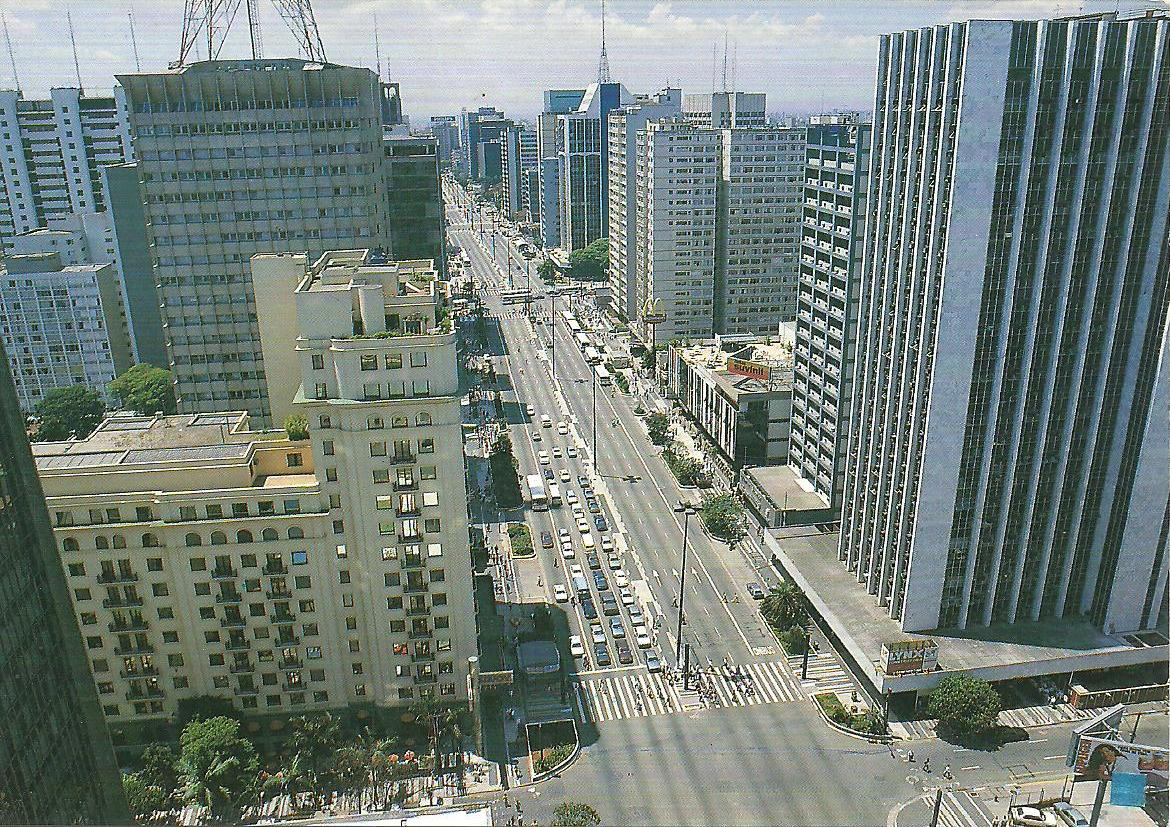
Paulista Avenue in 1994

=== Construction ===
Paulista Avenue was constructed in 1891 by Joaquim Eugênio de Lima (1845-1902), a Uruguayan-Brazilian civil engineer. Once a residential neighbourhood thoroughfare flanked by lavishly ornate mansions with Arabesque and European themes of the city's coffee barons and industry entrepreneurs such as the Matarazzo family. Paulista Avenue Number One belonged to the Von Bülow family, founders and operators of the Antarctica brewery. It became the first paved street in São Paulo in 1909. Asphalt was imported from Germany to complete the project.

A master plan for the avenue titled Plano de Avenida (English: Avenue Plan) was devised by Mayor Francisco Prestes Maia in 1930 during the regime of President Getúlio Vargas. It was based on David Burnham's master plan for Chicago, and attempted to control urban growth of São Paulo. The plan promoted the decentralization of urban areas, development of automobile routes, and construction low-cost and high-density housing. The first multi-story building on the avenue was a seven-story structure at the corner of Paulista and Frei Caneca constructed in 1939. The most important of the ones which still stand to this day is Casa das Rosas, near Praça Osvaldo Cruz in the very beginning of the long avenue. It was turned into a cultural center in the late 1980s. The house has oil/hydraulic heat radiators, a luxury only the millionaire could afford.

=== Modernization ===
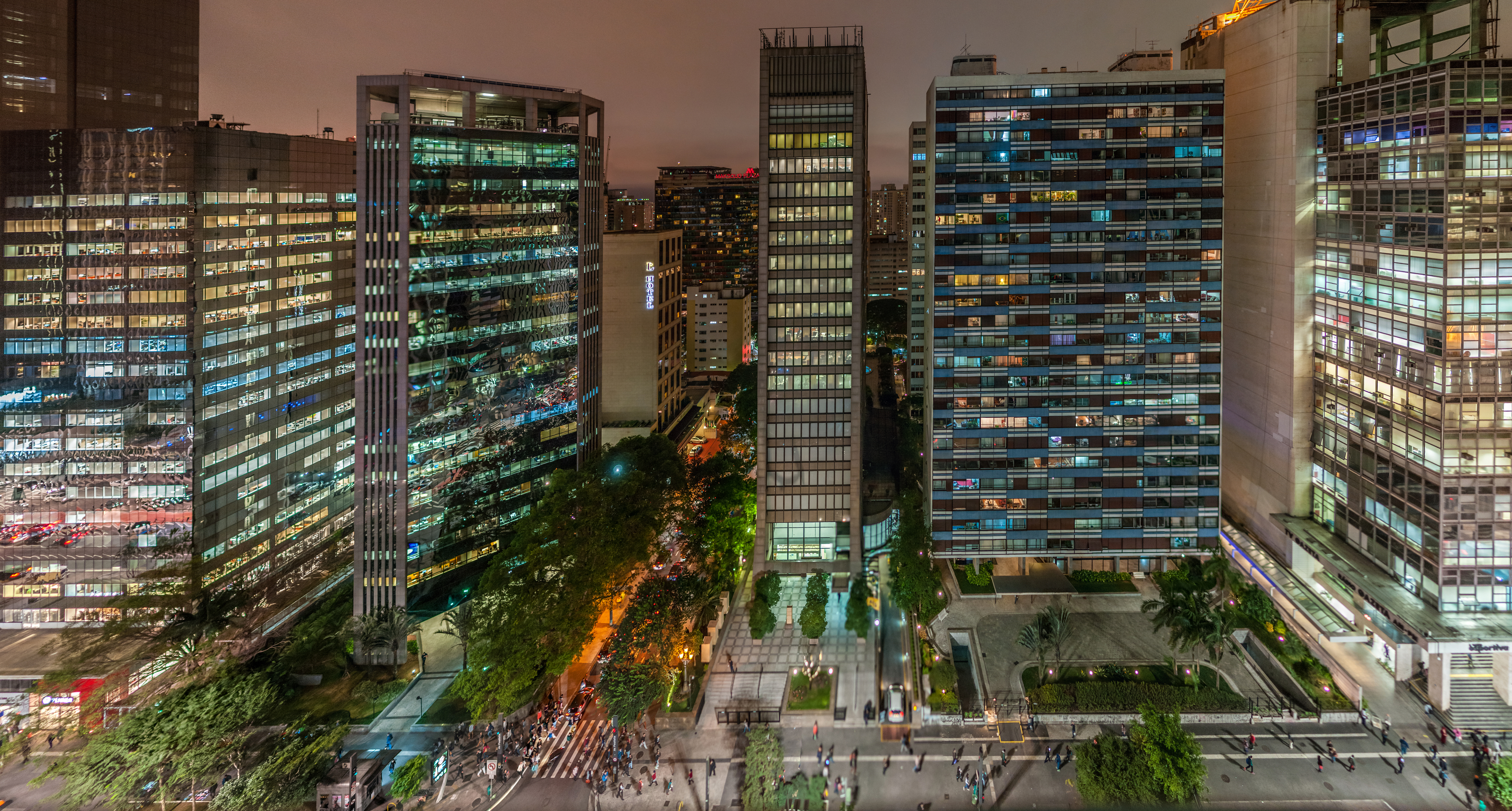
Avenida Paulista at night.

Paulista Avenue underwent a massive renovation and verticalization effort beginning in the 1950s, a trend that followed president Juscelino Kubitschek's vision of rapid economic expansion of Brazil. Developers pressured legislators to allow for the removal of Neoclassical, Hindu-style and Middle Eastern structures along the street. These and other buildings were torn down overnight to avoid popular resistance. The avenue became home to financial institutions and it became a symbol of the economic power of the State of São Paulo. The concentration of commerce on Paulista Avenue in the 1950s attracted a new population of middle class residents in the area, both at the expense of the city's historic downtown area. The change in economic, social, and cultural status of São Paulo, as exemplified by Paulista Avenue, attracted migration from poorer areas of Brazil and the subsequent appearance of favelas at the perimeter of the city.

Paulista Avenue again underwent significant structural renovation in 1972. The "Novo Paulista" (English: New Paulista) master plan of Mayor José Vicente Faria Lima significantly increased the vehicle capacity from 20,000 vehicles per day to more than 100,000 at present. All trees along the avenue, numbering 182 on the right and 140 on the left, were declared eyesores and the trees were removed to accommodate the increase in transportation routes. Current trees on the avenue, which are in number 390, are the result of replanting between 2007 and 2008.

== Transportation ==
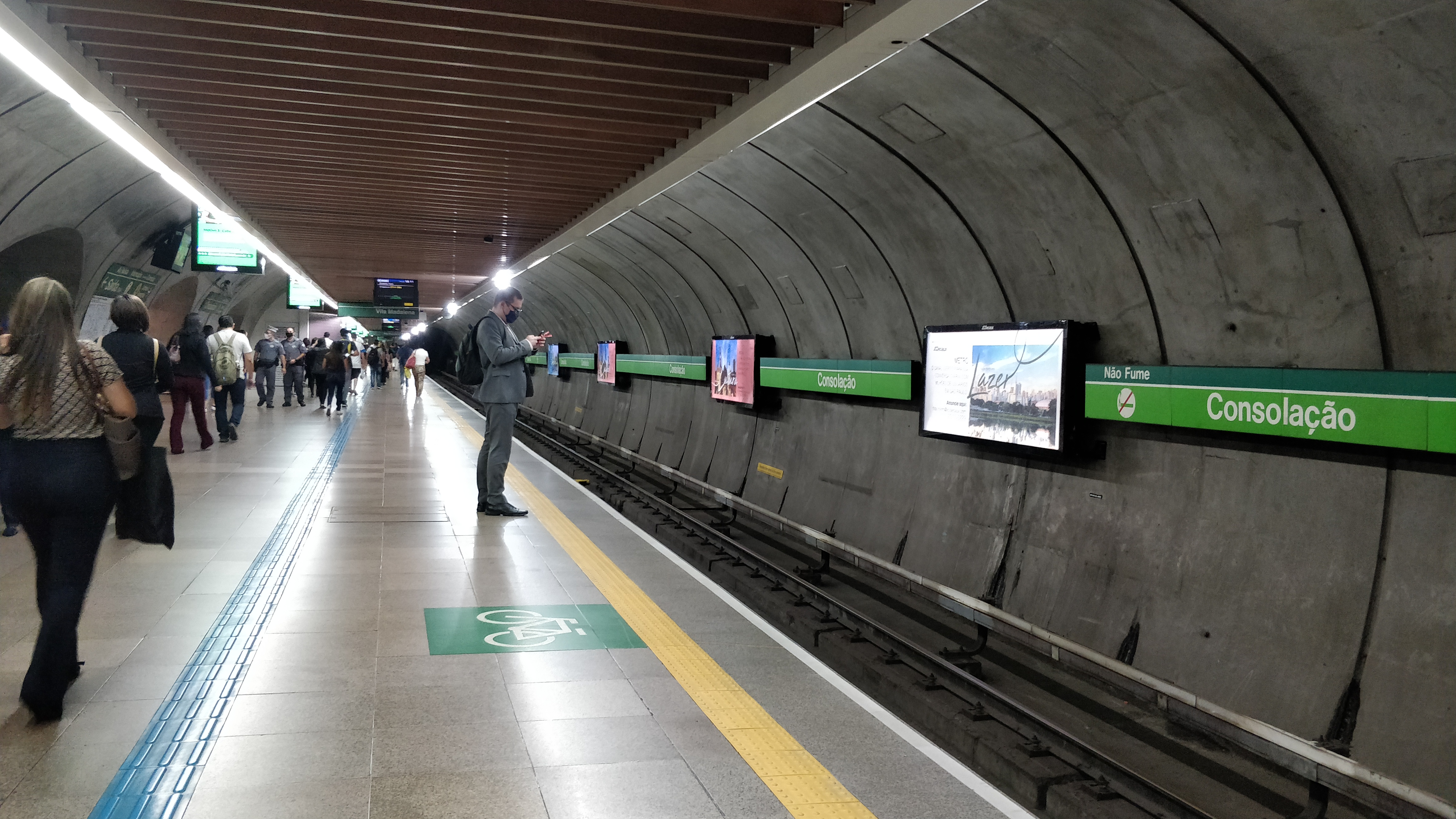
Consolação station of São Paulo Metro

It is estimated that more than 800,000 commuters transit Avenida Paulista daily. The avenue is served by the city's subway system, with the Line 2 (Green Line) of the Metrô (São Paulo's Metro system) running underneath the avenue from one end to the other. This line connects the East and West sides of the metropolis having transfers to the Line 1 (Blue Line), the Line 4 (Yellow Line), the Subway Line 5 (Lilac Line) to the south side, the train Line 10 (Turquoise Line) and the monorail line 15 (Silver Line).

== Points of interest ==
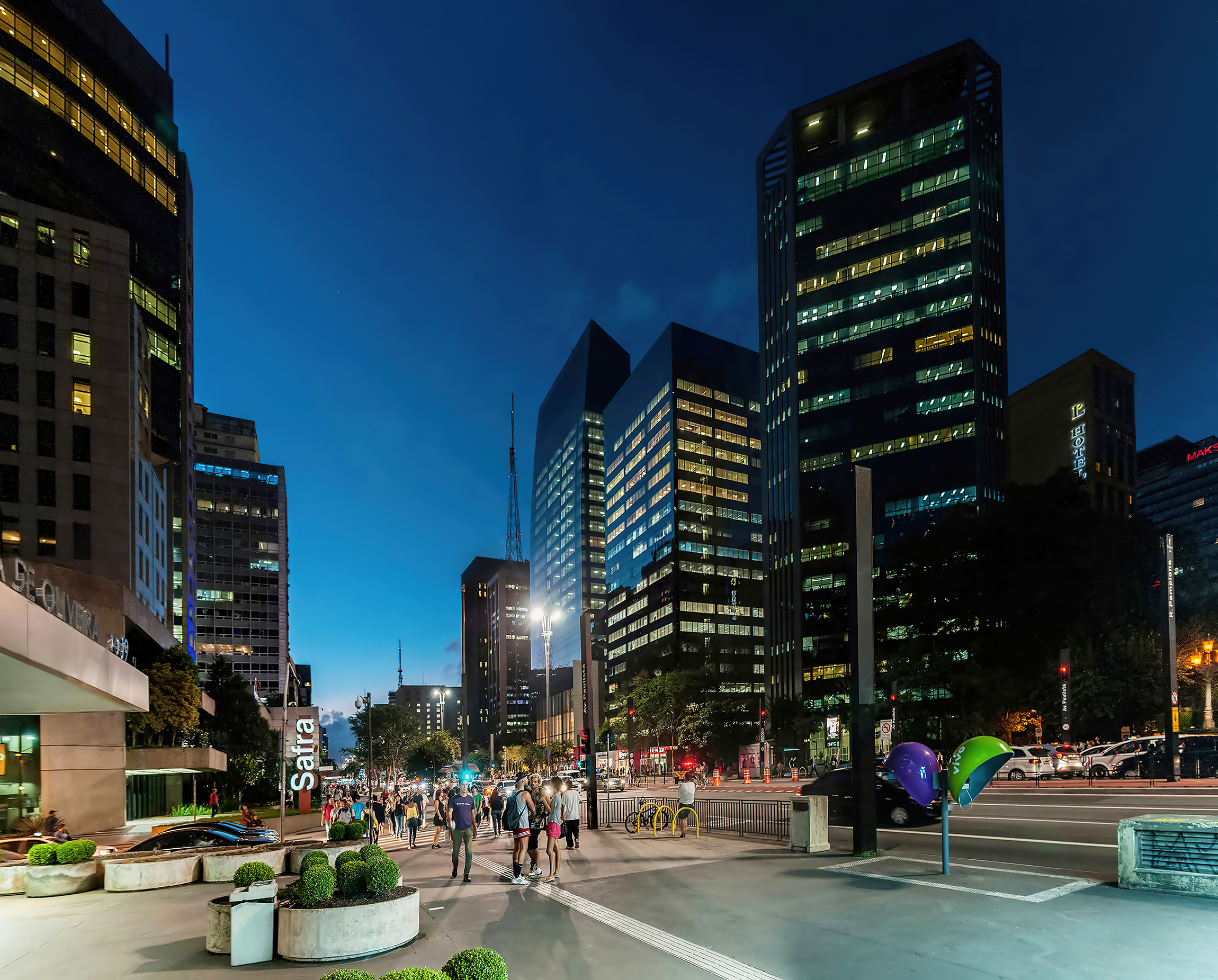
Buildings on the avenue

Paulista is home to a small native forest park, the Parque Siqueira Campos (English: Siqueira Campos Park), commonly called Trianon, and to the São Paulo Museum of Art (MASP - Museu de Arte de São Paulo). MASP is known for its expansive collection of European and national paintings, sketches, and sculptures by Renoir, Picasso and Modernist Brazilian authors, and for the modern architecture of its building, whose exhibition room is made of a single block of concrete and glass windows suspended and supported by two vertical concrete columns, in order to maintain sightlines to 9 de Julho Avenue and the Cantareira mountain range north of the museum. The empty space or vault covered by cobblestones is used by the Feira de Antiguidade—Antique fair—every Sunday, open movie projections and other cultural and public events. Dedicated in 1968 by Queen Elizabeth II of the United Kingdom, MASP is, due to conformity, a city landmark.

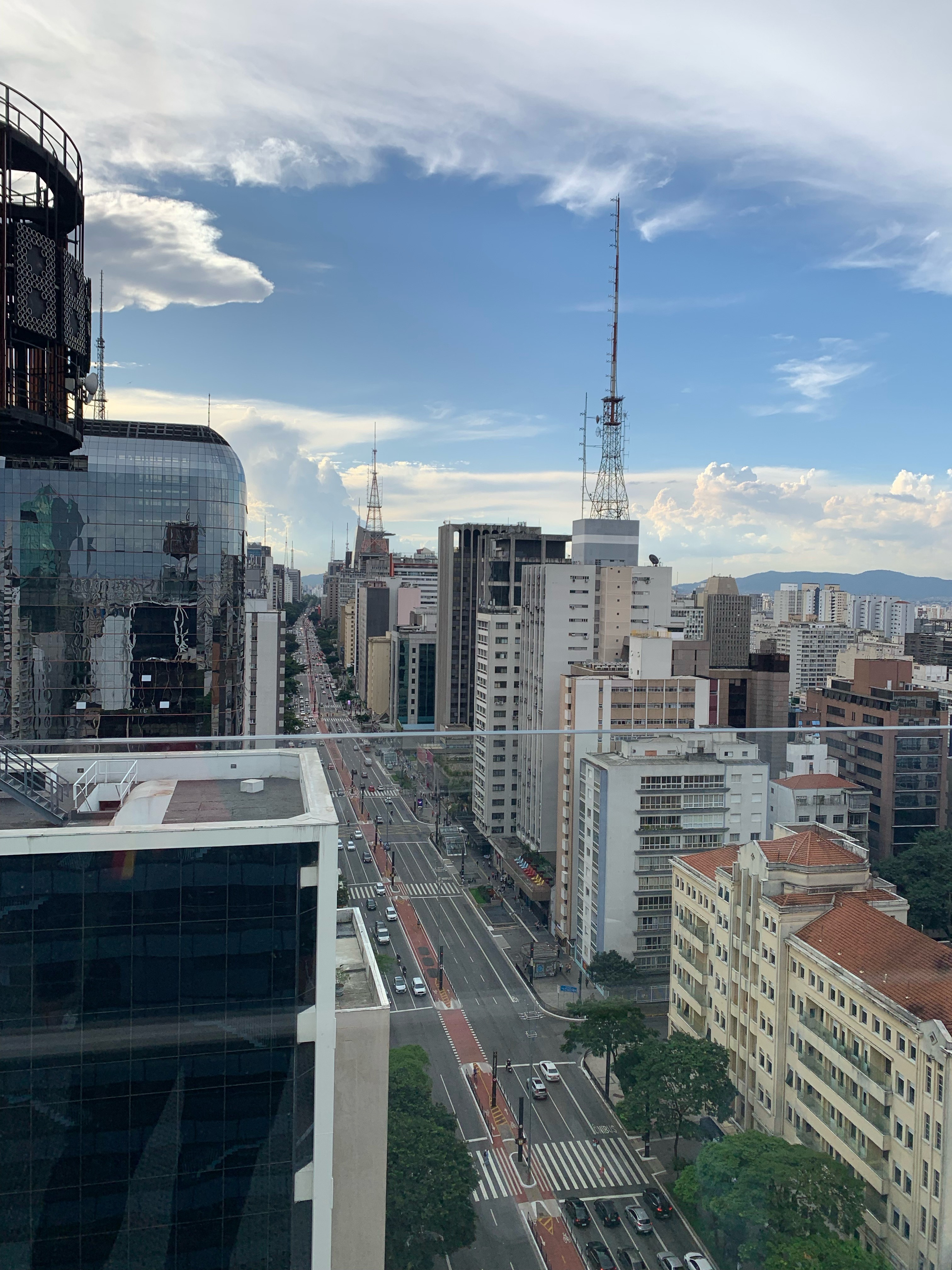
Paulista Avenue as seen from SESC Building observatory

The São Paulo Gay Pride Parade in May/June, the largest in the world, and the Saint Silvester Road Race on New Year's Eve take place on this avenue annually. Celebrations of local soccer teams, World Cup championships and political demonstrations also have Paulista as a stage.

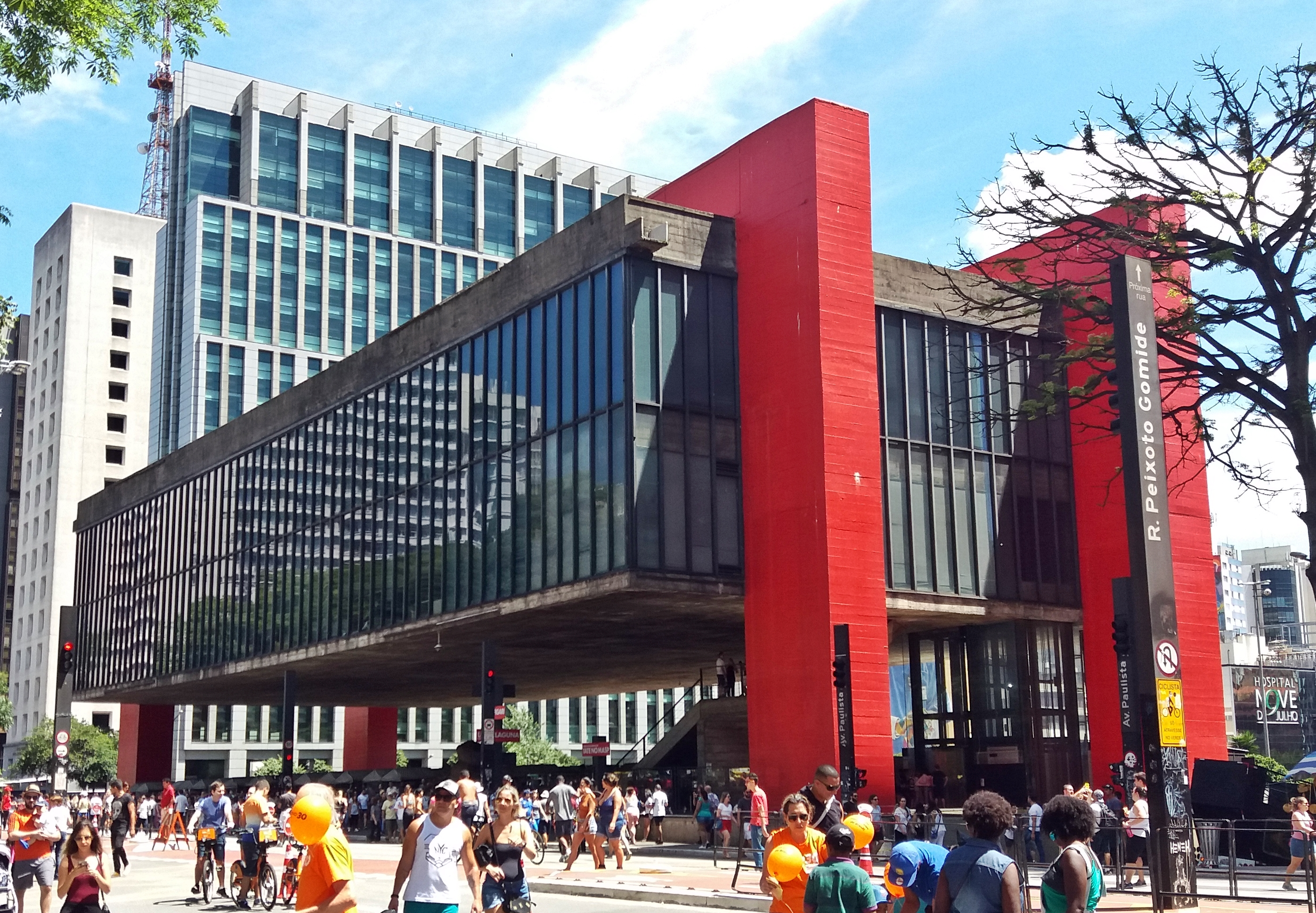
São Paulo Museum of Art, one of the city's most controversial architectural landmarks

The avenue is also renowned for excellent private schools such as Maria Imaculada school for girls; the Anglican Saint Paul's school; Dante Alighieri private school, Alumni English Language Institute, São Luis University and School, Casa di Cultura Italiana, and Objetivo Preparatory School. The Rodrigues Alves public school, in front of Hospital Santa Catarina, is housed in a yellow neo-classic building.

Numerous cultural centers line Paulista Avenue. The Centro Cultural Itaú near Casa das Rosas in Paraiso, is an exhibition space; Centro Cultural FIESP/CIESP is an exhibition space of arts and crafts. Centro Cultural FIESP/CIESP also houses the Teatro Brasileiro de Comedia, which distributes free tickets for its weekly performances. Some of the São Paulo's best hospitals are located in the Paulista Avenue area; they include Hospital Alemão Osvaldo Cruz, Paulistano, Clínicas, Emilio Ribas and Beneficência Portuguesa. Large-scale shopping malls on the street, some of which are now designated historic buildings, include Center Três, Conjunto Nacional, Grande Avenida, Gazeta, Top Center and Shopping Pátio Paulista. They are noted for their coffee shops, internet facilities, restaurants, luncheonettes, shops, and movie theaters. Some of the remaining historic mansions and banks are decorated during the Christmas season, and draw crowds for picture taking.

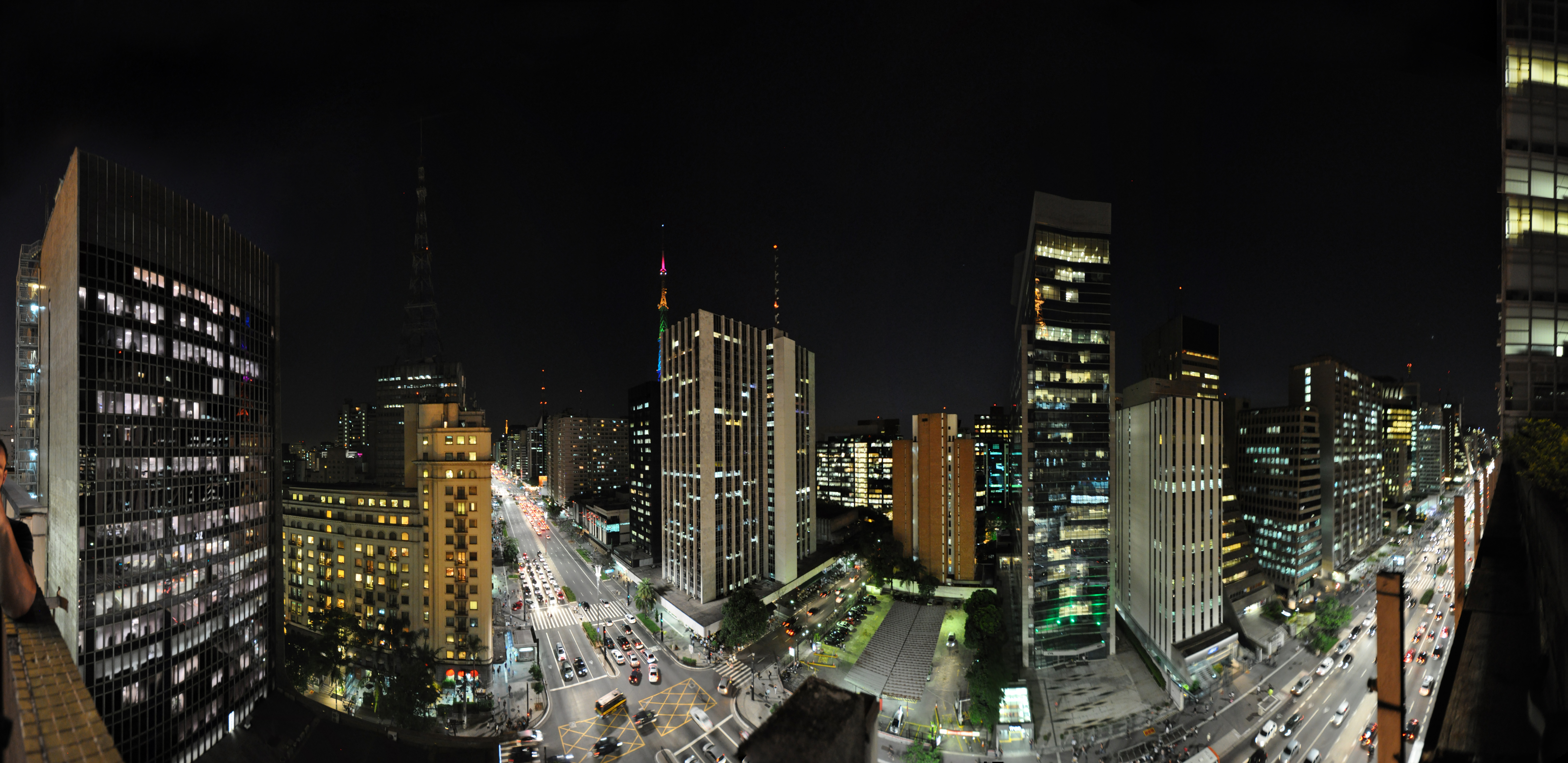
Panorama of Paulista Avenue

== Image gallery ==
Buildings

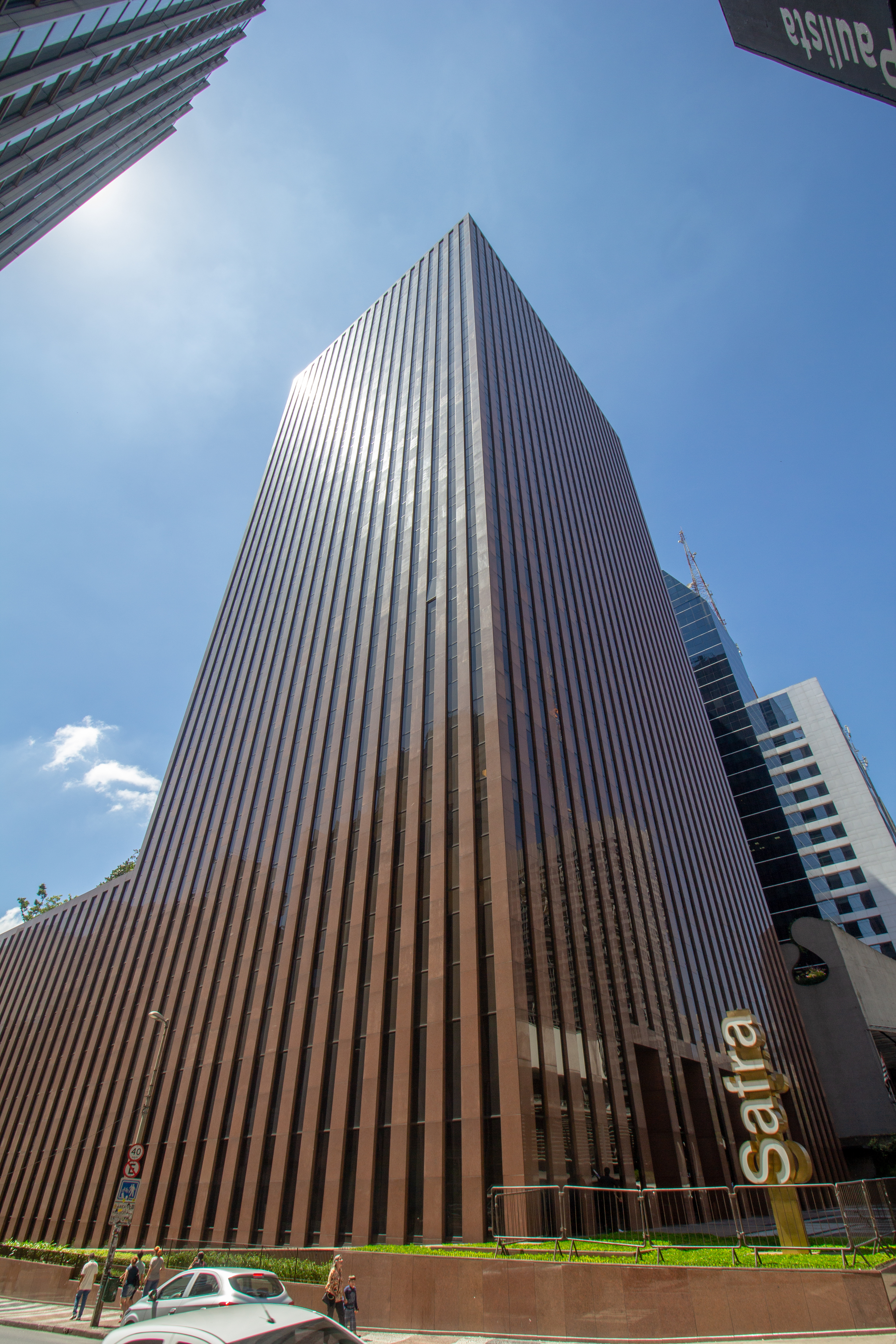
Safra bank's headquarters (Safra Group).

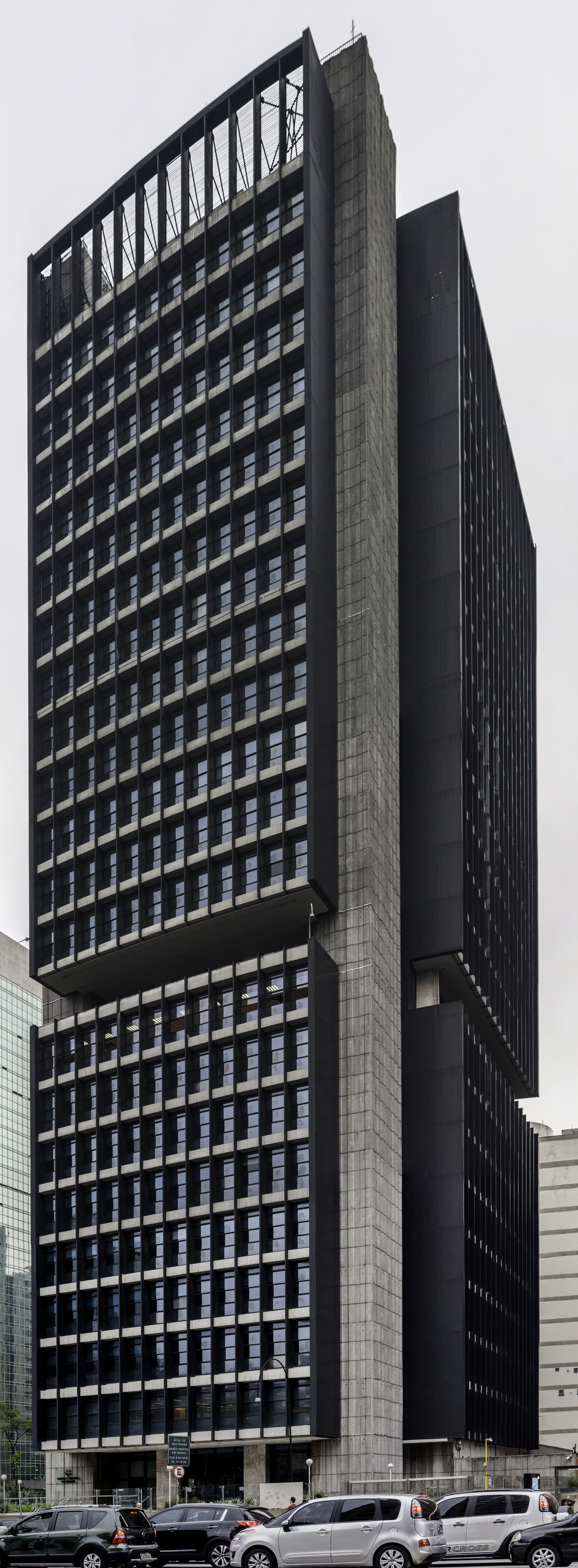
Banco Central do Brasil Building.

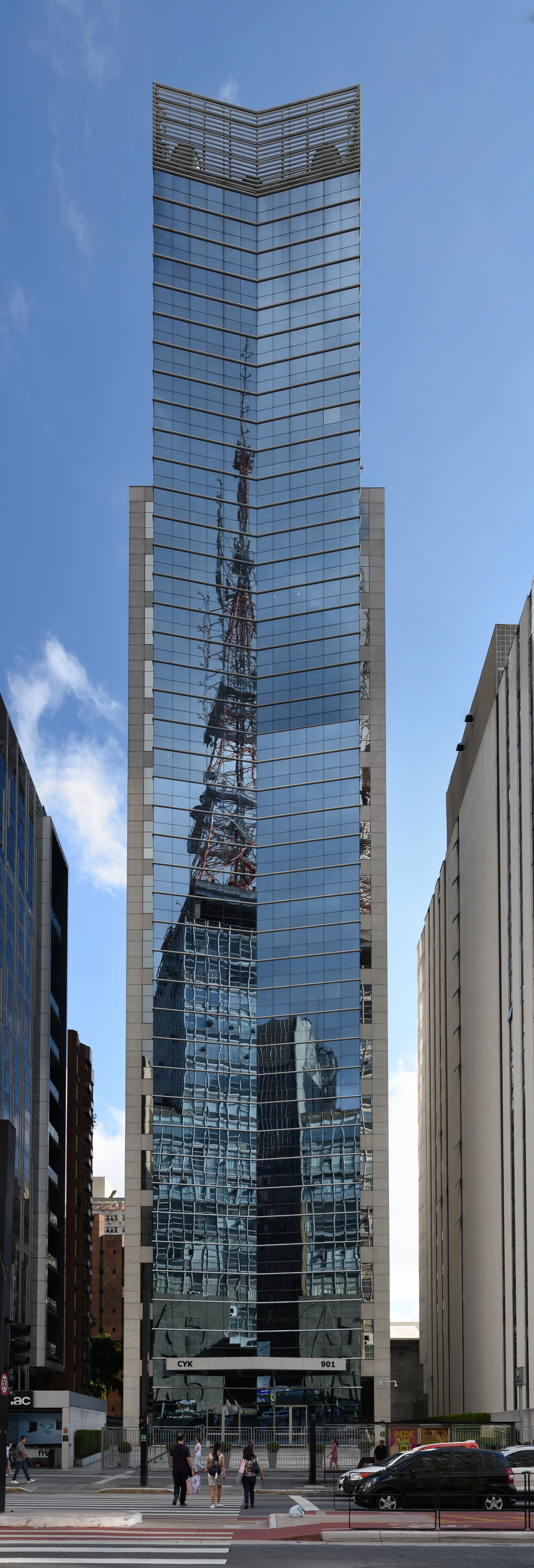
Reflection of one of the towers of the avenue in the building of Petrobras.

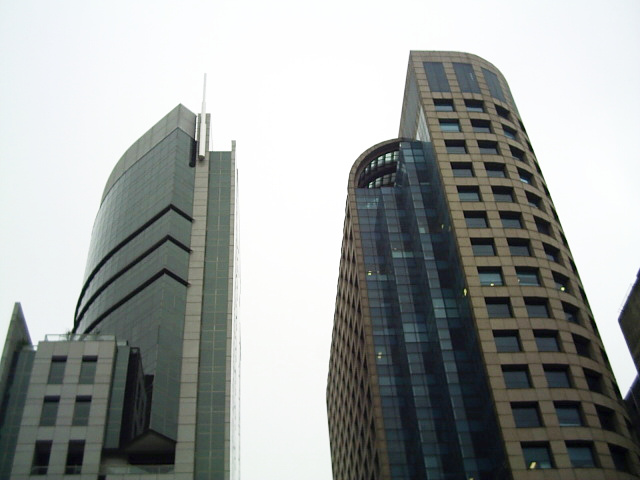
The Buildings in Paulista Avenue. On the right, Citibank's headquarters in Brazil.

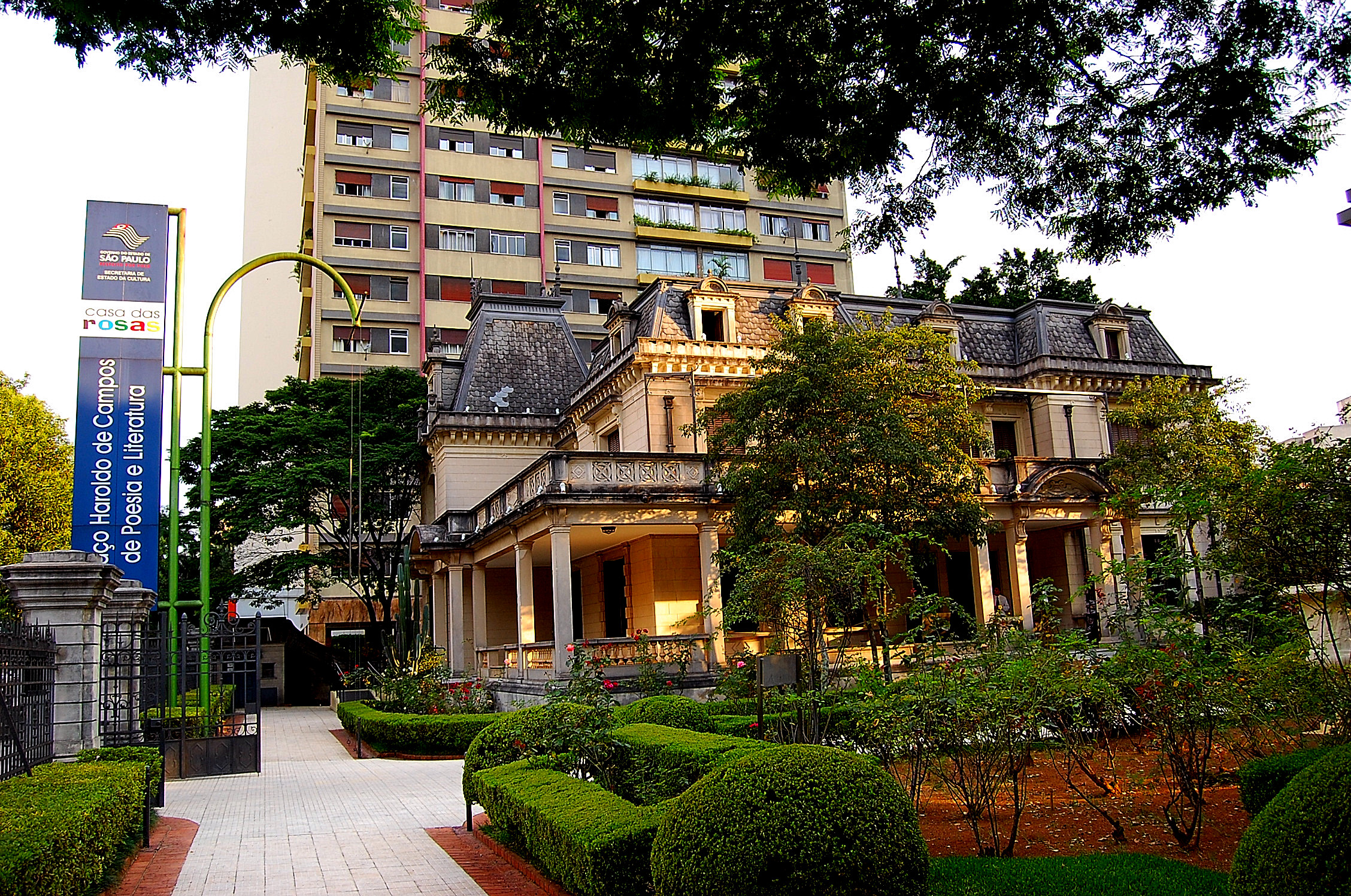
Casa das Rosas.

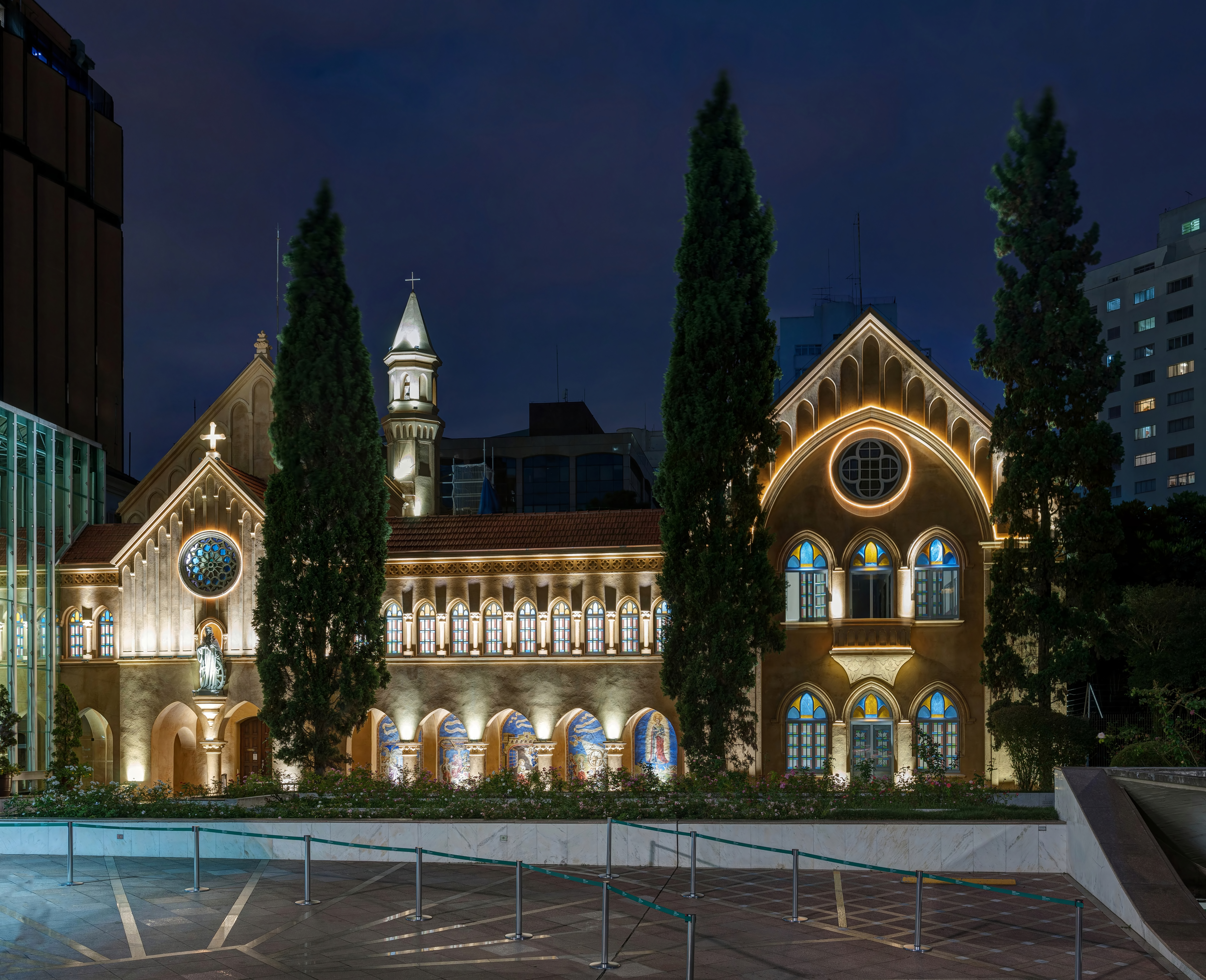
Santa Catarina Hospital

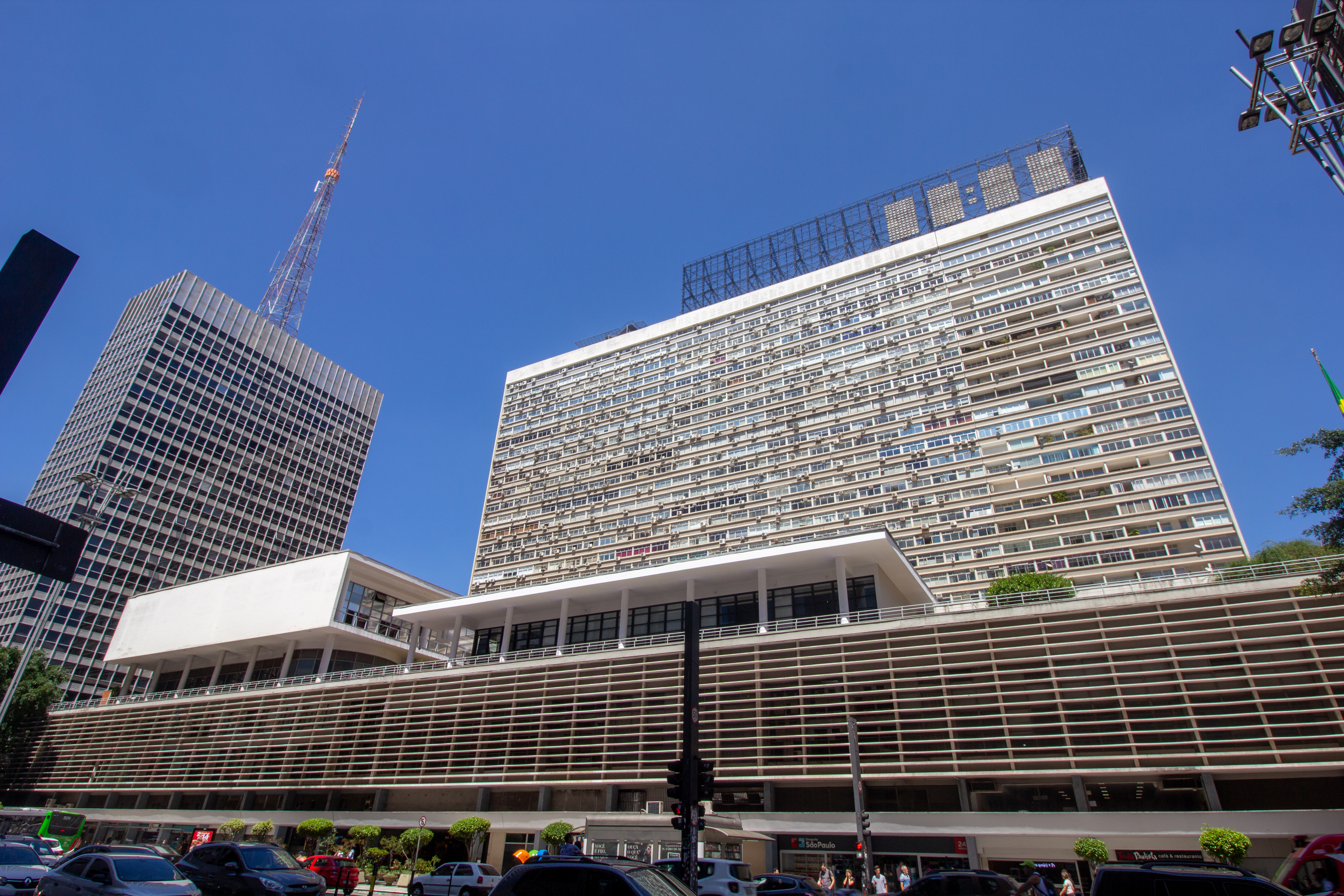
Conjunto Nacional.

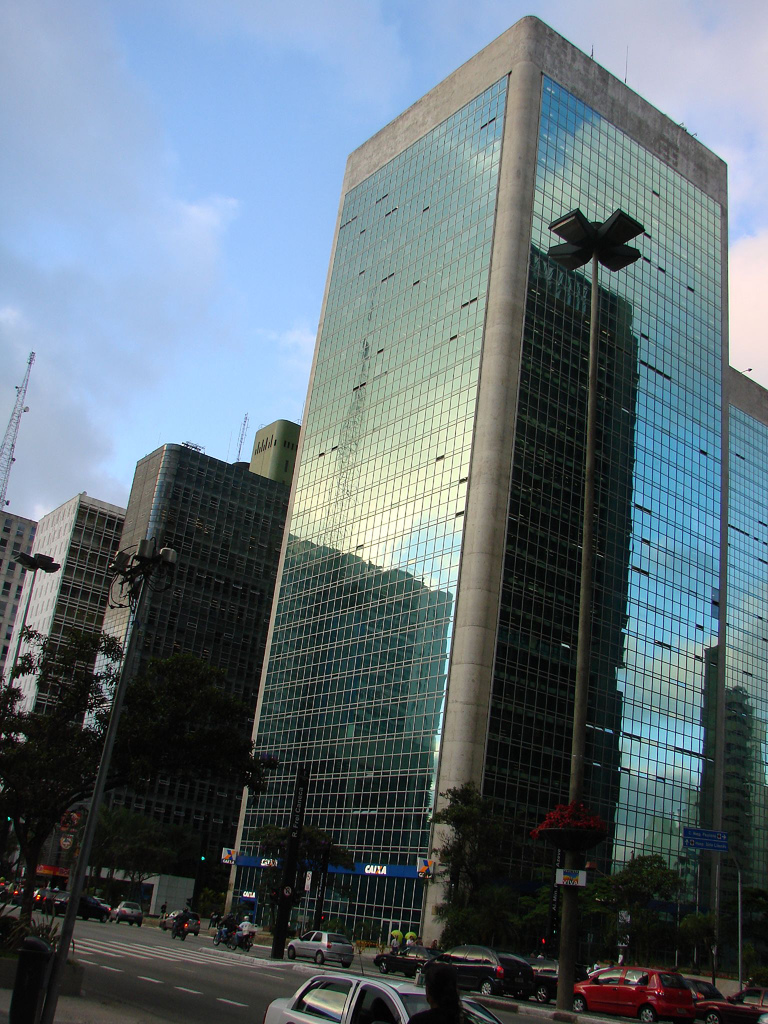
Cetenco Plaza

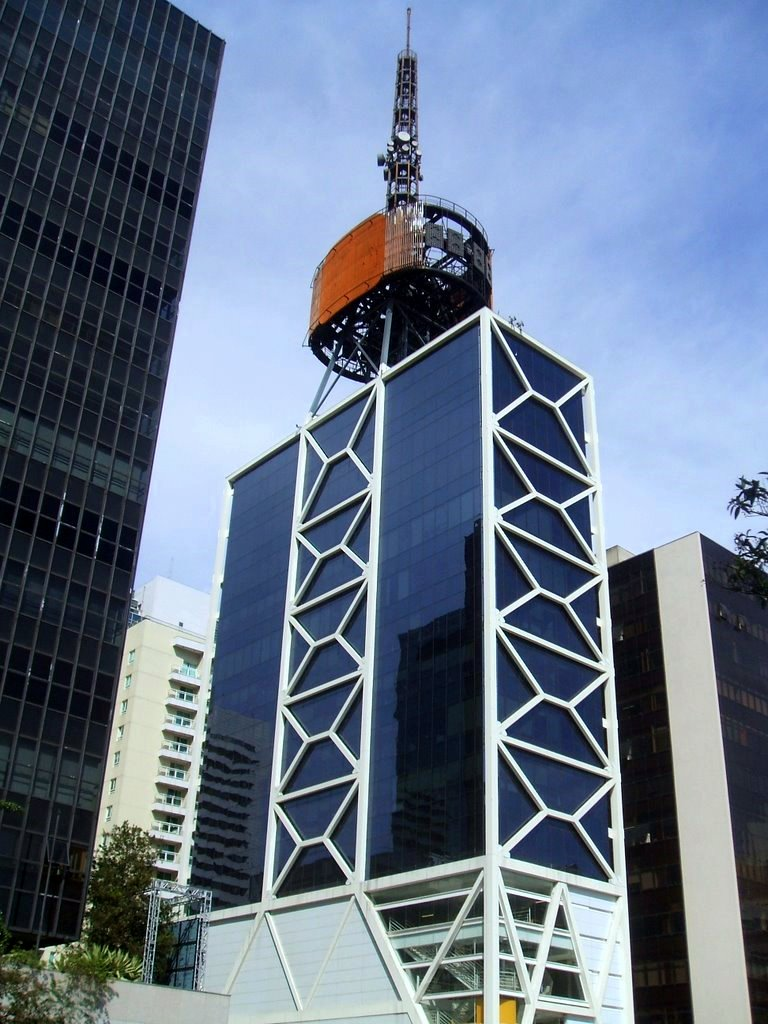
Itaú Cultural

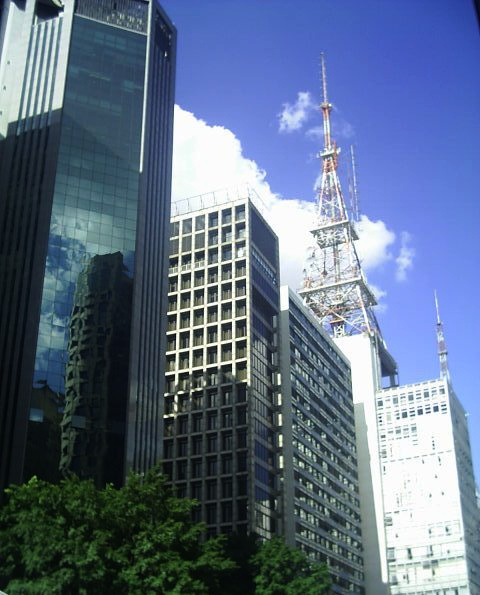
The Business Buildings in Paulista Avenue
Streetscapes

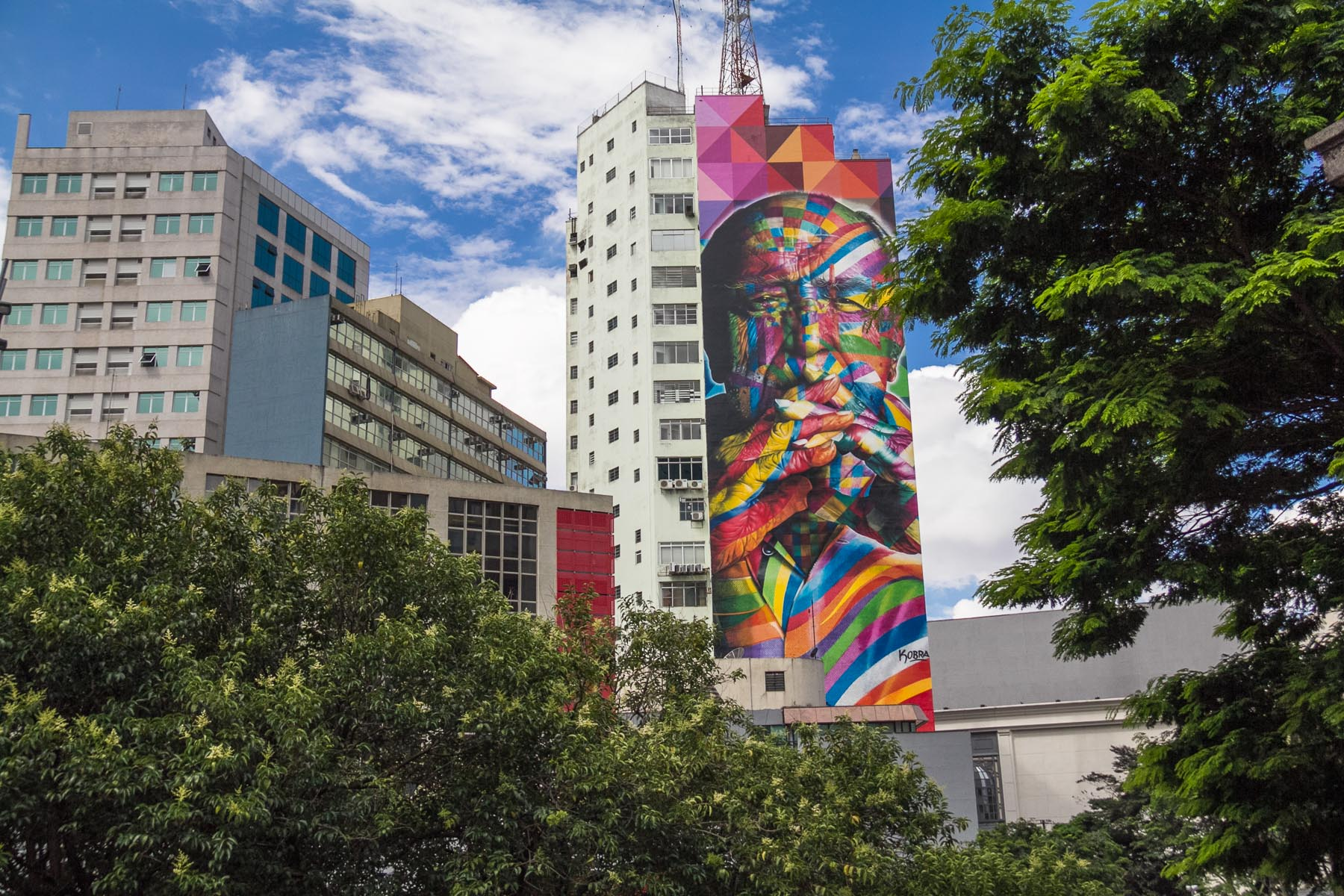
Paulista Avenue, São Paulo.

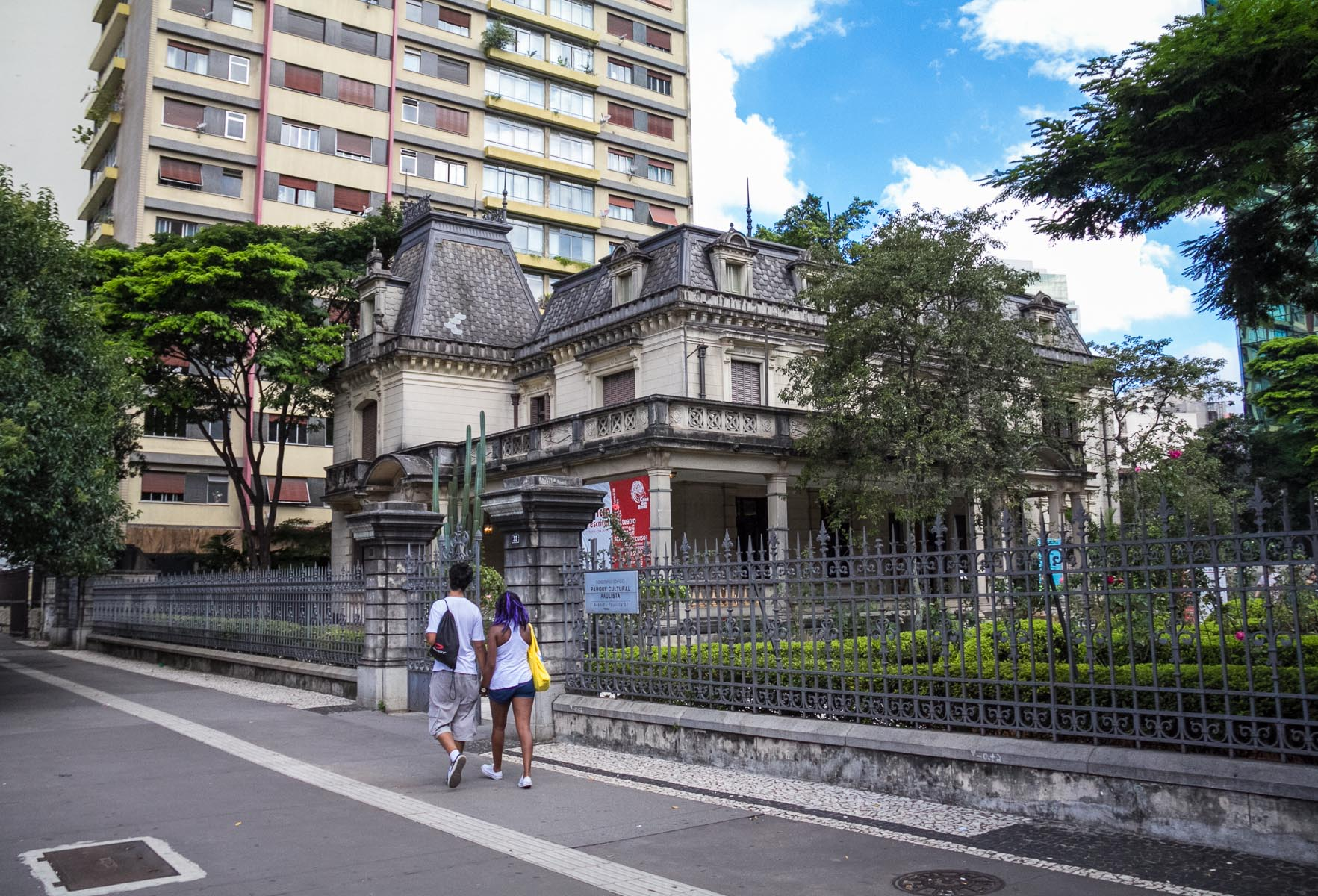
Paulista Avenue, São Paulo.

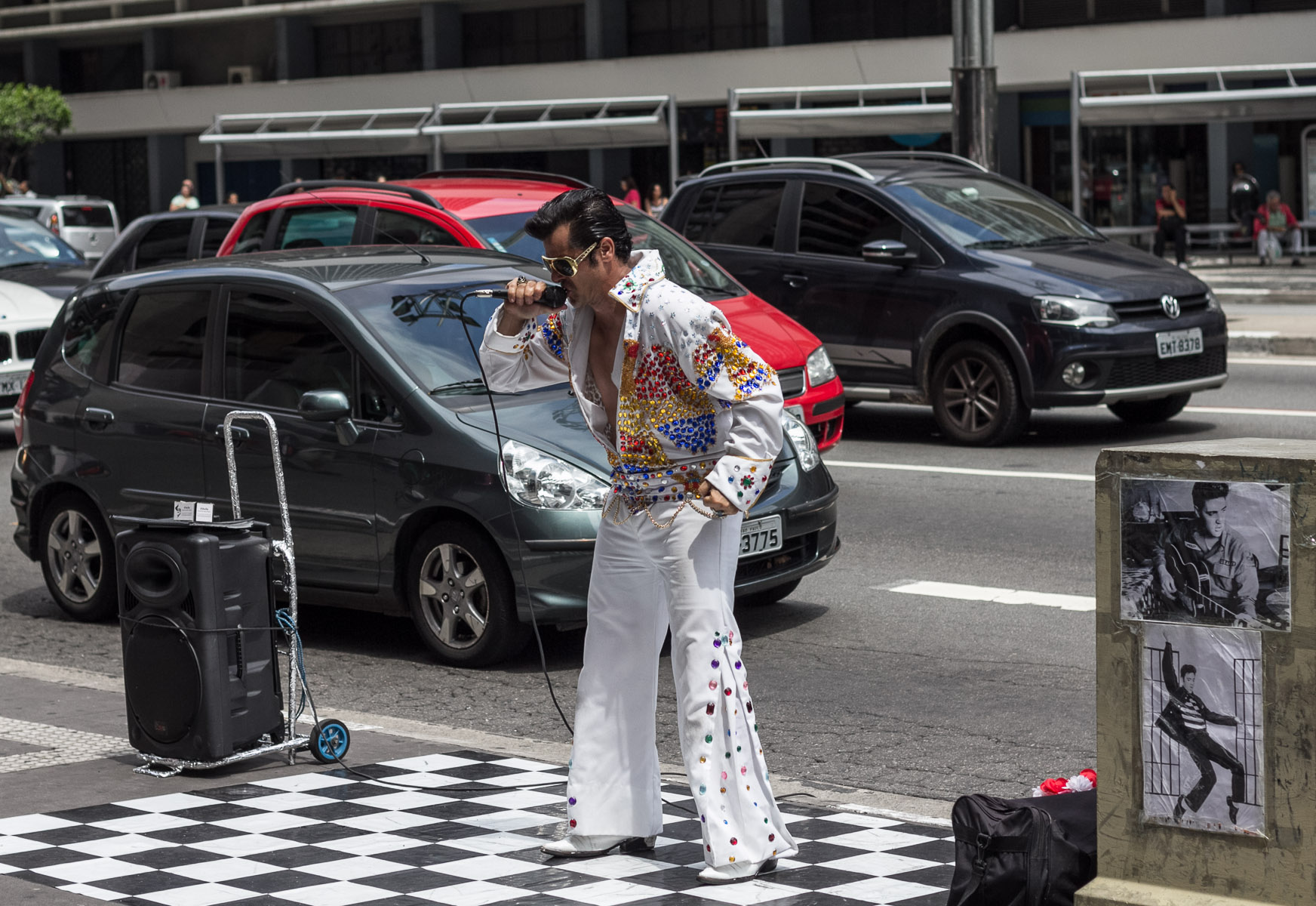
Paulista Avenue, São Paulo.

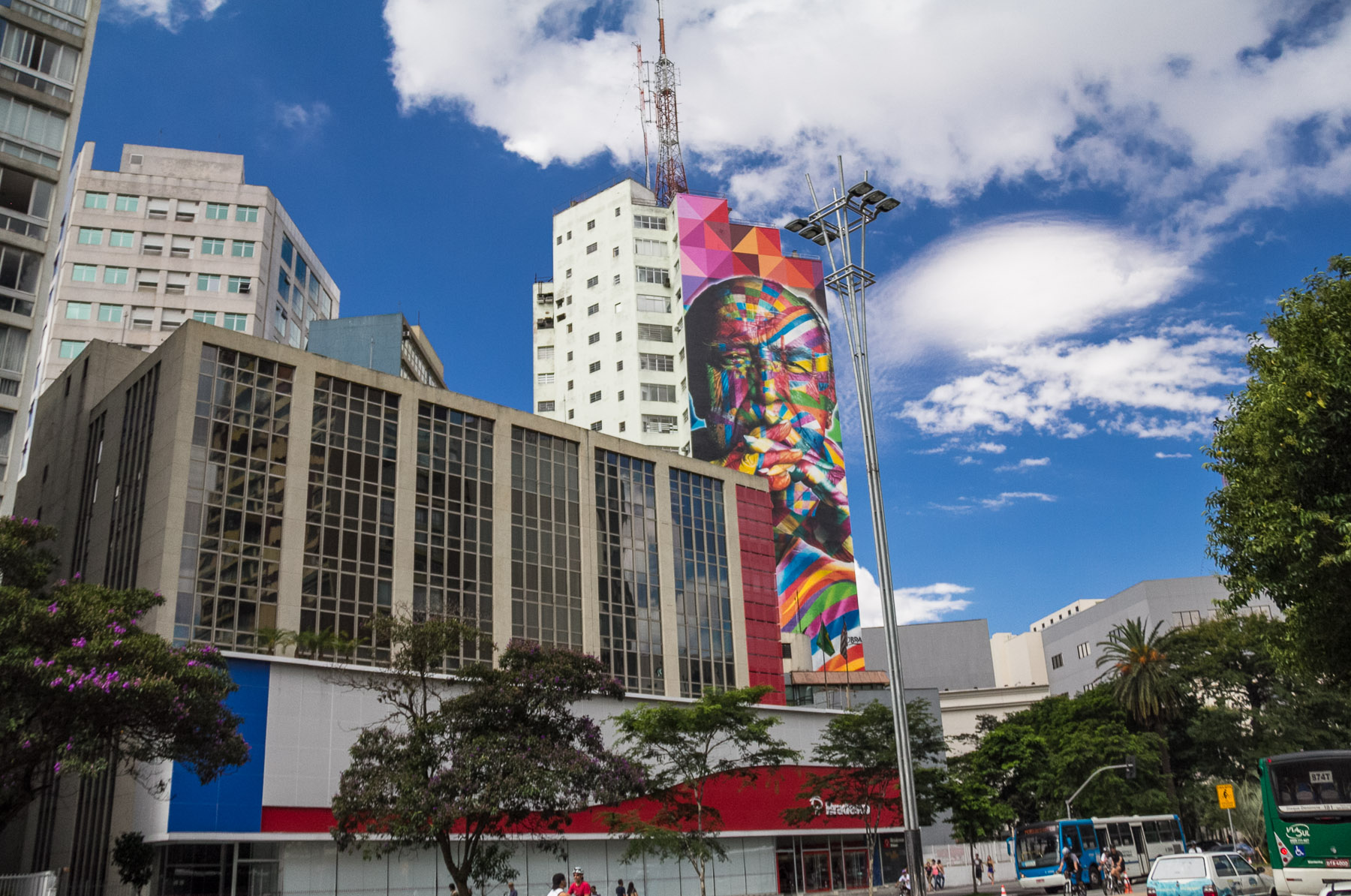
Paulista Avenue, São Paulo.

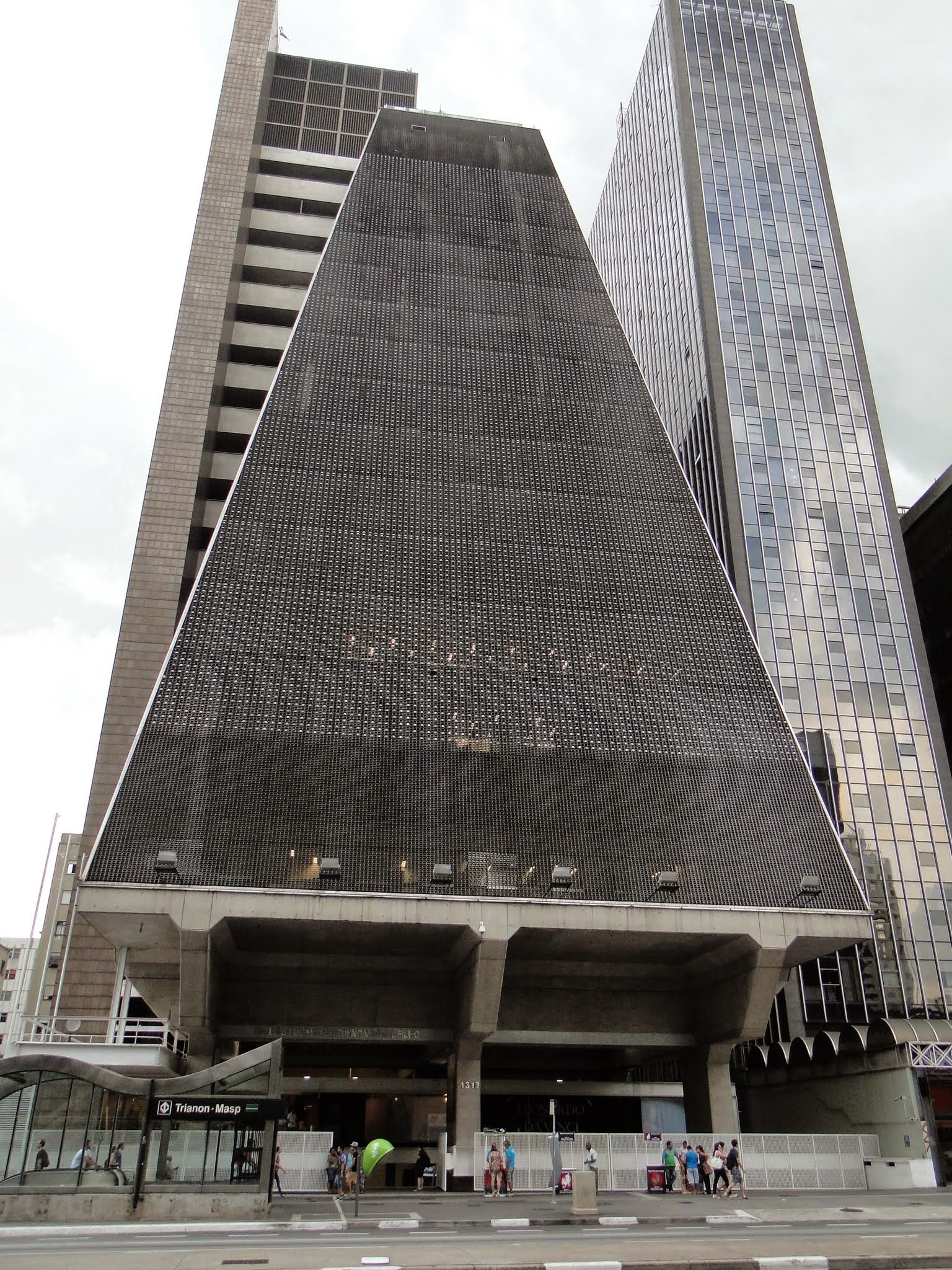
Paulista avenue

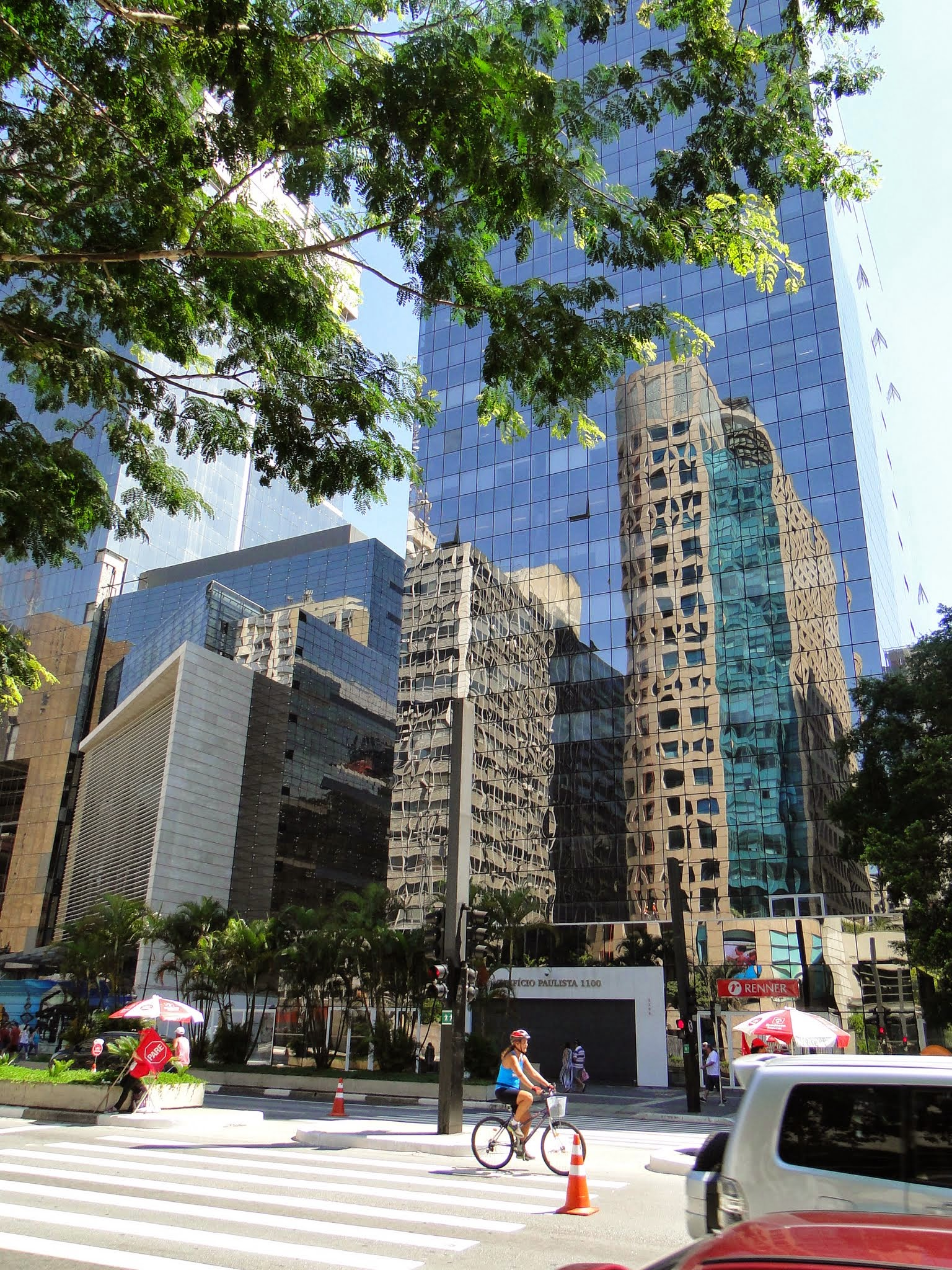
Paulista avenue

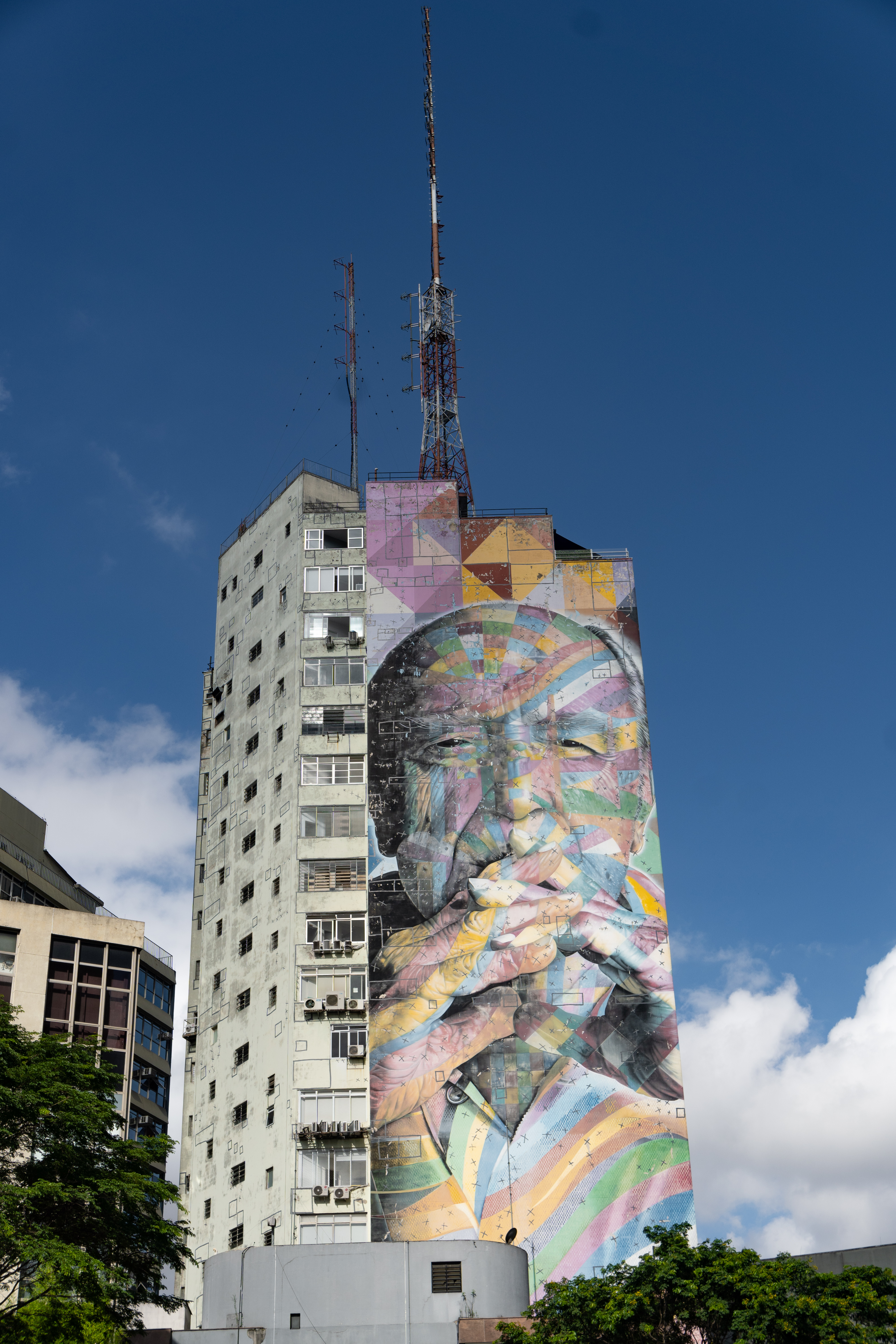
Paulista avenue

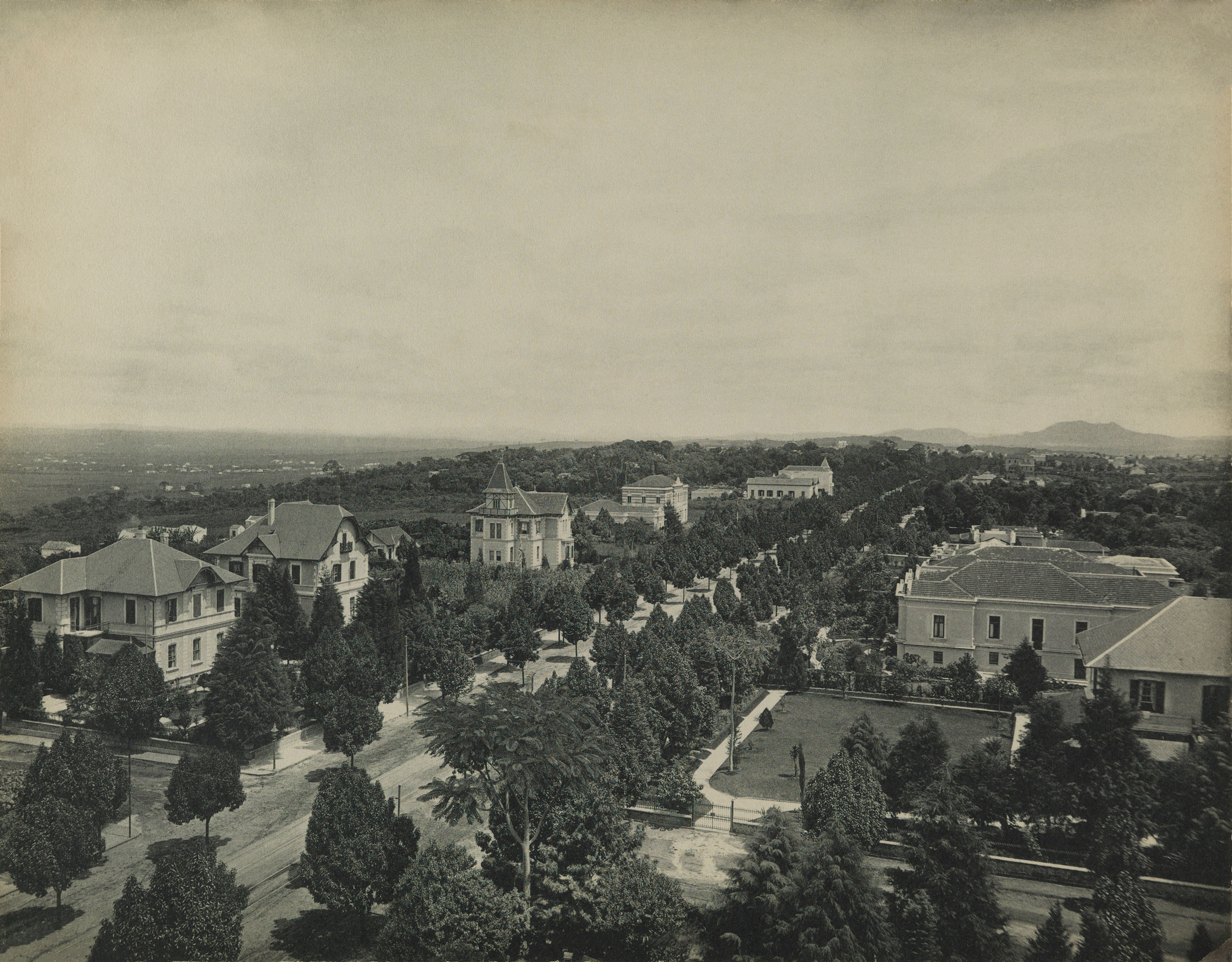
Paulista Avenue

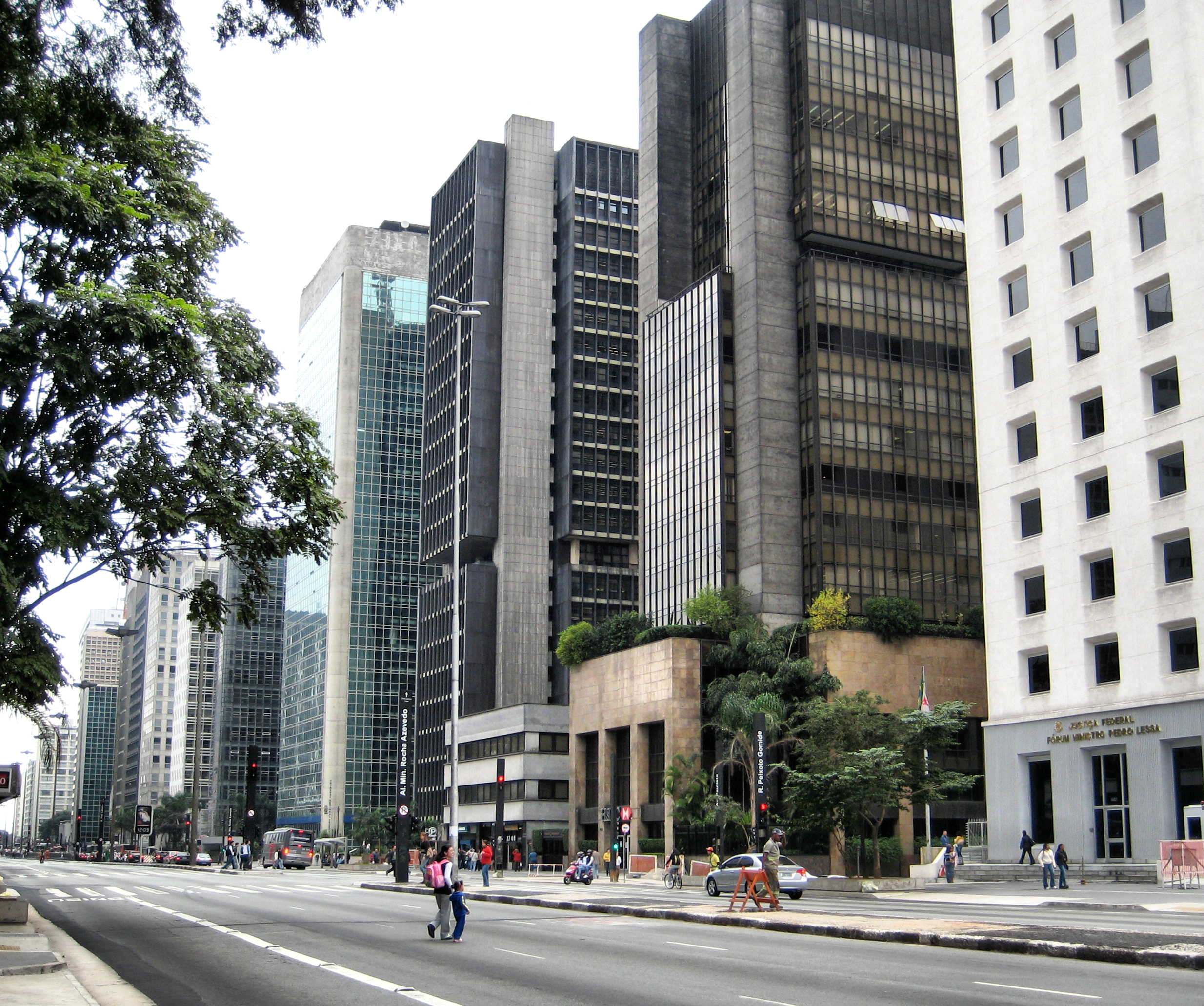
Paulista Avenue

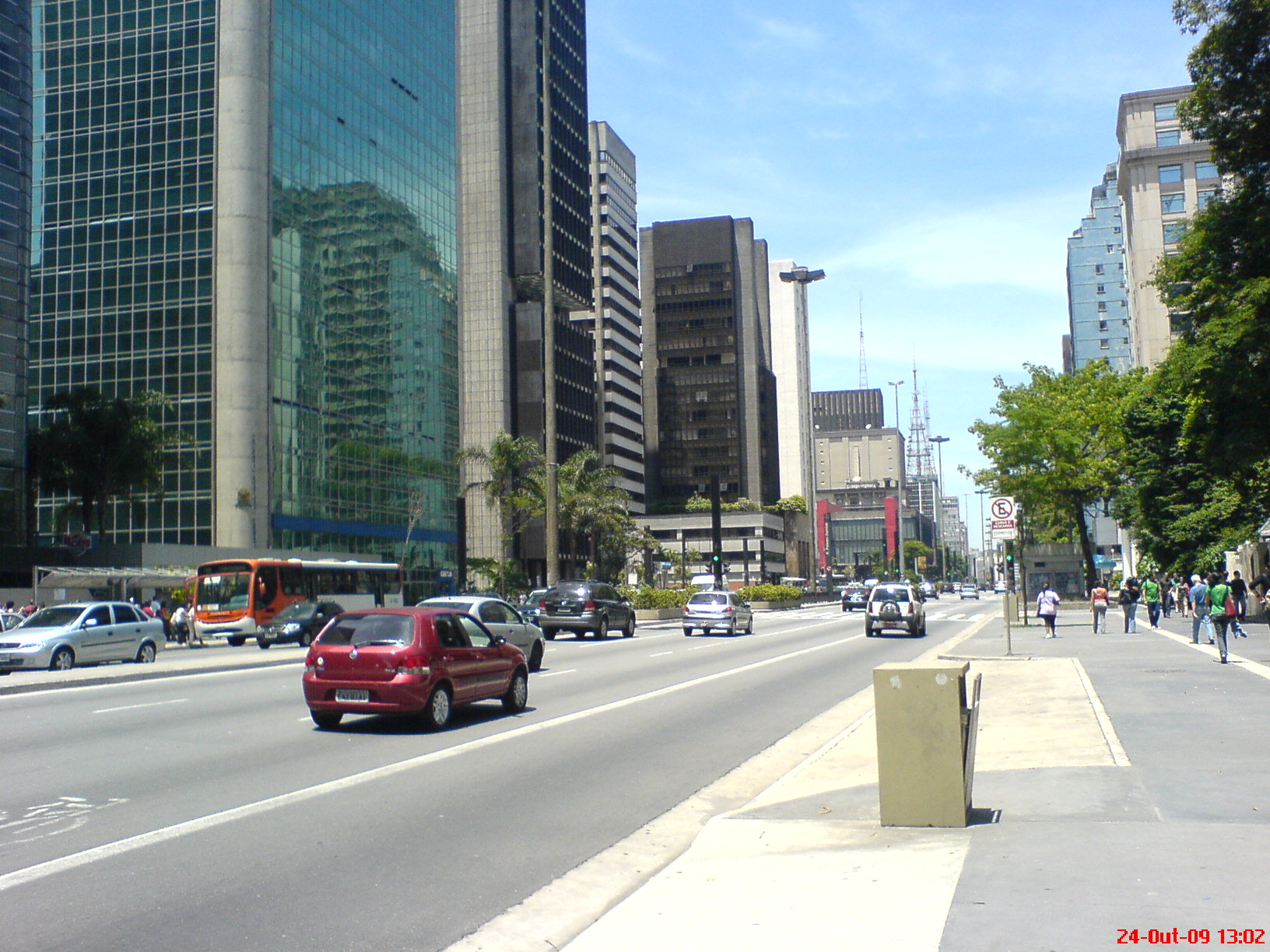
Paulista Avenue

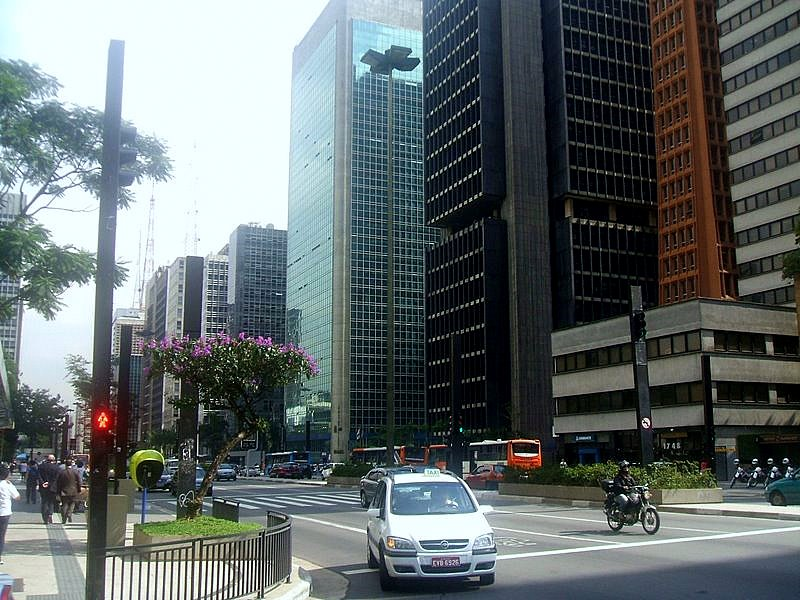
Paulista Avenue

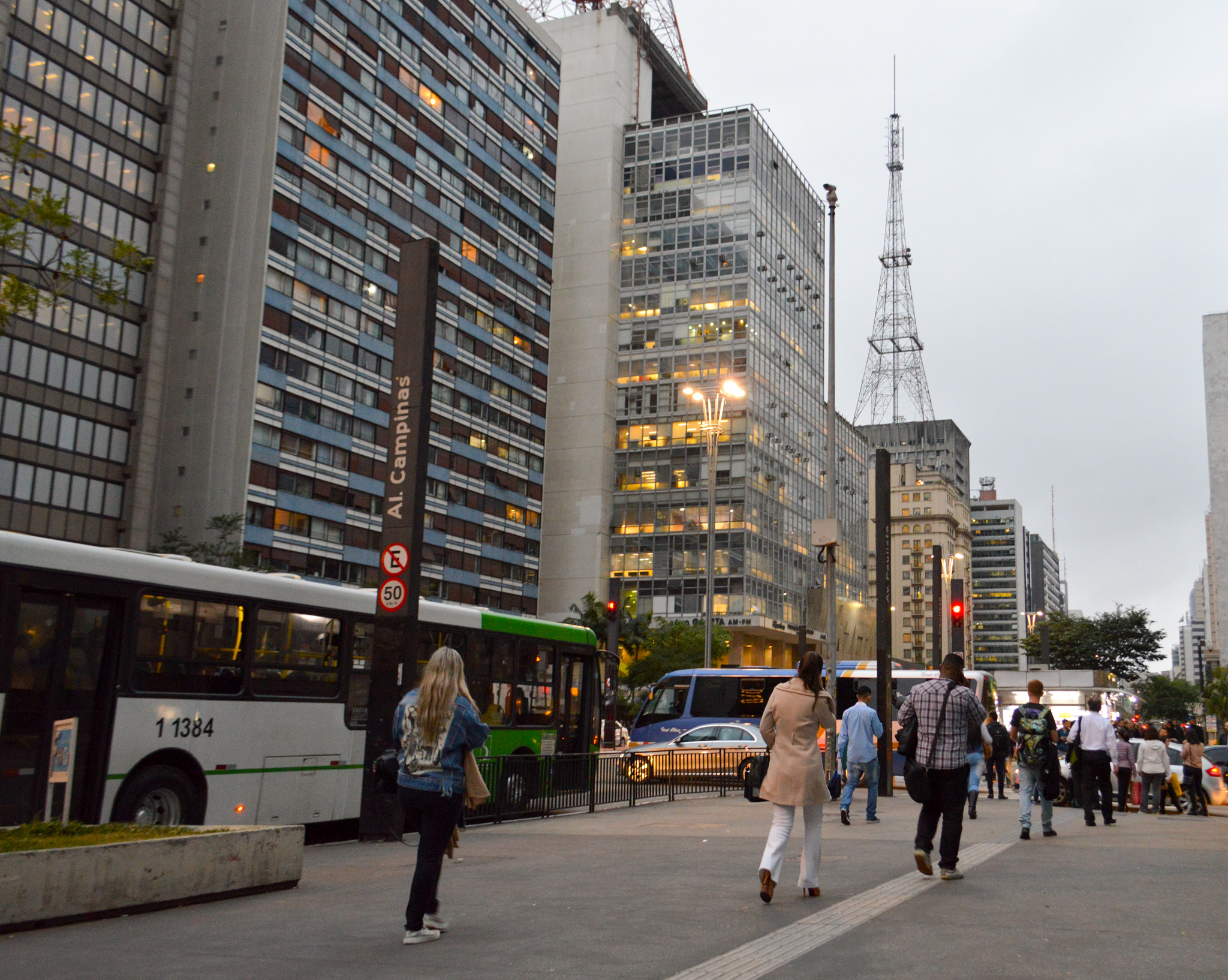
Paulista Avenue

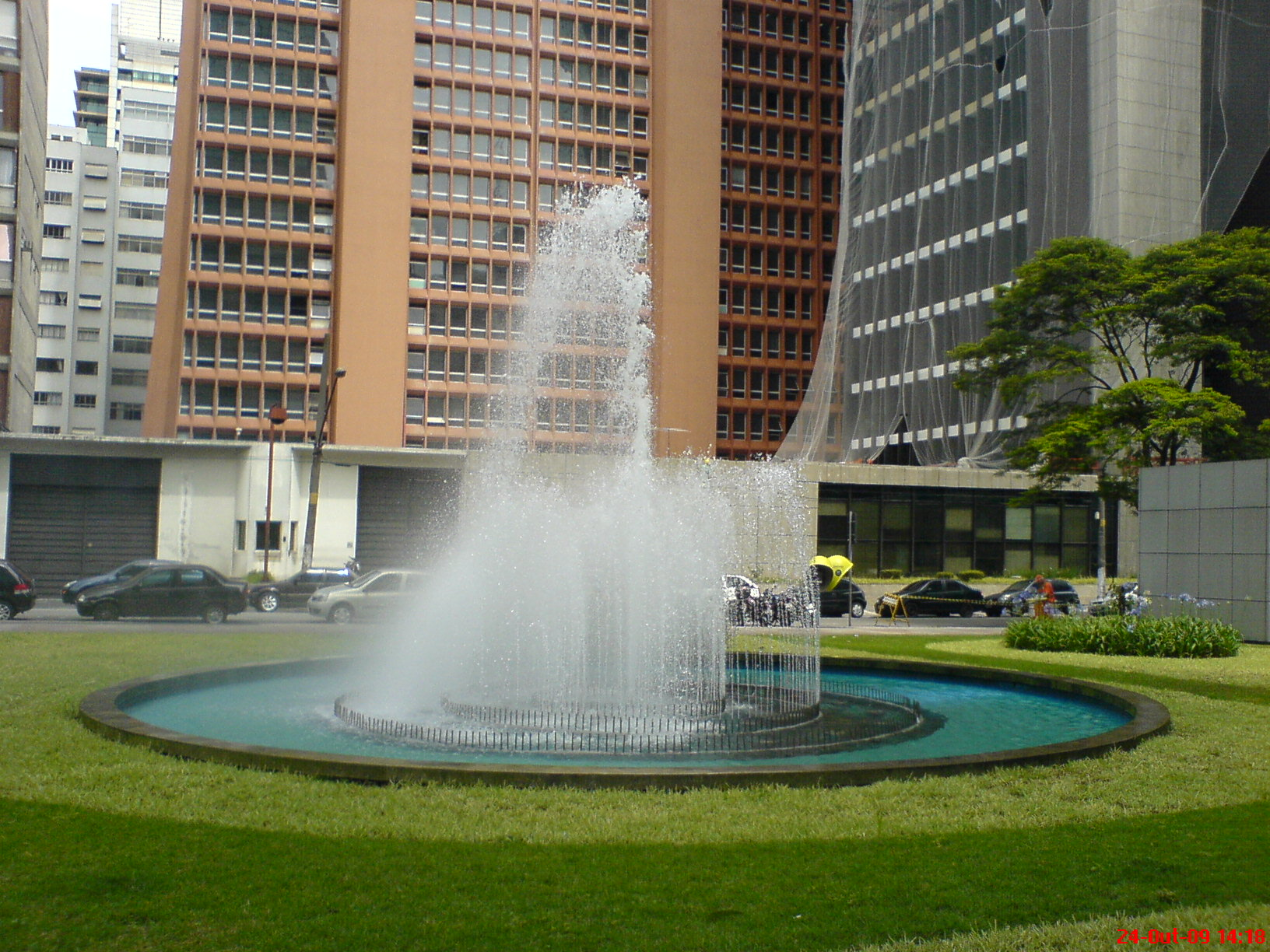
Paulista Avenue

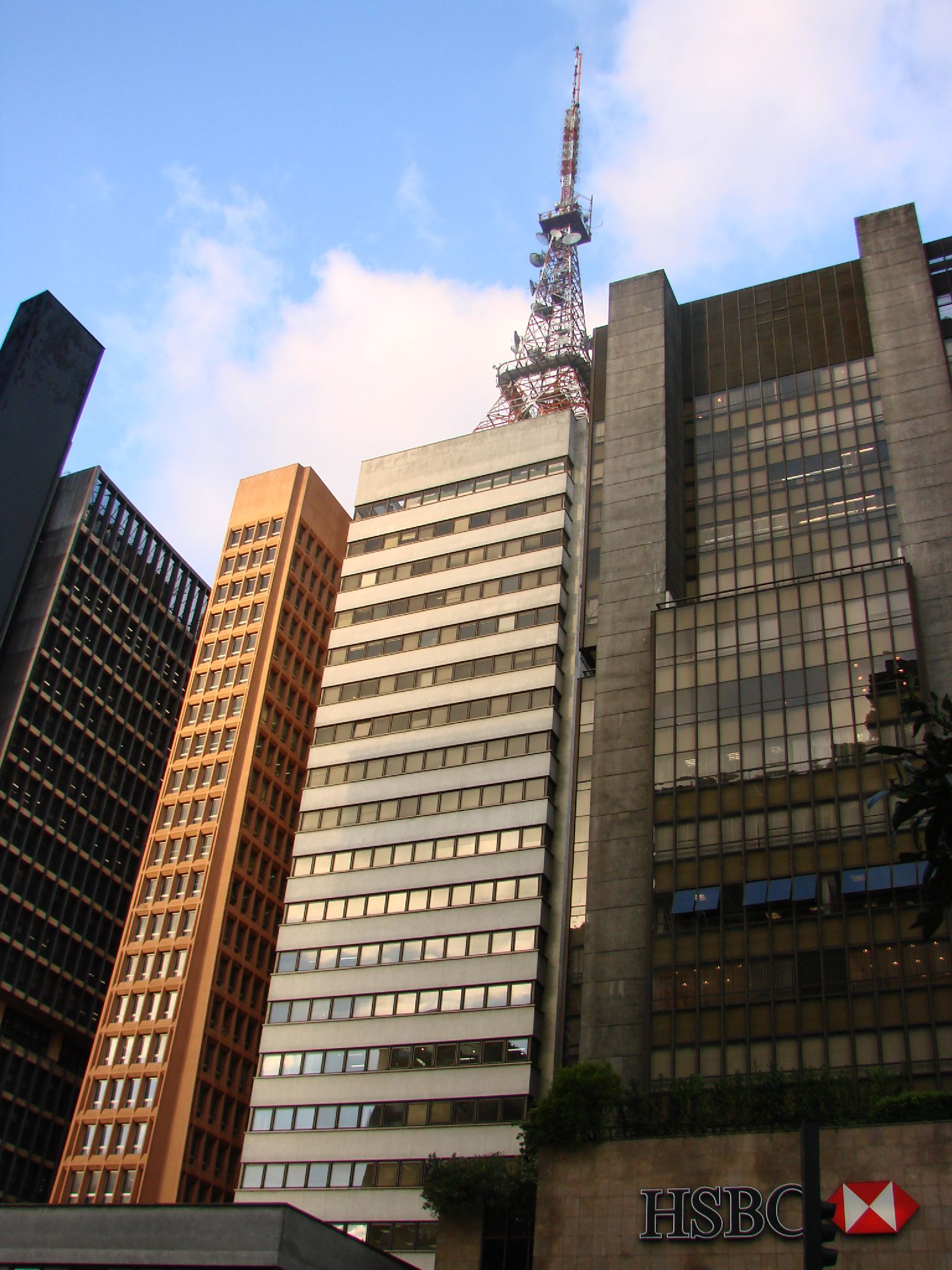
Paulista Avenue

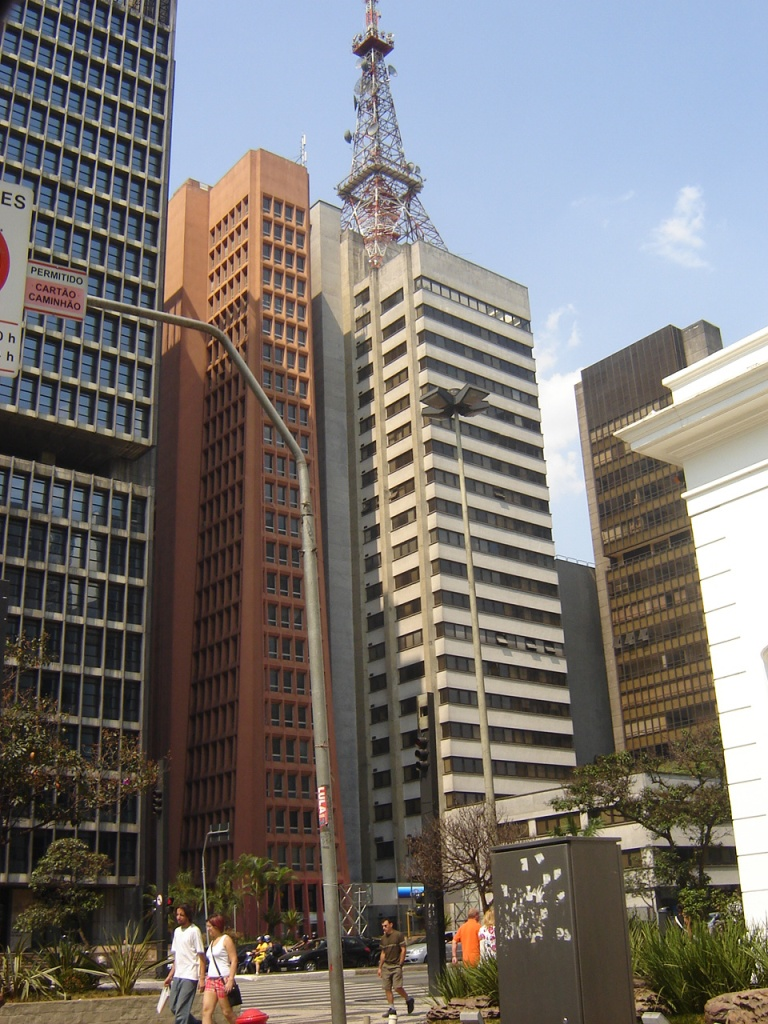
Paulista Avenue

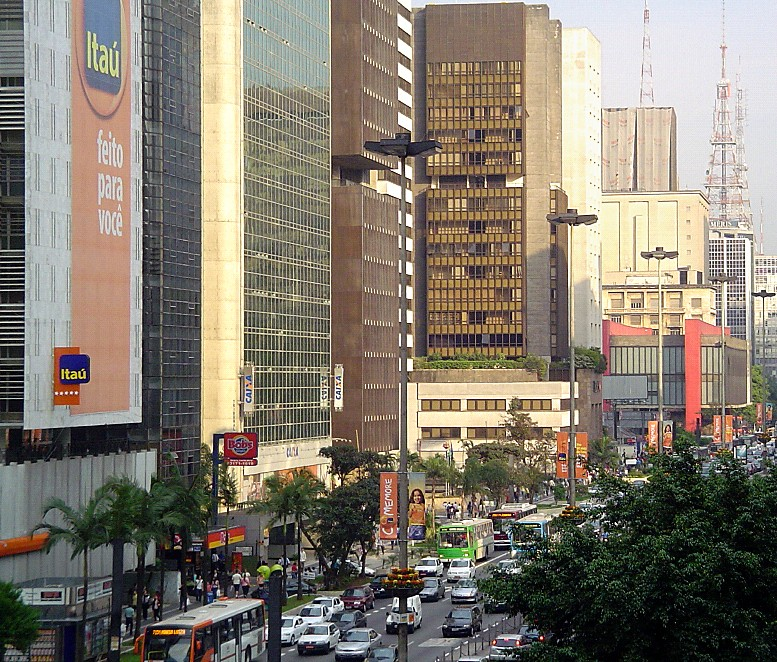
Paulista Avenue

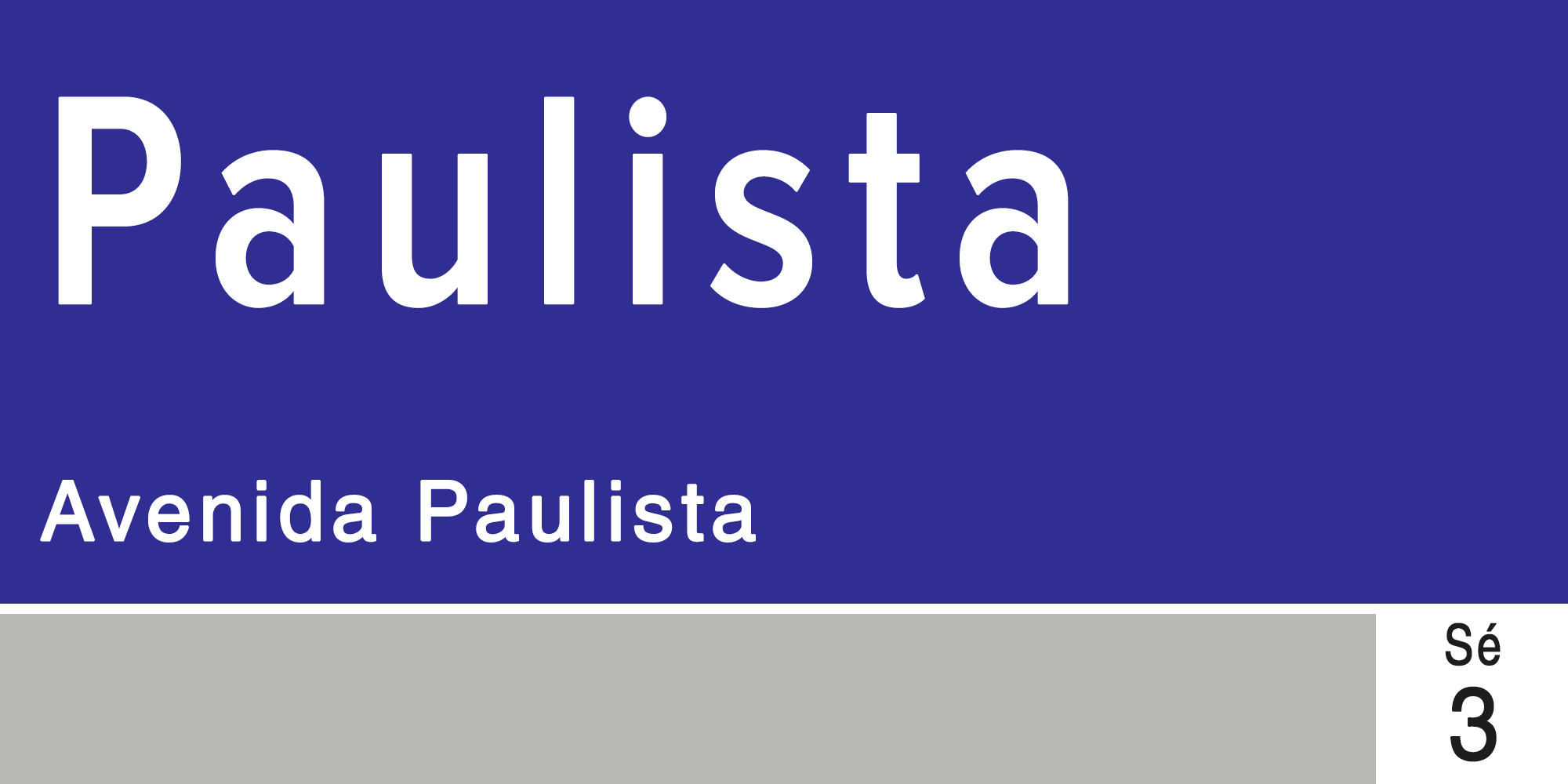

== See also ==
- Avenida Paulista no dia da Inauguração, 8 de Dezembro de 1891, a depiction of the Paulista Avenue
- Champs-Élysées
- Fifth Avenue
- Avenida Rio Branco
- Mexico City's Paseo de la Reforma
- Königsallee
- Broadway
- Edifício Grande Avenida
- Fundação Cásper Líbero
- São Paulo Museum of Art
- Central Zone of São Paulo
- Rua Oscar Freire
- Avenida da Liberdade
- Tourism in the city of São Paulo

== Bibliography ==
- Limena, Maria Margarida Cavalcanti (1996). Avenida Paulista : imagens da metrópole (in Portuguese). São Paulo: Educ FAPESP. ISBN 9788528301045.
