= Avenida Paulista no dia da Inauguração, 8 de Dezembro de 1891 =

Painting by Jules Martin

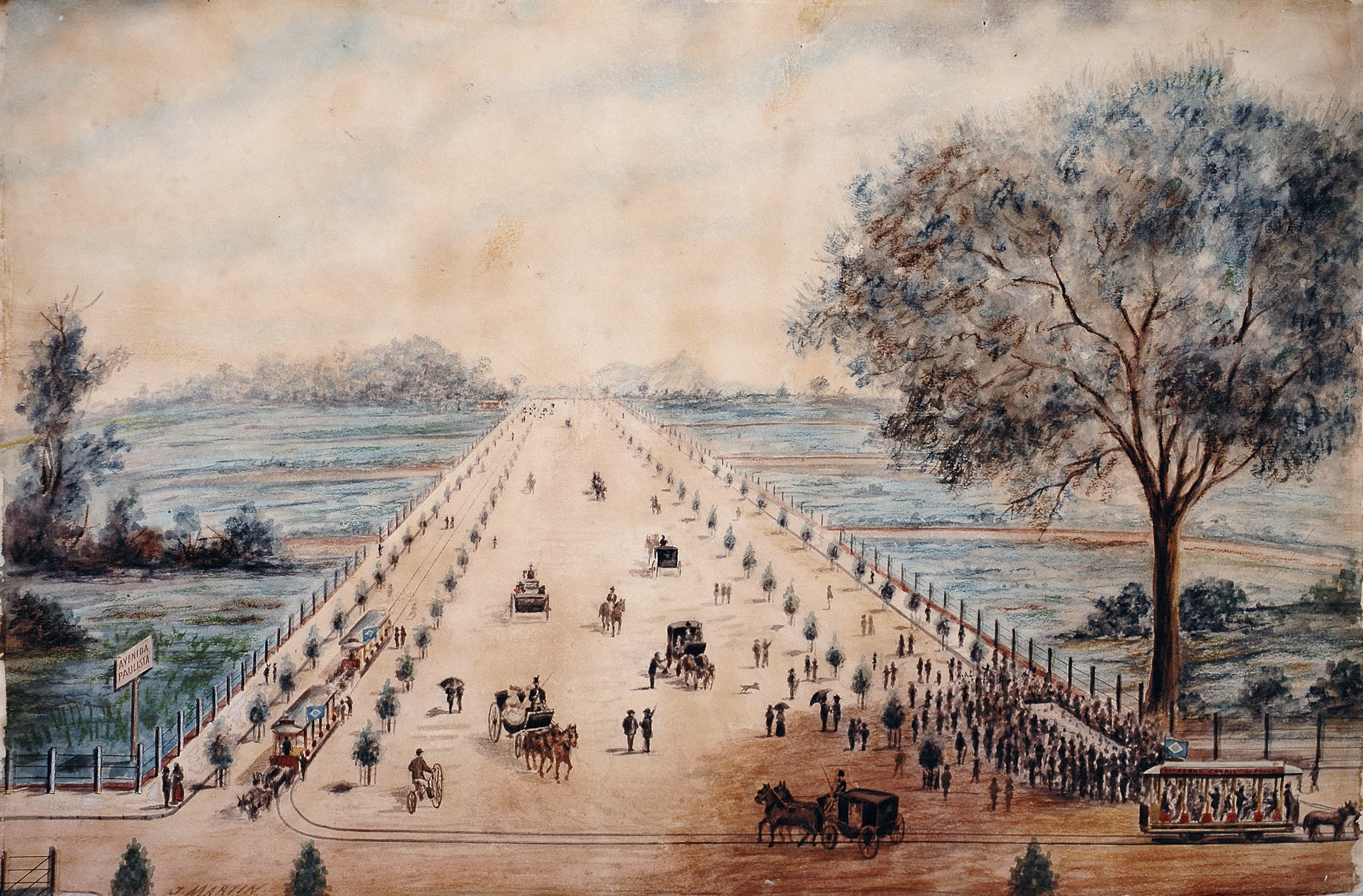
- Artist: Jules Martin
- Year: 1891
- Type: Historical painting
- Medium: Watercolor
- Dimensions: 45.5 cm (17.9 in) × 66.9 cm (26.3 in)
- Location: Museu do Ipiranga, São Paulo

Avenida Paulista no dia da Inauguração, 8 de Dezembro de 1891 (English: "Avenida Paulista on Inauguration Day, December 8, 1891") is a watercolor painting by Jules Martin. It is considered the first depiction of the Paulista Avenue, in São Paulo, Brazil. The painting was completed on the same day the avenue was officially inaugurated and named, December 8, 1891.

This work belongs to the historical painting genre and is located in the Museu Paulista. It is part of the Fundo Museu Paulista Collection and registered under the inventory number 1-08672-0000-0000. The painting measures 45.5 centimeters in height and 66.9 centimeters in width.

The canvas portrays not only Paulista Avenue but also other significant nearby streets, vacant lots, plants, trees, and people moving around, mainly on horseback or in carriages. The figures depicted represent the upper classes of São Paulo society at the time.

== Description ==
At the center of the painting, Jules Martin portrays a wide, elongated dirt road that stretches to the horizon line. On both sides of the avenue, vacant lots stand out for their flat, leveled terrain, which descends slightly after a few meters. Each lot is enclosed by fences and separated by smaller streets.

On the first lot on the left, a sign reading "Avenida Paulista" is visible. In the adjacent lot, a tree casts shadows over a group of people gathered around a table on the sidewalk, where snacks and sweets are placed.

Well-dressed men and women from the city's wealthier classes, as envisioned by the avenue's engineer, Joaquim Eugênio de Lima, can be seen strolling in the area.

Many figures in the painting travel by horse-drawn trams, carriages, or even bicycles. In the lower right corner, one of the trams crosses Brigadeiro Luís Antônio Avenue. In the background on the left, a cluster of trees is visible. Later, it would become the Trianon Park.

== Context ==
Paulista Avenue was designed by engineer Joaquim Eugênio de Lima. Before its development, the area, known as “Real Grandeza,” served as a passageway. Amid São Paulo's growth driven by the coffee-centered economy, the city's industrial elites sought a spacious, distant location to settle, away from the general population. Paulista Avenue was chosen for its elevated, flat terrain and distance from the city center.

As a highly anticipated project, it was overseen by the governor of São Paulo, Senator Rangel Pestana, the mayor, Clementino de Sousa e Castro, and O Estado de S. Paulo editor, Júlio de Mesquita. The inauguration drew numerous officials and media, with Martin's painting portraying the event.

The artist gifted the painting to Joaquim Eugênio de Lima. Years later, Lima's widow, Margarida Joaquina Álvares de Toledo Lima, donated it to the Museu Paulista.

== Analysis ==
At the time of the painting, Paulista Avenue was still a dirt road. It was paved with macadam in 1900. The horse-drawn trams depicted, guided by ground tracks, are notable; electric trams were introduced nine years later.

On the left side of the background, natural vegetation forms a cluster of trees in a lot then known by the name of a French landscape architect, Paul Villon. This place would later become the Trianon Park.

The painting reveals an absence of residences or infrastructure like water or sewage systems, reflecting the avenue's leisurely character at the time. These structures only began to be built in the area in 1894. Until then, the street was considered a summer destination, with residences that served as temporary accommodation.
