= Marechal Cordeiro de Farias Square =

- Public square
- {{{other_names}}}
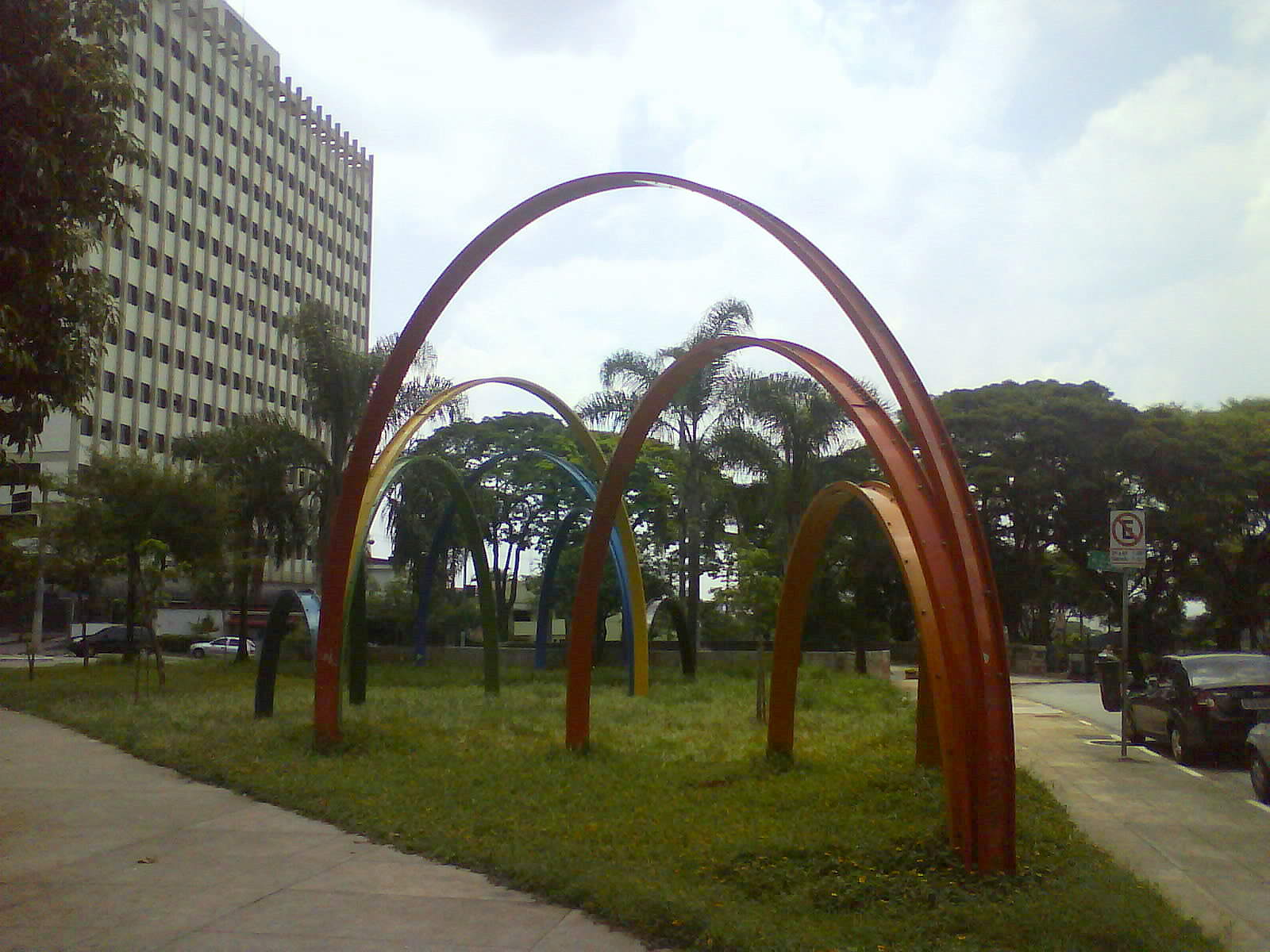
- Praça dos Arcos, Marechal Cordeiro de Farias Square
- Location: Consolação, São Paulo, Brazil
- Interactive map of Marechal Cordeiro de Farias Square
- Coordinates: 23°33′17.3″S 46°39′50.34″W

Marechal Cordeiro de Farias Square (Portuguese: Praça Marechal Cordeiro de Farias) is a square located in the Higienópolis neighborhood of the district of Consolação, São Paulo, Brazil. It begins at the terminus of Paulista Avenue, and has corners on Minas Gerais, Itápolis avenues and Angelica street. The square is named after the Marshal Osvaldo Cordeiro de Farias (1901-1981), a Brazilian revolutionary, politician, and former governor of the State of Rio Grande do Sul.

Marechal Cordeiro de Farias Square is also known as the "Square of Arches" (Praça dos Arcos) due to the sculpture of Lilian Amaral and Jorge Bassani titled Arcos ou Caminho. It consists of twelve rainbow-colored arches from which the public can enter and exit. The work was commissioned to celebrate the centenary of Paulista Avenue in December 1991. The square has a bicycle parking facility and is noted as a terminus of the emerging bicycle routes of São Paulo.
