= Edifício Grande Avenida =

Building in São Paulo, Brasil

Coordinates: 23.5602°S 46.6571°W

Edifício Grande Avenida or Grande Avenida Building is a building located at 1754 Avenida Paulista in São Paulo, Brazil. The building was founded in 1964. Characterized by one of the remarkable architectural styles in town, the building sustained two fires during its history. The first was minor and took place in 1969. The second fire in 1981 killed 17 people and led to an investigation which found the building layout to be responsible for the fire.

== 1981 Fire ==
The fire began in the mezzanine of the building on the afternoon of February 14, 1981. It occurred on a Carnival Saturday and the building was emptier than usual. 17 people died, most of them employed with Construtora Figueiredo Ferraz, a local civil engineering contractor, working overtime to keep up with a delayed project to be presented on the upcoming Thursday. At the time of the fire, the building was used as the headquarters for Brazilian Television channel Record TV

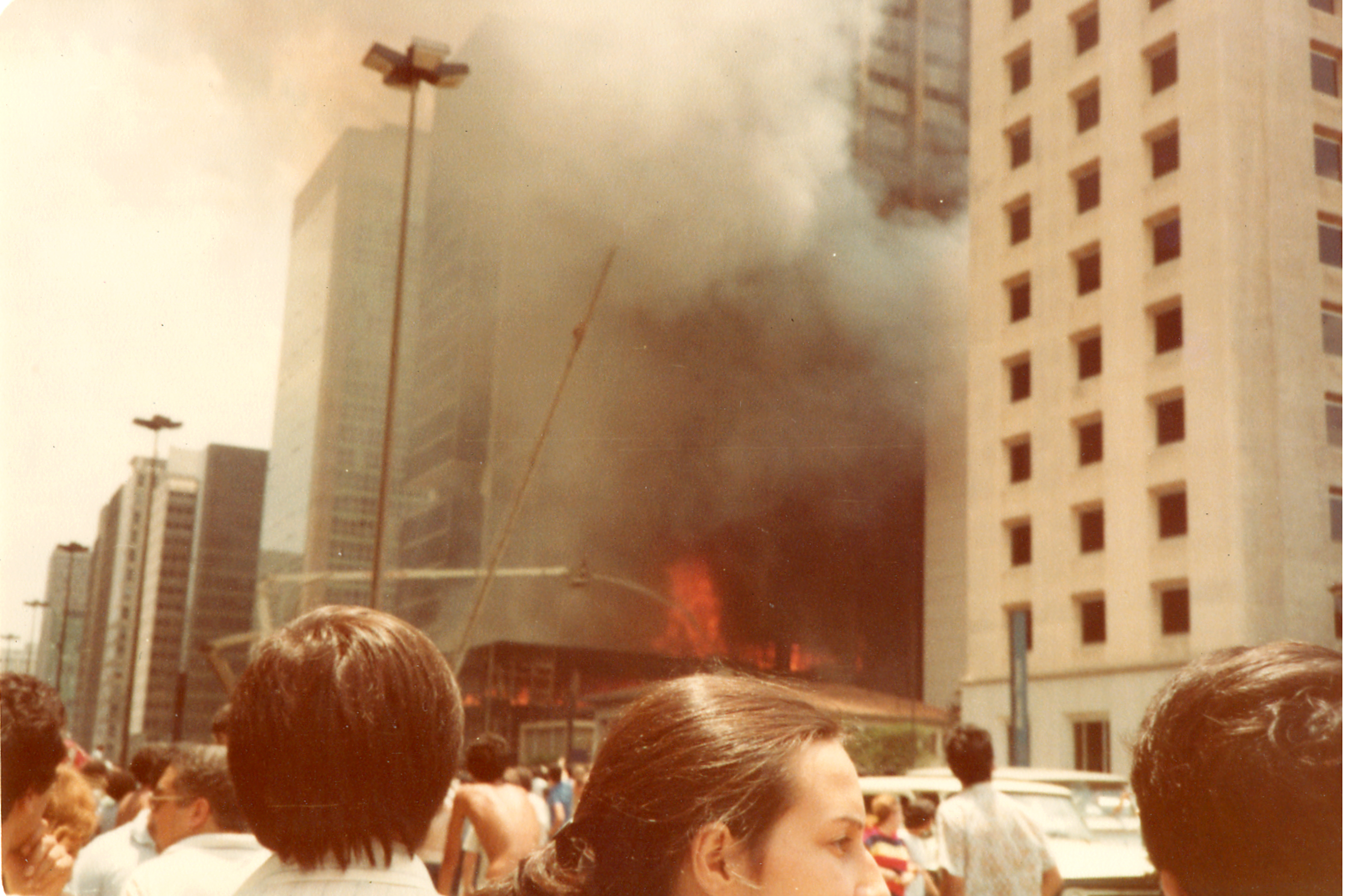

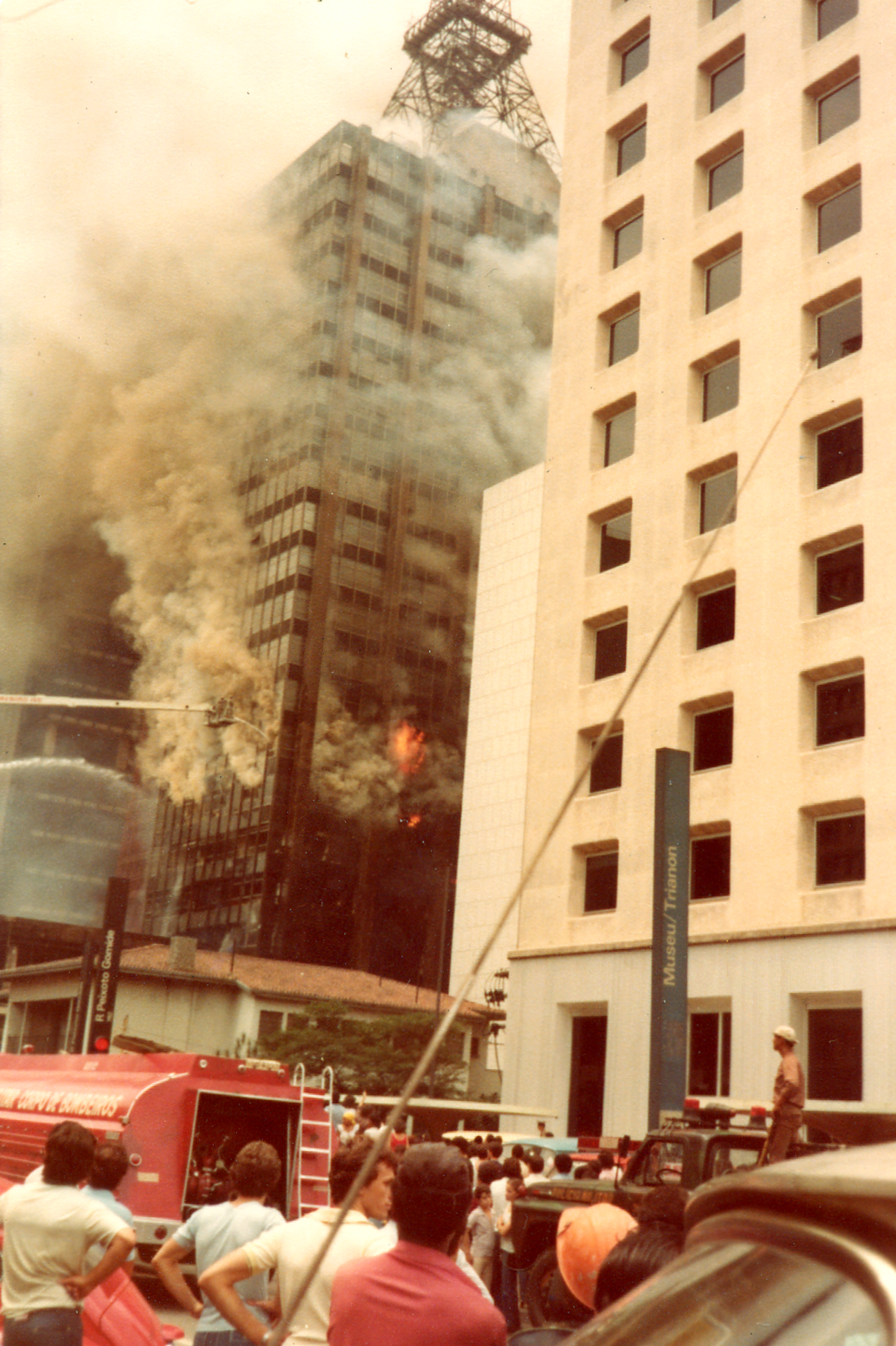

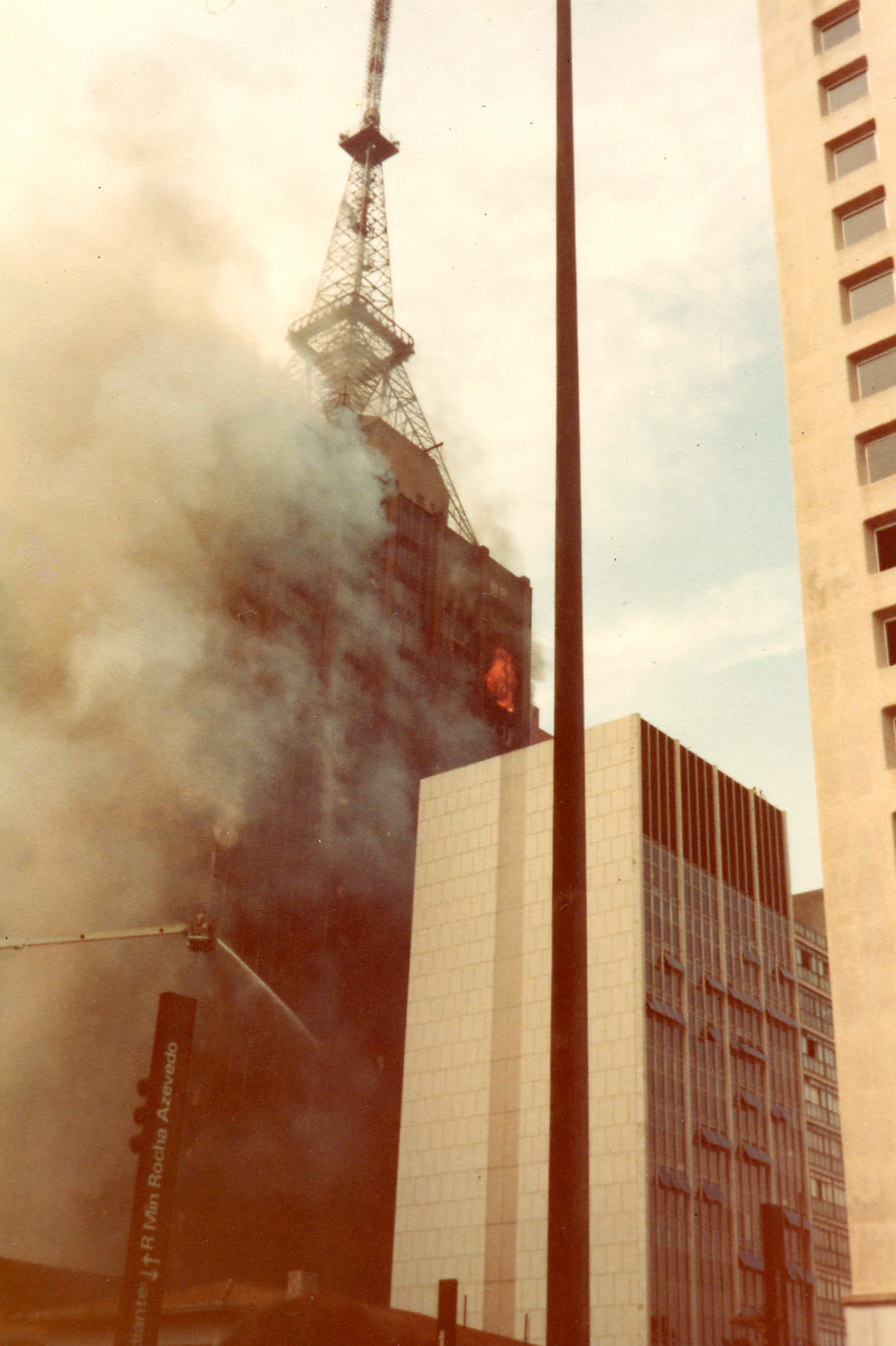

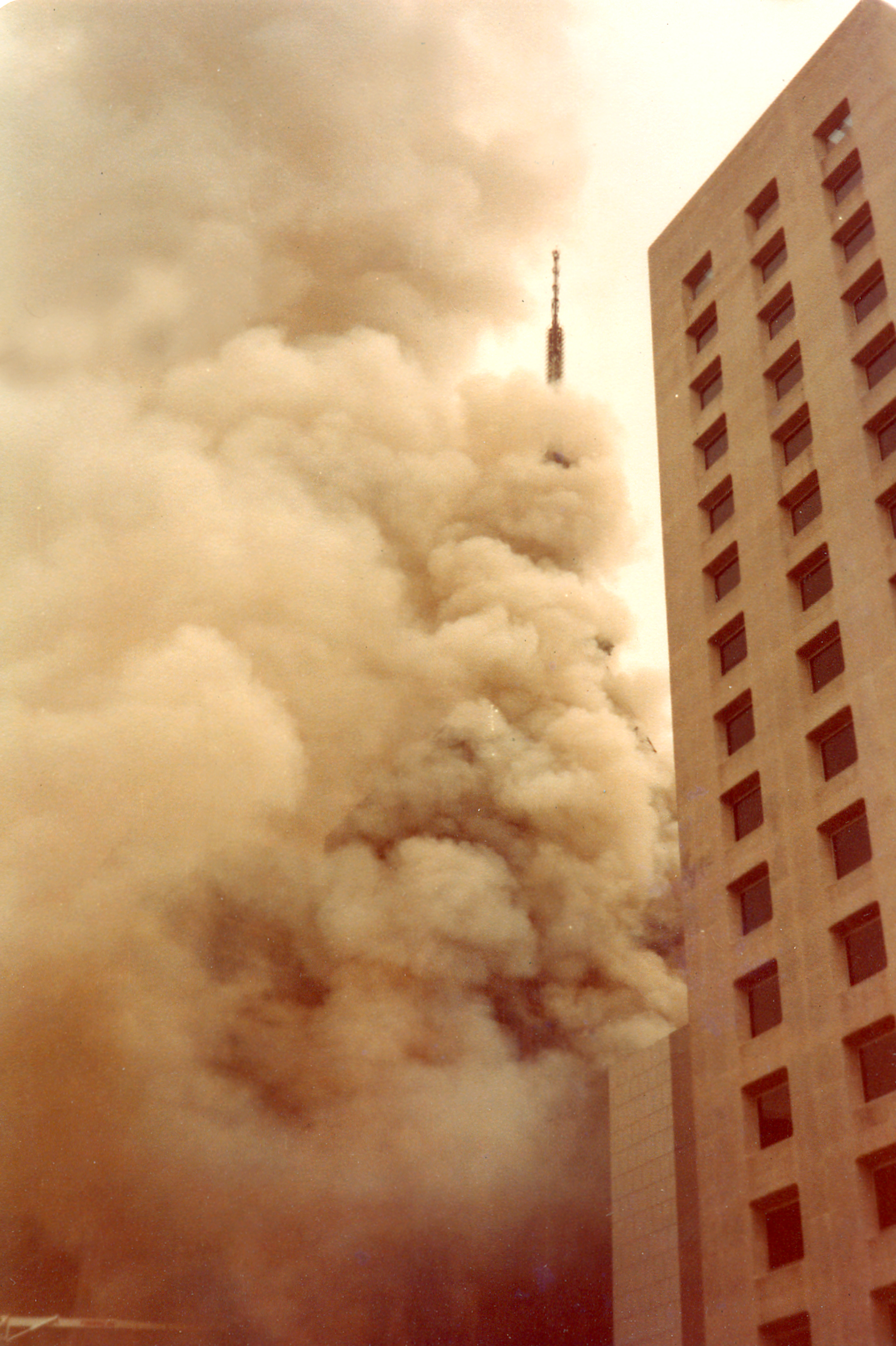
