= Transport in São Paulo =

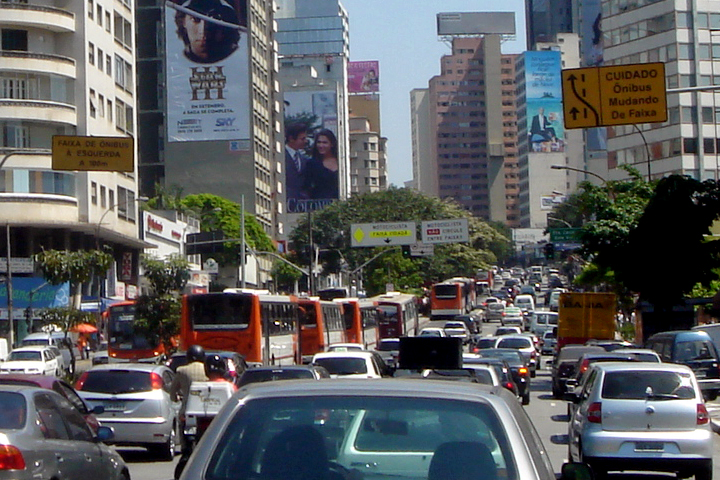
Traffic on Consolação Avenue in São Paulo.

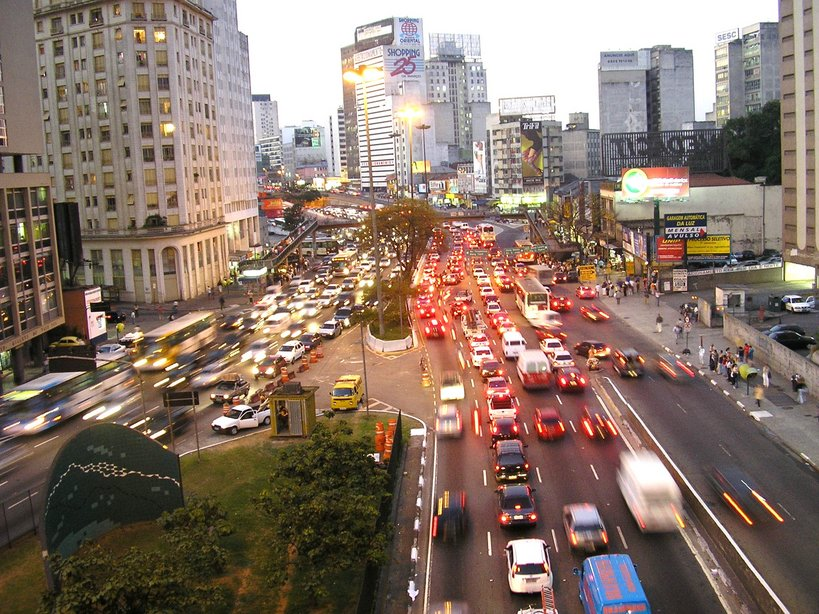
Congestion on Prestes Maia Avenue in São Paulo.

Transport in São Paulo plays a key role in the daily lives of the people of São Paulo and offers various methods of public transport that are offered in the city, including a complex bus system run by SPTrans, and various subway and railway lines. A contactless smartcard is used to pay fares for the buses, subway, and railway systems. São Paulo also has three airports.

== Bus system ==
Over 16,000 buses form the bulk of the public transport in São Paulo; including about 290 trolley buses. With the exception of a small network overseen by the EMTU, all bus lines are operated by concessionaires under the supervision of SPTrans, a municipal company responsible for the planning and management of public transport. The SPTrans buses are painted with region-specific colours and carry about 8,8 million people daily. Until 2003, informal transport vans had a large presence in the city, but the vast majority are now registered with the city council, legalised, and now operate under the same colour scheme used in the main system. To increase efficiency in the city, São Paulo implemented in 2007 a bus rapid transit system called the Expresso Tiradentes. There is also a 725.7 km (450.9 mi) long system of reserved bus lanes, which are placed on large avenues and connected with the subway or suburban railway stations.

== Rail transport ==
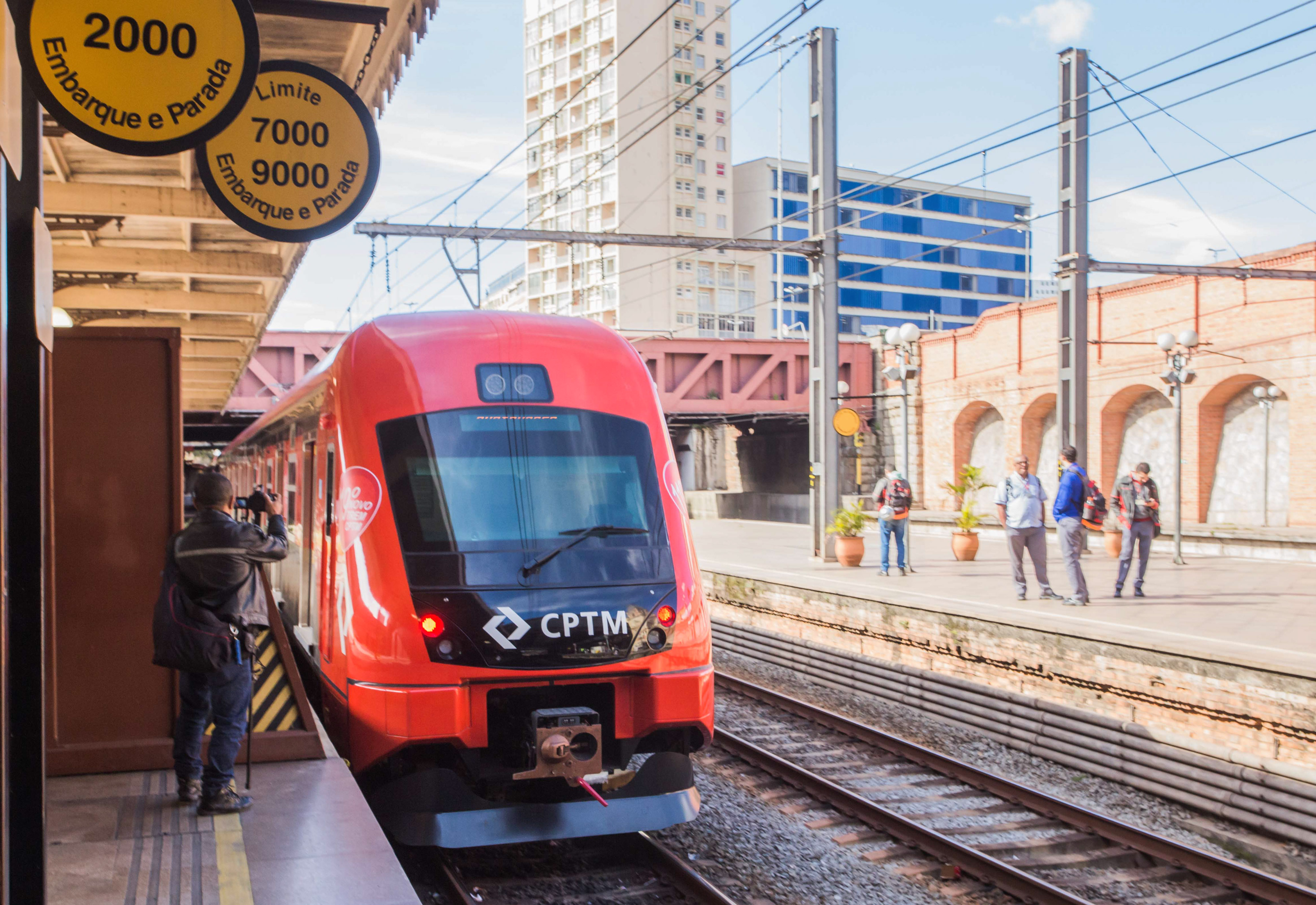
Train of CPTM.

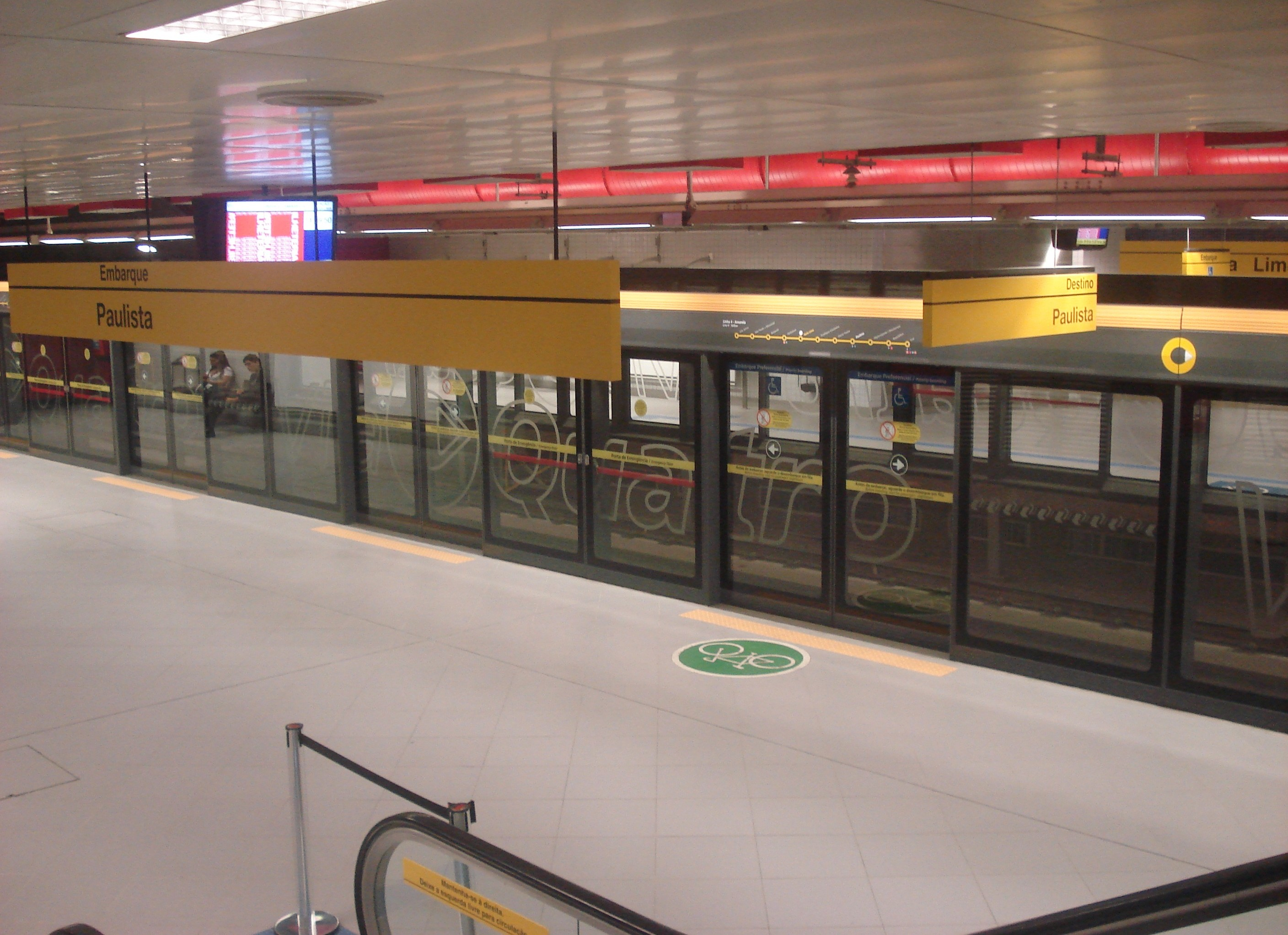
Faria Lima station, on Line 4 - Yellow.

With 13 lines, 187 stations and a total length of around 380 km (240 mi) (of which about 353 km or 219 mi is within the São Paulo Metropolitan Region boundaries), the São Paulo Metropolitan Rail Transport Network is the largest urban rail system in Latin America.

The rail network transports about 8,3 million people daily and it is operated by five different companies. Two are state-owned: Companhia do Metropolitano de São Paulo (Metrô-SP) and the Companhia Paulista de Trens Metropolitanos (CPTM). The other three are private: Motiva Linha 4, ViaMobilidade and TIC Trens.

Connections between the lines operated by different companies are usually free, with the only two exceptions being Tatuapé and Corinthians-Itaquera stations, where connections are paid during rush-hours and free during other periods.

=== Current network ===
The following lines are currently in operation:

Line	Terminals	Inauguration	Operating Company	Length (km)	Stations
1 Blue	Tucuruvi ↔ Jabaquara	September 14, 1974	Metrô-SP	20.2	23
2 Green	Vila Madalena ↔ Vila Prudente	January 25, 1991	Metrô-SP	14.6	14
3 Red	Palmeiras-Barra Funda ↔ Corinthians-Itaquera	March 10, 1979	Metrô-SP	22.0	18
4 Yellow	Luz ↔ Vila Sônia	May 25, 2010	Motiva Linha 4	12.8	11
5 Lilac	Capão Redondo ↔ Chácara Klabin	October 20, 2002	ViaMobilidade	19.9	17
7 Ruby	Palmeiras-Barra Funda ↔ Jundiaí	February 16, 1867 (São Paulo Railway)	TIC Trens	62.7	18
8 Diamond	Júlio Prestes ↔ Amador Bueno	July 10, 1875 (Estrada de Ferro Sorocabana)	ViaMobilidade	41.6	22
9 Emerald	Osasco ↔ Varginha	1957 (Estrada de Ferro Sorocabana)	ViaMobilidade	37.3	21
10; Turquoise	Palmeiras-Barra Funda ↔ Rio Grande da Serra	February 16, 1867 (São Paulo Railway)	CPTM	37.2	15
11; Coral	Palmeiras-Barra Funda ↔ Estudantes	1886 (Estrada de Ferro Central do Brasil)	CPTM	54.1	17
12; Sapphire	Brás ↔ Calmon Viana	1934 (Estrada de Ferro Central do Brasil)	CPTM	38.8	13
13; Jade	Engenheiro Goulart ↔ Aeroporto-Guarulhos	March 31, 2018	CPTM	12.2	3
15; Silver	Vila Prudente ↔ Jardim Colonial	August 30, 2014	Metrô-SP	14.6	11
17; Gold	Morumbi ↔ Washington Luís and Aeroporto de Congonhas Branch	March 31, 2026	ViaMobilidade	6.7	8
Total in operation:				395.8	211

=== Future network ===
The following lines are currently under construction or undergoing expansion. When completed, the network will total 450 km:

Line	Terminals	Inauguration	Length (km)	Stations
2 Green	Vila Prudente ↔ Dutra	To Vila Formosa 2027; To Penha 2028; To Dutra 2031	+14.5	+13
4 Yellow	Vila Sônia ↔ Taboão da Serra	2028	+3.3	+2
5 Lilac	Capão Redondo ↔ Jardim Angela	2028	+4.3	+2
6 Orange	São Joaquim ↔ Brasilândia	2026	15.3	15
11; Coral	Estudantes ↔ César de Sousa	2031	+4	+1
12; Sapphire	Calmon Viana ↔ Suzano	2031	+2.7	+1
13; Jade	Aeroporto–Guarulhos ↔ Bonsucesso + Engenheiro Goulart ↔ Gabriela Mistral	2032	+10.4	+8
15; Silver	Jardim Colonial ↔ Jacu-Pêssego + Ipiranga ↔ Vila Prudente	2026	+4.6	+3
Total under construction:			58	45
Total in operation and under construction:			453,8	256

The following lines are currently under project:

Line	Terminals	Length (km)	Stations	Status
14; Onyx	Bonsucesso ↔ Jardim Irene	41	23	Contract Signing in Q1 2026
16; Violet	Cardeal Arcoverde ↔ Cidade Tiradentes	32	25	Contract Signing in Q3 2026
19; Sky Blue	Anhangabaú ↔ Bosque Maia	16	15	Contract Signing in Q3 2026
20; Pink	Santa Marina ↔ Santo André	30	24	Contract Signing in Q3 2026

São Paulo had tram lines during the first half of the 20th century, but they were eradicated following the expansion of the bus system.

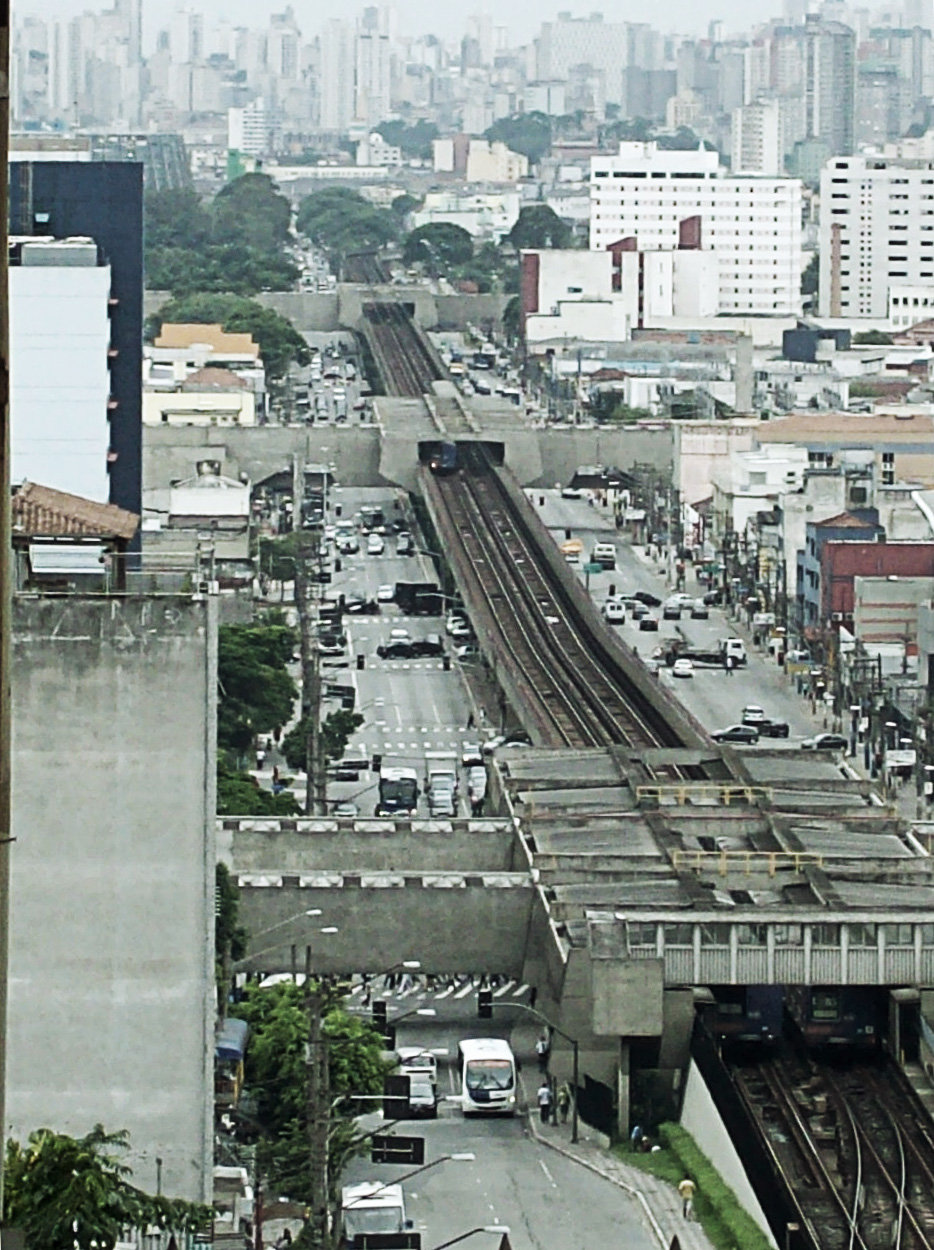
São Paulo Metro.

== Public Transportation Statistics ==
The average amount of time people spend commuting with public transit in São Paulo, for example to and from work, on a weekday is 93 min. 30% of public transit riders, ride for more than 2 hours every day. The average amount of time people wait at a stop or station for public transit (including buses) is 19 min, while 35% of riders wait for over 20 minutes on average every day. The average distance people usually ride in a single trip with public transit is 8.1 km (5.0 mi), while 18% travel for over 12 km (7.5 mi) in a single direction.

== Airfare ==
=== Airports ===
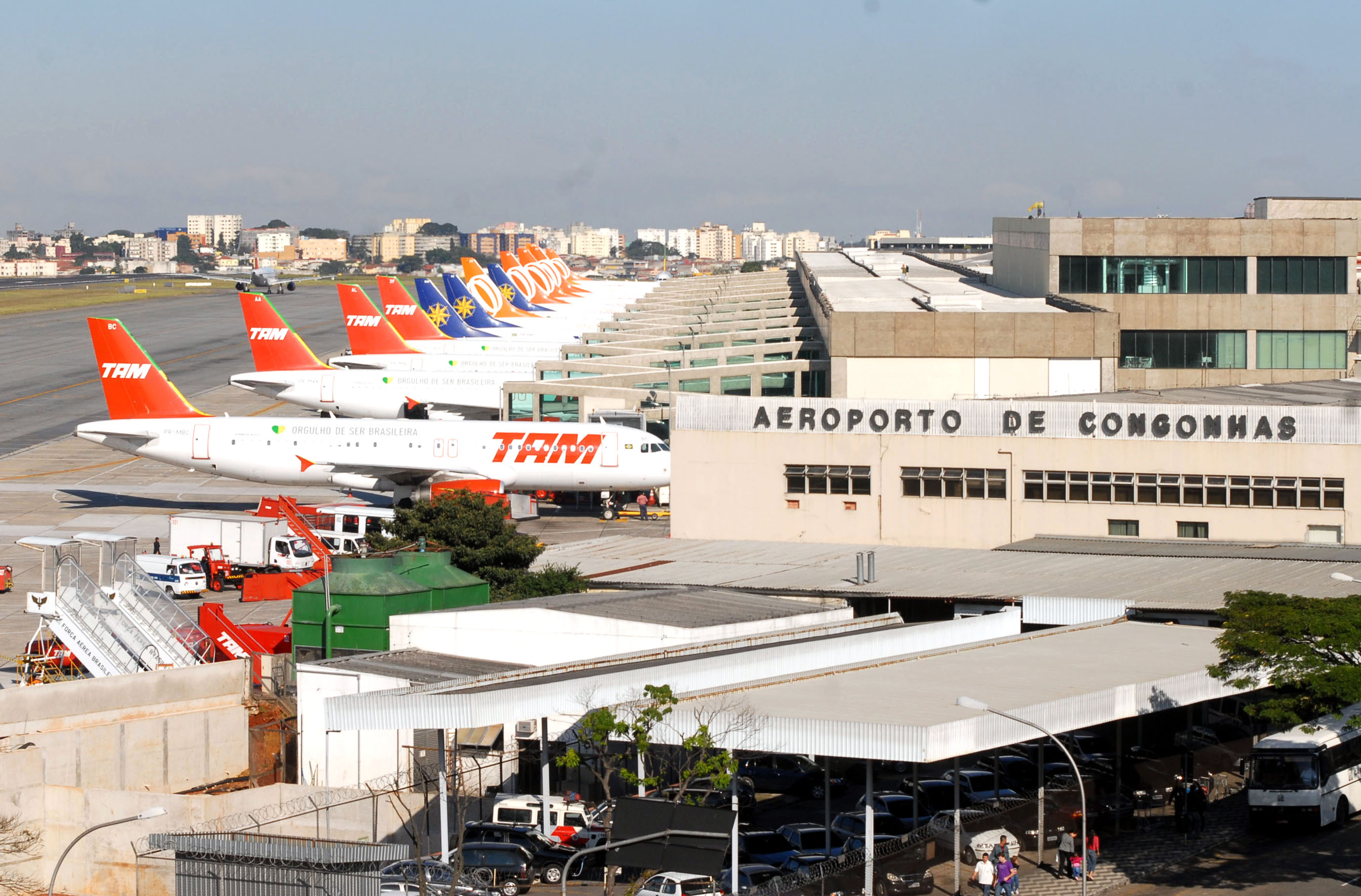
São Paulo–Congonhas Airport.

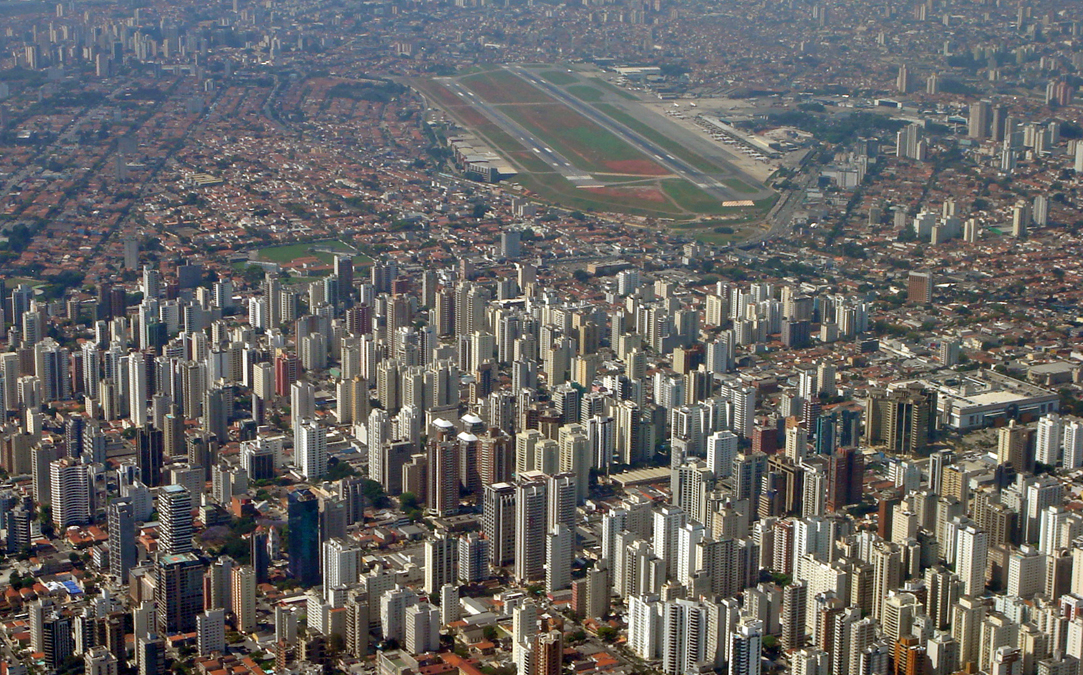
Aerial view Congonhas-São Paulo Airport.

São Paulo has three airports. Two of them, São Paulo/Guarulhos International Airport and Congonhas Airport are located in the metropolitan area, while the third, Campo de Marte, is located north of the city center. Campo de Marte also hosts the Ventura Goodyear Blimp. Viracopos International Airport is sometimes referred to as a São Paulo airport, though is located in Campinas, over 100 km away from the city.

Congonhas Airport operates domestic and regional flights, mainly to Rio de Janeiro, Belo Horizonte and Brasília. Guarulhos International Airport, also known to São Paulo locals as "Cumbica", is located 25 km (16 mi) North East of the city center, in the neighbouring city of Guarulhos. Guarulhos airport operates both domestic and international flights. Major Brazilian airlines handled by Congonhas Airport and Guarulhos Airport include TAM Airlines, Gol Transportes Aéreos, and Azul Brazilian Airlines. Campo de Marte airport handles some private and small-sized airplanes.

In 2006, about 34.3 million people used the city's airports (mainly from Congonhas and Guarulhos International Airport, the only two operating commercial flights). Infraero, Brazil's main aviation authority, estimates that with the remodelling of Guarulhos Airport, São Paulo's airports will be able to handle about 45 million passengers a year within the next five years.

Additionally São Paulo Catarina Executive Airport located in São Roque, opened in 2019 handles general aviation traffic.

=== Heliports ===
São Paulo has the largest fleet of helicopters in the world, with around 500 registered helicopters and 700 flights per day in the city. The owners are an elite wealthy class who take advantage of approximately one hundred helipads and heliports to conveniently avoid heavy traffic. In addition, there are many air taxi companies in the city, used mostly by the upper class to travel between São Paulo and Rio de Janeiro.

== Motorways ==
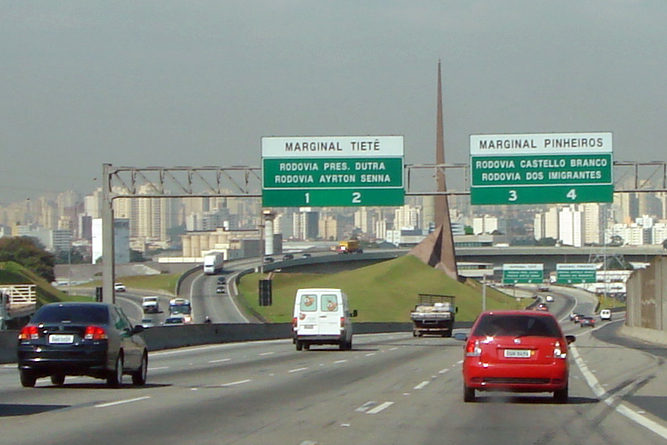
Bandeirantes highway, one of the main lines connecting with the interior of the state of São Paulo. In the photo to enter the city of São Paulo.

=== Roads ===
Many Brazilian highways pass through or start in São Paulo itself, including the BR-116, Rodovia dos Bandeirantes, Rodovia Raposo Tavares, the Rodovia Anhangüera, Rodovia dos Imigrantes, Rodovia Castelo Branco, and Via Dutra.

==== Rodoanel ====
The Rodoanel Mario Covas (SP-21) (also known as Rodoanel Metropolitano de São Paulo or simply Rodoanel) is a motorway being built around the center of the metropolitan region of São Paulo in an attempt to alleviate traffic intensity of trucks along the city's two riverside highways (Pinheiros and Tietê).

The Rodoanel is being constructed as a multi-lane, limited-access freeway, with large sections to be built in unoccupied regions: along the edge of forests, close to residential areas, etc. This is in an effort to prevent squatting and development in environmentally sensitive areas along the route. Construction is being carried out in four phases: west, south, east and north. As of mid-2010, the west and south section have been completed. The beginning of construction on the east section is planned for February 2011. Due to the rougher terrain and environmental concerns, there is no projected date for the initiation of construction on the northern section.

==== Travel restrictions ====
Similar to the Hoy No Circula program in Mexico, São Paulo has implemented restrictions on travel to maintain the quality of air. Drivers must respect a certain schedule according to the last digit of their car's license plate number.

==== Interconnected roads ====
West (2002)	South (2010)	East (2014)	North (2018)
SP-332	Imigrantes	Ayrton Senna	Fernão Dias
Bandeirantes	Anchieta	Dutra	
Anhangüera		SP-66	
Castelo Branco			
Raposo Tavares			
Régis Bittencourt			
