= Consolação (São Paulo Metro) =

São Paulo Metro station

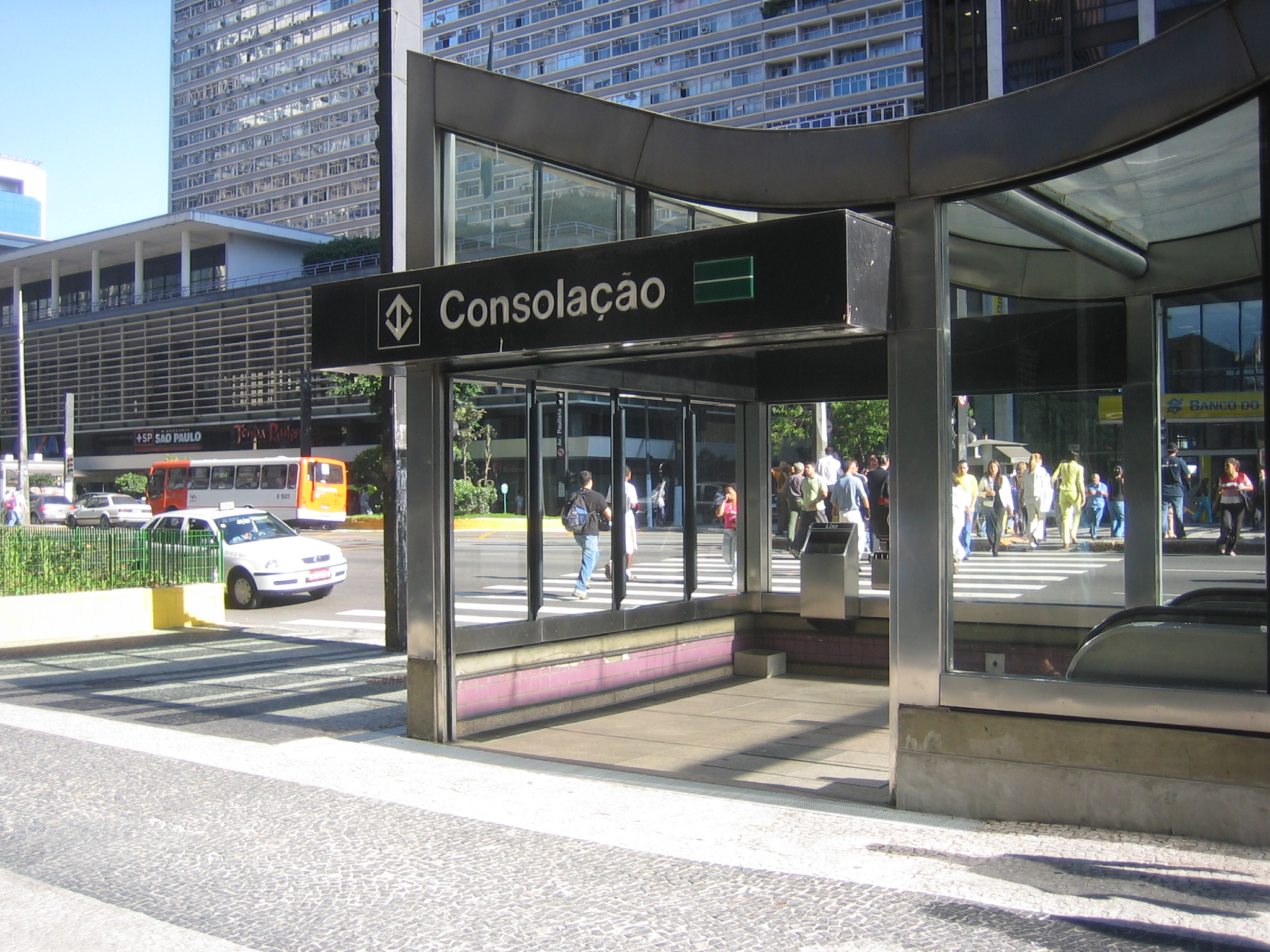
- Consolação station

General information
- Location: Av. Paulista, s/n, Consoloção; São Paulo; Brazil
- Coordinates: 23°33′27″S 46°39′39″W
- Owner: Government of the State of São Paulo
- Operator: Companhia do Metropolitano de São Paulo
- Platforms: Island platforms
- Connections: Paulista; Campo Limpo–Rebouças–Centro Bus Corridor

Construction
- Structure type: Underground
- Accessible: Y
- Architect: Renato Viégas and João Batista Martinez Corrêa

Other information
- Station code: CNS

History
- Opened: January 25, 1991; 35 years ago

Passengers
- 86,000/business day

Services
Preceding station	São Paulo Metro	Following station
Clínicas towards Vila Madalena	Line 2	Trianon-Masp towards Penha
Oscar Freire towards Vila Sônia-Professora Elisabeth Tenreiro	Line 4 transfer at Paulista-Pernambucanas	Higienópolis-Mackenzie towards Luz
Track layout
Location

Consolação is a station on Line 2 (Green) of the São Paulo Metro. A moving walkway connects to Paulista station on Line 4 (Yellow).

== Station layout ==
G	Street level	Exit/entrance
M	Concourse	Fare control, ticket office, customer service, Bilhete Único/TOP recharge machines
P Platform level
P Platform level	Northbound	← toward Vila Madalena
P Platform level	Island platform, doors open on the left, transfer to
P Platform level	Southbound	toward Vila Prudente →
