= Paulista (São Paulo Metro) =

São Paulo Metro station

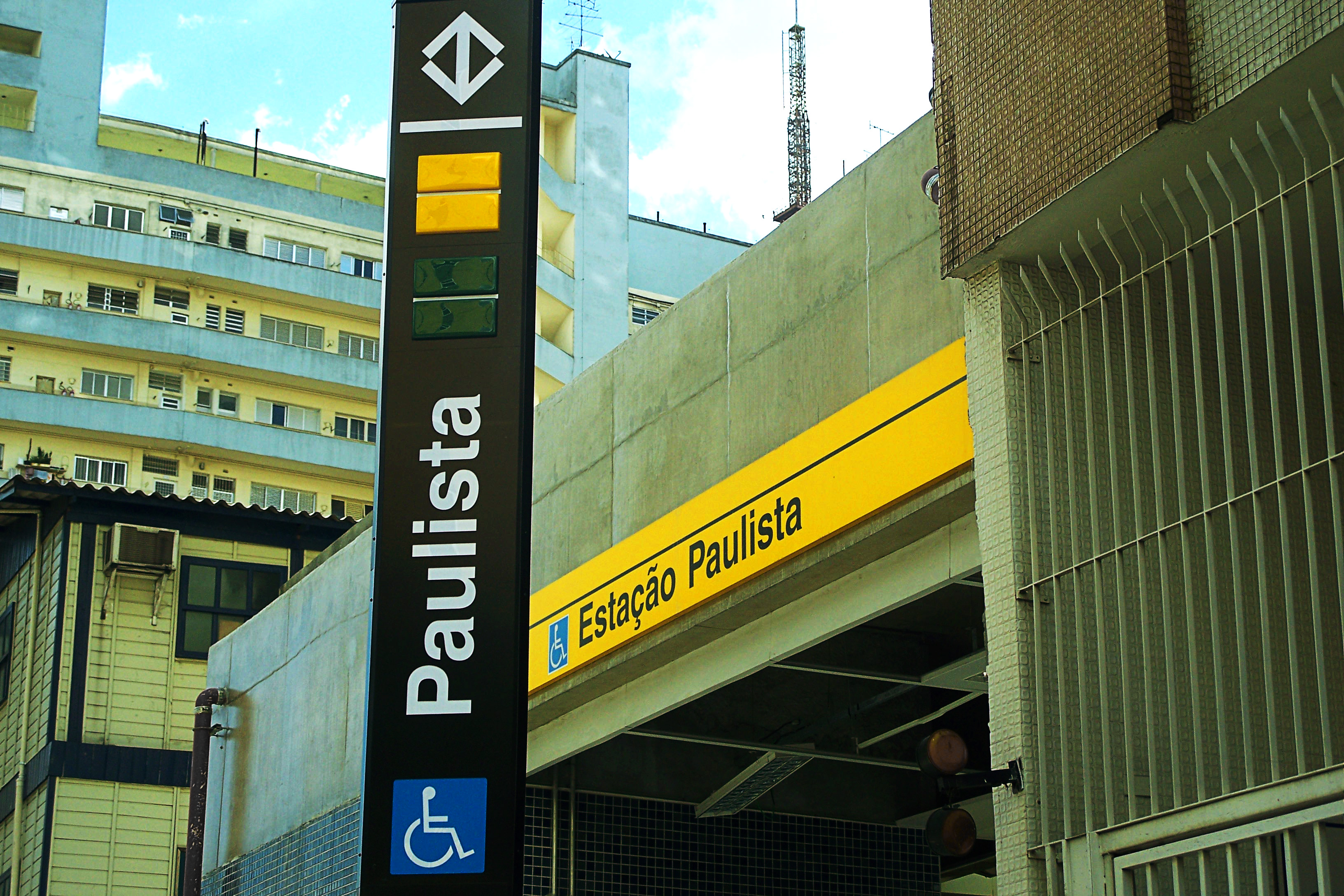
- Station access on Rua da Consolação

General information
- Location: Rua da Consolação, 2406, Consolação; São Paulo; Brazil
- Coordinates: 23.555131°S 46.662270°W
- Owner: Government of the State of São Paulo
- Operator: Motiva Linha 4
- Platforms: Side platforms
- Connections: Consolação; Campo Limpo–Rebouças–Centro Bus Corridor

Construction
- Accessible: yes

Other information
- Station code: PTA

History
- Opened: 25 May 2010

Passengers
- 89,550/business day

Services
Preceding station	São Paulo Metro	Following station
Oscar Freire towards Vila Sônia-Professora Elisabeth Tenreiro	Line 4	Higienópolis-Mackenzie towards Luz
Clínicas towards Vila Madalena	Line 2 transfer at Consolação	Trianon-Masp towards Penha
Track layout
Location

Paulista is a metro station on Line 4-Yellow of the São Paulo Metro, operated by Motiva Linha 4, and it's located in the Consolação district. It has free connection with Consolação station of Line 2-Green, operated by São Paulo Metro. The station was renamed after a naming rights contract was signed between ViaQuatro and retail store company Pernambucanas in April 2023.

== History ==
The first prediction of conclusion of the construction of the first phase stations, which included Paulista station, was 2008. Paulista station is 4 metres (13 ft) under the Line 2-Green tunnel. The excavation of the passage between the two stations in the hub, 30 metres (98 ft) below Paulista Avenue, caused heat in the operaries.

The station was initially scheduled to open in March 2010, but was delayed to 25 May 2010, day that the Line started its service, between Paulista and Faria Lima stations. The delay was caused by the train tests. With the start of the fee charge on 21 June 2010, the connection with Consolação station by moving walkway began.

== Characteristics ==
Underground station with side platforms and support rooms above the ground, with structures in apparent concrete and distribution catwalk in metallic structure, fixated with braces above the platform. It has access for people with disabilities and connection with Consolação station, of Line 2-Green. Its capacity is 150,000 passengers per hour (referring to joint capacity with Consolação).

The 300 metres (980 ft) connection between Paulista and Consolação stations has moving walkways, the first of the São Paulo Metro. There are 2 walkways, both 45 metres (148 ft) long and 1.1 metres (3.6 ft) wide, placed two by two, and are made by ThyssenKrupp. When no one is standing on them, they enter a energy saving mode, and regularly lubricate themselves. There were originally 6 walkways, which had a total of 20,000 passengers per hour. In 2019, 4 moving walkways were removed by the São Paulo Metro, with the objective to reduce the travel time between the stations. The users and operators alike informally called the crossing between the two stations as the "march of the penguins".

The station has 10 ViaQuatro attendance and maintenance agents and 10 attendance and security agents, beside ambulances.

== Station layout ==
G	Street level	Exit/entrance
M1	Concourse level 1	Fare control, ticket office, customer service, Bilhete Único/TOP recharge machines
M2	Concourse level 2	Distribution concourse, transfer to
P Platform level
P Platform level	Side platform, doors open on the right
P Platform level	Southbound	← toward Vila Sônia–Professora Elisabeth Tenreiro
P Platform level	Northbound	toward Luz →
P Platform level	Side platform, doors open on the right
