= Butantã (São Paulo Metro) =

São Paulo Metro station

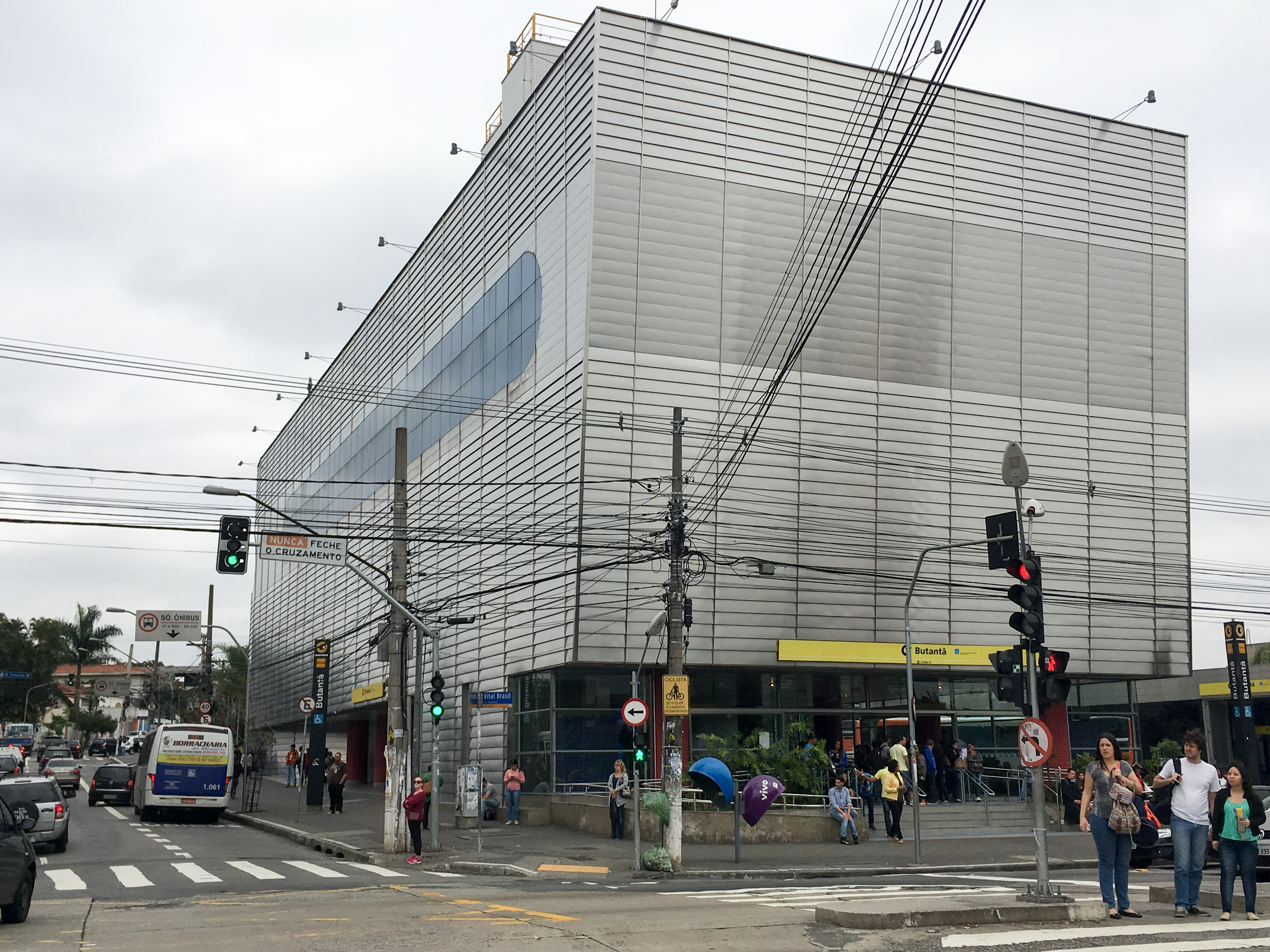
- The Butantã Subway Station in 2016

General information
- Location: Av. Vital Brasil, 427, Butantã; São Paulo; Brazil
- Owner: Government of the State of São Paulo
- Operator: Motiva Linha 4
- Platforms: Side platforms
- Connections: Butantã Bus Terminal; Itapevi–Butantã Metropolitan Corridor

Construction
- Structure type: Underground
- Accessible: y

Other information
- Station code: BUT

History
- Opened: 28 March 2011

Passengers
- 38,810/business day

Services
Preceding station	São Paulo Metro	Following station
São Paulo-Morumbi towards Vila Sônia-Professora Elisabeth Tenreiro	Line 4	Pinheiros towards Luz
Track layout
Location

Butantã is a metro station on Line 4-Yellow of the São Paulo Metro operated by Motiva Linha 4. It opened on 28 March 2011, covering an area of 12,987.25 square metres (139,793.6 sq ft), and it has disabled access. The station is located on Avenida Vital Brasil, 427. It has three entrances, and it connects with a SPTrans bus terminal adjacent to the station. It is planned to connect Line 4-Yellow with future Line 22 (Rebouças–Cotia).

== Characteristics ==
The station is located in Avenida Vital Brasil, 427, in a crossing with Rua Pirajussara. Is an underground station, with side platforms and support rooms above the ground level, with structures in concrete and a metallic structure catwalk, fixated with braces above the platforms. The ViaQuatro employees' offices and technical and operational rooms are located in external buildings, what would have avoided, according to the Metro, many expropriations.

The station has 9 ratchets, 14 escalators and 5 elevators, beside platform security doors (PSDs) in the platforms. It has access to people with disabilities and connection with urban bus terminal.

Its capacity was projected for an average of 35,000 daily passengers.

== Station layout ==
G	Street level	Exit/entrance
M1	Concourse level 1	Fare control, ticket office, customer service, Bilhete Único/TOP recharge machines
M2	Concourse level 2	Distribution concourse
P Platform level
P Platform level	Side platform, doors open on the right
P Platform level	Southbound	← toward Vila Sônia–Professora Elisabeth Tenreiro
P Platform level	Northbound	toward Luz →
P Platform level	Side platform, doors open on the right
