= Fradique Coutinho (São Paulo Metro) =

São Paulo Metro station

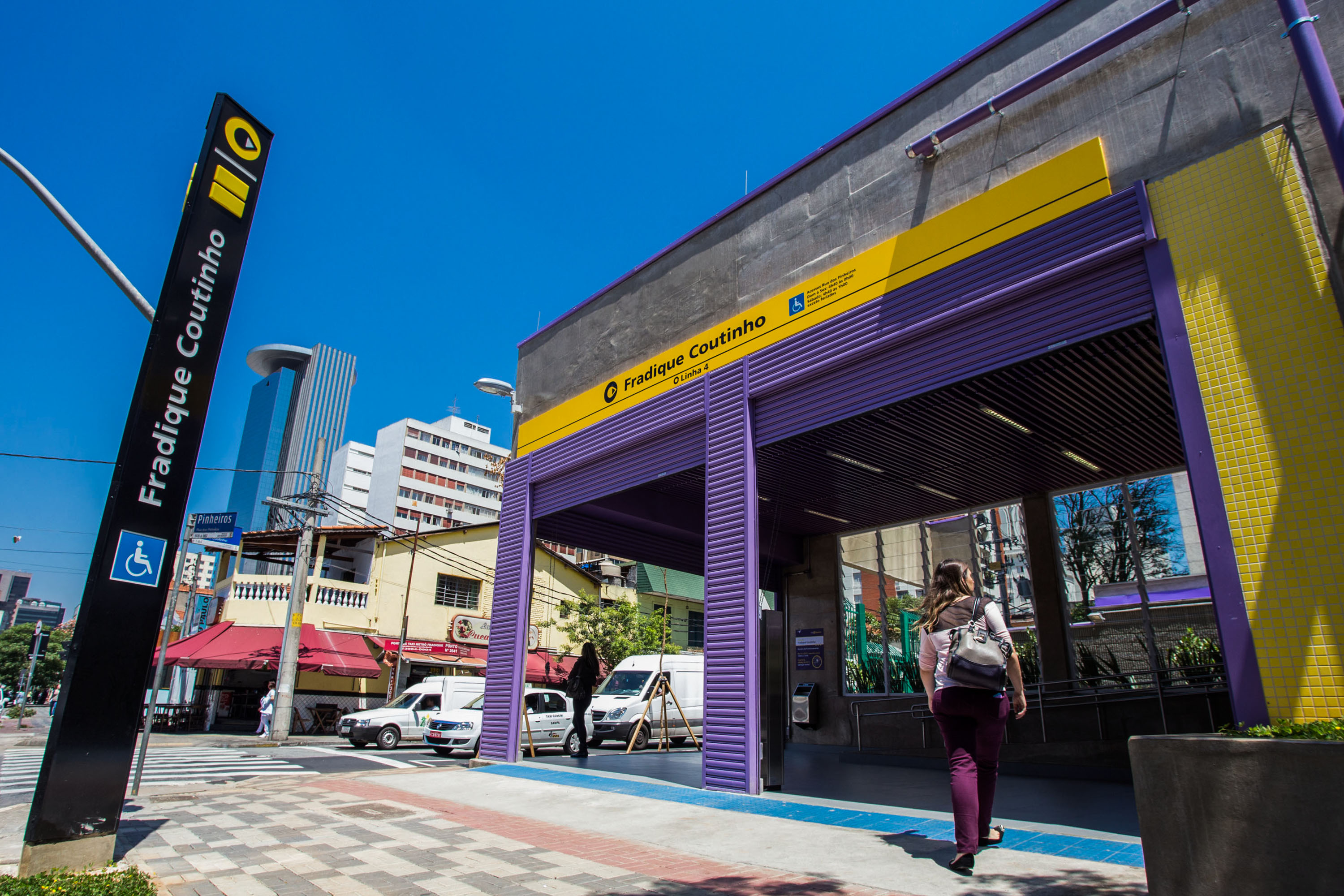
- Civil works at the station in 2014.

General information
- Location: Rua Fradique Coutinho × Rua dos Pinheiros, Pinheiros; São Paulo; Brazil
- Coordinates: 23.566169°S 46.684267°W
- Owner: Government of the State of São Paulo
- Operator: Motiva Linha 4
- Platforms: Side platforms

Construction
- Structure type: Underground
- Accessible: y

Other information
- Station code: FRA

History
- Opened: 15 November 2014

Passengers
- 14,060/business day

Services
Preceding station	São Paulo Metro	Following station
Faria Lima towards Vila Sônia-Professora Elisabeth Tenreiro	Line 4	Oscar Freire towards Luz
Future services
Teodoro Sampaio towards Santa Marina	Line 20 (proposed)	Tabapuã towards Pref. Celso Daniel-Santo André
Track layout
Location

Fradique Coutinho is a metro station on Line 4 (Yellow) of the São Paulo Metro operated by Motiva Linha 4. The station is located at Rua dos Pinheiros, 623 in the Pinheiros neighborhood. Although originally slated to open in 2010, the station was not inaugurated until 15 November 2014.

== History ==
The station construction were put at hold in 2007, when a report about the metallic structures was published, indicating the possibility of an "accident of unpredictable proportions". Metro and ViaQuatro disqualified the conclusion of the report and ensured that there was safety in the station. Specialists heard by Folha de S. Paulo said that there was no risk.

In the same year, the construction work in Rua dos Pinheiros lasted longer than the predicted after the asphalt broke after the passage of excavation equipment in the area, known as shield or "tatuzão". Any house was interdicted because of this problem. The same track had been closed for more than a year for construction work since June 2005 and has caused many traffic problems in the neighbourhood. In November 2005, an excavator that worked in the construction broke a Comgás pipe.

The opening was scheduled to 2010, but was delayed to 2012, 2014, and was predicted to open on the second semester of 2013, along with Oscar Freire station. The State Government scheduled the station opening for 25 September 2014 but, two days before, Governor Geraldo Alckmin announced the new prediction, this time for October. This new prediction also did not happen and, on 23 October 2014, the administration announced a new delay, this time for November.

== Toponymy ==
Fradique Coutinho is the name of the homonymous street that crosses the station. Fradique de Melo Coutinho was a bandeirante born in Espírito Santo, son of Vasco Fernandes Coutinho and Antônia Escobar and grandson of Vasco Fernandes Coutinho, which was the first Captain-major of the Captaincy of Espírito Santo. Fradique Coutinho participated of many expeditions, along with Simão Álvares Martins, his father-in-law, and Raposo Tavares. He died in São Paulo, on 28 January 1633. The Azevedo Marques and Estancieiro streets were renamed to Fradique Coutinho by the Municipal Executive Order no. 6,618, of 8 September 1966.

== Station layout ==
G	Street level	Exit/entrance
M	Concourse	Fare control, ticket office, customer service, Bilhete Único/TOP recharge machines
P Platform level
P Platform level	Side platform, doors open on the right
P Platform level	Southbound	← toward Vila Sônia–Professora Elisabeth Tenreiro
P Platform level	Northbound	toward Luz →
P Platform level	Side platform, doors open on the right
