= República (São Paulo Metro) =

São Paulo Metro station

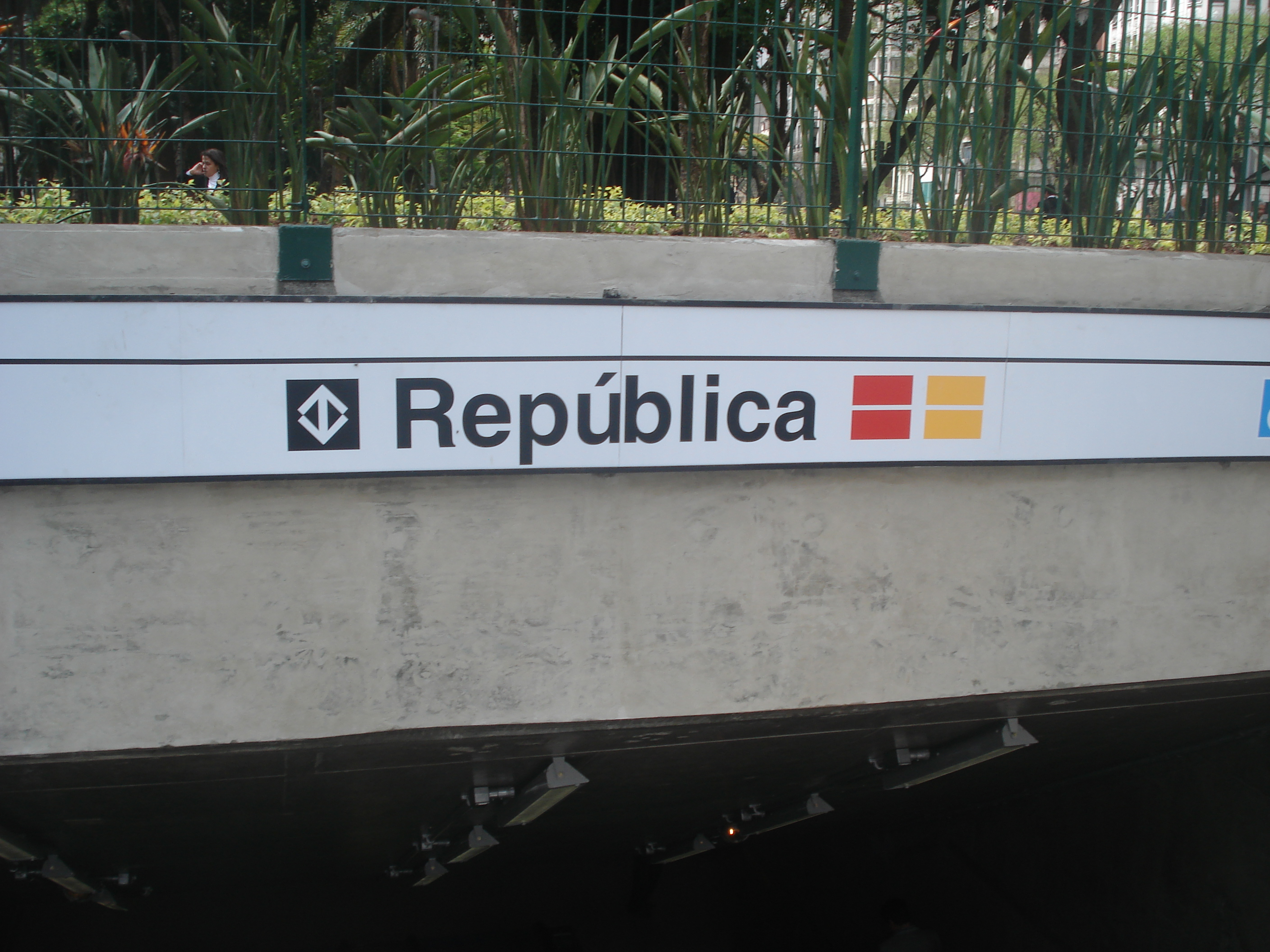
- Entrance of the station

General information
- Location: Rua do Arouche, 24, República; São Paulo; Brazil
- Coordinates: 23°32′39″S 46°38′34″W
- Owner: Government of the State of São Paulo
- Operator: Companhia do Metropolitano de São Paulo; Motiva Linha 4
- Platforms: Island and side platforms Side platforms

Construction
- Structure type: Underground
- Accessible: Y

Other information
- Station code: REP

History
- Opened: 24 April 1982; 15 September 2011

Passengers
- 121,000/business day 95,650/business day

Services
Preceding station	São Paulo Metro	Following station
Santa Cecília towards Palmeiras–Barra Funda	Line 3	Anhangabaú towards Corinthians-Itaquera
Higienópolis-Mackenzie towards Vila Sônia-Professora Elisabeth Tenreiro	Line 4	Luz Terminus
Track layout
Line 3
Line 4
Location

República is a metro station located in the República district, in the center zone of São Paulo. The stations connects the lines 3-Red, operated by Companhia do Metropolitano de São Paulo, and 4-Yellow, operated by Motiva Linha 4.

== Line 3-Red ==
=== History ===
Before the comments that Praça da República would be disfigured by the construction of the East-West Line, Mário Alves de Mello, Municipal Secretary of Metropolitan Transports, stated in November 1974: "There is a possibility to use the underground area, if the new plan needs the line to pass by Praça da República. Besides that, the technological advance and the technical order resources that the Metro Company has, even this occur, there is a possibility to avoid this rumored denaturation of the plaza. An example is what happened to Praça da Sé. After the end of the construction, the region will have the double of the plaza area. It would be foolishness of the administration, even in the benefit of the progress, harm the population and, specially, the residents and children of that area, who enjoy healthy leisure in the Praça da República."

The beginning of the construction of the station, in 1979, occurred with the closing of the street in front of the building of the State Secretariat of Education with blue walls. According to the head of the construction site, the neighbourhood didn't notice that construction had started because, beside the station was deep, the workers were being careful for the sand not bother the residents: "When the trucks leave the site, a worker removes, with shovel and water, the sand that is stuck in the tires. The construction brought us many technical innovations, as the use of rolling bridges with excavator shells - before, ramps were opened to allow trucks to go to the underground where the sand was removed - and the shoring in larger distances than the usual, proportioning cost reduction."

=== Characteristics ===
The station of Line 3-Red was opened on 24 April 1982. It is an underground station with two distribution levels and island and side platforms, and structure in apparent concrete. Its constructed area is of 39,050 square metres (420,300 sq ft) and it has capacity of 80,000 passengers per hour during peak hours.

== Line 4-Yellow ==
=== History ===
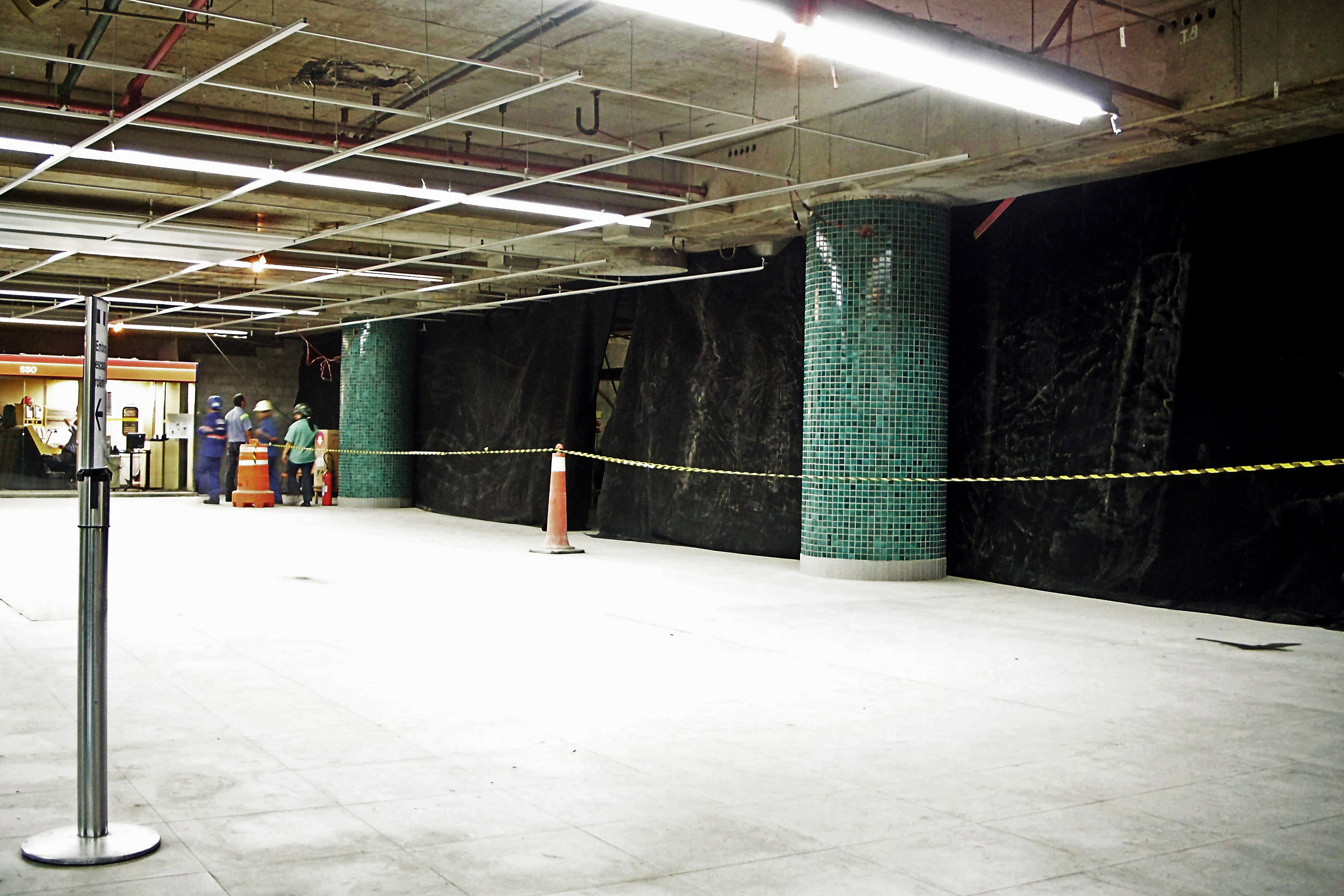
Construction for the connection with Line 4.

The station was already planned to receive, beside the current Line 3-Red, the line then known as Southeast-Southwest, which gave place to the current Line 4-Yellow.

One of the connection stations of the Line 4-Yellow, República was closed for more than a day between 2 and 3 May 2009, so the shield could pass across. The machine was there since January, after excavating the main tunnel since Faria Lima station. The operation of passage from a side to another in the station involved 320 people and caused turmoil, specially because it happened during Virada Cultural, which lasted 24 hours, in which the subway was working uninterrupted. The route between Anhangabaú and Santa Cecília stations, next to the República station, was made in 36 free buses, but that didn't avoid long lines in the platforms and escalators. The line was divided in two tracks, one between stations Palmeiras-Barra Funda and Santa Cecília, and another between Anhangabaú and Corinthians-Itaquera. The prediction was that the paralisation would occur between 1 a.m. on 2 May and midnight on 3 May, but lasted less than 32 hours, being reopened on 8:45 a.m. on 3 May. "We've made everything to minimize the impact, as we already suffered a little bit in the day before with the accumulation of people", said to the Jornal da Tarde the Metro operations manager, Wilmar Fratini.

The deliver of the connection with Line 4 was rescheduled eight times since 2001, and the prediction of the State Government on the beginning of 2011 was that it would be opened in the end of the year, along with Luz station. Later, the Government anticipated the opening to October, then end of September, and finally 15 September. The station began operating from 10 a.m. to 3 p.m. On 23 September, the time was increased to 9 a.m. to 4 p.m. and, since 26 September, from 4:40 a.m. to midnight.

=== Characteristics ===
The station of Line 4-Yellow was opened on 15 September 2011. It is located under Praça da República, in the structure of the station constructed before. It has side platforms and a constructed area of 6,190.92 square metres (66,638.5 sq ft).

Because of the different architecture styles, architect Cláudia Chemin, which handled the construction of the space dedicated to Line 4, said that she cared about "doing a nice transition between the two finish styles". For her, this would show the evolution of the materials used in the almost 30 years that separate the construction of the two parts of the station.

== Station layout ==
G	Street level	Exit/entrance
M1	Concourse level 1	Fare control, ticket office, customer service, Bilhete Único/TOP recharge machines, transfer to
P1; Platform level 1
P1; Platform level 1	Side platform, doors open on the right
P1; Platform level 1	Southbound	← toward Vila Sônia–Professora Elisabeth Tenreiro
P1; Platform level 1	Northbound	toward Luz →
P1; Platform level 1	Side platform, doors open on the right
M2	Concourse level 2	Distribution concourse, transfer to
P2; Platform level 2
P2; Platform level 2	Side platform, doors open on the right
P2; Platform level 2	Westbound	← toward Palmeiras-Barra Funda
P2; Platform level 2	Island platform, doors open on the left
P2; Platform level 2	Eastbound	toward Corinthians-Itaquera →
P2; Platform level 2	Side platform, doors open on the right
