= Oscar Freire (São Paulo Metro) =

São Paulo Metro station

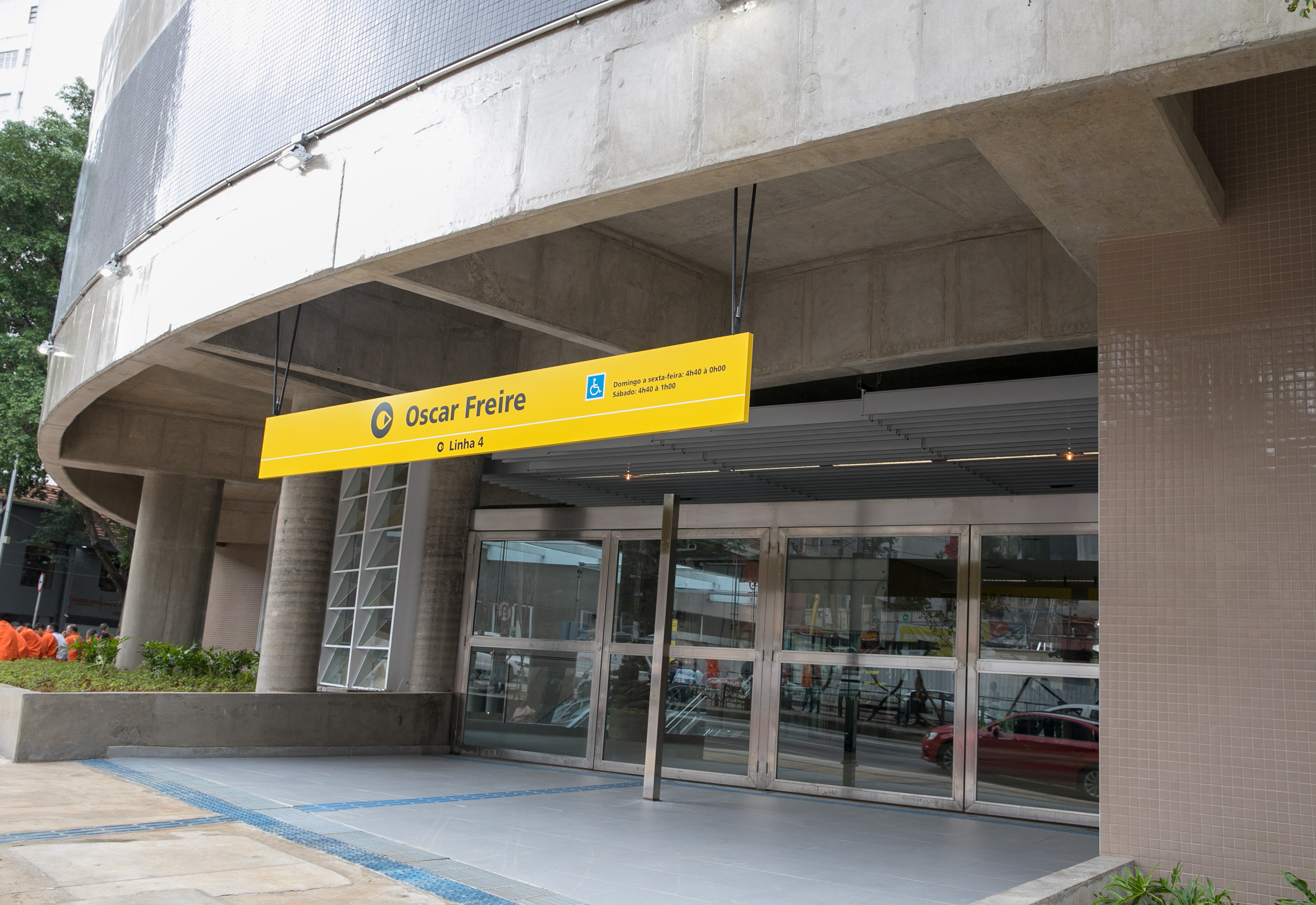
- Entrance to the station on its opening day

General information
- Location: Av. Rebouças × R. Oscar Freire; São Paulo; Brazil
- Owner: Government of the State of São Paulo
- Operator: Motiva Linha 4
- Platforms: Side platforms
- Connections: Campo Limpo–Rebouças–Centro Bus Corridor

Construction
- Structure type: Underground
- Accessible: y
- Architect: Luiz Carlos Esteves

Other information
- Station code: FRE

History
- Opened: 4 April 2018

Passengers
- 19,590/business day

Services
Preceding station	São Paulo Metro	Following station
Fradique Coutinho towards Vila Sônia-Professora Elisabeth Tenreiro	Line 4	Paulista towards Luz
Future services
Terminus	Line 16 (proposed)	Nove de Julho towards Cidade Tiradentes
Track layout
Location

Oscar Freire is a station on Line 4-Yellow of the São Paulo Metro operated by Motiva Linha 4. Its opening was scheduled for 2017, same year of the opening of Higienópolis-Mackenzie station. After its opening date was delayed many times, on 31 March 2018, during opening ceremony of CPTM Line 13-Jade, Governor Geraldo Alckmin finally confirmed the opening of Oscar Freire station for 4 April 2018. On 21 April 2018, it started working in full commercial time.

== Characteristics ==
Station in the underground with side platforms and support rooms above the ground, with apparent concrete structures and distribution catwalk in metallic structure, fixated with braces above the platform. It has access for people with disabilities.

== Station layout ==
G	Street level	Exit/entrance
M	Concourse	Fare control, ticket office, customer service, Bilhete Único/TOP recharge machines
P Platform level
P Platform level	Side platform, doors open on the right
P Platform level	Southbound	← toward Vila Sônia–Professora Elisabeth Tenreiro
P Platform level	Northbound	toward Luz →
P Platform level	Side platform, doors open on the right
