= Higienópolis-Mackenzie (São Paulo Metro) =

São Paulo Metro station

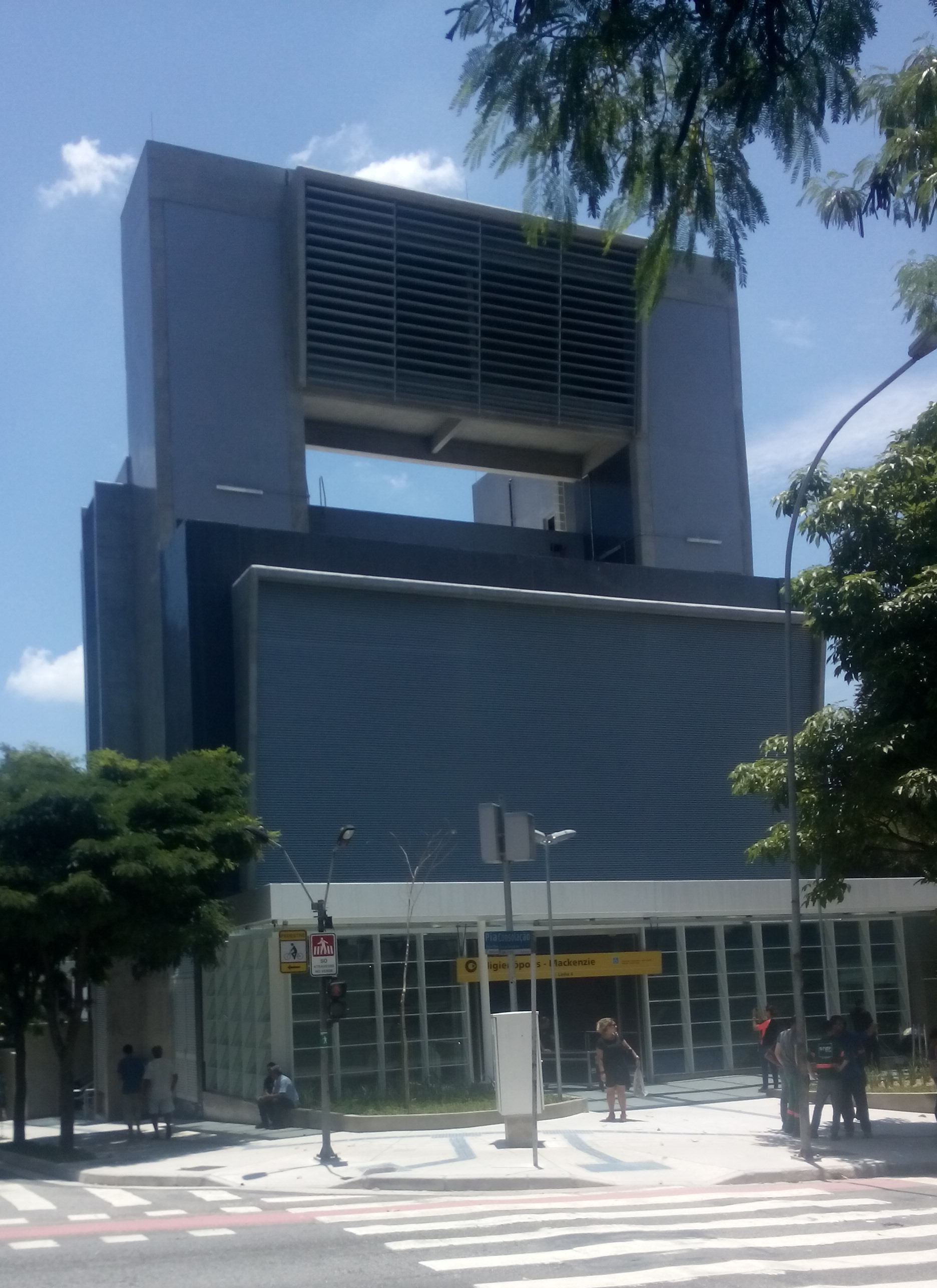
- entrance to the station on its inauguration day

General information
- Location: Rua da Consolação × Rua Piauí; Rua da Consolação × Rua Sergipe, Consolação; São Paulo; Brazil
- Coordinates: 23.5488889°S 46.6519444°W
- Owner: Government of the State of São Paulo
- Operator: Motiva Linha 4 LinhaUni
- Platforms: Side platforms

Construction
- Structure type: Underground
- Accessible: Yes

Other information
- Station code: HIG

History
- Opened: 23 January 2018
- Opening: 2027
- Former names: Higienópolis

Passengers
- 22,210/business day

Services
Preceding station	São Paulo Metro	Following station
Paulista towards Vila Sônia-Professora Elisabeth Tenreiro	Line 4	República towards Luz
Future services
FAAP-Pacaembu towards Brasilândia	Line 6	14 Bis-Saracura towards São Joaquim
Track layout
Line
Line
Location

Higienópolis-Mackenzie is a station on Line 4-Yellow of the São Paulo Metro, operated by Motiva Linha 4. Named after the historic name for part of the Consolação district and the nearby Mackenzie Presbyterian University, it was opened on 23 January 2018. The station will have a connection with future Line 6-Orange. The construction of the Line 6 station began in April 2015.

== History ==
The station was predicted to open before the end of the second semester of 2017. But, on 27 December 2017, the State Government of São Paulo delayed the opening to January 2018, because the Secretariat of Metropolitan Transports reported that there were glasses that needed to be installed. This caused a fine to the responsible consortium for the construction amounting to R$ 17 million (US$ 4,652,690.35) because of the delay. Therefore, the station would be delivered with the delay of almost four years, as in the first predictions it was scheduled to open in mid-2014. On 19 January 2018, it was announced the official opening date: 23 January 2018. On the Line 6-Orange, the predicted opening date was end of 2021. When it's totally concluded in both lines, the station will be the deepest of all Latin America, being at 69 m (226 ft) from the surface, corresponding to a 14-floors building.

== Station layout ==
G	Street level	Exit/entrance
M1	Concourse level 1	Fare control, ticket office, customer service, Bilhete Único/TOP recharge machines, future transfer to
P1; Platform level 1
P1; Platform level 1	Side platform, doors open on the right
P1; Platform level 1	Southbound	← toward Vila Sônia–Professora Elisabeth Tenreiro
P1; Platform level 1	Northbound	toward Luz →
P1; Platform level 1	Side platform, doors open on the right
S1	Stairs level 1	Future transfer to
S2	Stairs level 2	Future transfer to
S3	Stairs level 3	Future transfer to
M2	Concourse level 2	Distribution concourse
P2; Platform level 2
P2; Platform level 2	Side platform, doors open on the right
P2; Platform level 2	Northbound	← toward Brasilândia
P2; Platform level 2	Southbound	toward São Joaquim →
P2; Platform level 2	Side platform, doors open on the right

== See also ==
- Vai-Vai
