= Faria Lima (São Paulo Metro) =

São Paulo Metro station

Faria Lima–PagBank
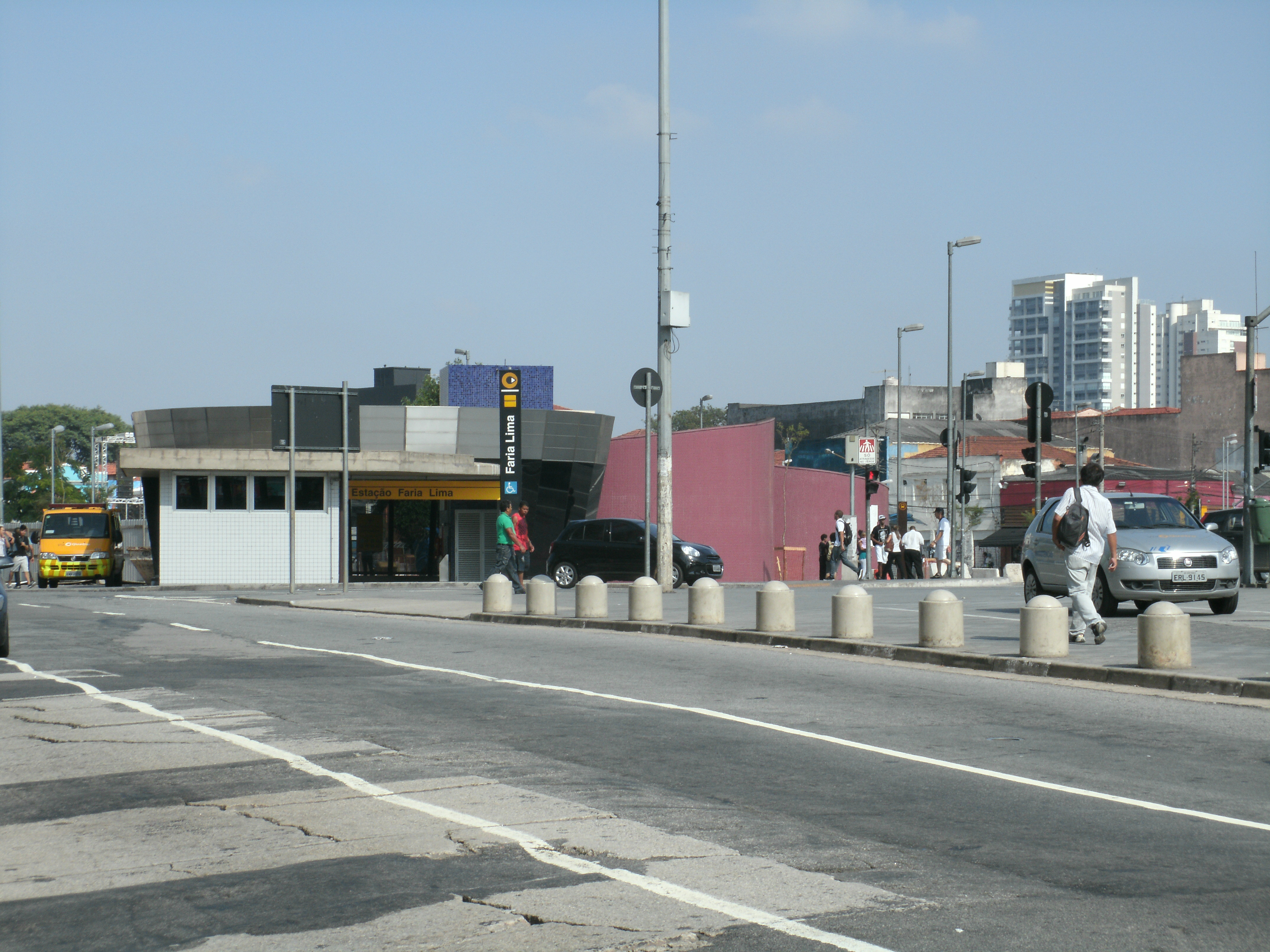

General information
- Location: Av. Brigadeiro Faria Lima, 950, Pinheiros; São Paulo; Brazil
- Coordinates: 23°34′00″S 46°41′38″W
- Owner: Government of the State of São Paulo
- Operator: Motiva Linha 4
- Platforms: Side platforms

Construction
- Structure type: Underground
- Accessible: y

Other information
- Station code: FAL

History
- Opened: 25 May 2010

Passengers
- 27,560/business day

Services
Preceding station	São Paulo Metro	Following station
Pinheiros towards Vila Sônia-Professora Elisabeth Tenreiro	Line 4	Fradique Coutinho towards Luz
Track layout
Location

Faria Lima, also known as Faria Lima–PagBank for sponsorship reasons, is a metro station on Line 4-Yellow of the São Paulo Metro operated by Motiva Linha 4. It is localized in Avenida Brigadeiro Faria Lima, between Rua Teodoro Sampaio and Rua Cardeal Arcoverde, in the district of Pinheiros. Had its civil construction concluded in February 2010. The prediction for the commercial operation was March 2010, but was delayed to 25 May 2010, day which line started operating between stations Faria Lima and Paulista. The delay was caused by the train tests. The station should also have a connection with future Line 20-Pink (Santa Marina–Santo André).

== Characteristics ==
Underground station with side platforms and structure in apparent concrete. It has access for people with disabilities and connection with urban bus terminal. It has capacity for 30,000 passengers per hour during peak hours.

The station has 10 ViaQuatro customer service and maintenance agents and 10 customer service and security agents, beside ambulances in the location.

== Station layout ==
G	Street level	Exit/entrance
M	Concourse	Fare control, ticket office, customer service, Bilhete Único/TOP recharge machines
P Platform level
P Platform level	Side platform, doors open on the right
P Platform level	Southbound	← toward Vila Sônia–Professora Elisabeth Tenreiro
P Platform level	Northbound	toward Luz →
P Platform level	Side platform, doors open on the right
