= Line 4 (São Paulo Metro) =

São Paulo Metro Line 4 (Yellow)

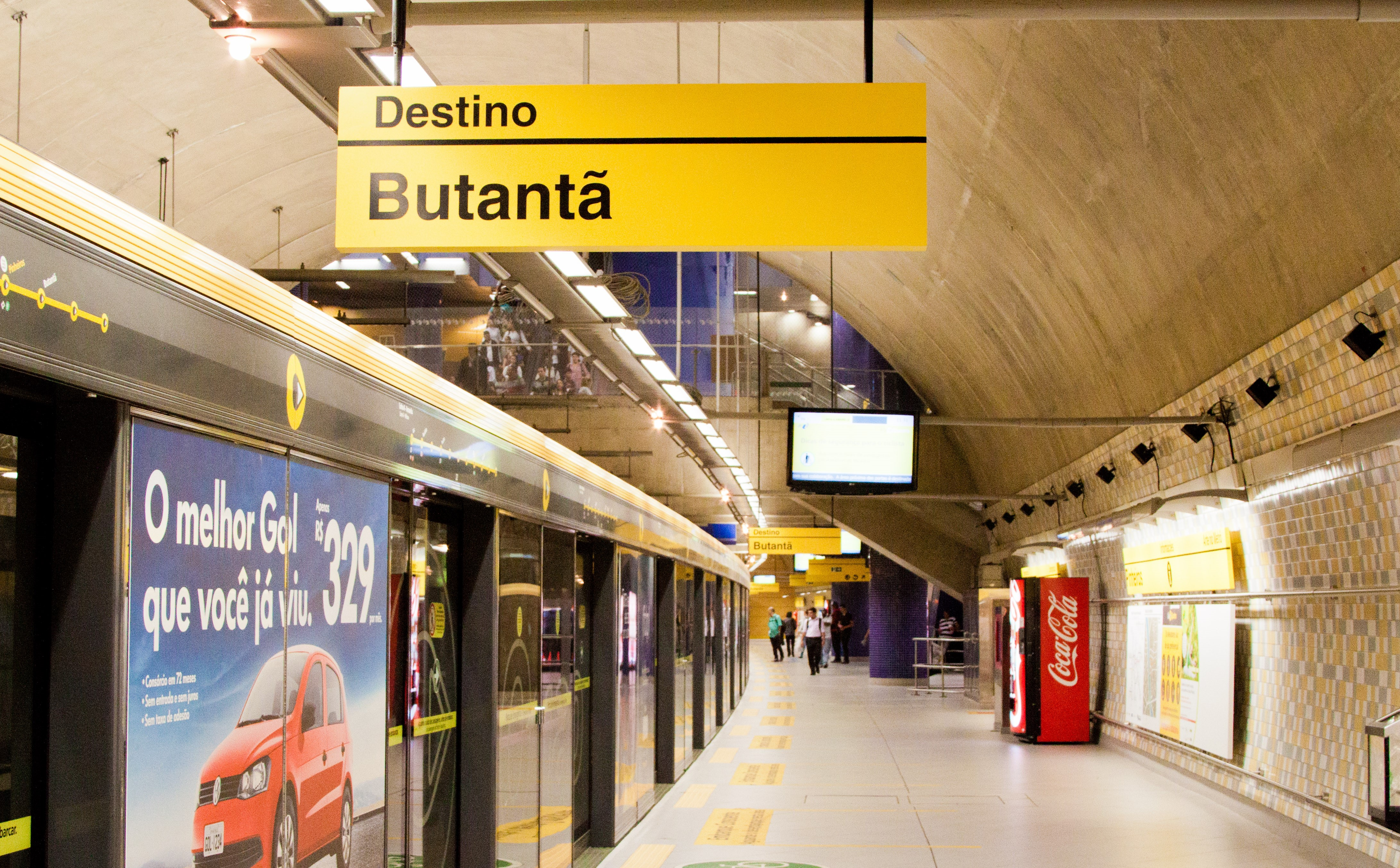
- Luz station, Line 4 platforms

Overview
- Status: Operating
- Owner: Government of the State of São Paulo
- Locale: São Paulo, Brazil
- Termini: Luz; Vila Sônia–Professora Elisabeth Tenreiro
- Connecting lines: Current: Future: Planned: 16 20
- Stations: 11 in operation 2 under construction
- Website: trilhos.motiva.com.br/viaquatro/

Service
- Type: Rapid transit
- System: São Paulo Metro
- Operator: Motiva Linha 4
- Depots: Vila Sônia rail yard; Paulista train park
- Rolling stock: 84 Hyundai Rotem Phase I (14 trains); 90 Hyundai Rotem Phase II (15 trains)

History
- Commenced: 2004
- Opened: May 25, 2010; 16 years ago
- Last extension: December 17, 2021

Technical
- Line length: 12.8 km (8.0 mi)
- Character: Underground
- Track gauge: 1,435 mm (4 ft 8 1/2 in) standard gauge
- Electrification: Overhead line, 1,500 V DC
- Operating speed: 80 km/h (50 mph)
- Signalling: Siemens Trainguard MT CBTC

Line 4 (Yellow) (Portuguese: Linha 4–Amarela) is one of the six lines that make up the São Paulo Metro and one of the thirteen lines that make up the São Paulo Metropolitan Rail Transportation Network. Originally called Southeast-Southwest Line, the line goes from Vila Sônia to Luz and currently has 11 stations along its 12.8 km (8.0 mi) and transports around 800,000 users/day. It is the most modern subway line in Latin America and the first line in the region to utilize driverless trains and platform screen doors in all stations.

The construction of the line was divided into two phases: The phase one was completed in 2011 and the phase two was partially inaugurated between 2014 and 2018 and was fully completed by 2021.

Now completed, Line 4 - Yellow goes from Vila Sônia to Luz station, in a 12.8 km (8.0 mi) long stretch. An expansion was announced in April 2025 that will add 3.3 km (2.1 mi) and two new stations, with an expected opening by 2028. It is operated by Motiva Linha 4, a private company which won the public-private partnership to operate Line 4 for 30 years, which can be renewable for another 30 years. Companhia do Metropolitano de São Paulo, the company operates some other lines in the São Paulo Metro, monitors the operation of the line.

== History ==
=== Conception ===
Conceived since the years 1940s, the route of Line 4-Yellow was present in all studies for deployment of the Metro in São Paulo since. This road was consolidated in 1968 when the initial studies for the implementation of the current subway network, receiving at that time, the name of Southeast-Southwest Line. In parable form, would connect the neighborhoods of Pinheiros and Sacomã, from Jóquei Clube station to Via Anchieta station, through the Downtown, cutting East-West line of the Metro in República and Pedro II stations. Integration platforms came to be built in those two stations, but were not used. The Republic station platforms, built in the 1980s, with a further configuration of line 4, would be demolished for the passage of the tunneling machine, equipment that built the tunnel of Line 4 between Faria Lima and Luz stations, those from Pedro II station became a depôt. The consolidation of the project was only in 1993, when the basic design was first developed, already no longer including the Southeast portion, embedded in other policies of the Metro expansion and improvement of commuter trains.

Even in the 1990s, the Metro considered taking Line 4 to Tatuapé station, with the intent to relieve the Line 3-Red. This idea was discarded, having been replaced by a possible expansion of the Line 2-Green until that section. The construction of the Expresso Tiradentes (formerly Fura-Fila), designed in the administration of mayor Celso Pitta and the first section delivered in 2007, further reinforced the intention to build Line 4 only in the vector southwest of the city, from Luz Station.

=== Construction ===
Construction was carried out in several phases, with trains initially operating from Luz to Butantã in Phase 1 with six stations, followed by five more stations and the full run from Luz to Vila Sônia in Phase 2.

On January 12, 2007, during the construction of Pinheiros station, a large part of the site's access tunnel collapsed, opening an 80 m (265 ft) diameter crater, killing seven people. Several houses and vehicles were swallowed by the hole, including a minibus; four of the victims were inside. A lot more houses suffered heavy damage, with several of these being declared condemned. Following Pinheiros' accident, Época magazine, aside Rede Globo, made a series of revelations about the security of the other line's stations, then still in building stage, dispensing special attention to the Paulista station, at Consolação quarter, a more heavily populated area, where a crater like that would have claimed a lot more lives. The line's works were kept paralysed for about two months. Because of the press' accusations, the timetable was delayed for about four months, and Pinheiros construction could only be resumed after the end of the analysis procedures designed to discover the accident's cause. The reports were delivered in August, 2008, representing a delay of almost two years on the station's works. After work on the line resumed, two teams were digging the tunnel (one from each end, planning to meet in the middle).

As the two tunnels ("Caxingui" and "Três Poderes") approached their meeting point, a horizontal error of 80 cm (31 in) between the two was discovered. The error was reported on 12 September 2007, and was caused by an error in topography. ViaQuatro said that there would be no delay or cost overruns due to this error.

In 2009 the Brazilian Federal Police opened an investigation into Camargo Corrêa enterprises about 14 of their construction works, including Line 4, as part of Operação Castelo de Areia ("Operation Sand Castle") looking into potential bribes paid to politicians.

During April 2010, at the site of São Paulo-Morumbi station, a 30 m (98 ft) crane fell while hoisting building material from the bottom of the site. The crane fell across the pavement of Ave Prof. Francisco Morato; there were no injuries and work was not interrupted.

The first stretch, between and Faria Lima and Paulista stations, opened on May 25, 2010. Four other stations, Butantã, Pinheiros, República and Luz were opened in 2011.

== Operation ==
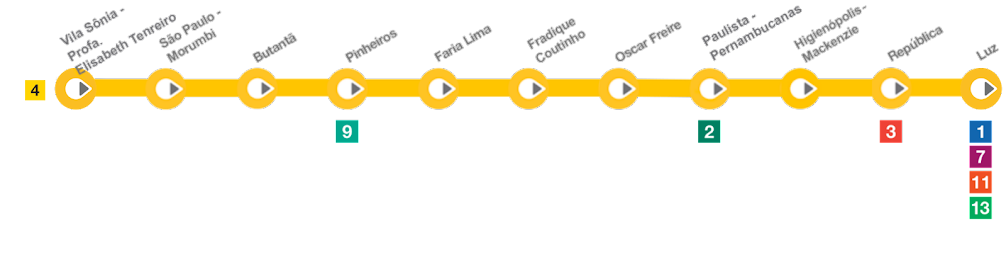

The line is the first completely driverless heavy-capacity metro in Latin America, where trains normally operate without drivers at the front; the space normally reserved for the cab has been replaced with extra passenger space and windows for passengers to look out.

The line uses standard gauge with a width of 1,435 mm (4 ft 8 1/2 in), and an overhead catenary power supply electrified at 1500 V DC (the only other line to use overhead catenary is line 5). This line is the first in São Paulo where all stations have platform screen doors, which would be later incorporated into all newly-opened stations and lines on the network. The trains use communications-based train control driverless technology, allowing them to operate with a distance of one train length apart when necessary. The entire line supports the reception of cellular signals, while there were originally plans to introduce Wi-Fi but have since been abandoned.

=== Contract ===
Built within the framework of a public–private partnership, line 4 of the São Paulo metro is operated and maintained, for a duration of 30 years, by the "ViaQuatro" concessionnaire through a contract awarded by the São Paulo state. ViaQuatro's shareholders are Companhia de Concessões Rodoviárias (CCR) at 75%, RuasInvest Participações at 15% and Mitsui & Co at 10%. For the establishment of operating rules, training, start-up and the launch of revenue service, ViaQuatro has benefitted from technical assistance by the Paris-based RATP Group through its subsidiary RATP Dev who held 1% of ViaQuatro shares until 2015.

=== Rolling stock ===
29 six-trains manufactured by Hyundai Rotem (i.e. a total of 174 cars) are used on the line. The length of each trainset is 128 metres (419 ft 11 in), and their capacity is 1,946 passengers, of which 306 are seated, a 25% increase from previous lines. The compositions, built in South Korea, have the driverless system, the first in Latin America, which allows the operation of the train without a driver. The cars are all interconnected by articulated corridors and also have air conditioning system. Initially, it was estimated that they would have cell phone signal and wireless internet access, but the Wi-Fi proposal was discarded and the cellular connection took months to be available on the line.

== Route ==
Code	Station	Platforms	Position	Connections	District
LUZ	Luz	Side platforms	Underground	Touristic Express	Bom Retiro
REP	República	Side platforms	Underground	Line 3 (São Paulo Metro)	República
HIG	Higienópolis–Mackenzie	Side platforms	Underground	(Future)	Consolação
PTA	Paulista	Side platforms	Underground	Campo Limpo–Rebouças–Centro Bus Corridor	Consolação
FRE	Oscar Freire	Side platforms	Underground	16 (Planned); Campo Limpo–Rebouças–Centro Bus Corridor	Jardim Paulista
FRA	Fradique Coutinho	Side platforms	Underground	20 (Planned)	Pinheiros
FAL	Faria Lima	Side platforms	Underground	-	Pinheiros
PIN	Pinheiros	Side platforms	Underground	Pinheiros Bus Terminal	Pinheiros
BUT	Butantã	Side platforms	Underground	Butantã Bus Terminal; Itapevi–Butantã Metropolitan Corridor	Butantã
MBI	São Paulo–Morumbi	Side platforms	Underground	(Planned); Morumbi Bus Terminal; Campo Limpo–Rebouças–Centro Bus Corridor	Morumbi
VSO	Vila Sônia–Professora Elisabeth Tenreiro	Side platforms	Underground	Vila Sônia Bus Terminal; Campo Limpo–Rebouças–Centro Bus Corridor; Vila Sônia–Taboão da Serra free shuttle bus	Vila Sônia
TBA	Chácara do Jockey	Side platforms	Underground	Campo Limpo–Rebouças–Centro Bus Corridor	Vila Sônia
TBA	Taboão da Serra	Side platforms	Underground	Taboão da Serra Bus Terminal (Planned)	Parque Santos Dumont (Taboão da Serra)

== See also ==
- Vai-Vai
