= Line 14 (CPTM) =

Line 14 - Onyx

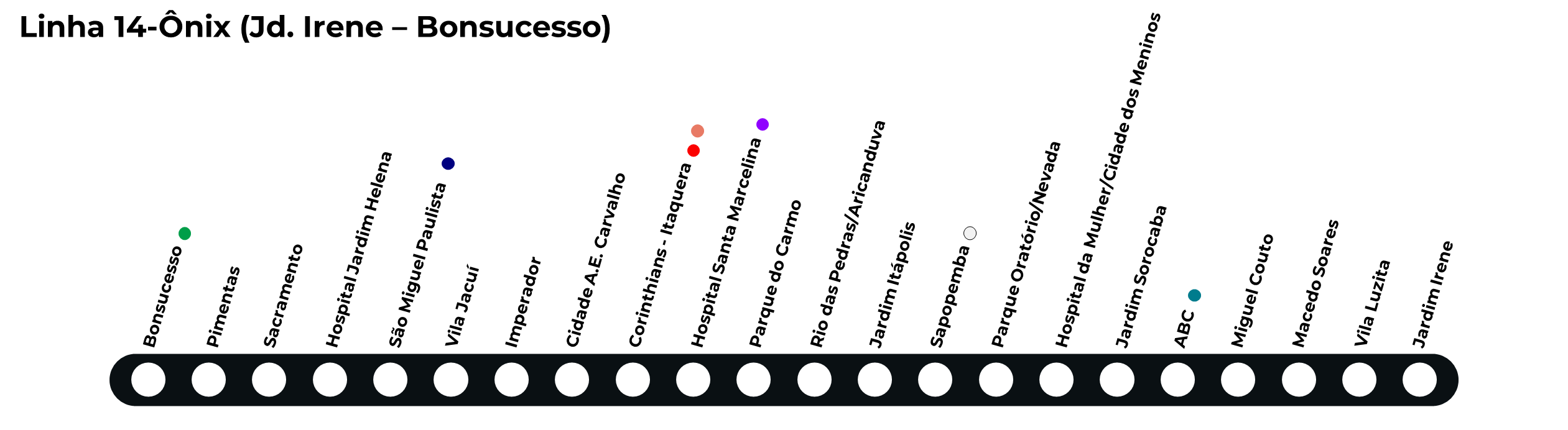
- Diagram of the stations on the current project.

Overview
- Status: Proposed
- Owner: Government of the State of São Paulo
- Locale: Greater São Paulo, Brazil
- Termini: Bonsucesso; Jardim Irene
- Connecting lines: 16
- Stations: 23

Service
- Type: Light rail (São Paulo State Government Original Plan). Commuter rail (Popular Will)
- System: São Paulo Metropolitan Trains
- Operator: CPTM

Technical
- Line length: 39 km (24 mi)
- Track gauge: 1,600 mm (5 ft 3 in)

Line 14 - Onyx (2013 Proposal)
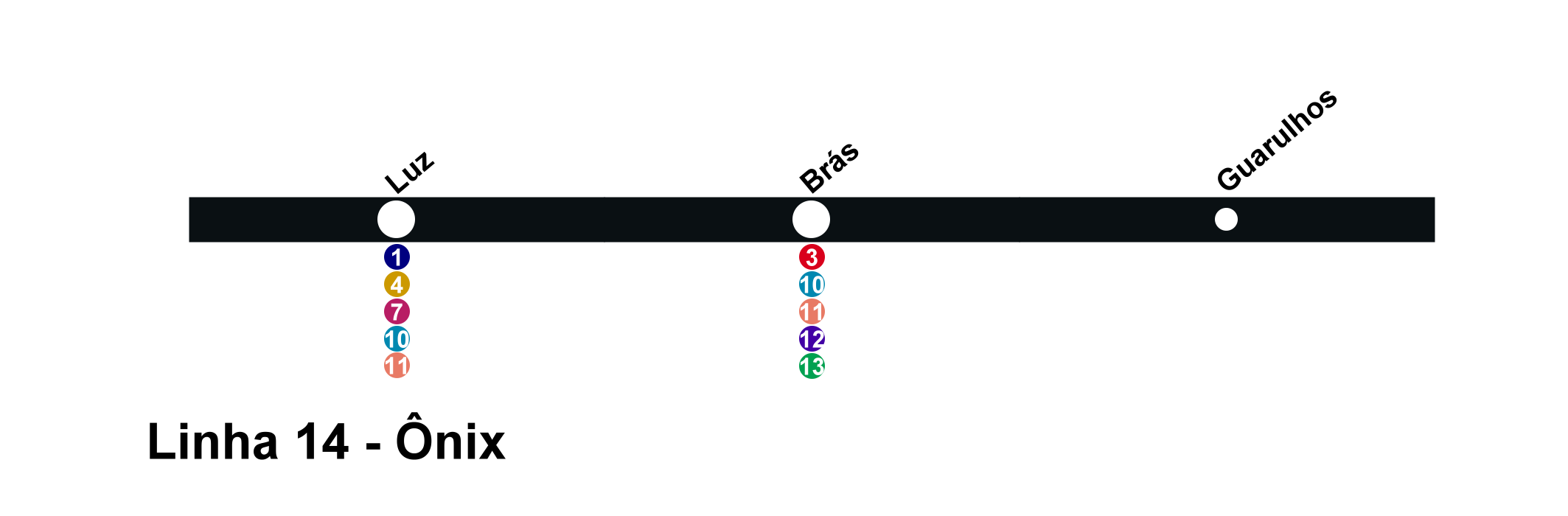

Overview
- Status: Cancelled
- Owner: Government of the State of São Paulo
- Locale: Greater São Paulo, Brazil
- Termini: Luz; Guarulhos
- Stations: 3

Service
- Type: Commuter rail
- System: São Paulo Metropolitan Trains
- Operator: CPTM

Technical
- Line length: 28 km (17 mi)
- Track gauge: 1,600 mm (5 ft 3 in)
- Electrification: 3,000 V DC catenary
- Operating speed: 80 km/h (50 mph)

The Line 14 - Onyx of the São Paulo Metro Rail Transport Network, also known as East Arc, is a projected line that will connect the cities of Guarulhos and Santo André, passing through the East Zone of São Paulo. The branch is characterized as a perimeter connection line, encircling the urban center and connecting to other existing and future railway lines and to the peripheral areas of the São Paulo Metropolitan Region. The original intention of the São Paulo State government was a construction of a Light rail.

However, after questions maded by the local comunities, the State Government choosed that the type and capacity of the trains will be decided by the winner company of the tender process.

Line 14 - Onyx (Portuguese: Linha 14–Ônix), formerly called the Airport Express, was first proposed as a line of the Companhia Paulista de Trens Metropolitanos commuter rail system in São Paulo, Brazil which would originally connect the São Paulo-Guarulhos International Airport to Brás Station. The line was planned to have an average interval of six minutes between each station.

On May 9, 2013, the Governor of São Paulo Geraldo Alckmin cancelled the former project, as it seemed no longer viable due to the Federal Government project to establish the Rio–São Paulo high-speed rail. Line 14 would have a special fare estimated in R$ 30.00 (ten times higher than the normal CPTM fare, R$ 3.00 as of 2013). Alternatively the planned Line 13 (Jade) shall be extended up to the airport and keeping the same standard fare prevailing in all CPTM's lines.

Although the State Government says that the current plan is to finish the constructions in progress, some preliminary details were revealed about the stations and character of the line.

On April 5, 2024, the Governor of São Paulo, Tarcísio de Freitas, announces the new route of Line 14 Onyx between Bonsucesso in Guarulhos and Jardim Irene in Santo André.

== Stations ==
=== Line 14–Onyx Station list - Current Proposal ===
Station	Connections	Municipality
Bonsucesso	Bonsucesso Bus Terminal (Planned)	Guarulhos
Pimentas	Pimentas Bus Terminal	Guarulhos
Sacramento	–	Guarulhos
Hospital Jardim Helena	–	São Paulo
São Miguel Paulista	Companhia Paulista de Trens Metropolitanos Line 12 (CPTM)	São Paulo
Vila Jacuí	–	São Paulo
Imperador	–	São Paulo
Cidade A. E. Carvalho	A. E. Carvalho Bus Terminal	São Paulo
Corinthians-Itaquera	Itaquera Bus Terminal	São Paulo
Hospital Santa Marcelina	16	São Paulo
Parque do Carmo	–	São Paulo
Rio das Pedras/Aricanduva	–	São Paulo
Jardim Itápolis	–	São Paulo
Sapopemba	Sapopemba/Teotônio Vilela Bus Terminal	São Paulo
Parque Oratório/Nevada	–	Santo André
Hospital da Mulher/Cidade dos Meninos	–	Santo André
Jardim Sorocaba	–	Santo André
ABC	Companhia Paulista de Trens Metropolitanos Line 10 (CPTM)	Santo André
Estádio	–	Santo André
Miguel Couto	–	Santo André
Macedo Soares	–	Santo André
Vila Luzita	Vila Luzita Bus Terminal	Santo André
Jardim Irene	–	Santo André

=== Line 14–Onyx Station List (Old proposal - Canceled in 2013) ===
Station	Platforms	Position	Connections	City
Luz	Island and side platforms	At-grade	Touristic Express	São Paulo
Brás	Island and side platforms	At-grade	Brás Bus Terminal	São Paulo
Guarulhos	Side platforms	Elevated	São Paulo/Guarulhos International Airport	Guarulhos
