= Line 16 (São Paulo Metro) =

São Paulo Metro Line 16 (Violet)

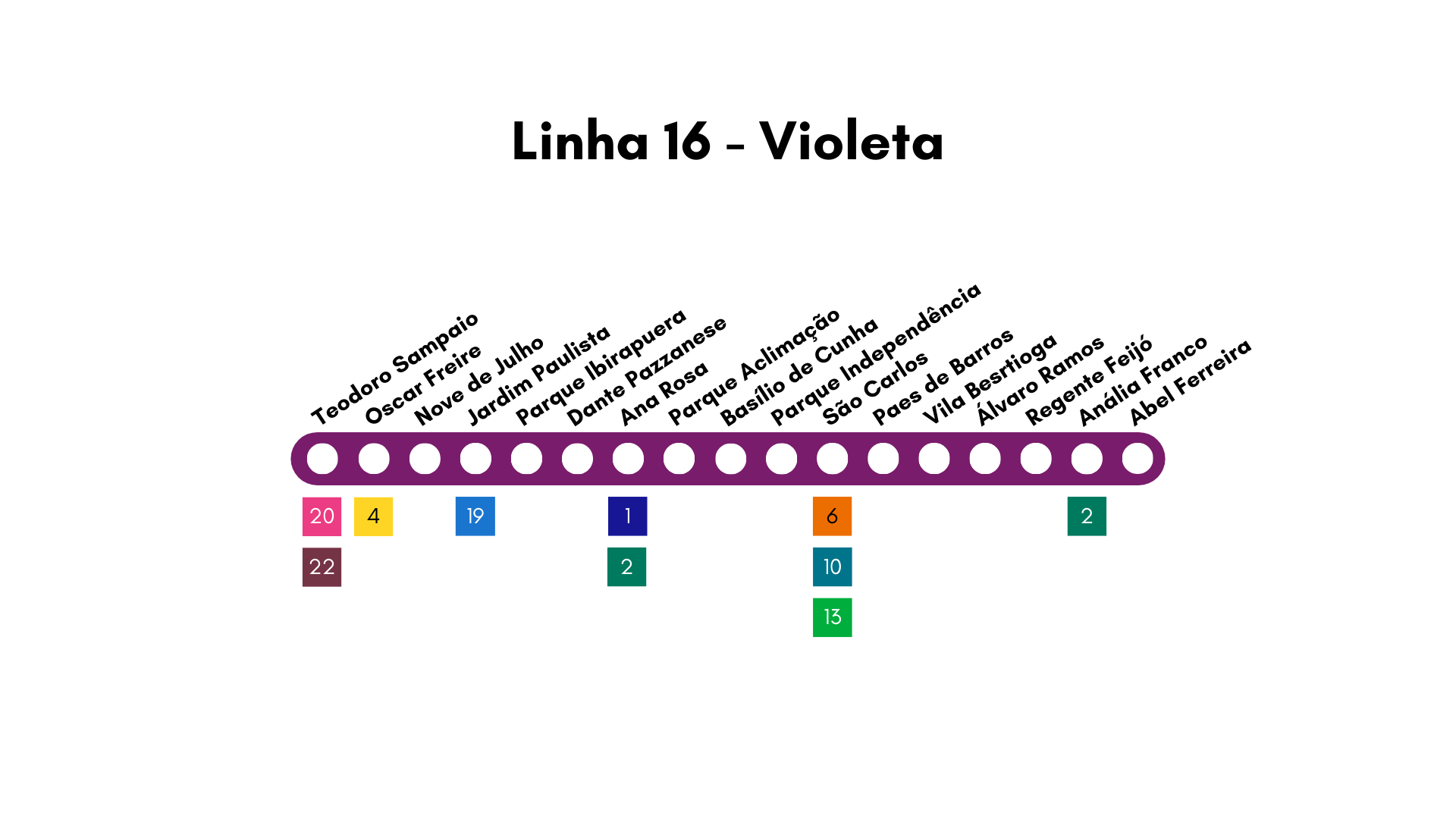

Overview
- Status: Proposed
- Owner: Government of the State of São Paulo
- Locale: São Paulo, Brazil
- Termini: Cardeal Arcoverde; Cidade Tiradentes
- Connecting lines: 20
- Stations: 25

Service
- Type: Rapid transit
- System: São Paulo Metro
- Operator(s): CMSP
- Depot(s): Henry Ford rail yard

History
- Planned opening: 2034 (estimated)

Technical
- Line length: 32 km (20 mi)
- Character: Underground
- Track gauge: 1,435 mm (4 ft 8 1/2 in) standard gauge
- Minimum radius: 300 m (980 ft)
- Electrification: 750 V DC third rail
- Operating speed: 80 km/h (50 mph)
- Signalling: CBTC

Line 16 (Violet) (Portuguese: Linha 16–Violeta) is a future project of the São Paulo Metro.

This new line will be approximately 32 kilometres (20 mi) long and have 25 stations, beginning at the Oscar Freire station (with connection with Line 4-Yellow) and ending at the future Cidade Tiradentes station (with connection with Line 15-Silver).

It will connect with Lines 1-Blue, 2-Green, 4-Yellow, 10-Turquoise, 14-Onyx and 15-Silver.

== Stations ==
Code	Station	Integration
TBA	Cardeal Arcoverde	20
TBA	Oscar Freire	Line 4 (São Paulo Metro)
TBA	Nove de Julho	-
TBA	Jardim Paulista	-
TBA	Parque Ibirapuera	-
TBA	Dante Pazzanese	-
TBA	Ana Rosa	Ana Rosa Bus Terminal
TBA	Parque Aclimação	-
TBA	Parque Independência	-
TBA	São Carlos	Expresso Tiradentes
TBA	Paes de Barros	-
TBA	Vila Bertioga	-
TBA	Álvaro Ramos	-
TBA	Regente Feijó	-
TBA	Anália Franco	Line 2 (São Paulo Metro)
TBA	Abel Ferreira	-
TBA	Renata	-
TBA	Cipriano Rodrigues	-
TBA	Vila Antonieta	-
TBA	Rio das Pedras	-
TBA	Jardim Brasília	-
TBA	Santa Marcelina	Companhia Paulista de Trens Metropolitanos Line 14 (CPTM)
TBA	Colônia	-
TBA	Fazenda do Carmo	-
TBA	Cidade Tiradentes	Cidade Tiradentes Bus Terminal
