= Consolação (district of São Paulo) =

District of São Paulo, Brazil

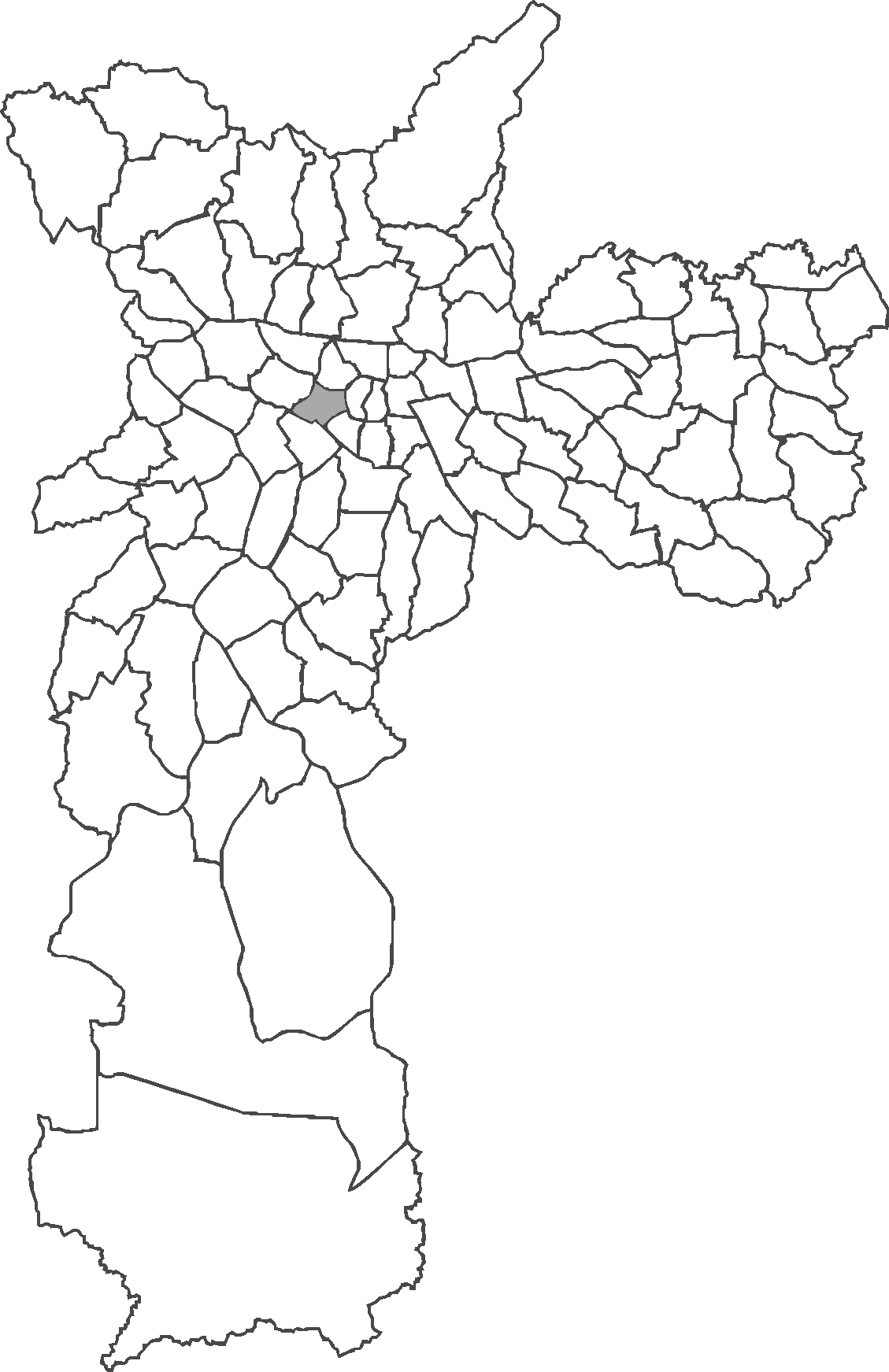
- District within the city of São Paulo

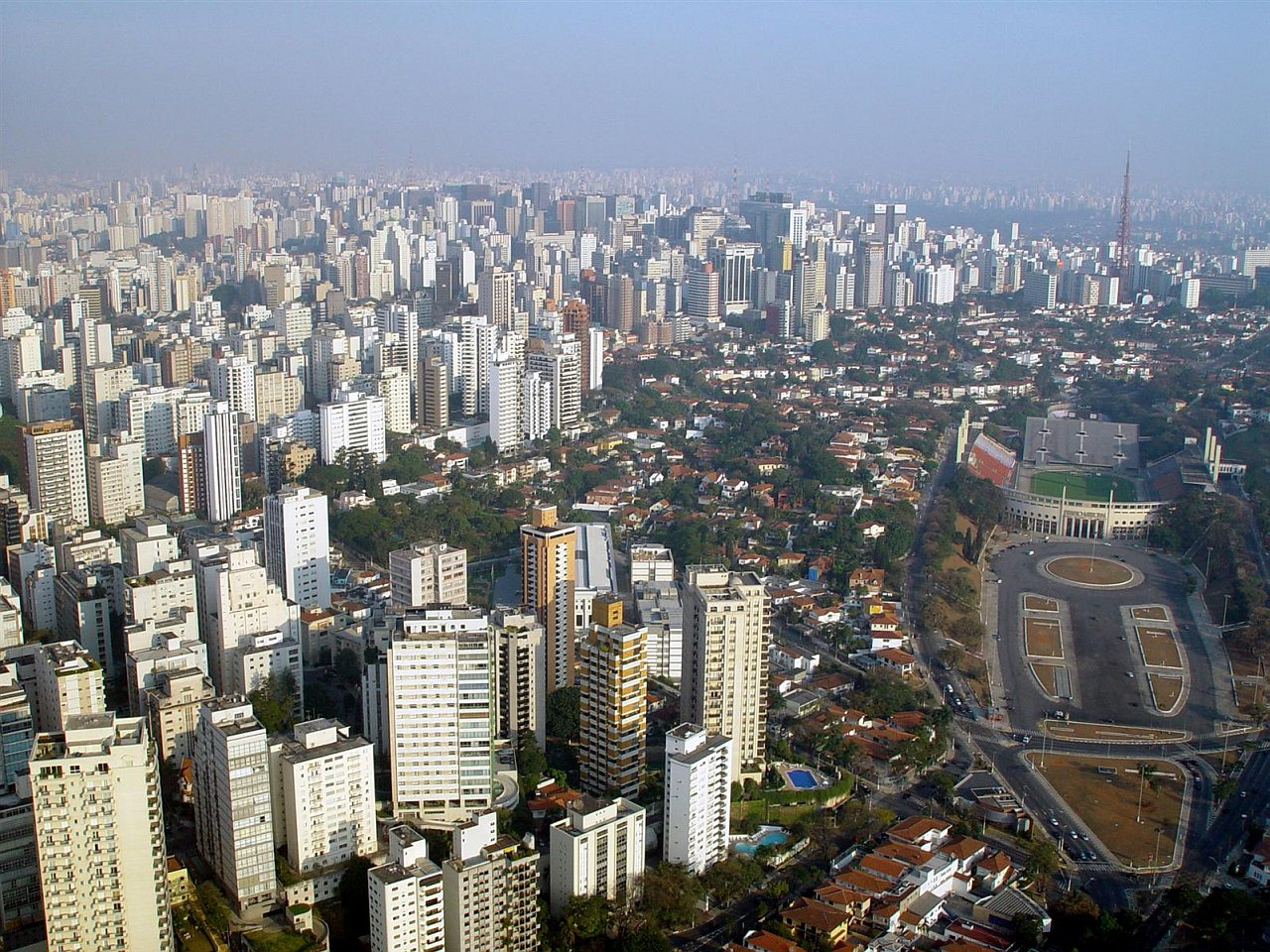
- Coordinates: 23°32′58″S 46°39′36″W
- Country: Brazil
- State: São Paulo
- District: Consolação (district of São Paulo)

Government
  - Type: Subprefecture
  - Subprefect: Amauri Luiz Pastorello

Area
  - Total: 3.7 km^{2} (1.4 sq mi)

Population (2007)
  - Total: 57,365
  - Density: 15,504/km^{2} (40,160/sq mi)
- HDI: 0.950 – high
- Website: Subprefecture of Sé

Consolação (Portuguese pronunciation: [kõsolaˈsɐ̃w]) is a district in the Central Zone of the city of São Paulo, Brazil. It belongs to the subprefecture of Sé. The district is largely residential, and contains many large apartment buildings and condominiums. It is also known for its prominent cultural institutions. The region has been populated since the 16th century, and is known for its buildings in the style of São Paulo Modern Architecture.

== History ==
Originally, the region of the city which comprises today's Consolação was inhabited by the Jesuits and was called Sesmaria do Pacaembu. It remained thus until the beginning of the 20th century, when it was converted into a residential neighbourhood for São Paulo's upper class. It was attractive due to its high elevation, wide open streets and an array of woody plants. Also, being far from the Luz train station and out of the old city center, it was much quieter and cleaner, giving it the name Higienópolis, 'City of Hygiene', also the name of an avenue in the district.

== Consolação today ==
=== The region ===
Today the district is still well known for the large upper class that lives in the area. Higienópolis contains numerous large apartment buildings, and very few, if any, houses with permanent residency.

There is currently a large number of Jewish and Jewish descendants living in the region, and there are a number of synagogues and Jewish schools throughout Consolação.

== Gallery ==
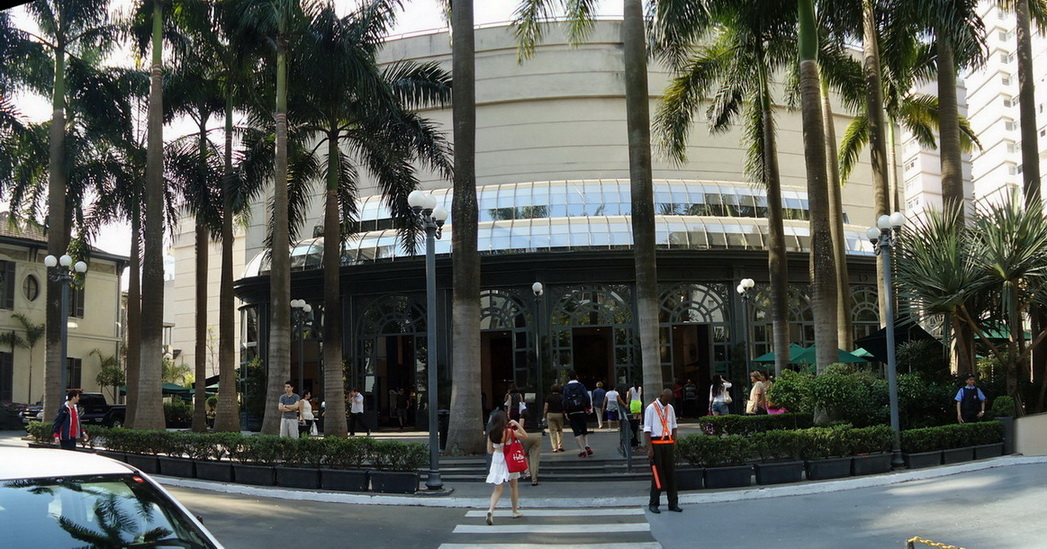
Higienópolis mall

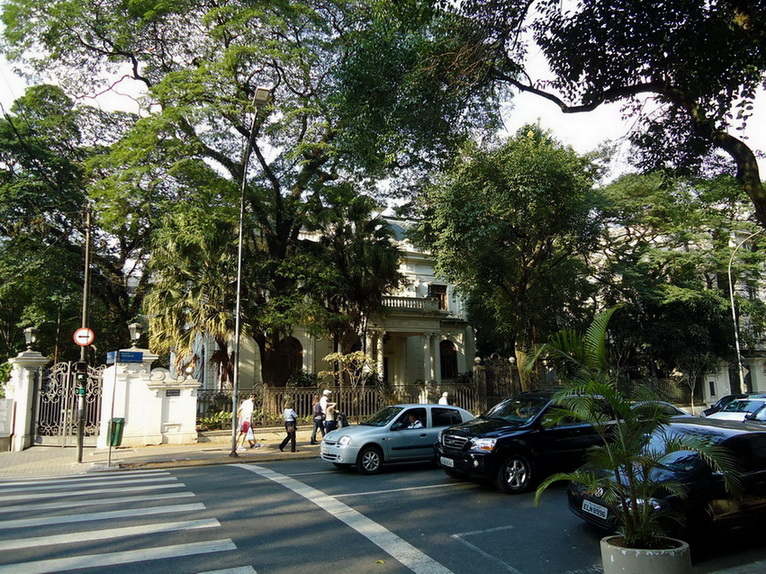
Streets of Higienópolis

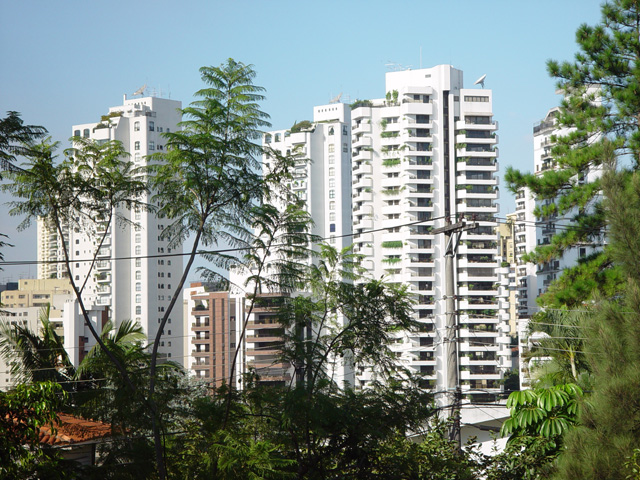
Residential buildings

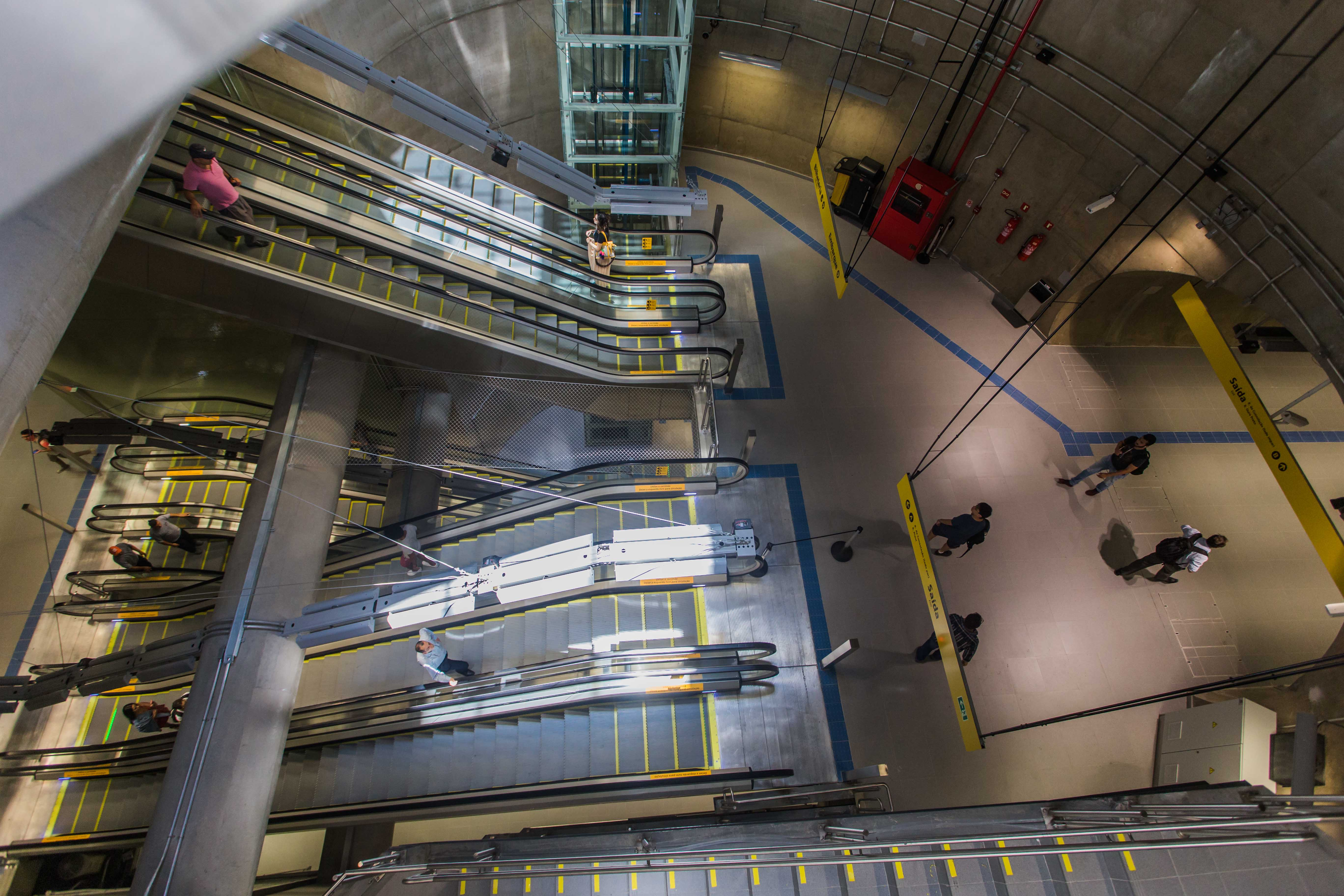
Metro Station

=== Attractions and events ===
The area features an array of tourist locations, local cuisine, hotels, art cinemas, many bars and nightclubs, shopping centers (Center3, Shopping Frei Caneca and Pátio Higienópolis) and the Municipal Stadium (Pacaembu Stadium) as well as being near to Paulista Avenue.

Buenos Aires Park is a small region of the neighborhood with a large variety of tropical plants and trees.

=== Culture and education ===
Consolação, being in the central area of the São Paulo Metropolis, is home to numerous cultural institutions. These include Fundação Armando Alvares Penteado (FAAP), Mackenzie Presbyterian University, the São Paulo Foundation School of Sociology and Politics, Cultura Inglesa (an English language and culture school), the French Alliance, and the Central University of Maria Antonia. The Roman Catholic Colégio Sion is located on Higienópolis Avenue, right across from the Colégio Rio Branco.

=== Transportation ===
The main Street of the district is called Rua da Consolação, which connects São Paulo's downtown to Rebouças, Paulista and Doutor Arnaldo Avenues, and has a bus corridor serving mainly North and Southbound buses across São Paulo. The district is served by 3 subway stations, Consolação (São Paulo Metro), Paulista (São Paulo Metro) and Higienópolis-Mackenzie (São Paulo Metro) and 1 future station: Angélica-Pacaembu (São Paulo Metro).
