= Line 20 (São Paulo Metro) =

Planned metro line

São Paulo Metro Line 20 (Pink)

Overview
- Status: Proposed
- Owner: Government of the State of São Paulo
- Locale: São Paulo; São Bernardo do Campo; Santo André
- Termini: Santa Marina; Santo André
- Connecting lines: 16
- Stations: 24 proposed

Service
- Type: Rapid transit
- System: São Paulo Metro
- Operator(s): CMSP
- Depot(s): Santa Marina rail yard Rhodia rail yard
- Rolling stock: 50 trains
- Daily ridership: >1,000,000 (estimated)

History
- Planned opening: 2039 (estimated)

Technical
- Line length: 33 km (21 mi) (estimated)
- Character: Underground
- Track gauge: 1,435 mm (4 ft 8 1/2 in) standard gauge
- Electrification: 1,5 kV DC catenary

Line 20 (Pink) (Portuguese: Linha 20–Rosa) is a planned line of São Paulo Metro.

At 31 kilometres (19 mi) in length, the line will serve as the first line of the future Subway Ring (Portuguese: Metroanel), which will include Line 5-Lilac (Moema ↔ Chácara Klabin stretch), the extension of Line 2-Green to station Dutra, and future Line 23-Lime (Cohab Raposo ↔ Tatuapé).

== Stations ==
Code	Station	Platforms	Position	Connections	Municipality
TBA	Santa Marina	Side platforms	Underground	(Future)	São Paulo
TBA	Lapa	Side platforms	Underground	Line 7 (CPTM) ViaMobilidade Line 8 (CPTM)	São Paulo
TBA	Vila Romana	Side platforms	Underground	–	São Paulo
TBA	Cerro Corá	Side platforms	Underground	(Planned)	São Paulo
TBA	Girassol	Side platforms	Underground	–	São Paulo
TBA	Cardeal Arcoverde	Side platforms	Underground	16 (Planned)	São Paulo
TBA	Fradique Coutinho	Side platforms	Underground	Line 4 (São Paulo Metro)	São Paulo
TBA	Tabapuã	Side platforms	Underground	–	São Paulo
TBA	JK	Side platforms	Underground	–	São Paulo
TBA	Vila Nova Conceição	Side platforms	Underground	19 (Planned)	São Paulo
TBA	Moema	Side platforms	Underground	Line 5 (São Paulo Metro)	São Paulo
TBA	Rubem Berta	Side platforms	Underground	–	São Paulo
TBA	Indianópolis	Side platforms	Underground	–	São Paulo
TBA	Saúde	Side platforms	Underground	Line 1 (São Paulo Metro)	São Paulo
TBA	Abraão de Morais	Side platforms	Underground	–	São Paulo
TBA	Cursino	Side platforms	Underground	–	São Paulo
TBA	Jardim Clímax	Side platforms	Underground	–	São Paulo
TBA	Liviero	Side platforms	Underground	–	São Paulo
TBA	Taboão–Paulicéia	Side platforms	Underground	–	São Bernardo do Campo
TBA	Rudge Ramos	Side platforms	Underground	–	São Bernardo do Campo
TBA	Afonsina	Side platforms	Underground	BRT ABC (Future)	São Bernardo do Campo
TBA	Príncipe de Gales	Side platforms	Underground	–	Santo André
TBA	Portugal	Side platforms	Underground	–	Santo André
TBA	Prefeito Celso Daniel–Santo André	Side platforms	Underground	Touristic Express; East Santo André Metropolitan Terminal; West Santo André Metropolitan Terminal; São Mateus–Jabaquara Metropolitan Corridor	Santo André
