= Luz (São Paulo Metro) =

São Paulo Metro station

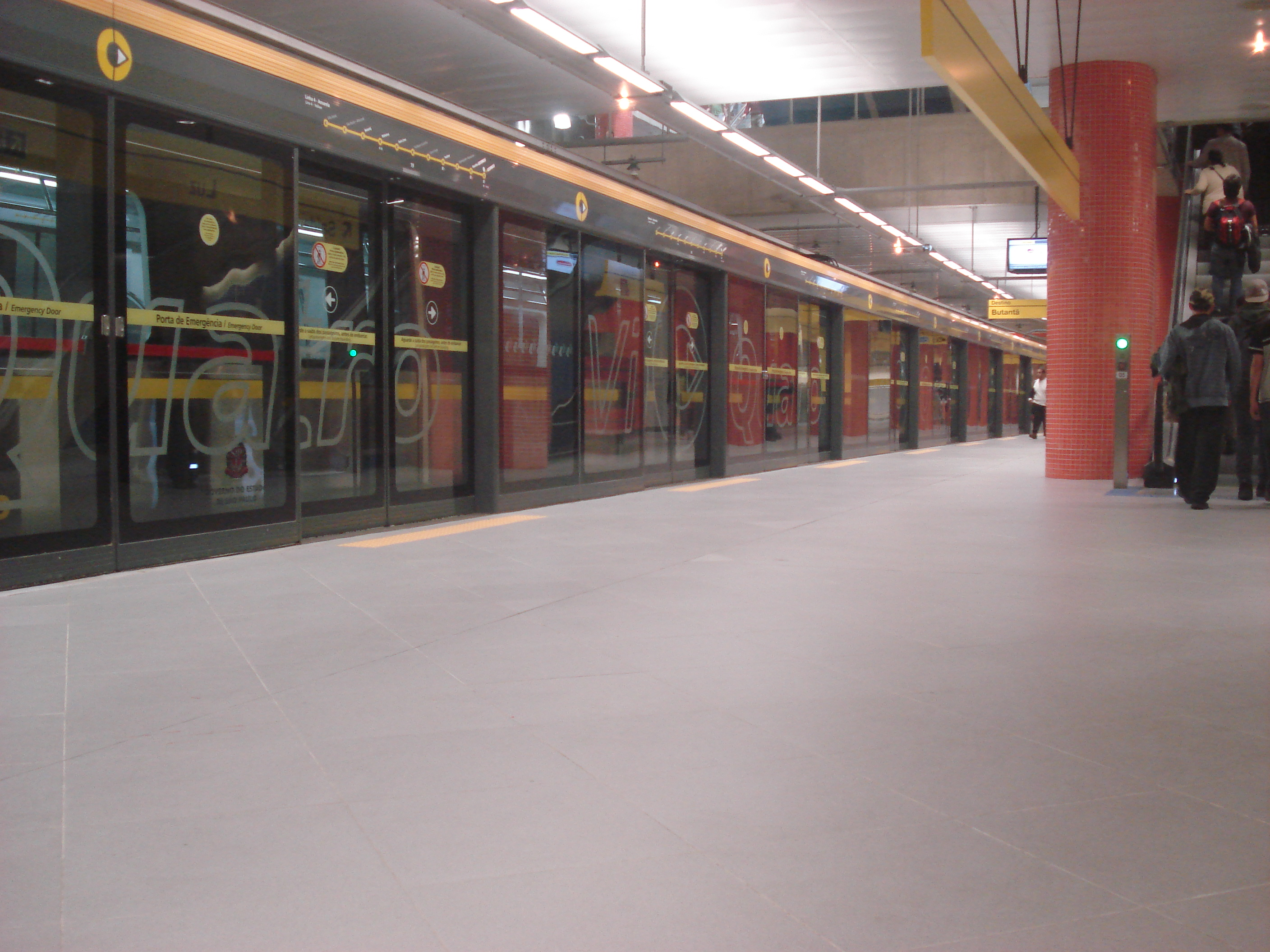
- Platform of Line 4

General information
- Location: Rua Prestes Maia, 925, Sé; São Paulo; Brazil
- Coordinates: 23°32′10″S 46°38′05″W
- Owner: Government of the State of São Paulo
- Operator: Companhia do Metropolitano de São Paulo; Motiva Linha 4
- Platforms: Island and side platform Side platforms
- Connections: (Note: Line 13 is attended in the station by the hourly Airport-Express service (5AM - 12AM).)

Construction
- Structure type: Underground
- Accessible: y

Other information
- Station code: LUZ

History
- Opened: 26 September 1975; 15 September 2011

Passengers
- 127,000/business day 113,850/business day

Services
| Preceding station | São Paulo Metro | Following station |
|---|---|---|
| Tiradentes towards Tucuruvi | Line 1 | São Bento towards Jabaquara |
| República towards Vila Sônia-Professora Elisabeth Tenreiro | Line 4 | Terminus |
Out-of-system interchange
| Preceding station | São Paulo Metropolitan Trains | Following station |
|---|---|---|
| Palmeiras-Barra Funda towards Jundiaí | Line 7 | Terminus |
| Palmeiras-Barra Funda towards Jundiaí | Service 710 (closed 27 August 2025) | Brás towards Rio Grande da Serra |
| Terminus | Line 10 | Brás towards Rio Grande da Serra |
| Palmeiras-Barra Funda Terminus | Line 11 | Brás towards Estudantes |
| Terminus | Line 13 | Guarulhos-CECAP towards Aeroporto–Guarulhos |
Transfer at: Luz (CPTM)
Track layout
Line 1 track layout
Line 4 track layout
Location

Luz is a metro station located between República and Sé districts, in the central region of São Paulo. This station connects the lines 1-Blue, operated by Companhia do Metropolitano de São Paulo, and 4-Yellow, operated by Motiva Linha 4. It is also connected with the CPTM station of the same name, with connections to lines 10-Turquoise and 11-Coral with no additional cost, and to Line 13-Jade (Airport Express).

== Line 1-Blue ==
=== Characteristics ===
The station of Line 1-Blue was opened on 26 September 1975. It's an underground station with a flow distribution mezzanine and island and side platforms with structure in apparent concrete. It has a 18,250 square metres (196,400 sq ft) constructed area and capacity for 40,000 passengers per hour in peak hours.

The free connection with the CPTM station started on 30 November 2004, by an initiative of the State Secretariat of Metropolitan Transports.

== Line 4-Yellow ==
=== Characteristics ===
The station of Line 4-Yellow was originally scheduled to be opened in 2008, but was opened only on 15 September 2011 and started operating from 10a.m. to 3p.m. On 23 September, the time was increased to 9a.m. to 4 p.m. and, since 26 September, from 4:40 a.m. to midnight.

It's an underground station with side platforms. It has a 20,594.84 square metres (221,681.0 sq ft) of constructed area, with five levels and 36 metres (118 ft) of depth. A skylight in the roof of the station allows the entrance of solar light.
