= Vila Sônia-Professora Elisabeth Tenreiro (São Paulo Metro) =

São Paulo Metro station

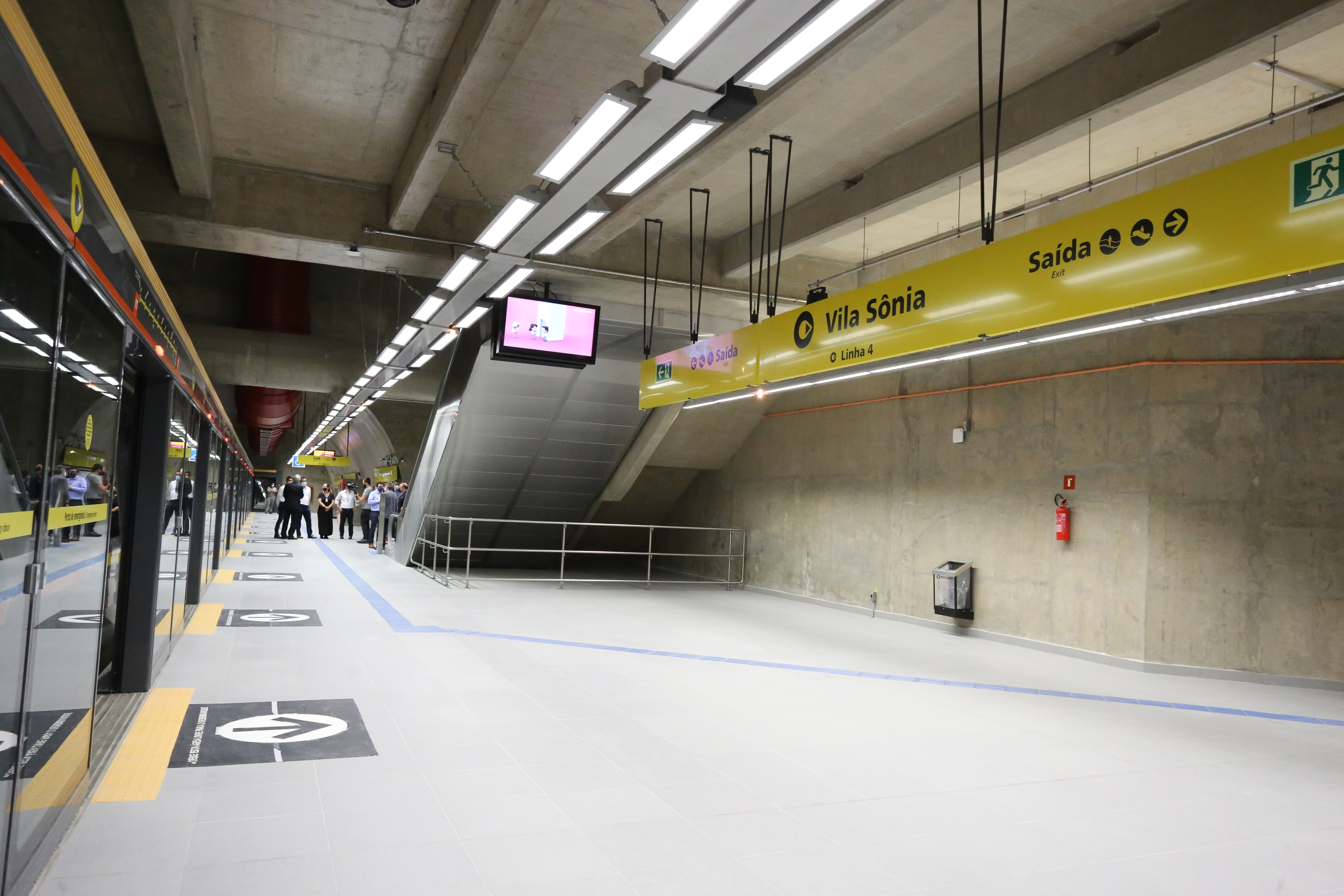

General information
- Location: Av. Professor Francisco Morato × Rua Heitor dos Prazeres, Vila Sônia; São Paulo; Brazil
- Coordinates: 23.591667°S 46.735277°W
- Owner: Government of the State of São Paulo
- Operator: Motiva Linha 4
- Platforms: Side platforms
- Connections: Vila Sônia Bus Terminal; Campo Limpo–Rebouças–Centro Bus Corridor; Vila Sônia–Taboão da Serra free shuttle bus

Construction
- Structure type: Underground
- Accessible: y

Other information
- Station code: VSO

History
- Opened: 17 December 2021
- Former names: Vila Sônia

Services
| Preceding station | São Paulo Metro | Following station |
|---|---|---|
| Terminus | Line 4 | São Paulo-Morumbi towards Luz |
Track layout
Location

Vila Sônia-Professora Elisabeth Tenreiro is a station of São Paulo Metro. It belongs to Line 4-Yellow, operated by Motiva Linha 4, and has this station as a terminus. It is located in the crossing of Avenida Professor Francisco Morato and Rua Heitor dos Prazeres.

It was opened on 17 December 2021. The station was renamed on 15 April 2023 to Vila Sônia-Professora Elisabeth Tenreiro as a tribute to a teacher who worked at a nearby state middle school and was killed in an attack by a student.

== History ==
In 1995, São Paulo Metro hired the company Figueiredo Ferraz Consultoria e Engenharia de Projeto S.A. to make a functional project of Line 4-Yellow (as the previous one was made in 1980). Unlike the previous project, which planned a depot in the Ferreira district, the project presented in 1997 by Figueiredo Ferraz suggested the construction of the rail yard and depot in a large area located in the block surrounded by avenues Professor Francisco Morato, Imigrante Japonês and Eliseu de Almeida and Rua Heitor dos Prazeiros, in the district of Vila Sônia.

Line 4-Yellow was planned to be contracted in 1999, but the Four Asian Tigers crisis resulted in a lack of funds from the development banks which were to finance the construction, and project was paralyzed until the beginning of the 2000s. After being resumed, in 2003, it went through many changes, such as a reduction in the number of stations, but Vila Sônia rail yard was kept from the original project.

The cancelling, due to pressure of local residents, of Três Poderes station made São Paulo Metro to suggest a future expansion of Line 4 to Taboão da Serra and include, for the first time, Vila Sônia station, located next to the rail yard. Construction of the line began in March 2004, but 3 phases were conceived. In Phase 1, only part of the yard had its construction started and concluded in 2010. In Phase 2, the rest of the yard and the station had its construction started. The future Phase 3 expect to attend the city of Taboão da Serra (by bus or expansion of the subway line).

== Characteristics ==
Buried station with side platforms, structure in apparent concrete and distribution catwalk in metallic structure, fixed with braces over the platform. It has access for people with disabilities.

== Station layout ==
| G | Street level | Exit/entrance |
| M1 | Concourse level 1 | Fare control, ticket office, customer service, Bilhete Único/TOP recharge machines |
| M2 | Concourse level 2 | Distribution concourse |
P Platform level
| P Platform level | Side platform, doors open on the left |
| P Platform level | Northbound | toward Luz → |
| P Platform level | Northbound | toward Luz → |
| P Platform level | Side platform, doors open on the right |

== Vila Sônia rail yard and Control Center ==
Projected in 1997 by architect João Toscano, in partnership with architects Massayoshi Kamimura, Monique Alonso Gonzalez and Odiléa Helena Setti Toscano, the construction of Vila Sônia rail yard began in March 2004 and divided in two phases. Phase 1 was opened in 2010, and Phase 2 is estimated to be concluded in mid-2020.
