= Motiva Linha 4 =

Brazilian transport company, operating line 4 of the São Paulo Metro

Overview
- Main region: Greater São Paulo
- Fleet: 174 Hyundai Rotem 400 Series (29 trains)
- Stations called at: 11
- Parent company: Motiva
- Headquarters: São Paulo
- Key people: Antonio Barros Silva (COO)
- Dates of operation: 2010–present

Technical
- Track gauge: 1,435 mm (4 ft 8 1/2 in)
- Electrification: Overhead line, 1,500 V DC
- Length: 12.8 km (8.0 mi)
- Operating speed: 80 km/h (50 mph)

Other
- Website: trilhos.motiva.com.br/linha-4-amarela/

Motiva Linha 4, formerly known as ViaQuatro, is a company belonging to Motiva, being responsible for the operation, maintenance and investments of more than US$2 billion in the São Paulo Metro Line 4 for 30 years, through the first public-private concession contract of the country, in partnership with the Government of the State of São Paulo.

In the public-private concession contract signed, it is up to São Paulo Metro to install the civil infrastructure of the Line (stations construction, substations, rail yard and maintenance, tunnels, etc.), being the dealership responsible for the operation and maintenance of the line and acquisition of the rolling material, signaling systems, telecommunications and CCO (Operational Control Center).

== Motiva Linha 4 fleet ==
Line 4-Yellow has a fleet of 174 vehicles:

Line	Year	Manufacturer	Country of Origin	Trains	Numeration of Fleet / Vehicles
4	2008/2010	Rotem	South Korea	29	401 to 429

== Free shuttle bus ==
In addition to Line 4 itself, Motiva also operates a free shuttle bus between Line 4's terminus of Vila Sônia-Professora Elisabeth Tenreiro station and Taboão da Serra. Thus bus opened on 10 September 2022.

== See also ==
- Line 4 (São Paulo Metro)
