= Camilo Haddad (São Paulo Metro) =

São Paulo Metro station

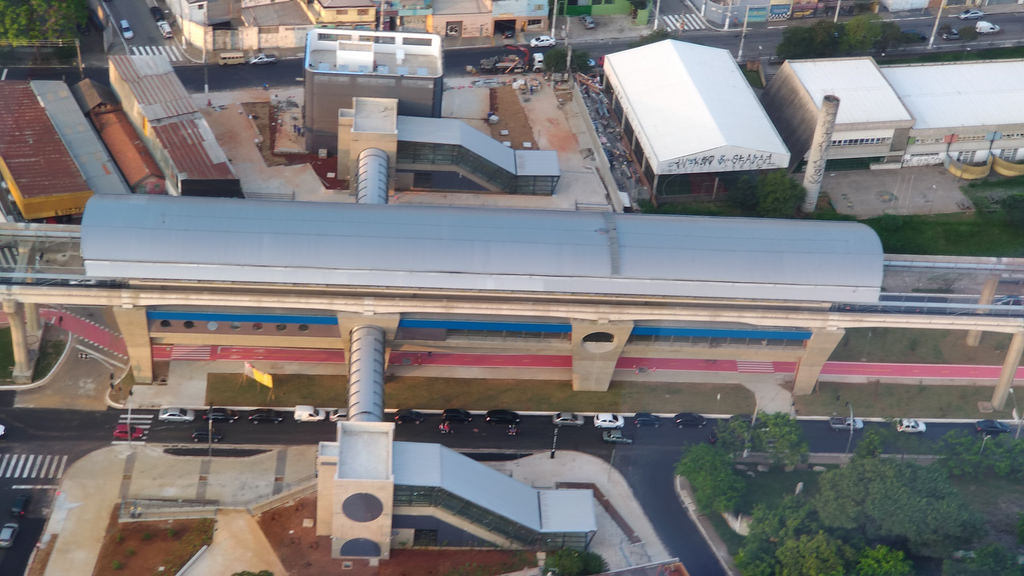
- Station Camilo Haddad of Line 15-Silver of São Paulo Metro under construction. April 2018.

General information
- Location: Av. Prof. Luis Inácio de Anhaia Mello, 6494, São Lucas; São Paulo; Brazil
- Coordinates: 23°35′43″S 46°32′16″W
- Owner: Government of the State of São Paulo
- Operator: Companhia do Metropolitano de São Paulo
- Platforms: Island platforms

Construction
- Structure type: Elevated
- Accessible: Y

Other information
- Station code: CAD

History
- Opened: April 6, 2018

Passengers
- 4,000/business day

Services
Preceding station	São Paulo Metro	Following station
São Lucas towards Vila Prudente	Line 15	Vila Tolstói towards Jacu-Pêssego
Track layout
Location

Camilo Haddad is a monorail station of São Paulo Metro. Belongs to Line 15-Silver, which is actually in expansion, and should go to Cidade Tiradentes, with connection with Line 2-Green in Vila Prudente. It is placed in Av. Prof. Luis Inácio de Anhaia Mello, next to Rua Camilo Haddad. Because of the small demand (about 5,000 passengers per day), this station would be named by the press as mini-station.

It was opened by the Government of the State of São Paulo on April 6, 2018.

== Toponymy ==
The station received the name of Camilo Haddad because of the homonym street, localized across to the station. Camilo Haddad was born on August 10, 1904, in Syria, and his family later migrated to Brazil. After being naturalized as Brazilian, graduated in Medicine in University of Brazil. During decades, kept his clinic in Vila Prudente, attending the community until 1974, when he died. On January 9, 1978, mayor Olavo Setúbal signed Executive Order no. 14,883, which officialized the naming of dozens of public streets, and in its subsection XXIX named "Doutor Camilo Haddad" the old B and 3 streets.

== Station layout ==
P Platform level
P Platform level	Westbound	← toward Vila Prudente
P Platform level	Island platform, doors open on the left
P Platform level	Eastbound	toward São Mateus →
M	Mezzanine	Fare control, ticket office, customer service, Bilhete Único/BOM recharge machines
G	Street level	Exit/entrance
