= Fazenda da Juta (São Paulo Metro) =

São Paulo Metro station

Coordinates: 23.6118°S 46.4875°W

Fazenda da Juta/Jardim Sapopemba
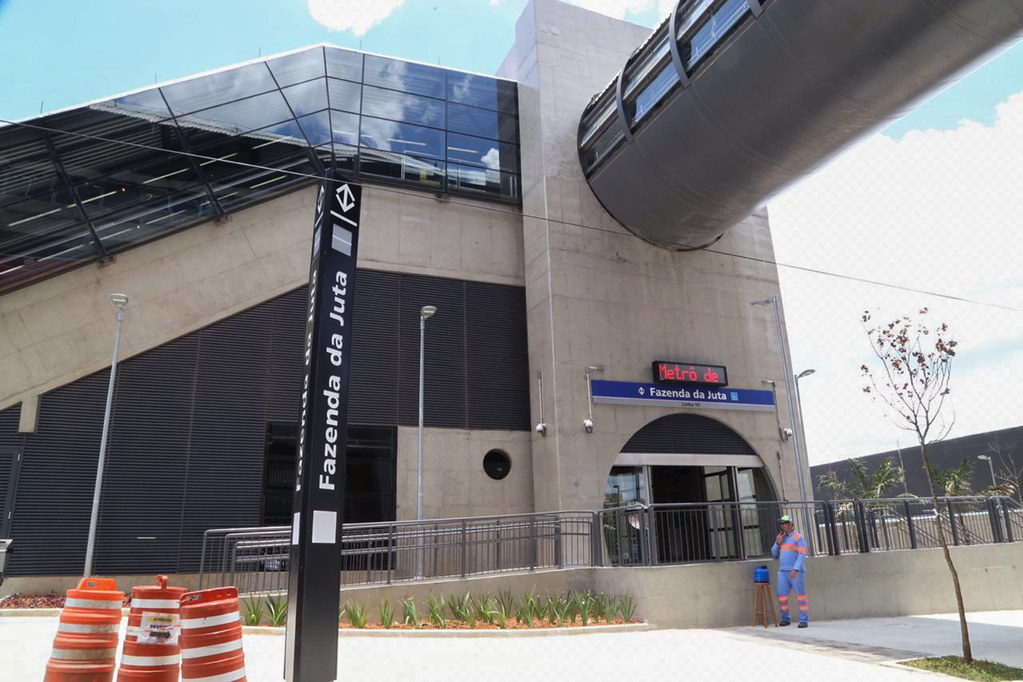

General information
- Location: Av. Sapopemba, 12580, Sapopemba; São Paulo; Brazil
- Owner: Government of the State of São Paulo
- Operator: Companhia do Metropolitano de São Paulo
- Platforms: Island platforms

Construction
- Structure type: Elevated
- Accessible: y

Other information
- Station code: FJT

History
- Opened: 16 December 2019

Passengers
- 5,000/business day

Services
Preceding station	São Paulo Metro	Following station
Sapopemba towards Vila Prudente	Line 15	São Mateus towards Jacu-Pêssego
Track layout
Location

Fazenda da Juta is a monorail of São Paulo Metro. It belongs to Line 15-Silver, which is currently in expansion, and should go to Cidade Tiradentes, connecting with Line 2-Green in Vila Prudente. It is located in Avenida Sapopemba, 12580.

It was initially scheduled to open in the first semester of 2020, according to the São Paulo Metro Expansion Plan. It was officially opened on December 16, 2019, along with stations Sapopemba and São Mateus.

== Station layout ==
P Platform level
P Platform level	Westbound	← toward Vila Prudente
P Platform level	Island platform, doors open on the left
P Platform level	Eastbound	toward Jardim Colonial →
M	Mezzanine	Fare control, ticket office, customer service, Bilhete Único/BOM recharge machines
G	Street level	Exit/entrance
