= Vila União (São Paulo Metro) =

São Paulo Metro station

Coordinates: 23°36′11″S 46°30′56″W

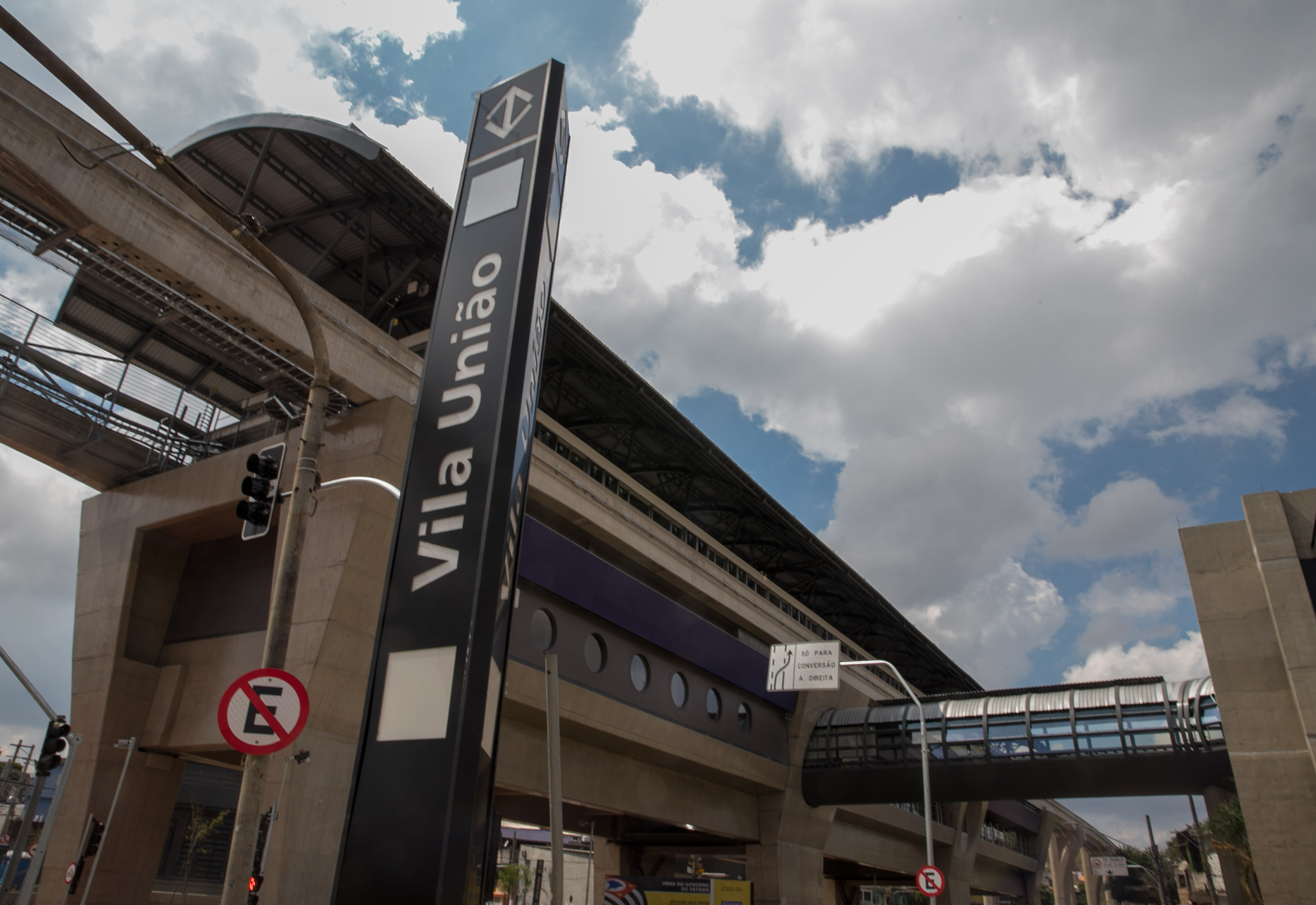
- Station Vila União of Line 15-Silver of São Paulo Metro

General information
- Location: Av. Prof. Luis Inácio de Anhaia Mello, 9048, Sapopemba; São Paulo; Brazil
- Owner: Government of the State of São Paulo
- Operator: Companhia do Metropolitano de São Paulo
- Platforms: Island platforms

Construction
- Structure type: Elevated
- Accessible: Y

Other information
- Station code: VUN

History
- Opened: April 6, 2018

Passengers
- 6,000/business day

Services
Preceding station	São Paulo Metro	Following station
Vila Tolstói towards Vila Prudente	Line 15	Jardim Planalto towards Jacu-Pêssego
Track layout
Location

Vila União is a monorail station of São Paulo Metro in Brazil. It belongs to Line 15-Silver, which is actually in expansion, and should go to Cidade Tiradentes, with connection with Line 2-Green in Vila Prudente. It is placed in Av. Prof. Luis Inácio de Anhaia Mello, next to Avenida Casa Grande.

It was opened by the Government of the State of São Paulo on April 6, 2018.

== Station layout ==
P Platform level
P Platform level	Westbound	← toward Vila Prudente
P Platform level	Island platform, doors open on the left
P Platform level	Eastbound	toward São Mateus →
M	Mezzanine	Fare control, ticket office, customer service, Bilhete Único/BOM recharge machines
G	Street level	Exit/entrance
