= São Lucas (São Paulo Metro) =

São Paulo Metro station

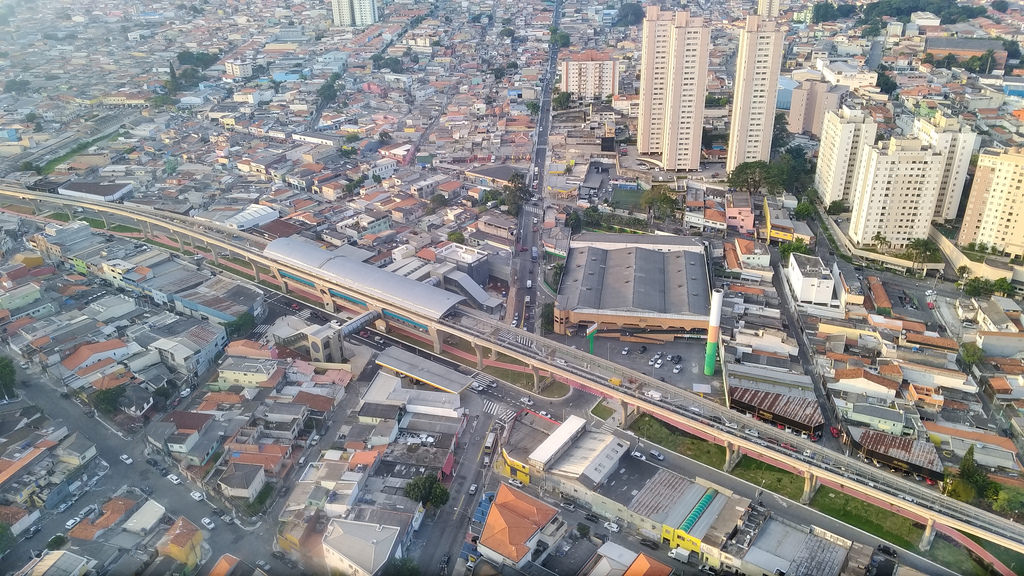
- Station São Lucas of Line 15-Silver of São Paulo Metro under construction. April 2018.

General information
- Location: Av. Prof. Luis Inácio de Anhaia Mello, 5400, São Lucas; São Paulo; Brazil
- Coordinates: 23°35′20″S 46°32′41″W
- Owner: Government of the State of São Paulo
- Operator: Companhia do Metropolitano de São Paulo
- Platforms: Island platforms

Construction
- Structure type: Elevated
- Accessible: Y

Other information
- Station code: SLU

History
- Opened: April 6, 2018

Passengers
- 5,000/business day

Services
Preceding station	São Paulo Metro	Following station
Oratório towards Vila Prudente	Line 15	Camilo Haddad towards Jacu-Pêssego
Track layout
Location

São Lucas is a monorail station of the São Paulo Metro. Belongs to Line 15–Silver, which is currently in expansion, and should reach the district of Cidade Tiradentes, with connection with Line 2–Green in Vila Prudente. It is placed in Av. Prof. Luis Inácio de Anhaia Mello, 5400.

Its construction started in 2015. It was opened on April 6, 2018 by the Government of the State of São Paulo.

== Location on the network ==
Built on an elevated platform, the São Lucas station, on the monorail line known as line 15 of the São Paulo Metro (silver), is located between the Oratório station, in the direction of the provisional western terminus Vila Prudente, and the Camilo Haddad station, in the direction of the provisional eastern terminus Jardim Colonial.

== Station layout ==
P Platform level
P Platform level	Westbound	← toward Vila Prudente
P Platform level	Island platform, doors open on the left
P Platform level	Eastbound	toward São Mateus →
M	Mezzanine	Fare control, ticket office, customer service, Bilhete Único/BOM recharge machines
G	Street level	Exit/entrance
