= Jardim Planalto (São Paulo Metro) =

São Paulo Metro station

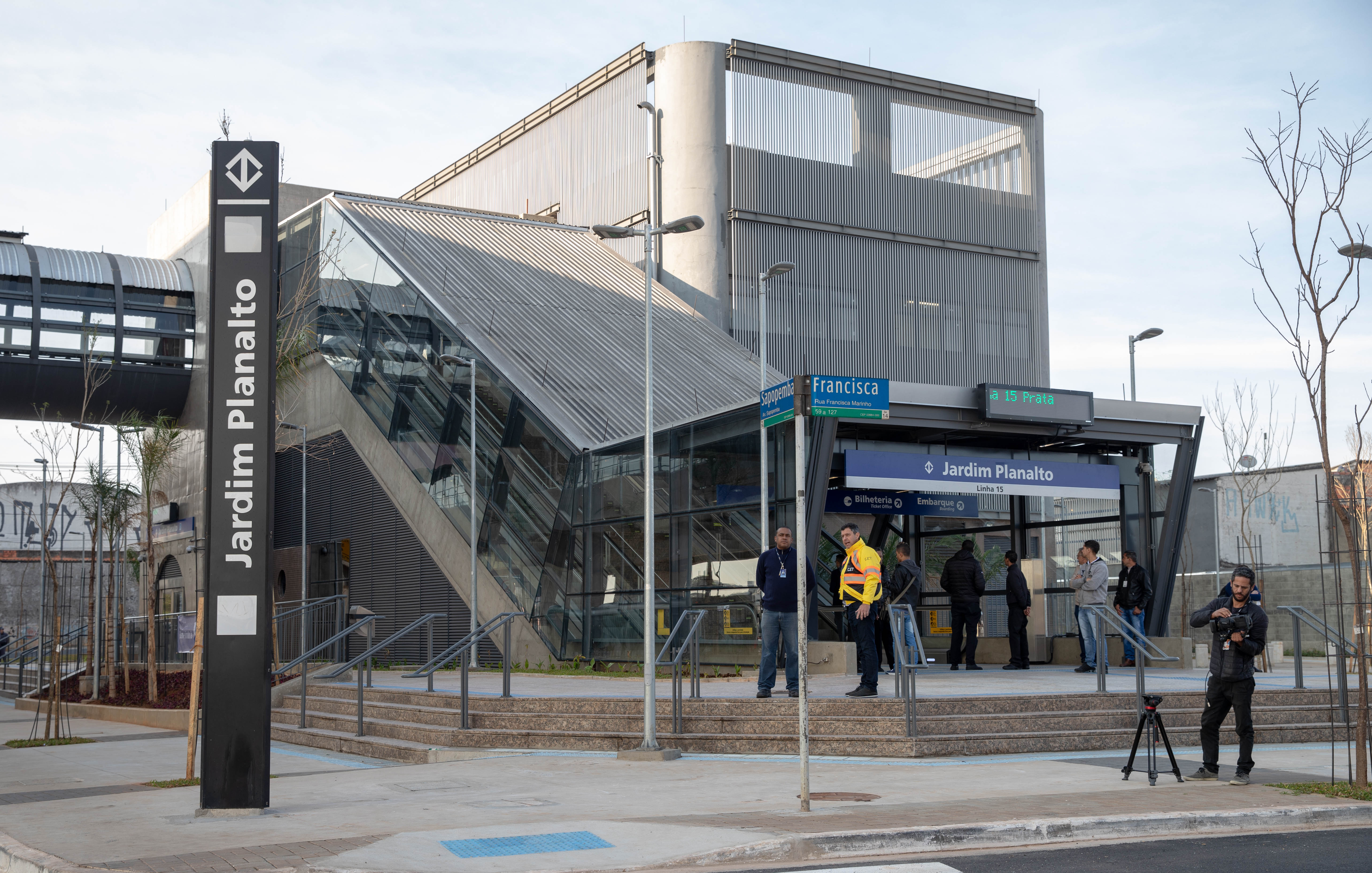
- Jardim Planalto station of Line 15-Silver of São Paulo Metro inauguration in 2019.

General information
- Location: Av. Sapopemba, 10000, Sapopemba; São Paulo; Brazil
- Coordinates: 23°36′26″S 46°30′26″W
- Owner: Government of the State of São Paulo
- Operator: Companhia do Metropolitano de São Paulo
- Platforms: Island platforms

Construction
- Structure type: Elevated
- Accessible: y

Other information
- Station code: JPL

History
- Opened: 26 August 2019

Passengers
- 4,000/business day

Services
Preceding station	São Paulo Metro	Following station
Vila União towards Vila Prudente	Line 15	Sapopemba towards Jacu-Pêssego
Track layout
Location

Jardim Planalto is a station of the São Paulo Metro. It belongs to Line 15-Silver, which is currently in expansion, and should go to Cidade Tiradentes, connecting with Line 2-Green in Vila Prudente. It is located in Avenida Sapopemba, 10000.

It was officially opened on 26 August 2019.

== Station layout ==
P Platform level
P Platform level	Westbound	← toward Vila Prudente
P Platform level	Island platform, doors open on the left
P Platform level	Eastbound	toward São Mateus →
M	Mezzanine	Fare control, ticket office, customer service, Bilhete Único/BOM recharge machines
G	Street level	Exit/entrance
