= Sapopemba =

Sapopemba may refer to:

- Subprefecture of Sapopemba, a subprefecture of the city of São Paulo, Brazil
- Sapopemba (district of São Paulo)
- Sapopemba (São Paulo Metro), a São Paulo Metro monorail station
