= São Paulo Metro M stock =

M stock
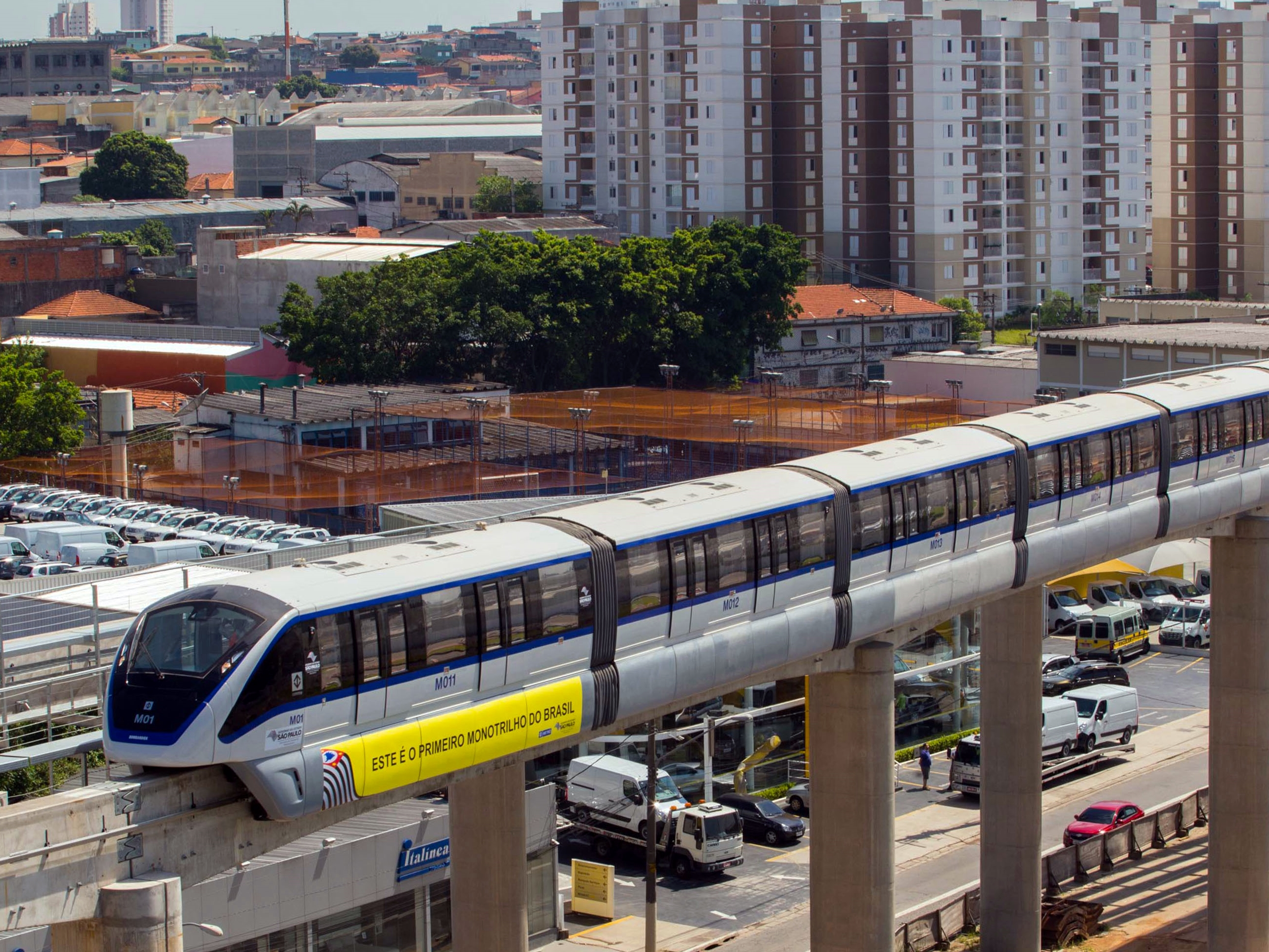
- An M01 train in a test trip

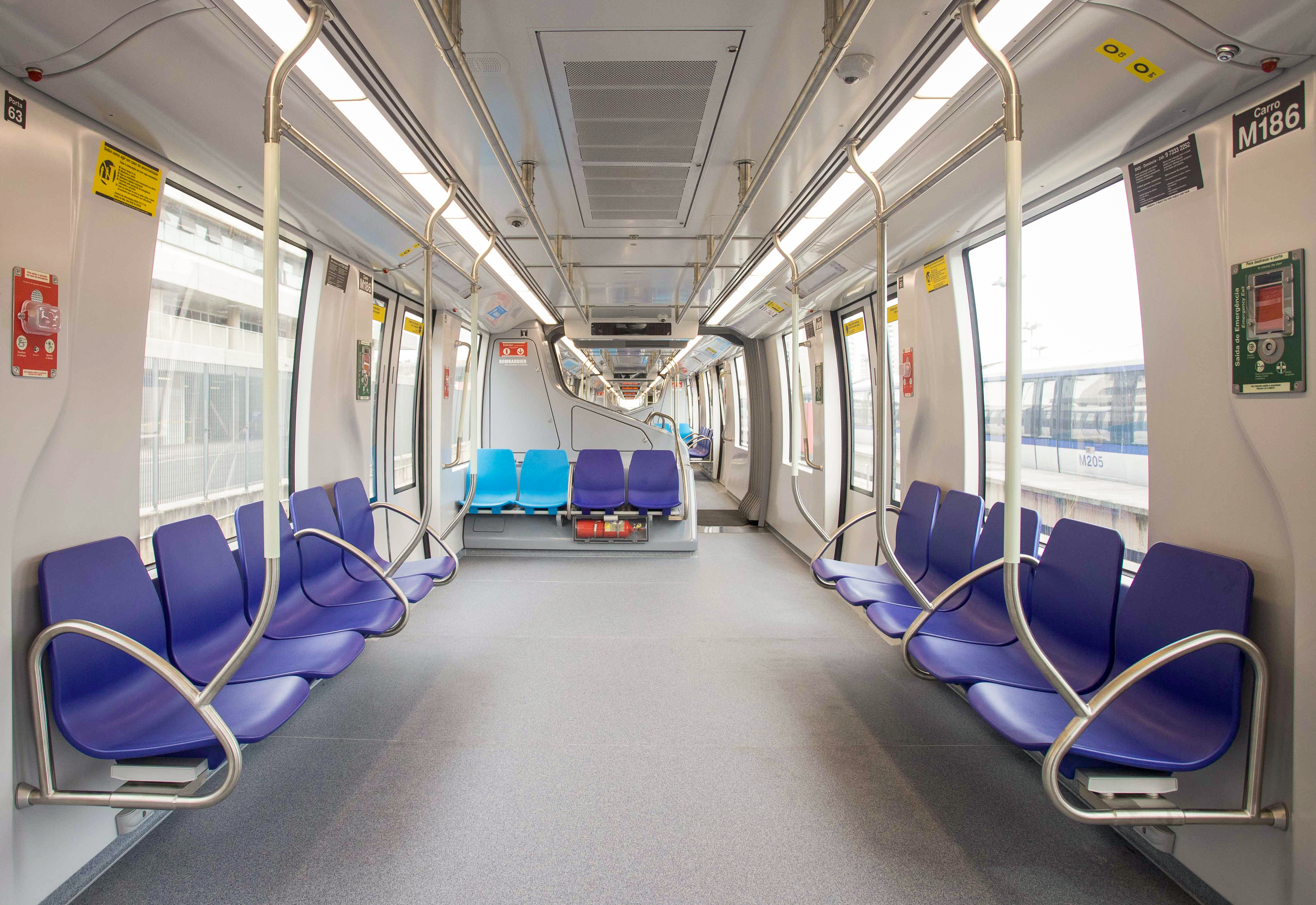
- In service: 2014–present
- Manufacturers: Bombardier Transportation; Alstom
- Built at: (Canada) Kingston, Ontario; (Brazil) Hortolândia, São Paulo
- Family name: INNOVIA Monorail 300
- Constructed: 2011–2014
- Entered service: 30 August 2014
- Number built: 189 carriages (27 sets)
- Number in service: 161 carriages (23 sets)
- Formation: 7-car sets (A–C–D–C–D–C–A)
- Fleet numbers: M01x–M27x
- Capacity: 1,002 (if 6 passengers/m²); 1,292 (if 8 passengers/m²)
- Operator: Companhia do Metropolitano de São Paulo
- Depot: Oratório Yard
- Line served: Line 15 (São Paulo Metro)

Specifications
- Car body construction: Aluminium
- Train length: 86,009 mm (3,386.2 in)
- Car length: 13,392 mm (43 ft 11.2 in) (A cars); 11,845 mm (38 ft 10.3 in) (C and D cars)
- Width: 3.15 m (10 ft 4 in)
- Height: 4.04 m (13 ft 3 in)
- Entry: Level
- Doors: 4 sets of side doors per car
- Maximum speed: 80 km/h (50 mph)
- Weight: 14,400 kg (31,700 lb)
- Traction motors: 14 × 96 kW (129 hp) permanent-magnet synchronous motor
- Power output: 1,344 kW (1,802 hp)
- Acceleration: 1.2 m/s^{2} (3.9 ft/s^{2})
- Deceleration: 1.3 m/s^{2} (4.3 ft/s^{2}) (service); 1.7 m/s^{2} (5.6 ft/s^{2}) (emergency)
- HVAC: Air conditioning
- Electric systems: 750 V DC contact rails on the side of the beam
- Current collection: Contact shoe
- AAR wheel arrangement: A-A+A-A+A-A+A-A+A-A+A-A+A-A
- Braking systems: Regenerative and Rheostatic (in stations); Hydraulic (friction)
- Safety system: Cityflo 650 CBTC
- Track gauge: 680 mm (2 ft 2 3/4 in)

The São Paulo Metro M stock is a class of trains built by Bombardier between 2011 and 2014 to operate on Line 15-Silver, opened in 2014. This is the first monorail class of trains of the state of São Paulo.

== Accidents and incidents ==
- On 14 October 2016, a train left Oratório station with its doors open, due to an error in a programming made by Bombardier in the composition's computers.
- On 29 January 2019, two trains in tests collided at the not yet opened Jardim Planalto station. According to a Metropolitan Company report, the accident was caused by human error.
- In January 2020, screws fell from one of the line's track switches, making it operate with reduced speed for 5 days.
- On 27 February 2020, a tire of M20 train exploded, interrupting the whole line. After Bombardier and Metro technicians studied and repaired the equipments, the branch was partially reopened on 2 June and fully reopened on 18 June. According to the secretary of Metropolitan Transports, Alexandre Baldy, one of the possible causes were imperfections on the concrete tracks, which caused excessive vibrations, making the tire runflat mechanism touch the rubber inside the wheel, causing premature damage and subsequent severance.
- On 8 March 2023, trains M14 and M15 collided between stations Sapopemba and Jardim Planalto at 4:30 a.m. (GMT-3), during the preparation for the beginning of operation. As the line was not opened, the trains had no passengers on board, but there were train operators, one of them who was slightly injured. On the following day, during the removal of the collided trains, they crashed again, this time leaving no one harmed. Both were later moved to the yard, with no other incidents.

== See also ==
- Line 15 (São Paulo Metro)
- São Paulo Metro
