= Sapopemba (São Paulo Metro) =

São Paulo Metro station

Coordinates: 23.6146°S 46.5009°W

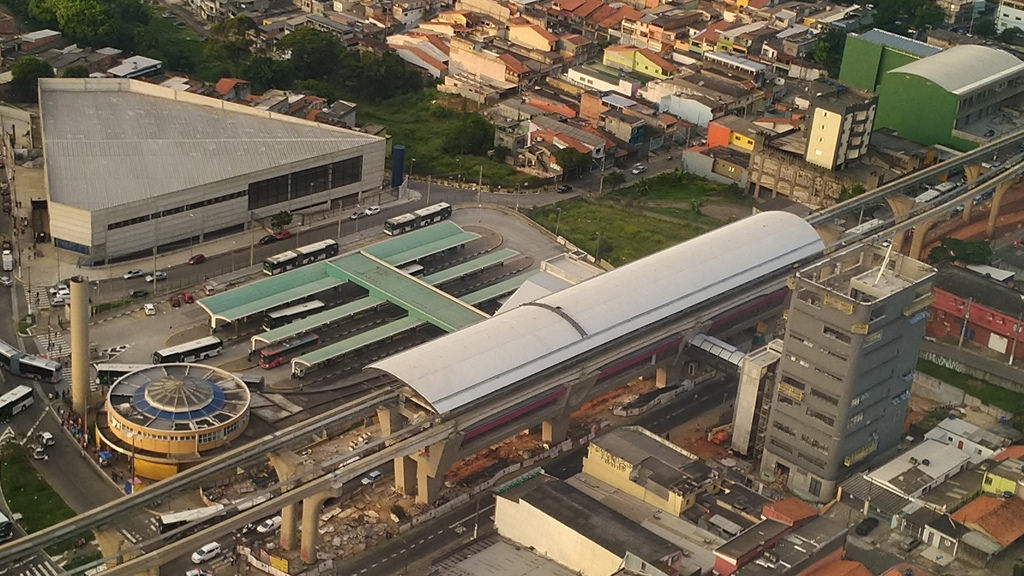
- Sapopemba station of Line 15-Silver of São Paulo Metro in construction. April 2018.

General information
- Location: Av. Sapopemba, 11268, Sapopemba; São Paulo; Brazil
- Owner: Government of the State of São Paulo
- Operator: Companhia do Metropolitano de São Paulo
- Platforms: Island platforms
- Connections: (planned); Sapopemba/Teotônio Vilela Bus Terminal

Construction
- Structure type: Elevated
- Accessible: y

Other information
- Station code: SAP

History
- Opened: 16 December 2019

Passengers
- 8,000/business day

Services
Preceding station	São Paulo Metro	Following station
Jardim Planalto towards Vila Prudente	Line 15	Fazenda da Juta towards Jacu-Pêssego
Future out-of-system interchange
Preceding station	São Paulo Metropolitan Trains	Following station
Jardim Itápolis towards Bonsucesso	Line 14 transfer at Sapopemba	Parque Oratório/Nevada towards Jardim Irene
Track layout
Location

Sapopemba is a monorail station of São Paulo Metro in Brazil. It belongs to Line 15-Silver, which is currently in expansion, and should go to Cidade Tiradentes, connecting with Line 2-Green in Vila Prudente. It is located in Avenida Sapopemba, 11268.

It was first scheduled, according to the Expansion Plan of the Government of the State of São Paulo, to be opened in the first semester of 2020. Later, it was officially opened on 16 December 2019, along with stations Fazenda da Juta and São Mateus.
