= Line 15 (São Paulo Metro) =

Monorail in São Paulo

São Paulo Metro Line 15 (Silver)

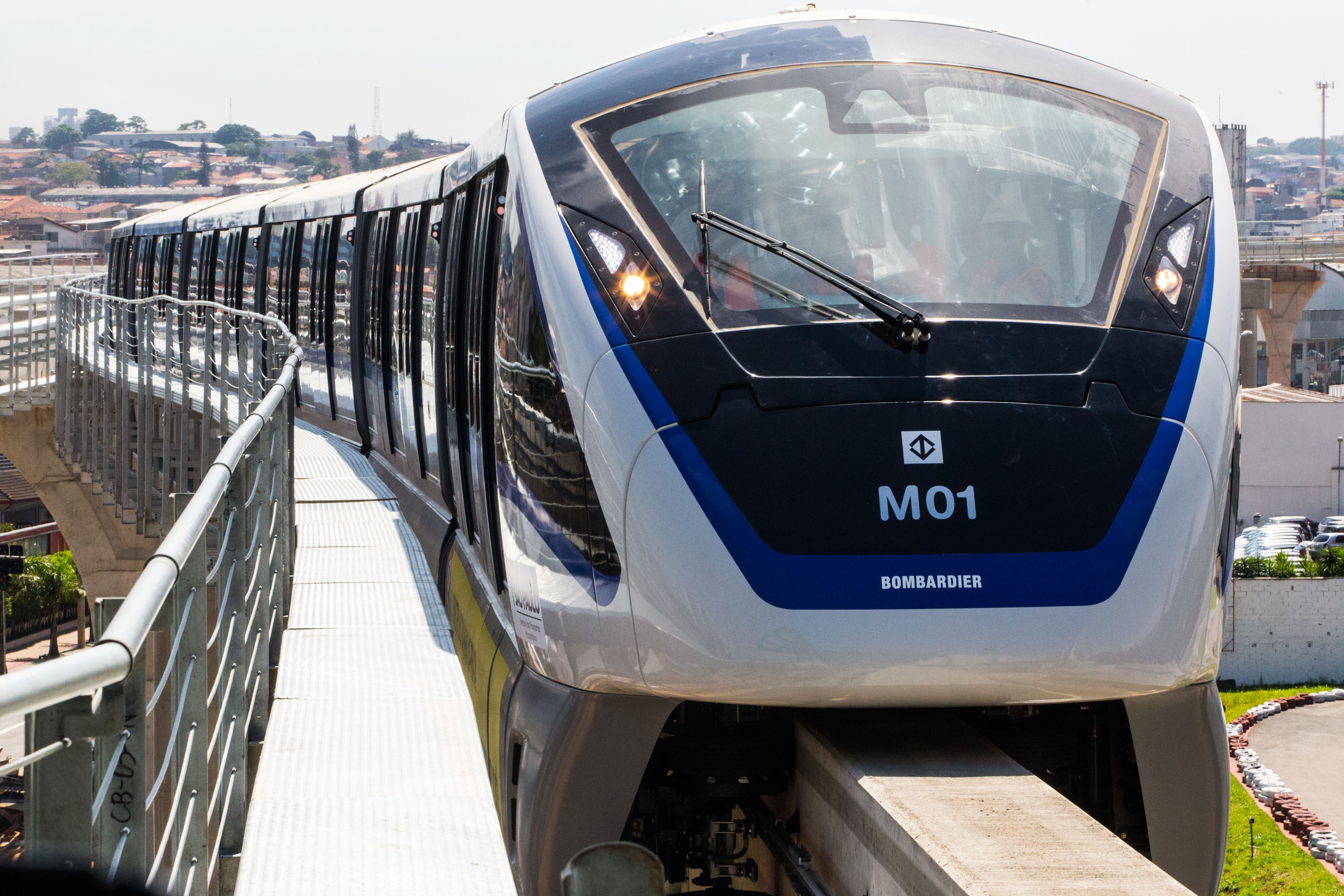

Overview
- Status: Partially in operation; Partially under construction; Partially planned
- Owner: Government of the State of São Paulo
- Locale: São Paulo, Brazil
- Termini: Vila Prudente; Jardim Colonial
- Connecting lines: Current: Future: Planned: 16
- Stations: 11 operational; 3 under construction; 4 planned

Service
- Type: Straddle beam monorail
- System: São Paulo Metro
- Operator: CMSP
- Depot(s): Oratório rail yard Ragueb Choffi rail yard (under construction)
- Rolling stock: 27 × 7-car Bombardier Innovia Monorail 300 (M stock); 19 × 7-car Alstom Innovia Monorail 300 (S stock, under construction)
- Daily ridership: 114,000/business day

History
- Work began: 2012
- Opened: 30 August 2014
- Last extension: 29 December 2021

Technical
- Line length: 14.6 km (9.1 mi)
- Character: Elevated
- Track gauge: 680 mm (2 ft 3 in)
- Electrification: 750 V DC third rail
- Operating speed: 80 km/h (50 mph)
- Signalling: Bombardier CITYFLO 650 CBTC

Line 15 (Silver) (Portuguese: Linha 15–Prata) is one of the six lines that make up the São Paulo Metro and one of the thirteen lines that make up the Metropolitan Rail Transportation Network. It is South America's first mass-transit monorail and is the first system in the world to use the Bombardier Innovia Monorail 300. When completed it will be the largest and highest capacity monorail system in the Americas and second worldwide only to the Chongqing Monorail. The first section, from Vila Prudente to Oratório, opened on 30 August 2014, initially running 10 AM–3 PM on weekends only. As of 26 October 2016, the line is operational from 4:40 AM–12 AM. The line has a free connection to Line 2-Green on Vila Prudente station and future connection to CPTM Line 10-Turquoise on Ipiranga station.

Built using completely driverless technology, the line is currently 14.6 km (9.1 mi) long and has eleven stations in the stretch between Vila Prudente and Jardim Colonial. When complete, it will be approximately 27 kilometres (17 mi) long and have eighteen stations, beginning at Ipiranga and ending at the future Hospital Cidade Tiradentes. The proposed completion of the full line is projected to be beyond 2022.

== History ==
- December 2009: Construction initiated
- 30 August 2014: Vila Prudente-Oratório (2.9 km or 1.8 mi), operating Saturdays and Sundays only, from 10AM to 3PM
- 20 December 2014: Vila Prudente-Oratório (2.9 km), operating every day from 9 AM to 2 PM
- 10 August 2015: Vila Prudente-Oratório, operating every day from 7 AM to 7PM
- 26 October 2016: Vila Prudente-Oratório, operating every day from 4:40 AM to 12 AM
- 6 April 2018: São Lucas-Vila União, operating Mondays to Fridays from 10 AM to 3 PM
- 12 January 2019: São Lucas-Vila União, operation every day from 4:40 AM to 12 AM
- 26 August 2019: Vila União-Jardim Planalto, operation every day from 4:40 AM to 12 AM
- 16 December 2019: Sapopemba-São Mateus, operation every day from 10 AM to 3 PM
- 23 December 2019: Sapopemba-São Mateus, operation every day from 9 AM to 4 PM
- 6 January 2020: Sapopemba-São Mateus, operation every day from 4:40 AM to 12 AM
- 1 June 2020: Line 15 reopened between stations Vila Prudente and Jardim Planalto
- 18 June 2020: Line 15 reopened between stations Vila Prudente and São Mateus
- 29 December 2021: Jardim Colonial opened
- 24 February 2022: First works started for the eastern extension between Jardim Colonial and Jacu-Pêssego
- 7 August 2024: Construction of western extension towards Ipiranga initiated
- 2027: Ipiranga, Boa Esperança and Jacu-Pêssego stations, and new train depot Ragueb Chohfi, opening planned

=== Incidents ===
The first serious incident of the São Paulo monorail took place close to Sapopemba station on 29 January 2019, when trains M22 and M23 collided during shunting movements after public hours. Nobody was injured, but it caused heavy damages of the head coaches of each train.

One tire of a train burst for reasons initially unknown by Bombardier on 27th February 2020, so São Paulo Metro Company continued service with reduced speed. Two days later, M20 stock lost train parts, which fell on Avenida Sapopemba. All the trains were taken to the railyard for inspection and the Line 15 was shut down for more than 3 months. São Paulo Metro Company triggered the operation of emergency buses to transport passengers from each station of the closed line. This service was free for passengers.

A second accident of two compositions in head-on collision, trains M14 and M15, occurred between Sapopemba and Jardim Planalto stations on 8 March 2023. One train driver was injured. The following day, another collision occurred during the recovery of the wrecked trains, though this time there were no injuries.

== Stations ==
Code	Station	Platforms	Position	Connections	District
**TBA**	**Ipiranga**	Side platforms	Elevated	Companhia Paulista de Trens Metropolitanos Line 10 (CPTM)	Ipiranga
VPM	Vila Prudente	Island platforms	Elevated	Vila Prudente Bus Terminal; Expresso Tiradentes	Vila Prudente
ORT	Oratório	Island platforms	Elevated	-	São Lucas
SLU	São Lucas	Island platforms	Elevated	-	São Lucas
CAD	Camilo Haddad	Island platforms	Elevated	-	São Lucas
VTL	Vila Tolstói	Island platforms	Elevated	-	São Lucas/Sapopemba
VUN	Vila União	Island platforms	Elevated	-	Sapopemba
JPL	Jardim Planalto	Island platforms	Elevated	-	Sapopemba
SAP	Sapopemba	Island platforms	Elevated	(Planned); Sapopemba/Teotônio Vilela Bus Terminal	Sapopemba
FJT	Fazenda da Juta	Island platforms	Elevated	-	Sapopemba
MAT	São Mateus	Island platforms	Elevated	São Mateus Metropolitan Terminal; São Mateus–Jabaquara Metropolitan Corridor; Metropolitan BRT East Perimetral (Planned)	São Mateus
IGT	Jardim Colonial	Island platforms	Elevated	-	São Mateus
**JEQ**	**Boa Esperança**	Island platforms	Elevated	-	Iguatemi
**JPS**	**Jacu-Pêssego**	Island platforms	Elevated	-	Iguatemi
ESM	Jardim Marilu	Island platforms	Elevated	-	Iguatemi
MBK	Jardim Pedra Branca	Island platforms	Elevated	-	Cidade Tiradentes
CDT	Cidade Tiradentes	Island platforms	Elevated	16 (Planned); Cidade Tiradentes Bus Terminal	Cidade Tiradentes
HCT	Hospital Cidade Tiradentes	Island platforms	Elevated	-	Cidade Tiradentes

Obs.: Stations in bold are under construction. Stations in italic are in planning.

== Gallery ==
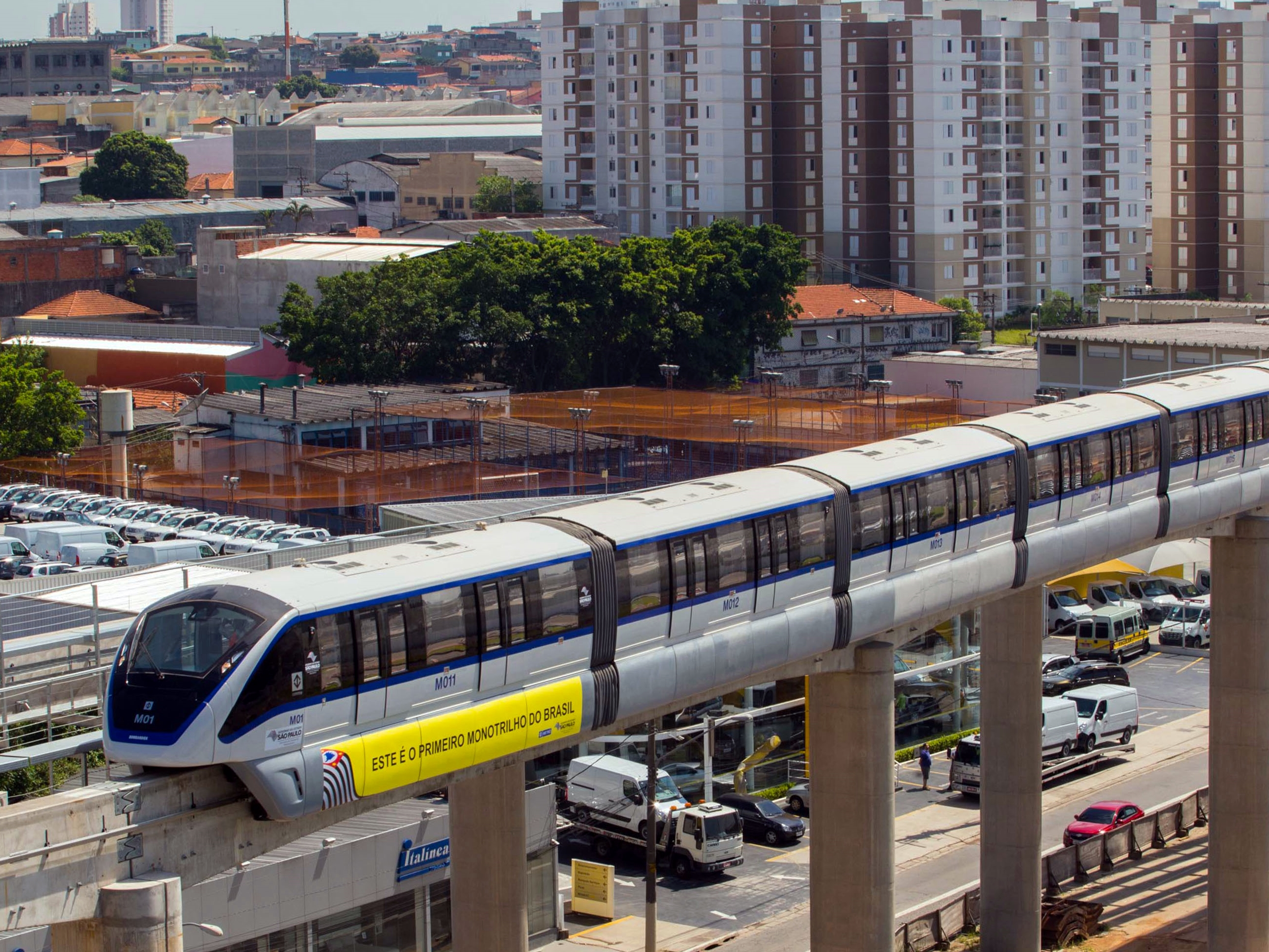
First train under testing in January 2014

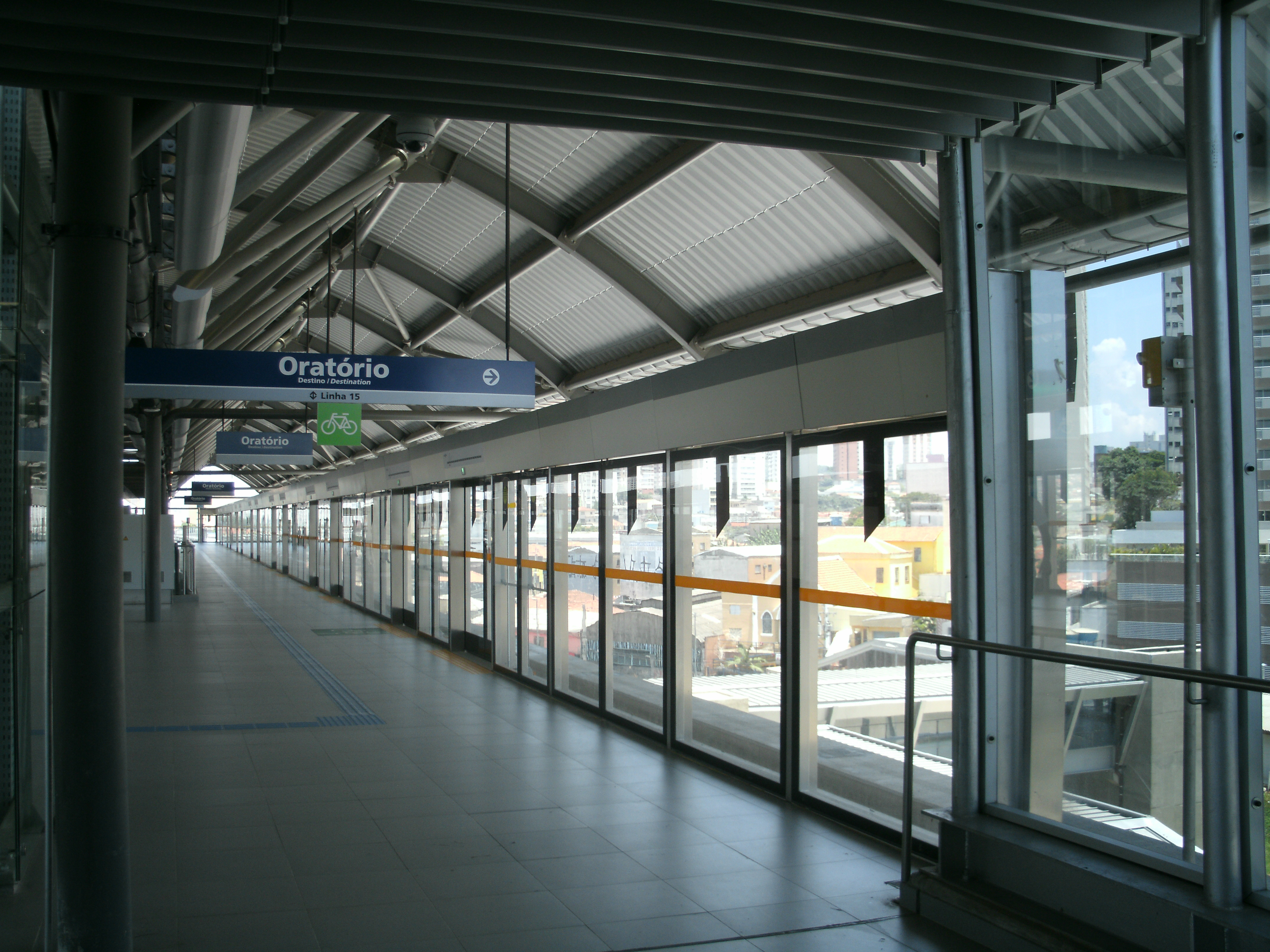
Station Vila Prudente

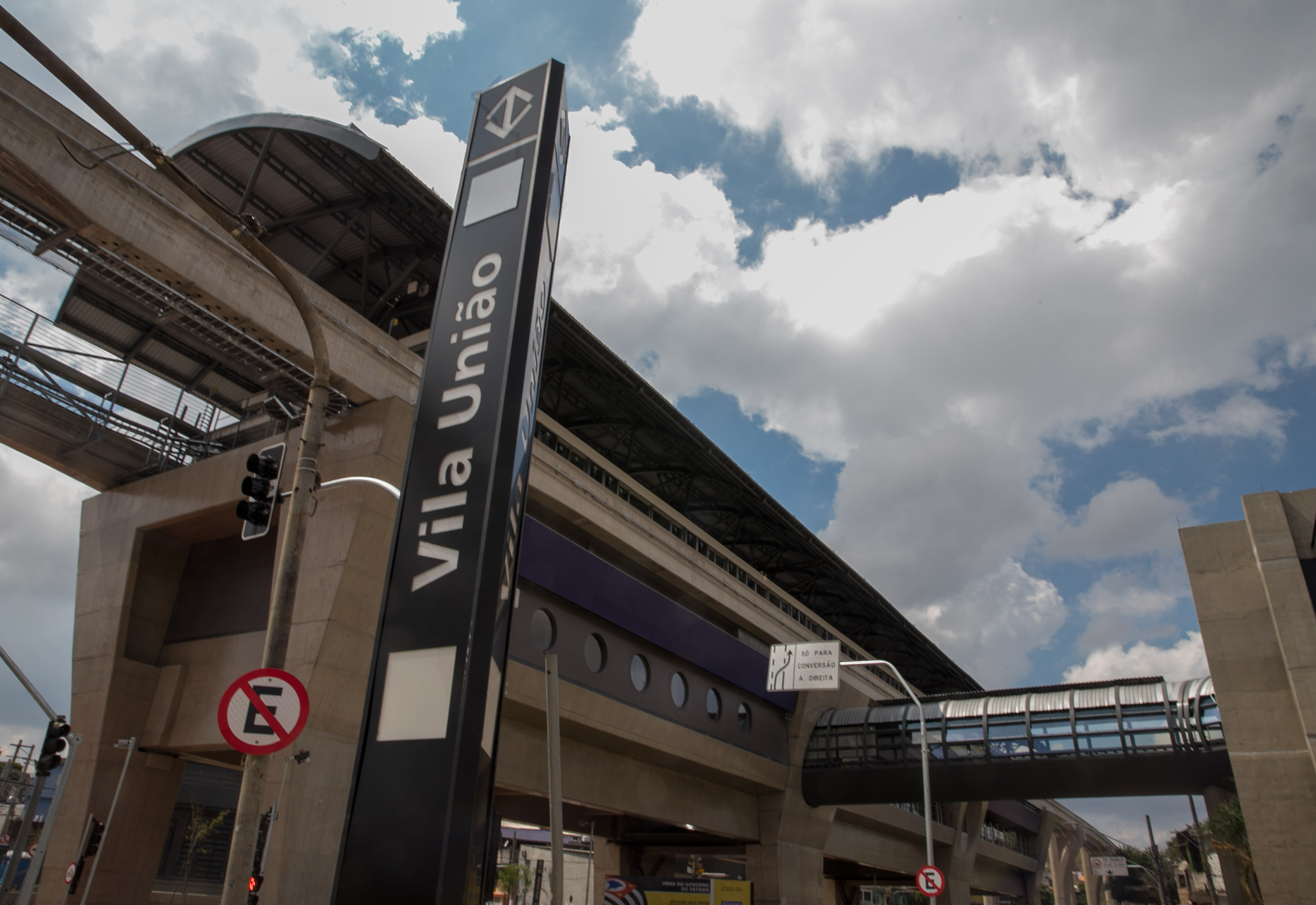
Station Vila União

== See also ==
- Line 17 (São Paulo Metro)
- List of monorail systems
