= Innovia Monorail =

Automated monorail system

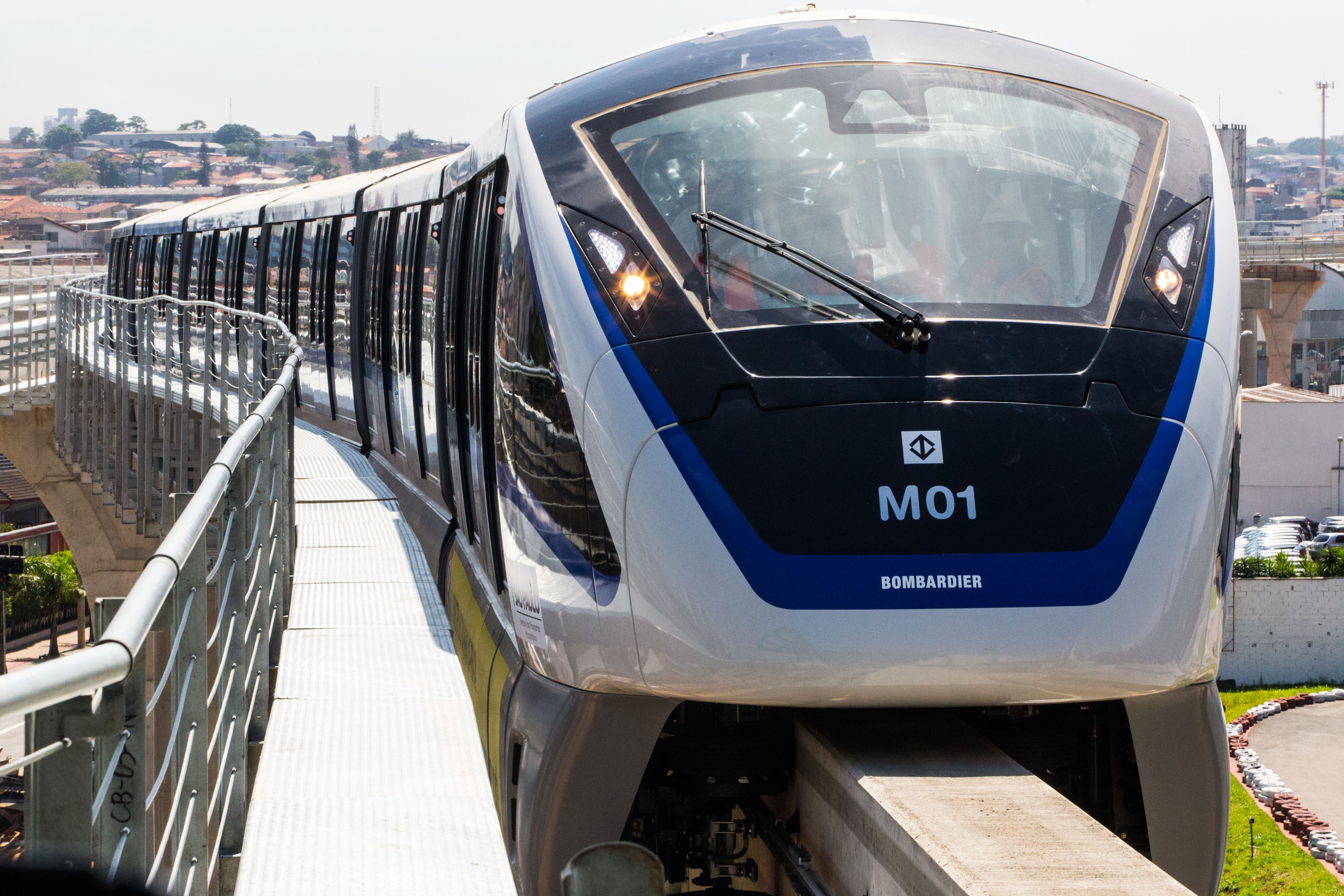
- Innovia Monorail 300 in São Paulo, Brazil
- In service: 1989–present
- Manufacturers: Bombardier (1989–2021); Von Roll (1994); Adtranz (1994–2001); CRRC Puzhen (2014–present); Alstom (2021–present)
- Designers: Alweg, Bombardier, WED Enterprises
- Built at: Hortolândia, Brazil; Kingston, Ontario, Canada; Wuhu, China (CRRC Puzhen); Derby, United Kingdom
- Family name: Innovia

Innovia Monorail is a fully automated and driverless monorail system currently manufactured and marketed by Alstom as part of its Innovia series of fully automated transportation systems. Its straddle-beam design is based on the Alweg monorail, which was first developed in the 1950s and later popularized by Disney at their theme parks.

== History ==
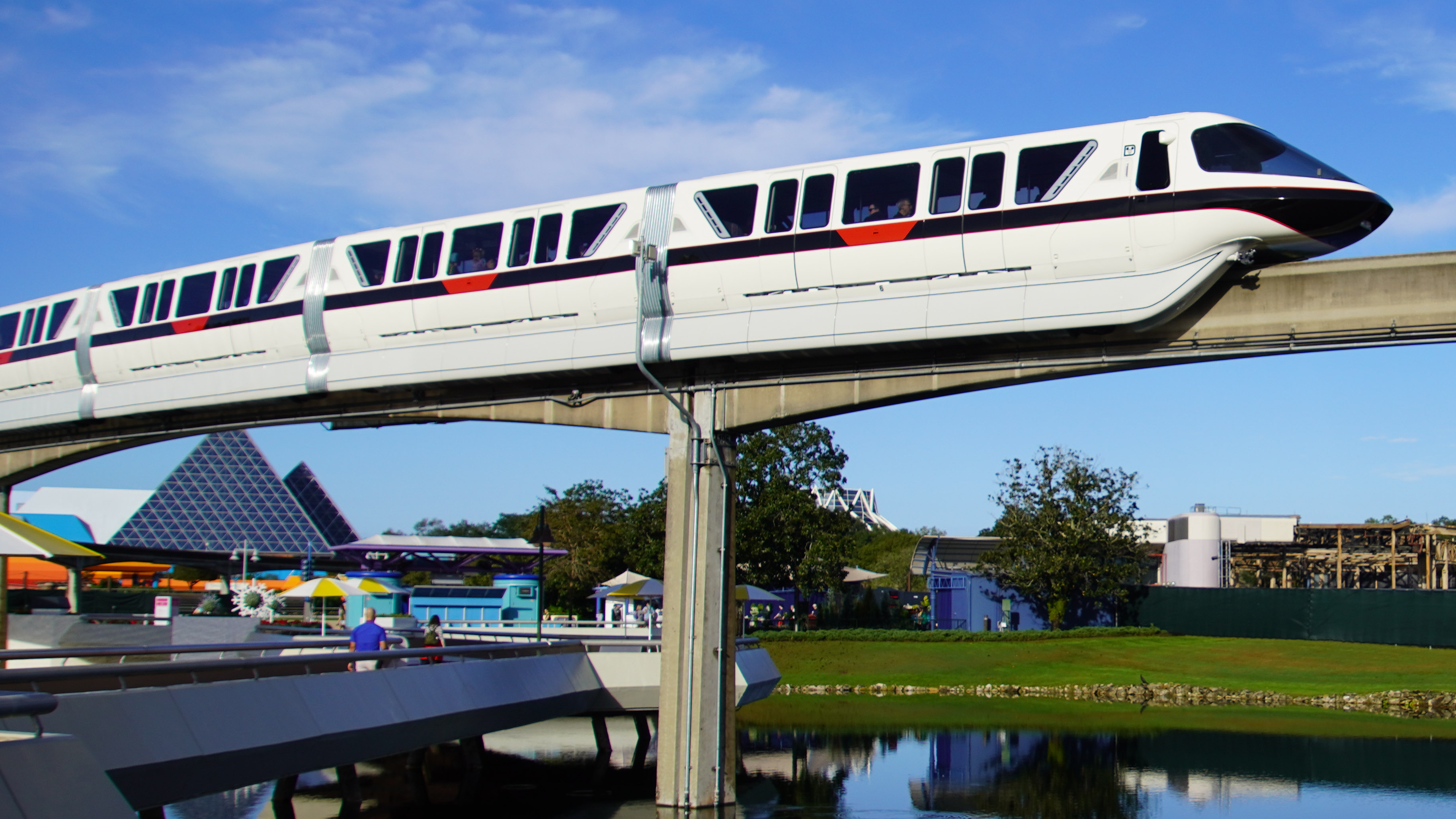
Walt Disney World Monorail

In 1989, Walt Disney World got a new fleet of Mark VI monorail trains built by Bombardier Transportation. Bombardier later supplied its first turnkey monorail system in 1991 to Tampa International Airport in Florida; followed by a contract for JTA Skyway Monorail system in Jacksonville, Florida in 1994. Shortly after, in 1996, Newark Liberty International Airport opened a Von Roll monorail system to connect all its terminals. Von Roll technology was sold to Adtranz and later acquired by Bombardier. These early systems are now grouped under the name Innovia Monorail 100.

In July 2004, Las Vegas opened its 6-mile long Mark IV Las Vegas Monorail monorail system (technology now known Innovia Monorail 200 system). The system suffered from repeated technical difficulties, including parts falling from a moving vehicle, in the first few months of service. The system was temporarily closed for 4 months and reopened in December 2004. Since then, the monorail carries 30,000 passengers daily; despite this, it is still not meeting the original ridership estimates.

In 2010, the cities of Riyadh, Saudi Arabia and São Paulo, Brazil placed orders from Bombardier for its latest Innovia Monorail 300 system. As of 2015, both systems are still in delivery. The Riyadh system is for the new King Abdullah Financial District, which will be a car-free economic hub in the Middle East. The São Paulo system will be part of the city's mass transit network and serve 17 stations between the residential districts of Vila Prudente and Cidade Tiradentes. The line started its operations in August 2014 and currently includes ten stations.

In November 2014, Bombardier signed a joint venture (JV) agreement with CSR (now CRRC) Puzhen in China to develop and manufacture Innovia Monorail and Innovia APM vehicles for the Chinese market.

In August 2019, a consortium including Bombardier signed an agreement with the National Authority for Tunnels in Cairo, Egypt which included the development and build of 70 4-car monorail trains for $2.85 billion for two new lines, between East Cairo and the New Administrative Capital, and between Giza and 6th October City.

== Technical characteristics ==
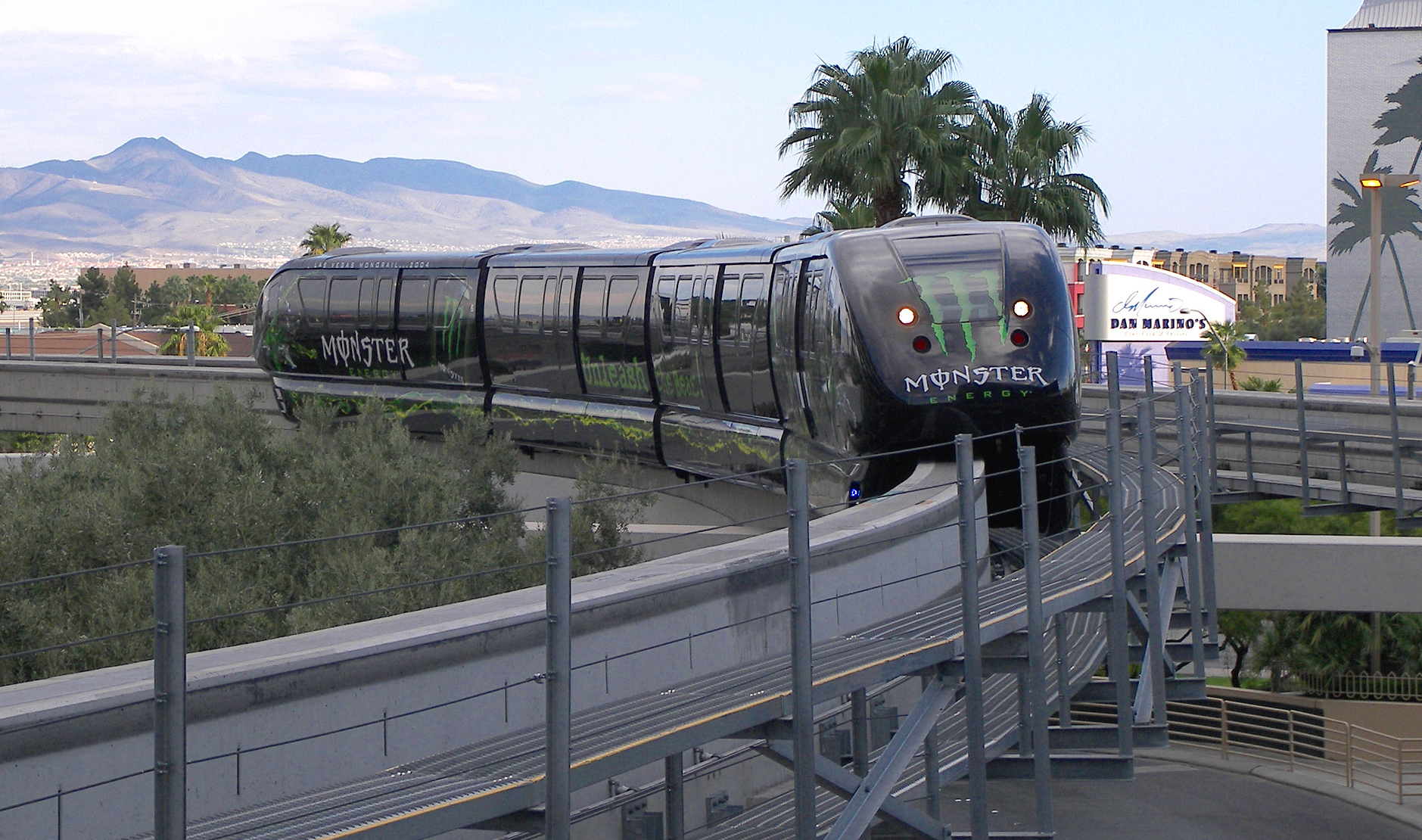
Las Vegas Monorail

=== Driverless operation ===
Innovia Monorails are all fully automated and use a variety of train control technologies. However, the Riyadh and São Paulo monorails are both equipped with CITYFLO 650 communications-based train control. Driverless operation offers many advantages including improved safety, high reliability, shorter headways between trains and lower maintenance costs.

=== Guidebeams ===
These monorails operate on a narrow, elevated guidebeam. Pre-cast, post-tensioned guidebeams are constructed at an off-site location and later installed on the system. The guidebeams are 690 millimeters (27 in) wide. The Innovia Monorail 300 was designed to navigate curves as tight as 46 m and a maximum grade of 6%. Monorail switches are either beam replacement or multi-position pivot switches.

=== Safety ===
Innovia Monorail systems have evacuation walkways down the entire length of the guidebeam. These walkways allow passengers to escape any onboard hazard. The maintenance crew also uses these walkways for repairs and general maintenance to the system.

=== Capacity ===
Bombardier currently says the INNOVIA 300 has capacity for 40,000 passengers per hour per direction (pphpd), equivalent to the best monorails. Bombardier has also stated the system can handle 49,600 pphpd with eight car trains at 75 second headways (48 trains per hour) with six passengers per square metre. This is equivalent to the best rapid transit systems.

== Production ==
The three generations of Innovia Monorails have been assembled in different plants. Today, there are multiple production facilities which have produced the trains including Kingston, Canada; Wuhu and Liuzhou, China; Hortolândia, Brazil and Derby, United Kingdom.

== System implementations ==
=== Innovia Monorail 100 systems ===
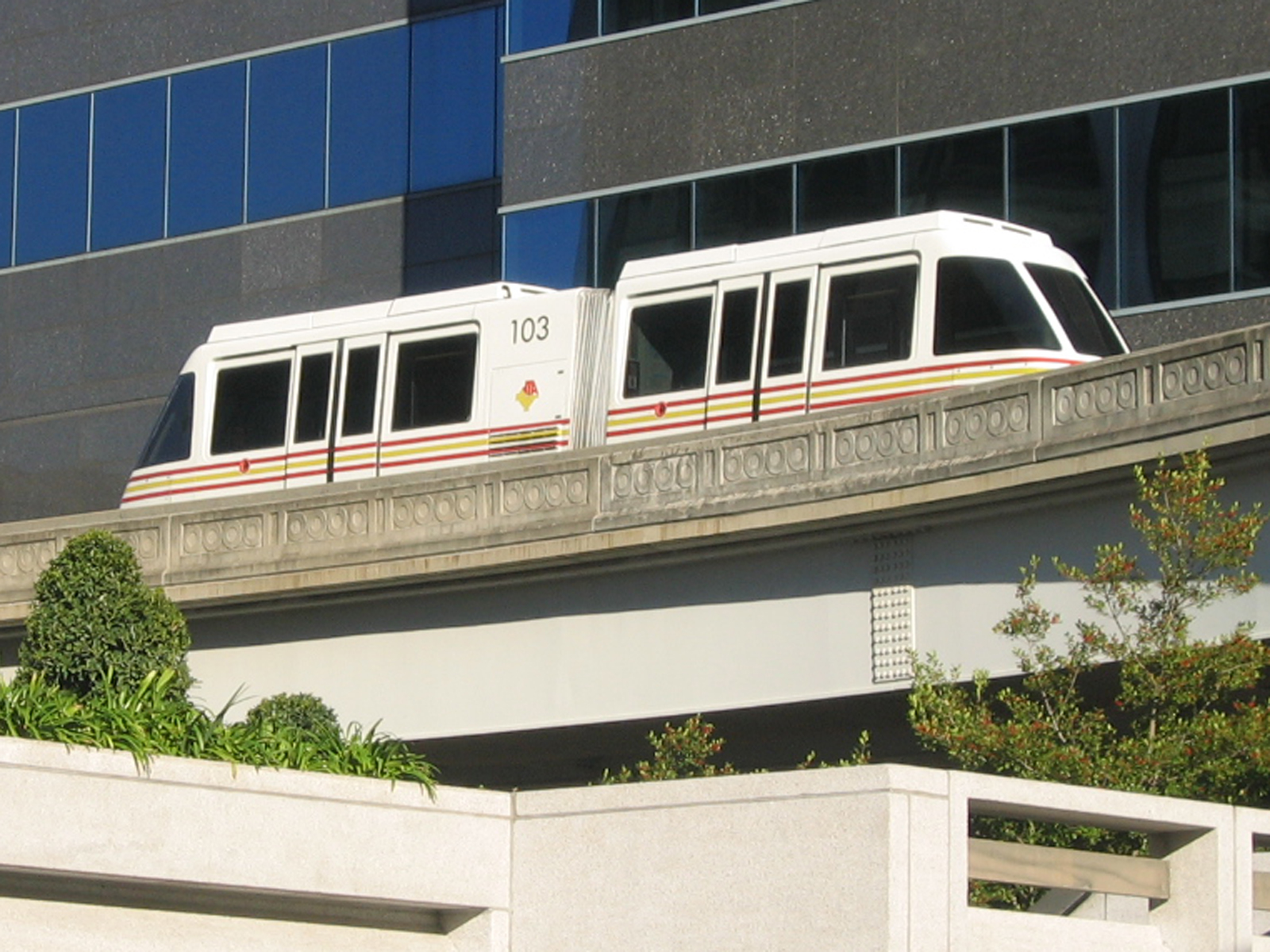
Innovia Monorail 100 on the Jacksonville Skyway

==== Current ====
- AirTrain Newark, Newark Liberty International Airport, United States

==== Defunct ====
- Jacksonville Skyway Monorail, United States
- Tampa International Airport, United States (1991–2020)

=== Innovia Monorail 200 systems ===
- Las Vegas Monorail, United States

=== Innovia Monorail 300 systems ===
==== Current ====
- Line 15 (Silver), São Paulo Metro, Brazil
- Monorail line 1 & 2, Wuhu, China
- MRT Yellow Line and MRT Pink Line, Bangkok Metropolitan Region, Thailand

==== Under construction ====
- King Abdullah Financial District (KAFD) Monorail, Saudi Arabia
- Monorail line 1 & 2, Liuzhou, China (cancelled)
- Cairo Monorail, Egypt
- Santiago Monorail Santiago de los Caballeros, Dominican Republic

== Awards ==
The Chicago Athenaeum organizes the Good Design Award competition every year. In 2014, the Innovia Monorail 300 was a winner of the Good Design Award in the Transportation 2014 category.

== Accidents and incidents ==
The first city in the world to have an Innovia 300 monorail in operation, São Paulo has had its system break-down on multiple occasions, due to problems in implementation and on the train project itself, ever since it started operating commercially. In 2016, a train departed from the Oratório station with its doors open, which luckily caused no accidents, due to an error in the programming made by Bombardier on the train's computers. These trains operate on unprotected 15-meter (45-feet) high tracks. In January 2019, two trains collided at the then unopened Jardim Planalto station, causing both trains to be unusable for the remainder of that year. According to the metro workers' union, this accident was caused because there's a gap in the system: if one train is shut down, it disappears from the control system and is not seen by others, which could (and supposedly did) cause crashes. In January 2020, due to poor constructing, screws fell from one of the line's track-switches, causing the line to operate precariously for five days. The section in which this took place (in the vicinity of the São Lucas station) had been opened only two years prior. In February 2020, the worst accident so far happened: a tire from the train M20 exploded, causing the system to completely shut down while Bombardier technicians looked into what happened, partially reopening ninety-four days later (on June 1) and fully reopening 111 days after the incident, on June 18. According to a preliminary report by the São Paulo State's Research Institute, what caused the incident were hundreds of imperfections on the concrete rails, which caused strong vibrations that, in turn, made the tire's runflat mechanism touch the rubber from inside the wheel, causing premature wear and consequent rupture. After investigating, it was found out that all 23 operational trains from the line's fleet had been affected by this issue.

== See also ==
- Innovia APM systems
- Innovia Metro systems
- Hitachi
- Scomi SUTRA
