= Oratório (São Paulo Metro) =

São Paulo Metro station

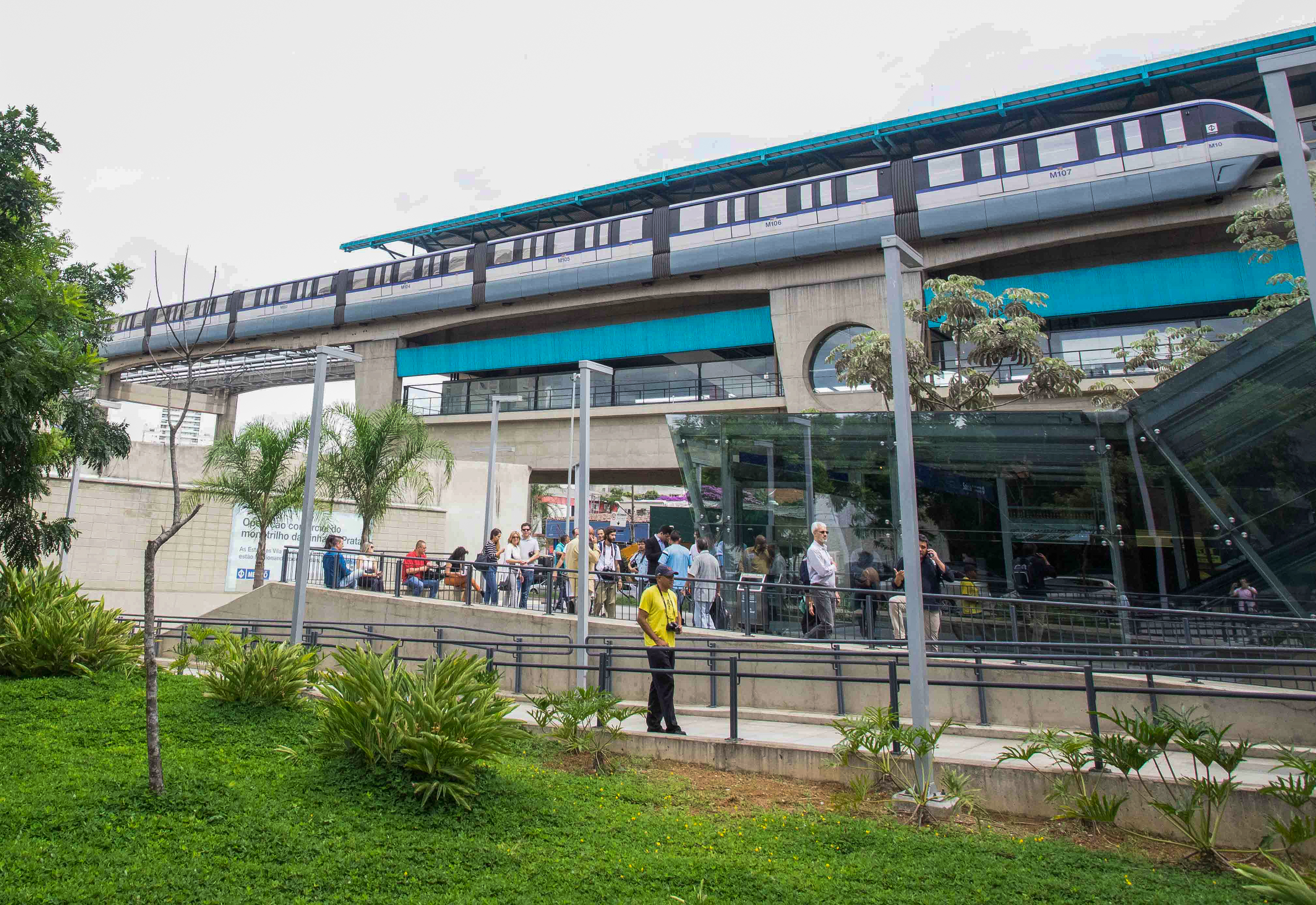
- Oratório station

General information
- Location: Av do Oratório, 165, São Lucas; São Paulo; Brazil
- Coordinates: 23°34′57″S 46°33′42″W
- Owner: Government of the State of São Paulo
- Operator: Companhia do Metropolitano de São Paulo
- Platforms: Island platforms
- Connections: Bus interchange

Construction
- Structure type: Elevated
- Accessible: y
- Architect: Luiz Carlos Esteves

Other information
- Station code: ORT

History
- Opened: August 30, 2014

Passengers
- 6,000/business day

Services
Preceding station	São Paulo Metro	Following station
Vila Prudente Terminus	Line 15	São Lucas towards Jacu-Pêssego
Track layout
Location

Oratório is a station on Line 15–Silver of the São Paulo Metro, opened on August 30, 2014. When concluded, the line will connect Vila Prudente to the district of Cidade Tiradentes.

Oratório station is placed in the confluence between Avenues Prof. Luis Inácio de Anhaia Melo and do Oratório, in the borough of Jardim Independência, district of São Lucas, in the Eastside of the city.

Currently, there are plans to privatize the line. Former Governor Geraldo Alckmin announced, in a reunion of the managing council of Public-Private Partnerships, that the lines 15-Silver and 17-Gold will be conceded to the private initiative, because of the financial difficulties of the state in the expansion and maintenance of the metropolitan network.

== History ==
Initially, the station would be the terminus of Line 2-Green in its east branch. However, the project was cancelled when Metro announced their new project: Line 2 would reach to station Tatuapé, connecting to Line 3-Red. Later, the project was changed again to station Penha, but station Oratório was still cancelled.

Following that, the station was transferred to the future Line 6-Orange, where it would be its terminus. However, the line was expanded and its terminus station was changed to Cidade Líder, and this branch didn't include station Oratório. After that, it would be part of a branch line, named Oratório Branch (Ramal Oratório), which also included station Vila Alpina, but the project didn't move on. Only in 2009, a project was announced and finally moved on: Line 2-Green would have an extension to Cidade Tiradentes Hospital, in an elevated monorail, replacing Expresso Tiradentes, which was cancelled.

The construction of station Oratório began in April 2010, while Vila Prudente was already under construction since December 2009. Posteriorly, in 2011, the pre-working phase of the next station, São Lucas, began. The first branch, which included stations Vila Prudente and Oratório, had their opening scheduled for the second semester of 2013, while station São Lucas was scheduled to 2014.

The Line 15-Silver was officially openen on August 30, 2014, initially in restrict operating hours, from 10 a.m. to 3 p.m. Later, its working time was extended. The trains started circulating from 7 a.m. to 7 p.m. From November 20 and on, Line 15 started working from 6 a.m. to 8 p.m. between the two stations. Only since October 26, 2016, the line started working in its normal time, from 4 a.m. to midnight.

This working time limitations were necessary, so the equipment and systems test protocols could be concluded, because it was a new system at the time, besides ensuring the users security and the line operation.

== Station layout ==
P Platform level
P Platform level	Westbound	← toward Vila Prudente
P Platform level	Island platform, doors open on the left
P Platform level	Eastbound	toward São Mateus →
M	Mezzanine	Fare control, ticket office, customer service, Bilhete Único/BOM recharge machines
G	Street level	Exit/entrance

== SPTrans lines ==
The following SPTrans bus lines can be accessed. Passengers may use a Bilhete Único card for transfer:

Line #	Destination
3024–10	Vila Industrial
4222–10	Mooca
5142–10	Terminal Sapopemba
N531/11	Terminal Sacomã

== EMTU lines ==
The following EMTU bus lines can be accessed:

Line	Destination
102	São Paulo (IV Centenário)
