= Boa Esperança (São Paulo Metro) =

Monorail station in São Paulo, Brazil

General information
- Location: Av. Ragueb Chohfi, 3002, Iguatemi; São Paulo; Brazil
- Coordinates: 23°35′48.66″S 46°27′23.65″W
- Owner: Government of the State of São Paulo
- Operator: Companhia do Metropolitano de São Paulo
- Platforms: Island platforms

Construction
- Structure type: Elevated
- Accessible: y

Other information
- Station code: JEQ

History
- Opening: 2025 (estimated)
- Former names: Jequiriçá (project phase)

Services
Preceding station	São Paulo Metro	Following station
Jardim Colonial towards Vila Prudente	Line 15	Jacu-Pêssego Terminus
Track layout
Location

Boa Esperança is a future monorail station of São Paulo Metro. It will serve Line 15-Silver, which connects the nearby neighbourhood to the Metro Line 2-Green in Vila Prudente. It will be located at Avenida Ragueb Chohfi, 3002.

The station is part of the 3 kilometres (1.9 mi) expansion plan towards Jacu-Pêssego.

== Toponymy ==
In 2009, when the line project was publicly presented, the station was temporarily named as Jequiriçá, a street located next to the station. After toponymic studies, the station was renamed to Boa Esperança, the nearest neighbourhood of the station.

== Station layout ==
P Platform level
P Platform level	Westbound	← toward Jardim Colonial
P Platform level	Island platform, doors open on the left
P Platform level	Eastbound	toward Jacu-Pêssego →
M	Mezzanine	Fare control, ticket office, customer service, Bilhete Único/BOM recharge machines
G	Street level	Exit/entrance
