= M stock =

M stock may refer to:

- London Underground M Stock
- São Paulo Metro M stock
