= JEQ =

Jeq or JEQ may refer to:

- Boa Esperanca station (station code JEQ), a future monorail station in São Paulo, Brazil
- Jewellery Quarter station (station code JEQ), West Midlands, England
- Jump if equal, a branch instruction in computer programming
