= Jardim Colonial (São Paulo Metro) =

Railway station in São Paulo, Brazil

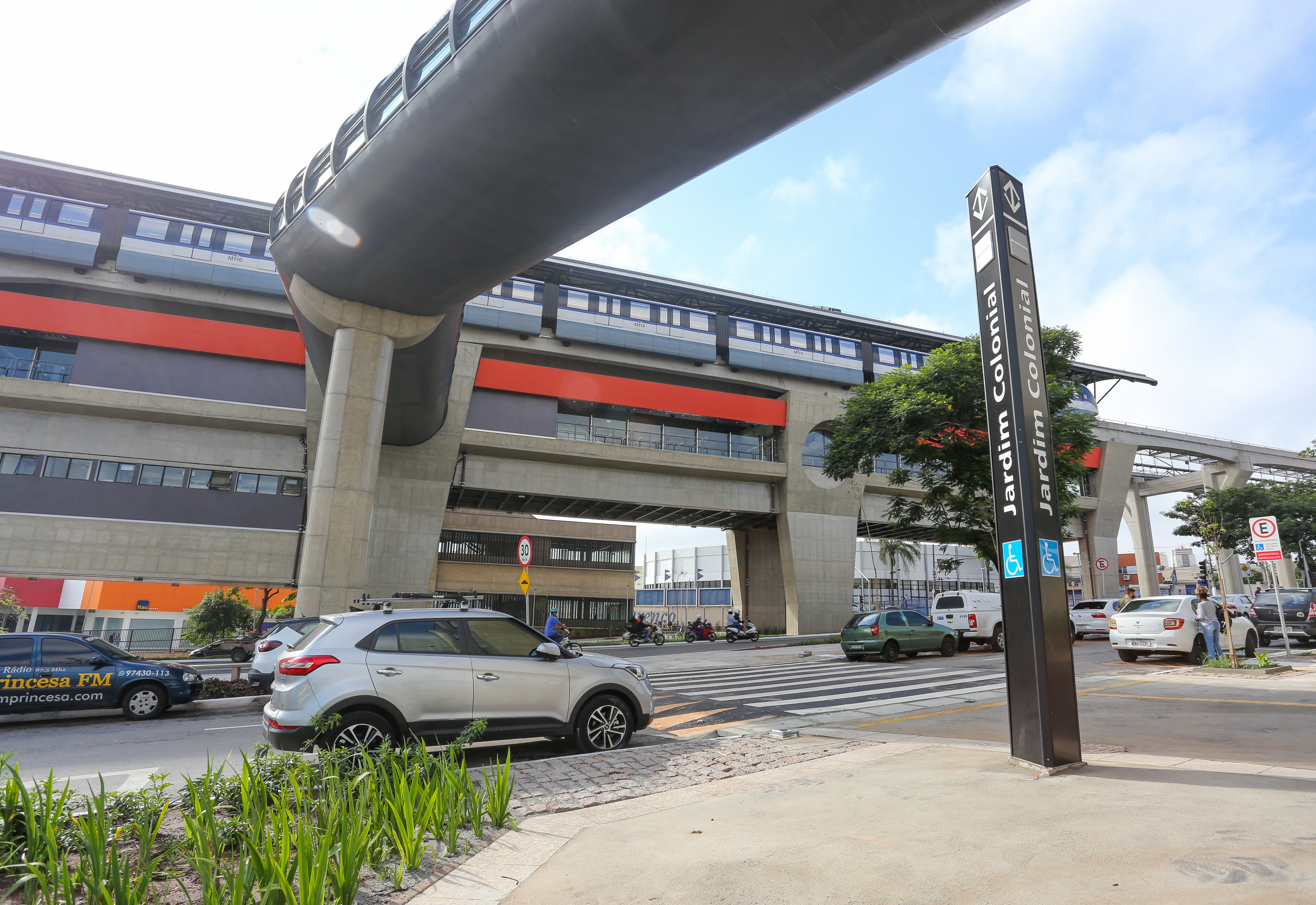
- Photo of the station on the day of its opening.

General information
- Location: Av. Ragueb Chohfi, 1400, São Mateus; São Paulo; Brazil
- Owner: Government of the State of São Paulo
- Operator: Companhia do Metropolitano de São Paulo
- Platforms: Island platform

Construction
- Structure type: Elevated
- Accessible: y

Other information
- Station code: IGT

History
- Opened: 29 December 2021
- Former names: Iguatemi

Passengers
- 6,000/business day

Services
Preceding station	São Paulo Metro	Following station
São Mateus towards Vila Prudente	Line 15	Boa Esperança towards Jacu-Pêssego
Track layout
Location

Jardim Colonial is a monorail station of São Paulo Metro. It serves Line 15-Silver, which connects the nearby neighbourhood to the Metro Line 2-Green in Vila Prudente. It's located in Avenida Ragueb Chohfi, 1400.

It was opened on 29 December 2021.

== Toponymy ==
In 2009, when the line project was publicly presented, the station was temporarily named Iguatemi, district located 1 km (0.62 mi) away from the future station. After toponymic studies, the station was officially named Jardim Colonial, name of the nearest neighbourhood.

== Station layout ==
P Platform level
P Platform level	Westbound	← toward Vila Prudente
P Platform level	Island platform, doors open on the left or right
P Platform level	Westbound	← toward Vila Prudente
M	Mezzanine	Fare control, ticket office, customer service, Bilhete Único/TOP recharge machines
G	Street level	Exit/entrance
