= Alstom Innovia =

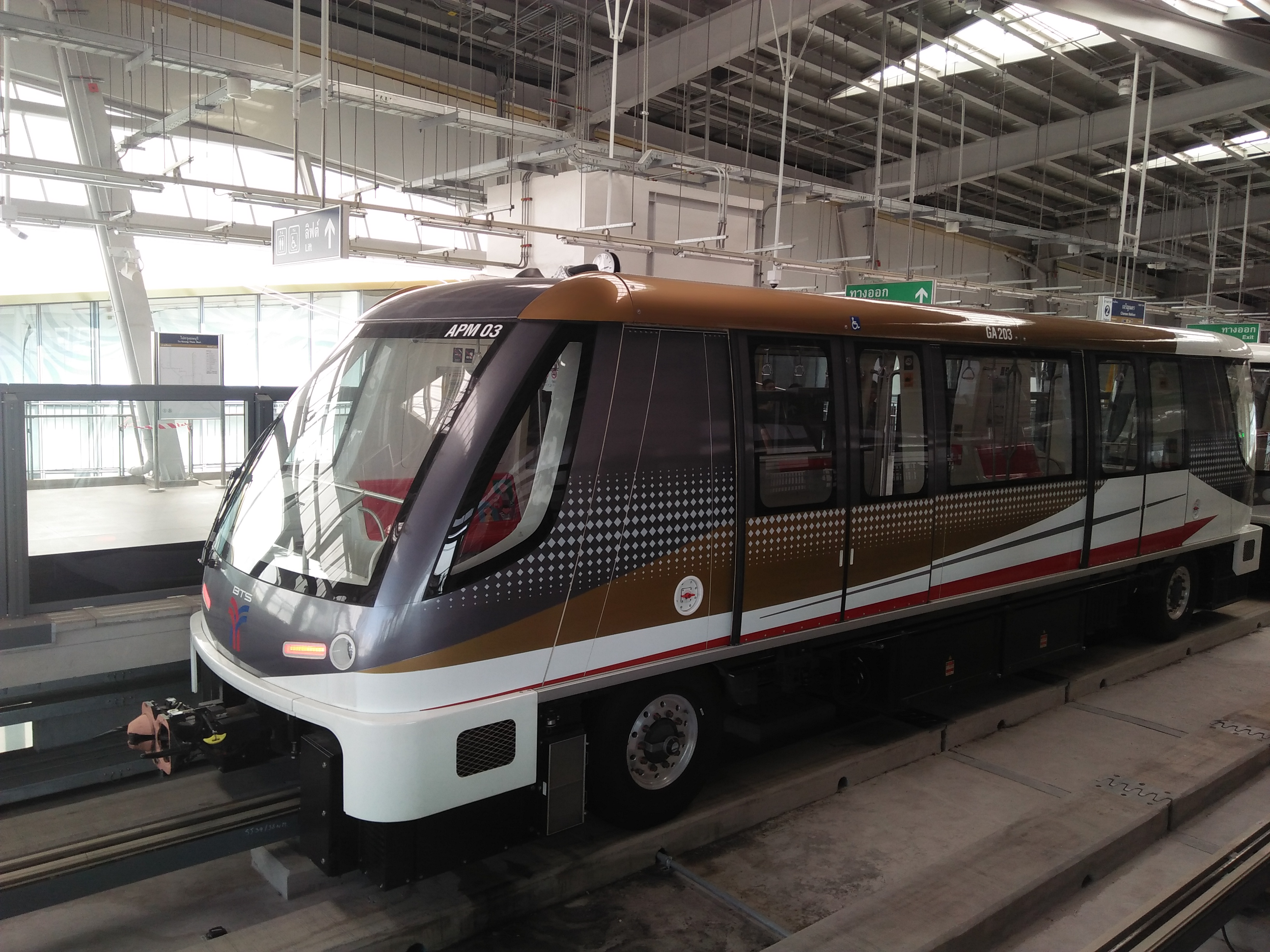
Innovia APM

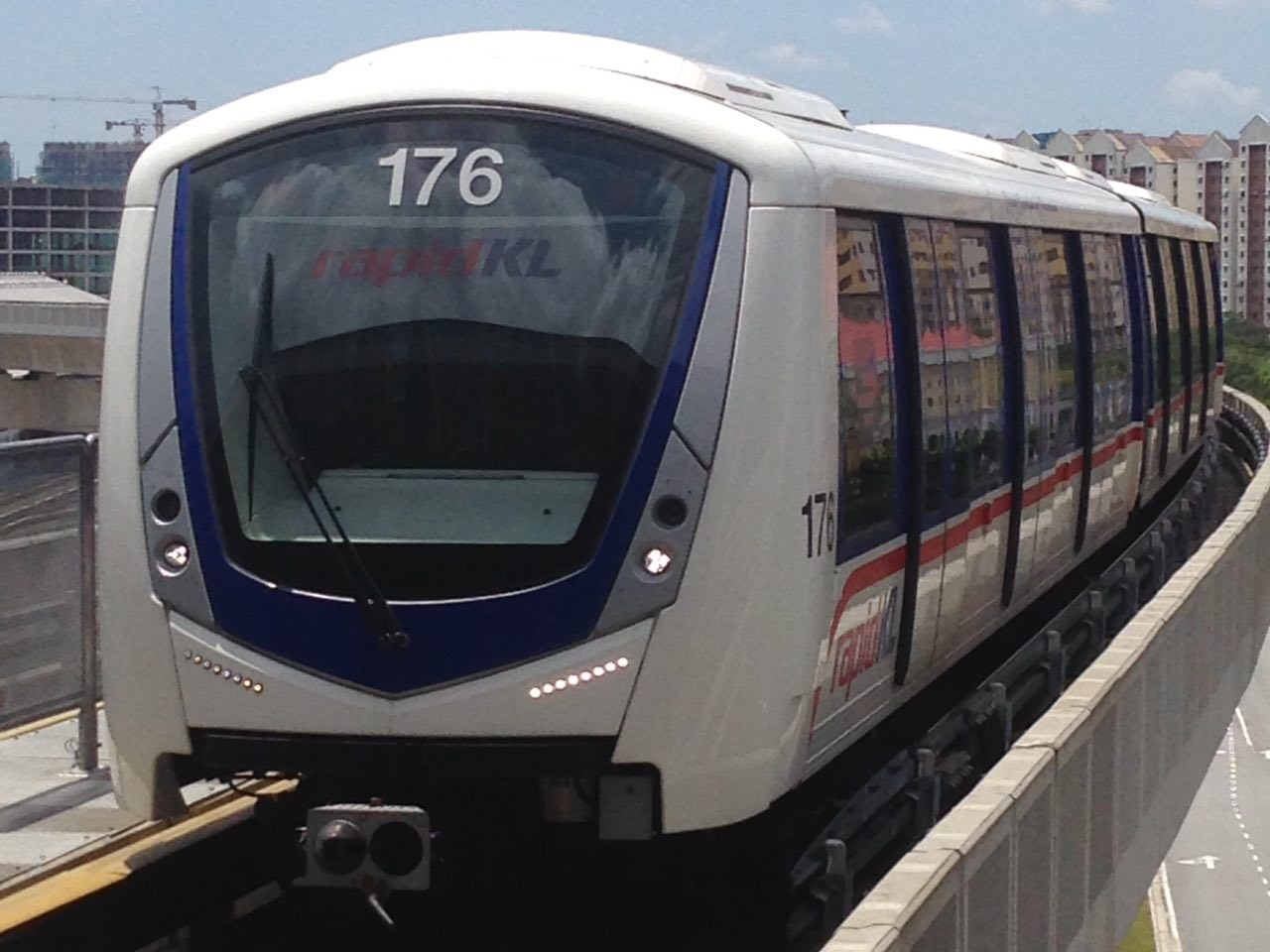
Innovia Metro

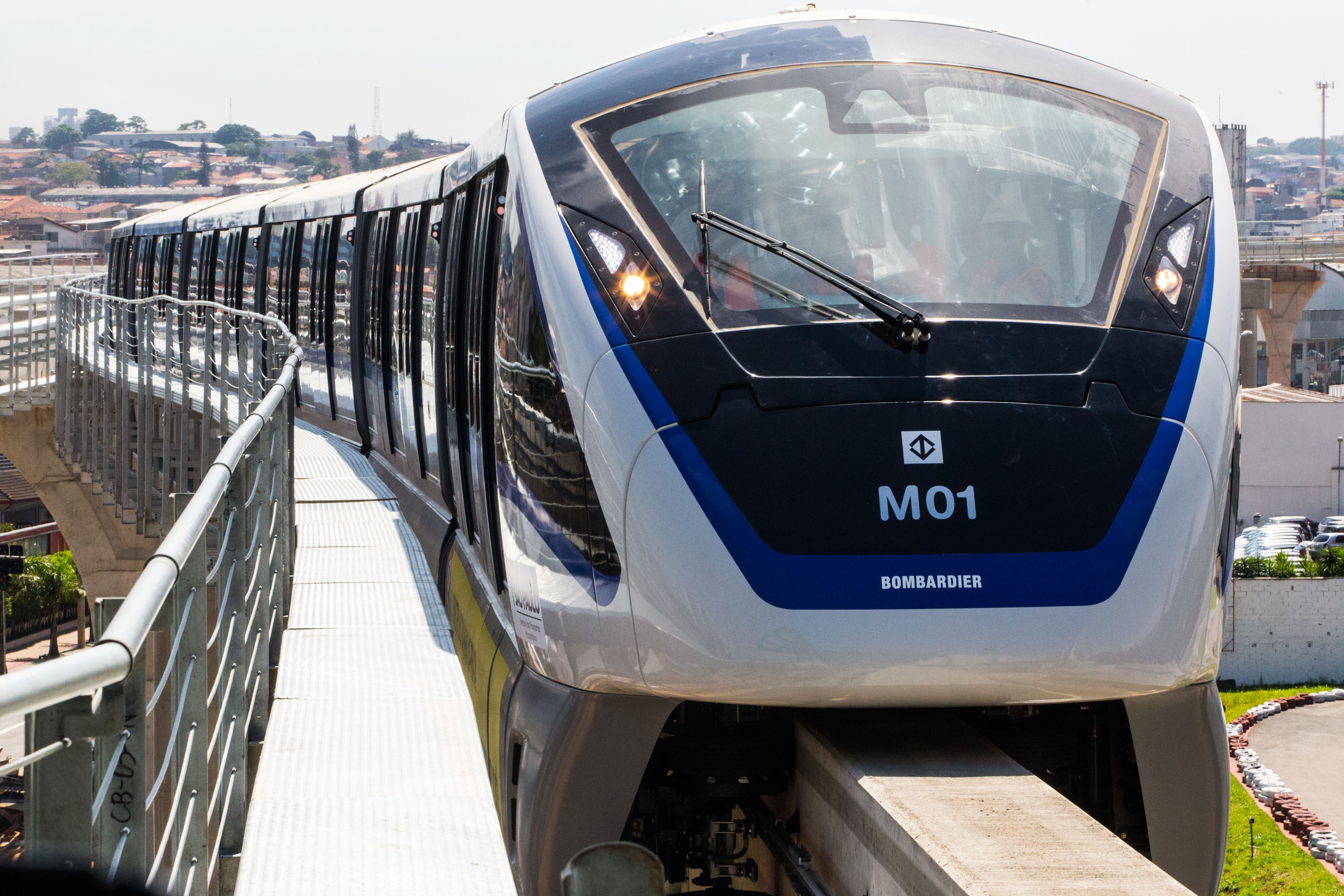
Innovia Monorail

Innovia is a product line of fully automated and driverless transportation systems offered by Alstom. Originally Innovia only referred to the automated people mover technology acquired from Adtranz in 2001. Innovia now refers to the following automated transit systems:

- Innovia APM – automated people mover system
- Innovia Metro – automated medium-capacity metro system
- Innovia Monorail – automated monorail system
