= Liuzhou Rail Transit =

Monorail metro system in Liuzhou, China

Overview
- Native name: 柳州轨道交通
- Locale: Liuzhou, Guangxi, China
- Transit type: Rapid transit
- Number of lines: 4
- Number of stations: 97

Technical
- System length: 150.1 km

Liuzhou Rail Transit (Chinese: 柳州轨道交通; pinyin: Liǔzhōu guǐdào jiāotōng) is a cancelled monorail system in Liuzhou, Guangxi Zhuang autonomous region, China. Lines 1 and 2 were under construction using monorails manufactured under a JV between Bombardier Transportation and CRRC. It was planned to consist of lines 1, 2, 3 and 4 and suburban lines S1, S2 and S3.

The project construction has been suspended since 2022. As of 2024, some of the structures are being demolished.

== History ==
Construction of a light railroad had started in Liuzhou in 1928. The railroad opened on March 1, 1933, and had two branches (one via Dongda Road to the Liuzhou Brick Factory and another to the garrison of First Division of the National Revolutionary Army) and a total length of 8.3 km. The train used was a small trail that needed manpower to assist. However, the line was shut down in the early 1950s and the track was demolished.

=== Timeline ===
- In December 2016, construction of Line 1 started.
- In 2017, the Ministry of Environmental Protection reviewed and approved the "Environmental Impact Report on Liuzhou Urban Rail Transit Network and Construction Planning".
- In June 2017 the construction of Line 2 started.
- In September 2020, testing on Line 1 began.
- In November 2020, the Guangxi Cultural Tourism Development Conference was held in Liuzhou. The Liuzhou Rail Transit was one of the eleven observation points of the conference.
- In 2022, the project was suspended.
- On 4 November 2024, construction company decided to demolish some completed structures.

== Planned lines ==
Line	Terminals		Planned Opening	Length km	Stations
1	Shangbanqiao	Shangqin	2025	46.3	35
2	Xianglanxincun	Bailian Airport	2024	27.7	24
3	Hexi Industrial Park	Guishan	2025	21.9	17
4	Jinde	Pangu	2025	54.2	30
