= Subprefecture of Sapopemba =

Sapopemba
- Subprefecture
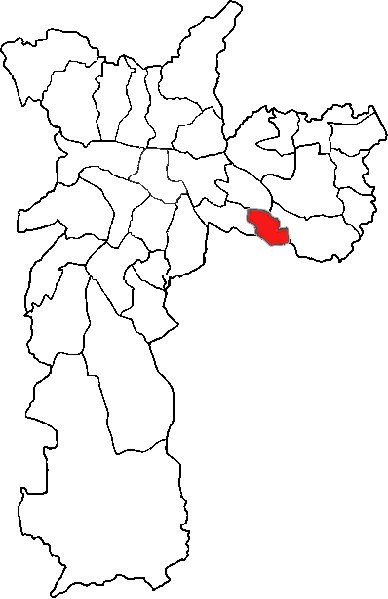
- Location of the Subprefecture of Sapopemba in São Paulo

- Location of municipality of São Paulo within the State of São Paulo
- Country: Brazil
- Region: Southeast
- State: São Paulo
- Municipality: São Paulo
- Administrative Zone: Southeast
- Districts: Sapopemba

Government
  - Type: Subprefecture
  - Subprefect: Benedito Gonçalves Pereira

Area
  - Total: 135 km^{2} (52 sq mi)

Population (2010)
  - Total: 284,524
- Website: Subprefeitura Sapopemba (Portuguese)

The Subprefecture of Sapopemba is one of 32 subprefectures of the city of São Paulo, Brazil. It comprises one district: Sapopemba. It is divided into 51 neighborhoods and its population density is 21,076 inhabitants/km^{2}. This subprefecture was founded in 2013 from a territory of the Subprefecture of Vila Prudente, which makes it the youngest subprefecture of the city of São Paulo.
