= São Mateus (São Paulo Metro) =

São Paulo Metro station

Coordinates: 23.6123°S 46.4774°W

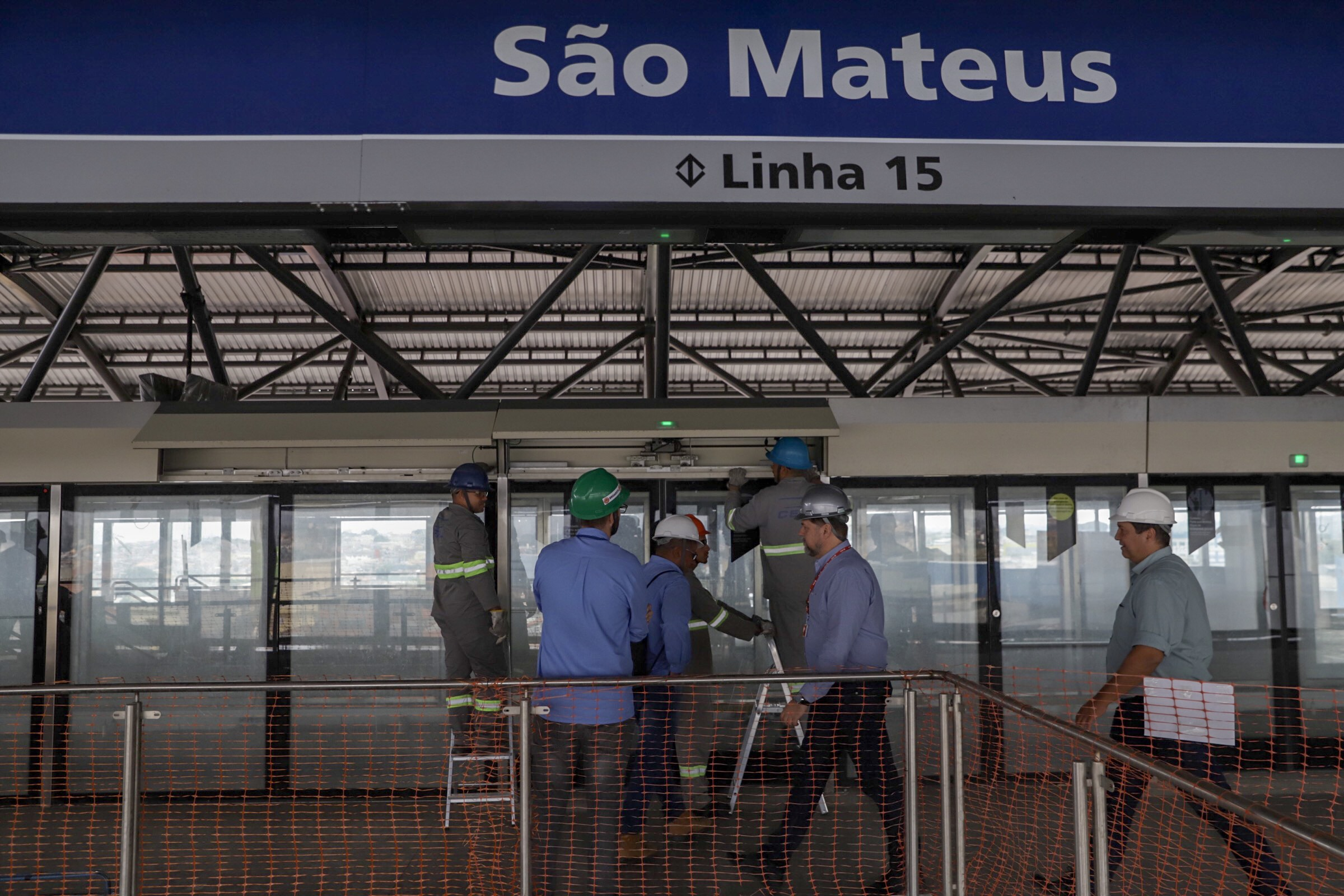

General information
- Location: Av. Sapopemba, 13542, São Mateus; São Paulo; Brazil
- Owner: Government of the State of São Paulo
- Operator: Companhia do Metropolitano de São Paulo
- Platforms: Island platforms
- Connections: São Mateus Metropolitan Terminal; São Mateus–Jabaquara Metropolitan Corridor; Metropolitan BRT East Perimetral (planned)

Construction
- Structure type: Elevated
- Accessible: y

Other information
- Station code: MAT

History
- Opened: 16 December 2019

Passengers
- 17,000/business day

Services
Preceding station	São Paulo Metro	Following station
Fazenda da Juta towards Vila Prudente	Line 15	Jardim Colonial towards Jacu-Pêssego
Track layout
Location

São Mateus is a monorail station of the São Paulo Metro in Brazil. It belongs to Line 15-Silver, which is currently in expansion, and should go to Cidade Tiradentes, connecting with Line 2-Green in Vila Prudente. It is located in Avenida Sapopemba, 13542.

It was first scheduled, according to the Expansion Plan of the Government of the State of São Paulo, to be opened in the first semester of 2020. Later, it was officially opened on 16 December 2019 along with stations Sapopemba and Fazenda da Juta.

== Station layout ==
P Platform level
P Platform level	Westbound	← toward Vila Prudente
P Platform level	Island platform, doors open on the left or right
P Platform level	Westbound	← toward Vila Prudente
P Platform level	Island platform, doors open on the left or right
P Platform level	Eastbound	toward Jardim Colonial →
M	Mezzanine	Fare control, ticket office, customer service, Bilhete Único/TOP recharge machines, transfer to São Mateus Bus Terminal
G	Street level	Exit/entrance
