= São Lucas =

District of São Paulo, Brazil

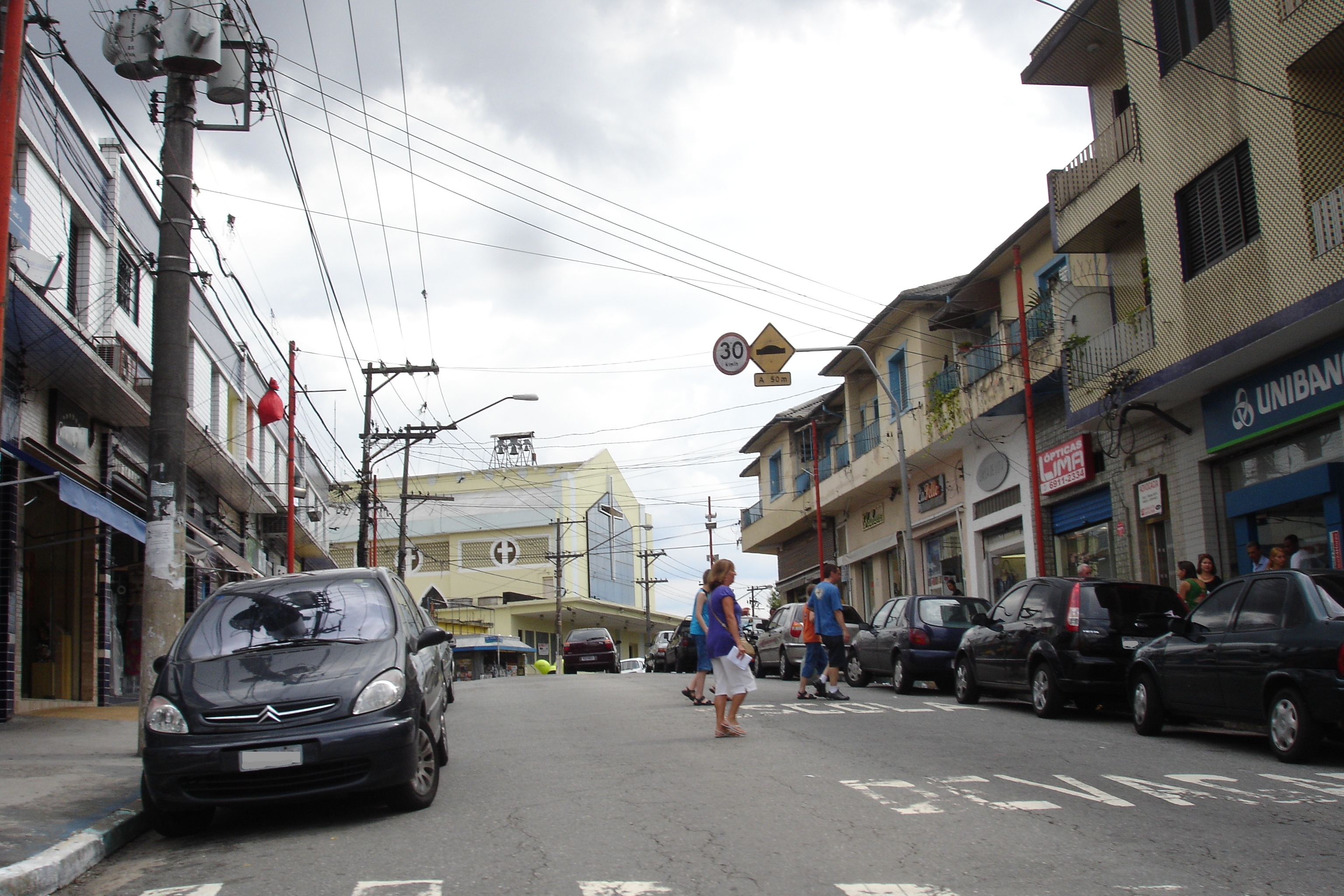
- A street in São Lucas

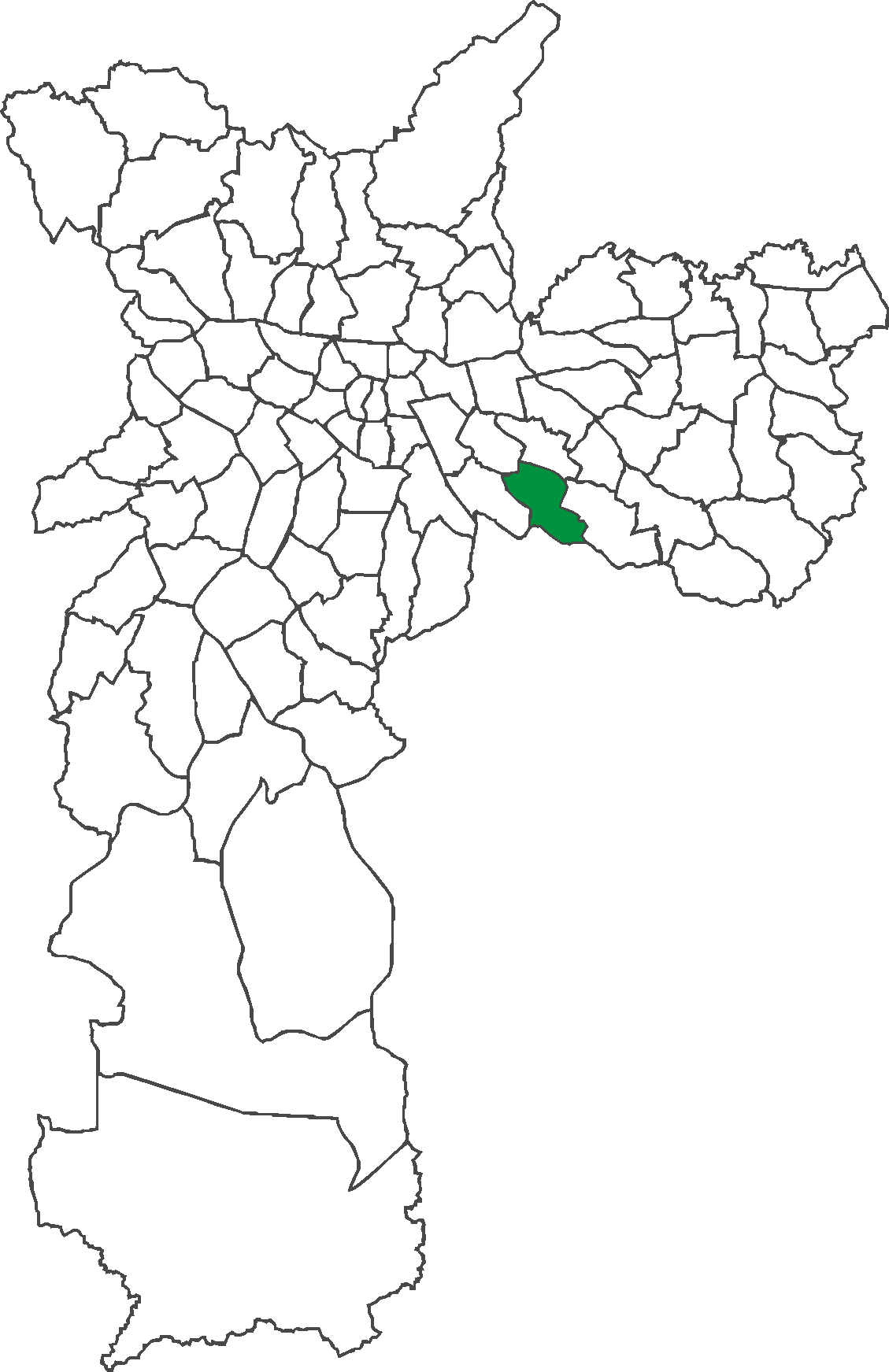
- Location in the city of São Paulo
- Country: Brazil
- State: São Paulo
- City: São Paulo

Government
  - Type: Subprefecture
  - Subprefect: Manoel Antônio da Silva Araujo

Area
  - Total: 9.67 km^{2} (3.73 sq mi)

Population (2008)
  - Total: 131.236
  - Density: 13,578.13/km^{2} (35,167.2/sq mi)
- HDI: 0,847 –high
- Website: Subprefecture of Vila Prudente

São Lucas is a district in the eastern part of the city of São Paulo, Brazil.
