= Sapopemba (district of São Paulo) =

District of São Paulo, Brazil

Coordinates: 23.575°S 46.524°W

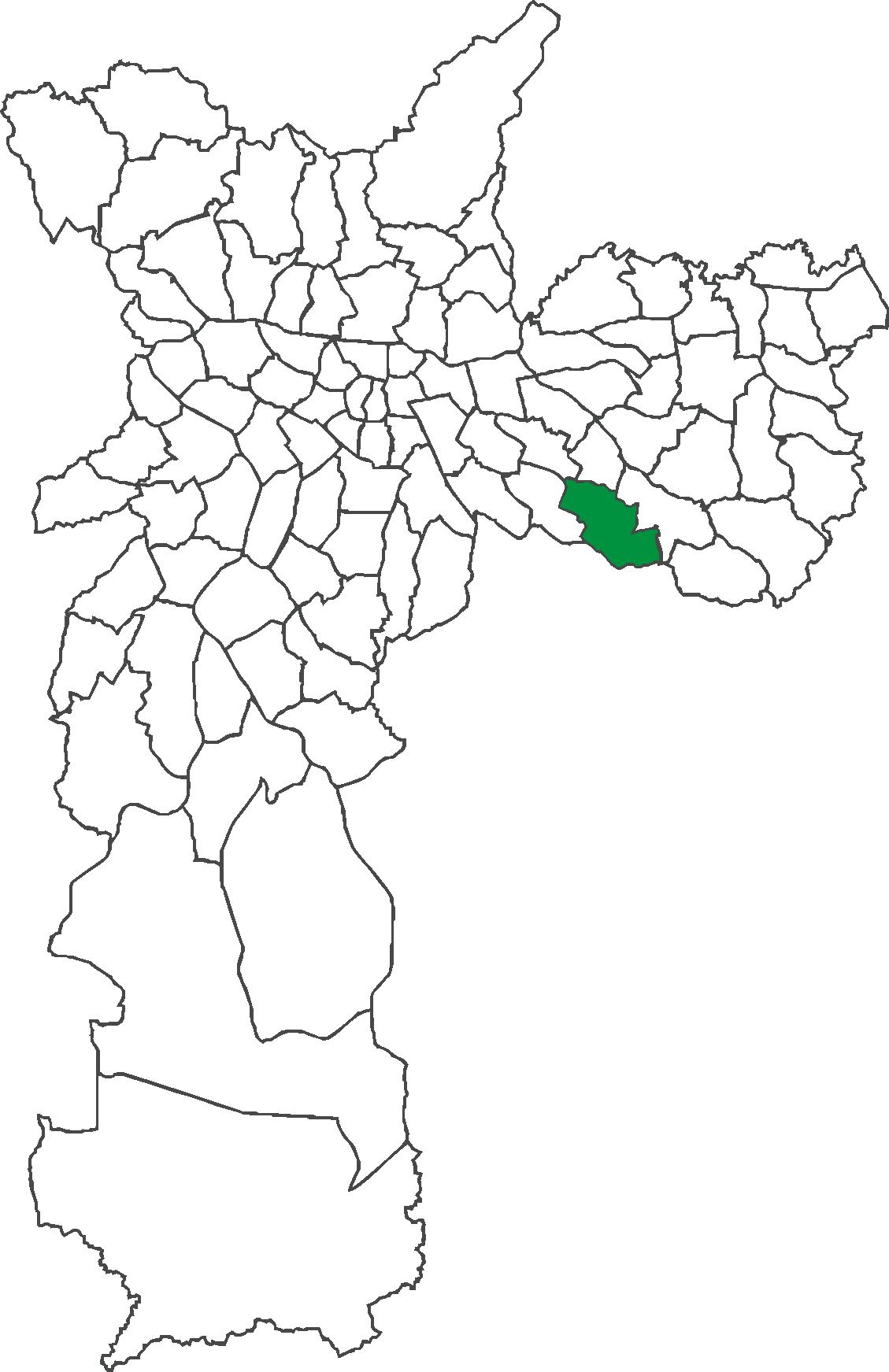
- District of the city of São Paulo
- Country: Brazil
- State: São Paulo
- Municipality: São Paulo
- Regional prefecture: Subprefecture of Sapopemba

Area
  - Total: 13.50 km^{2} (5.21 sq mi)

Population (2007)
  - Total: 284,524
  - Density: 21,076/km^{2} (54,590/sq mi)
- Website: Regional Prefecture of Sapopemba

Sapopemba is one of 96 districts in the city of São Paulo, Brazil.

Sapopemba is a district located in the southeastern part of the East Zone of the municipality of São Paulo, Brazil. It was created by State Law No. 4,954, of December 27, 1985, after a request presented to the Legislative Assembly of São Paulo in the same year.
