= Jacu-Pêssego (São Paulo Metro) =

Monorail station in São Paulo, Brazil

General information
- Location: Av. Ragueb Chohfi, 4383, Iguatemi; São Paulo; Brazil
- Owner: Government of the State of São Paulo
- Operator: Companhia do Metropolitano de São Paulo
- Platforms: Island platforms

Construction
- Structure type: Elevated
- Accessible: y

Other information
- Station code: JPS

History
- Opening: 2025 (estimated)

Services
Preceding station	São Paulo Metro	Following station
Boa Esperança towards Vila Prudente	Line 15	Terminus
Track layout
Location

Jacu-Pêssego is a future monorail station of São Paulo Metro. It will serve Line 15-Silver, which connects the nearby neighbourhood to the Metro Line 2-Green in Vila Prudente. It will be located at Avenida Ragueb Chohfi, 4383, next to a junction with Avenida Jacu-Pêssego.

The station is the last of the 3 kilometres (1.9 mi) expansion pack of this line.

== Station layout ==
P Platform level
P Platform level	Westbound	← toward Boa Esperança
P Platform level	Island platform, doors open on the left
P Platform level	Eastbound	toward Jardim Marilu →
M	Mezzanine	Fare control, ticket office, customer service, Bilhete Único/BOM recharge machines
G	Street level	Exit/entrance
