= Vila Prudente (São Paulo Metro) =

São Paulo Metro station

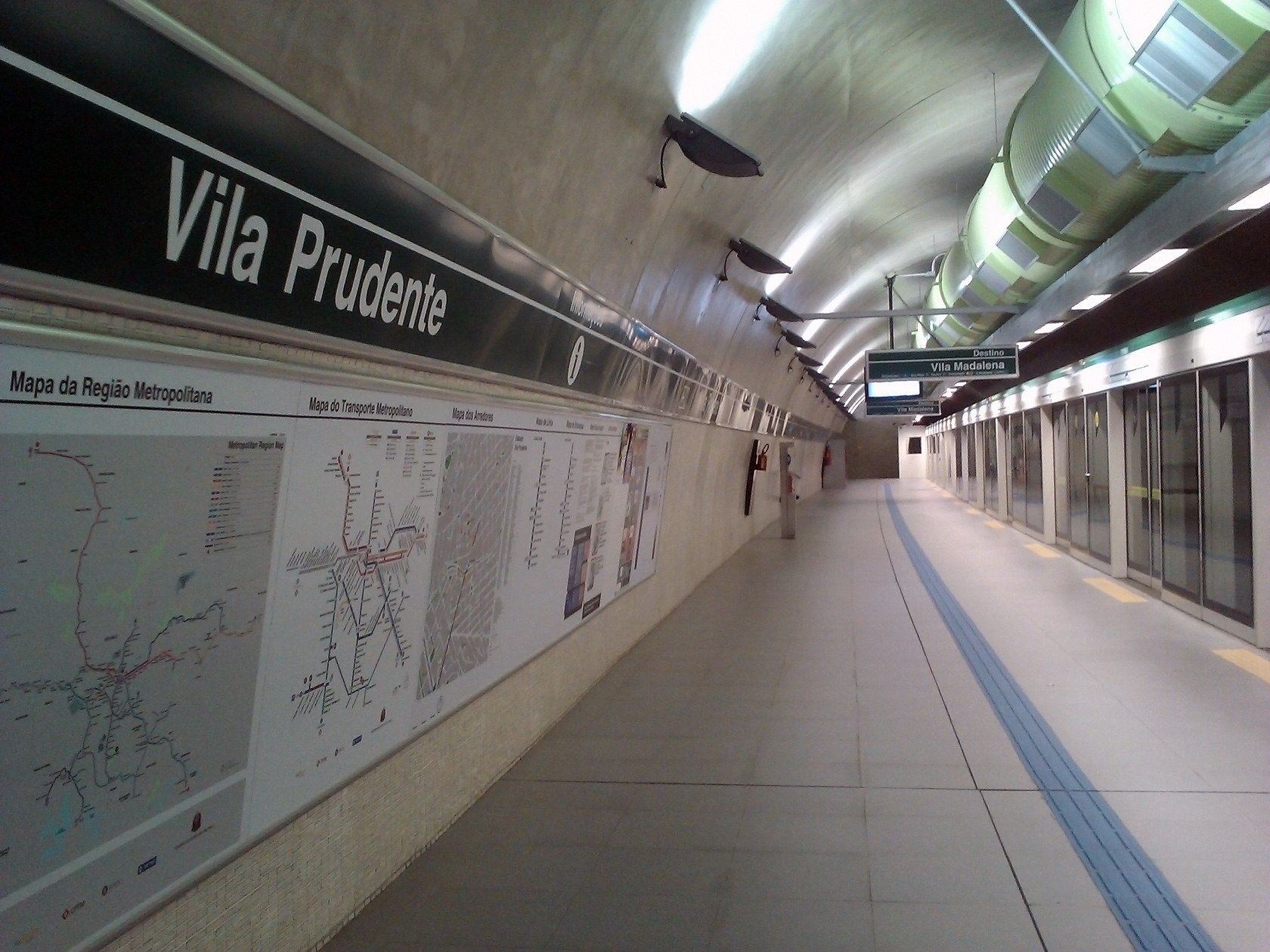
- Platform of the Vila Prudente station, Vila Prudente

General information
- Location: São Paulo; Brazil
- Coordinates: 23°35′04″S 46°34′55″W
- Owner: Government of the State of São Paulo
- Operator: Companhia do Metropolitano de São Paulo
- Platforms: Side platforms Island platform
- Connections: Vila Prudente Bus Terminal; Expresso Tiradentes

Construction
- Structure type: Underground; Elevated
- Accessible: Yes
- Architect: Luiz Carlos Esteves

Other information
- Station code: VPT; VPM

History
- Opened: August 21, 2010; 16 years ago August 30, 2014; 11 years ago

Passengers
- 75,000/business day 57,000/business day

Services
Preceding station	São Paulo Metro	Following station
Tamanduateí towards Vila Madalena	Line 2	Orfanato towards Penha
Terminus	Line 15	Oratório towards Jacu-Pêssego
Track layout
Line 2
Line 15
Location

Vila Prudente is a station on Line 2-Green and Line 15-Silver of the São Paulo Metro and is the terminus. There are plans to integrate the station with Expresso Tiradentes Line 2 (a bus rapid transit system). The Vila Prudente Bus Terminal is also nearby.

== Metro stations ==
It was scheduled to open in March 2010, but delays in the constructions prevented the opening, that became unknown until being scheduled, with three days in advance, to 21 August 2010. The passenger boarding, however, began only two days later, on Monday. In this first day of supervised operation, 7,400 passengers were transported in six hours, and more than 100 people crowded that station's entrance before it opened at 9:30 a.m. There were setbacks: in the first trip, the platform screen doors didn't open immediately in Sacomã station, problem solved quickly; and, the largest failure, there were misalignment of the train doors with the station doors, decreasing the space to leave the vehicles.

During the first week, the supervised operation time was from 9:30 a.m. to 3 p.m.; from the second week and on, the time was expanded until 4 p.m. With the opening of Tamanduateí station, it worked Mon-Fri, from 9:00 a.m. to 4:00 p.m., time expanded to between 8:30 a.m. and 5 p.m. since 30 September 2010 and between 8 a.m. and 5 p.m. since 5 February 2011, when began the bill of the fare. Besides it, the station was kept in supervised operation. The time was extended again on 19 March 2011, from 4:40 a.m. to 9 p.m. According to the Metro, the time was not extended until midnight because there were 300 hours of tests to be executed in the signaling system.

Local residents who talked to Jornal da Tarde in April 2011 complained about a supposed increased of criminality in the surroundings of the station, as criminals were being attracted by the Metro users' cars parked in the region. "We didn't have this thing here", complained one of them. "It was a very calm region." The Military Police, however, said they didn't notice significant increase in the number of incidents.

Since 12 September 2011, the time was extended until midnight, same time as the other Metro stations. The expectation was that the 3 additional hours would increase in 2% the number of the line passengers.

On 30 August 2014, the station of the Line 15–Silver was opened, with the extension of the working time and connection with Line 2–Green on 20 December.

== Station layout ==
P Platform level
P Platform level	Eastbound	toward Jardim Colonial →
P Platform level	Island platform, doors open on the left or right
P Platform level	Eastbound	toward Jardim Colonial →
M	Mezzanine	Fare control, ticket office, customer service, Bilhete Único/TOP recharge machines, transfer between Lines and
G	Street level	Exit/entrance
M1	Mezzanine level 1	Fare control, ticket office, customer service, Bilhete Único/TOP recharge machines
M2	Mezzanine level 2	Transfer between Lines and
P Platform level
P Platform level	Side platform, doors open on the left
P Platform level	Northbound	← toward Vila Madalena
P Platform level	Northbound	← toward Vila Madalena
P Platform level	Side platform, doors open on the right

== Bus terminal ==
Terminal Vila Prudente
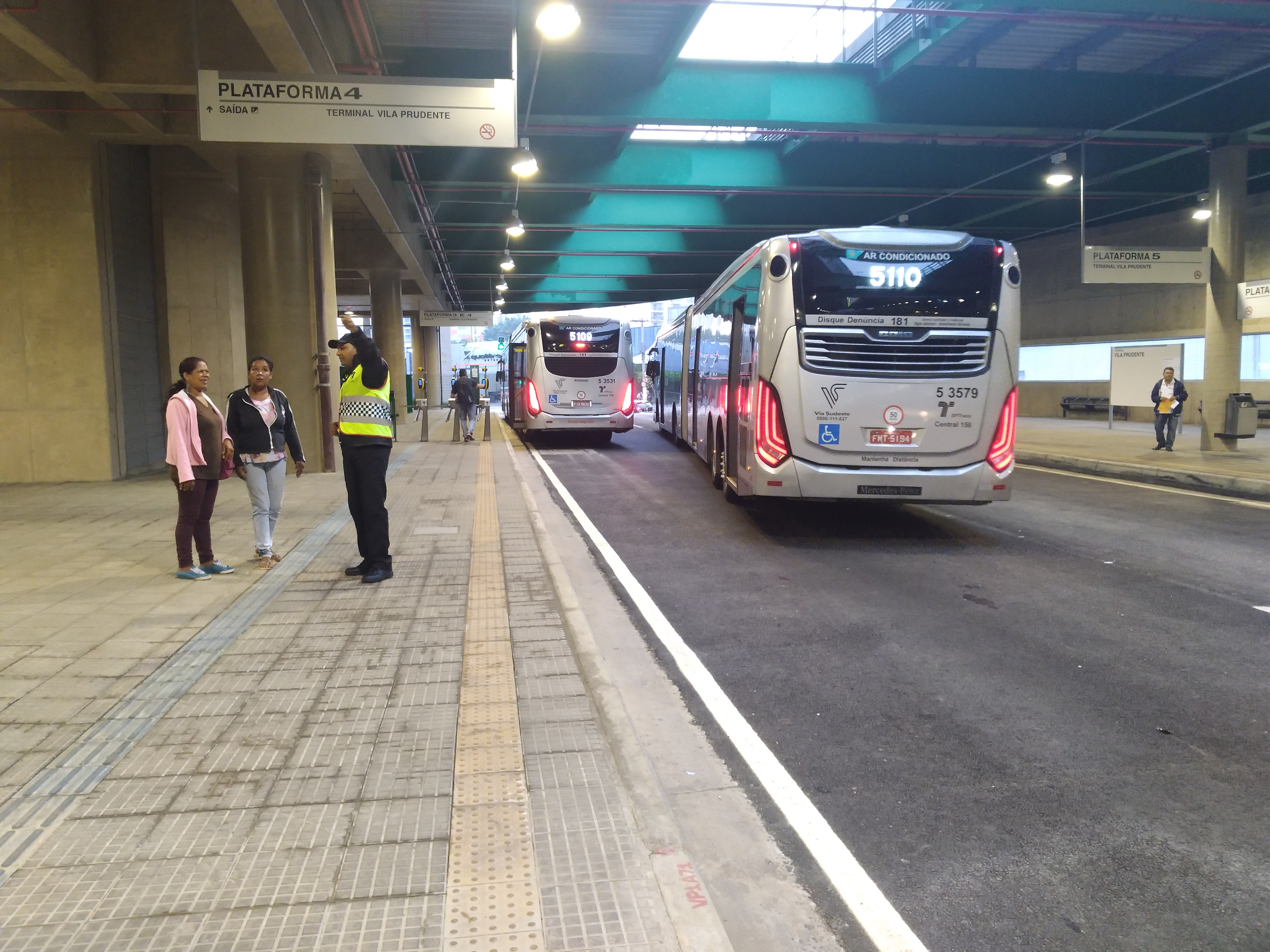

General information
- Owner: Prefecture of São Paulo
- Operator: SPTrans
- Bus routes: 48
- Bus operators: SPTrans
- Connections: Line 2 (São Paulo Metro) Line 15 (São Paulo Metro)

History
- Opened: 31 March 1980 (1st North Terminal); September 2017 (2nd North Terminal); 4 August 2018 (South Terminal); 20 May 2019 (Central Terminal)
- Closed: 23 March 2013 (1st North Terminal)
Track layout
Location

The Vila Prudente Terminal is a bus terminal in the city of São Paulo. Part of the project SISTRAN (network of 280 km of trolleybuses) of the City Hall of São Paulo, was one of the first bus terminals of the city, opened on 31 March 1980, along with Paes de Barros Corridor, first of the city.

The first terminal was composed of light structures pre-molded of concrete with aluminium roof tiles and was supposed to connected trolleybuses lines with buses moved by diesel. With the construction of the Vila Prudente station, the terminal was demolished on 23 March 2013, and a new temporary terminal was built in the surroundings.

The current terminal was project by architect Luiz Carlos Esteves in 2008, originally as terminal of the BRT Expresso Tiradentes. After that, his project was adapted to connect with terminals of lines 2–Green and 15–Silver of the Metro.

The first phase of the terminal was opened, under criticism, in September 2017. The second part of the terminal (central and south structures, under the monorail station) was opened to the population on 11 May 2019, and officially inaugurated on 20 May 2019.

=== North Terminal ===
==== Platform 1 ====
Line #	Destination
2101–10	Pça. Silvio Romero
3160–10	Term. Pq. D. Pedro II

=== Central Terminal ===
==== Platform 2 ====
Line #	Destination
364A–10	Hosp. Ipiranga
373T–10	Metrô Bresser
514T–10	Term. Sacomã
575C–10	Ipiranga
3021–10	Pq. Bancário
5142–10	Term. Pq. D. Pedro II
N501–11	Term. Pq. D. Pedro II
N536–11	Term. Sacomã

==== Platform 3 ====
Line #	Destination
550P–10	Metrô Brás
5110–10	Term. Mercado
5110–21	Term. Mercado
5110–23	Term. Mercado
5110–24	São Mateus
5110–41	Metrô Tamanduateí
5143–10	Term. Pq. D. Pedro II

==== Platform 4 ====
Line #	Destination
5109–10	Term. Mercado
5110–10	Term. São Mateus
5110–41	São Mateus
5143–10	Term. Sapopemba

==== Platform 5 ====
Line #	Destination
364A–10	Shop. Aricanduva
373T–10	Jd. Itápolis
407Y–10	Pq. Savoy City
476G–10	Jd. Elba
476G–21	Jd. Elba
476G–41	Vl. Industrial
514T–10	Conj. Teotônio Vilela
573A–10	Vl. Alpina
575A–10	Div. São Caetano
575C–10	Vl. Matias
3024–10	Vl. Industrial
4288–10	Pq. Sta. Madalena
5142–10	Term. Sapopemba
N501–11	Term. São Mateus
N504–11	Term. Pq. D. Pedro II
N507–11	Metrô Santana
N531–11	Term. Sapopemba
N533–11	Jd. Planalto
N536–11	Jd. Itápolis
N537–11	Metrô Vl. Mariana

=== South Terminal ===
==== Platform 6 ====
Line #	Destination
4029–10	São Mateus
4284–10	Vl. Califórnia
4286–10	Vl. Industrial
4288–10	Term. Pq. D. Pedro II
