= Companhia do Metropolitano de São Paulo =

Mixed-economy company in Brazil

Overview
- Main region: Greater São Paulo
- Fleet: 66 Alstom E stock (11 trains); 96 Alstom G stock (16 trains); 102 CAF H stock (17 trains); 150 Alstom/Siemens I stock (25 trains); 156 Bombardier/Tejofran/Temoins J stock (26 trains); 150 T'Trans/MPE/Temoinsa K stock (25 trains); 132 Alstom/IESA L stock (22 trains); 150 Bombardier Innovia 300 M stock (25 trains); 133 CRRC Innovia 300 S stock (19 trains)
- Stations called at: 66
- Parent company: State Secretariat of Metropolitan Transport
- Headquarters: São Paulo
- Key people: Júlio Castiglioni (Chairman)
- Dates of operation: 24 April 1968–present

Technical
- Track gauge: 1,600 mm (5 ft 3 in) (Lines 1–3); 680 mm (2 ft 3 in) (Line 15)
- Electrification: 750 V DC third rail
- Length: 51.7 km (32.1 mi)
- Operating speed: 80 km/h (50 mph)

Other
- Website: www.metro.sp.gov.br

Companhia do Metropolitano de São Paulo (CMSP) is a mixed economy company based in São Paulo, Brazil. The majority of its assets are owned by the São Paulo state government. Established by the City of São Paulo on April 24, 1968, the company's mandate encompasses the development, project planning, construction, and operation of the metropolitan transport system in Greater São Paulo, with a specific focus on the capital's metro network. As a state-controlled entity, CMSP operates under the oversight of the Secretariat of Metropolitan Transports of the State of São Paulo. The current state administration has expressed its intention to fully privatize Greater São Paulo's rail transport network, including CMSP and CPTM, by 2024.

The company is member of the National Association of Passenger Carriers on Rails (ANPTrilhos).

== Network ==
CMSP currently owns and operates 4 lines out of 6 of the São Paulo Metro:

Line	Color	Termini	Opened	Length	Stations	Duration of trip (min)	Hours of Operation
Line 1	Blue	Tucuruvi ↔ Jabaquara-Comitê Paralímpico Brasileiro	September 14, 1974	20.2 km (12.6 mi)	23	39	Daily (4:40 AM–0:32 AM)
Line 2	Green	Vila Madalena ↔ Vila Prudente	January 25, 1991	14.7 km (9.1 mi)	14	26	Daily (4:40 AM–0:32 AM)
Line 3	Red	Palmeiras-Barra Funda ↔ Corinthians-Itaquera	March 10, 1979	22.0 km (13.7 mi)	18	34	Daily (4:40 AM–0:32 AM)
Line 15	Silver (Monorail)	Vila Prudente ↔ Jardim Colonial	August 30, 2014	14.7 km (9.1 mi)	11	21	Daily (4:40 AM–0:32 AM)

== Evolution of the share control ==
Shareholders	1968	1978	1988	2018	2024
City of São Paulo	76.94% (Finances); 0.10% (CMTC)	48.21%	8.4%	2.94%	2.00%
State of São Paulo	20% (Finances)	12.39% (Finances); 27.57% (EMTU)	82.9% (Finances); 5% (Emplasa)	97.02% (Finances); 0.01% (CPOS); 0.01% (Emplasa)	97.99%
Federal Government	0%	11.74% (EBTU)	3.7% (EBTU)	0.02% (BNDESPAR)	0.01% (BNDES)
Others (private initiative)	2.96%	0.09%	0%	0%	0%
Total	100%	100%	100%	100%	100%

== See also ==
- Motiva Linha 4
- ViaMobilidade
