= Avenida Ipiranga =

Avenue in São Paulo

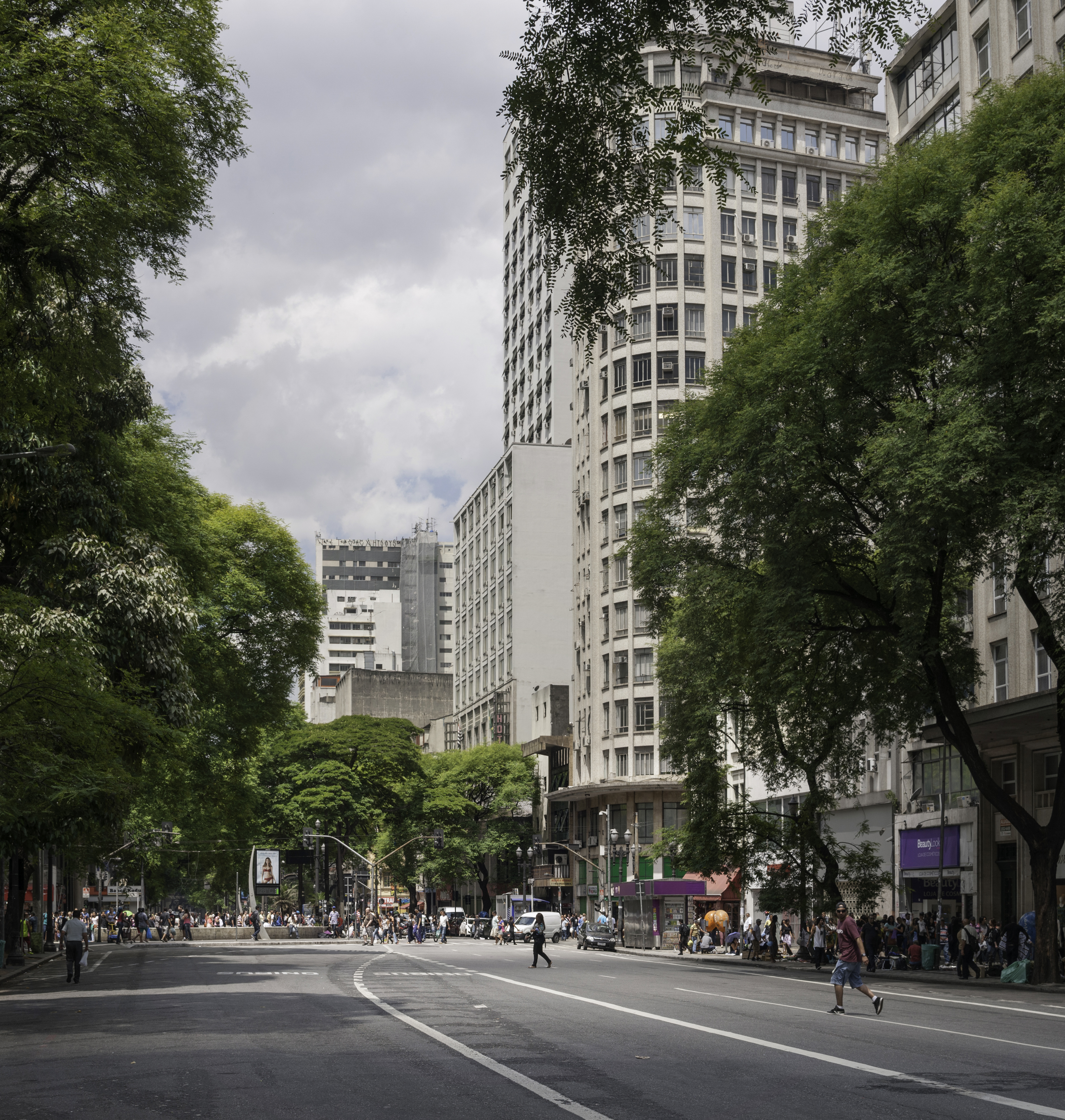
- View of Avenida Ipiranga.
- Interactive map of Avenida Ipiranga
- Former names: Beco do Mata-Fome, Beco dos Curros
- Type: Avenue
- Length: approximately 1.3 km
- Location: São Paulo, São Paulo, Brazil
- Quarter: República
- From: Consolação Street
- To: Cásper Líbero avenue

Avenida Ipiranga is an avenue in the República, central region of São Paulo. The stretch of avenue runs from the junction with Consolação Street to the junction with Cásper Líbero avenue.

== History ==
The street originated from the merging of two 'alleys' in old São Paulo. One of them was the 'Beco do Mata-Fome' (which would today correspond to parts of Araújo and Consolação streets), a passage used by cattle herders and their livestock on the way to the slaughterhouse located in the Liberdade district, dating back to the late 18th century. The second was the 'Beco dos Curros,' near what is now Praça da República.

In 1865, the Municipal Chamber of São Paulo decided to open a new street and so Rua Ipiranga was born, a name chosen because at the same time a project to build a monument in honor of Brazil's Independence had begun. Ipiranga is a word of Tupi-Guarani origin, meaning 'Red River,' as the stream's waters were muddy. In 1934 it was renamed an avenue and is today one of the main thoroughfares in the Central Zone of São Paulo.

Today it still houses the Hotel Excelsior, built between 1941 and 1943, designed by Rino Levi, a highlight on Avenida Ipiranga, as well as the former Hotel Terminus, which had famous guests and residents. Between 1949 and 1978, São Paulo FC maintained its administrative and social headquarters on three floors of building No. 1267.

The Municipal Council for the Preservation of the Historical, Cultural and Environmental Heritage of the City of São Paulo (Conpresp) has listed the interior of the traditional Cine Ipiranga, located on the avenue. The cinema was founded in 1943 and lived through the great moments of the street cinemas in the central region.

The avenue is currently home to symbols and postcards of the city, such as Praça da República, Edifício Copan, Edifício Itália, among others important places in São Paulo's history and present day.

=== Relevant crossings ===
- Avenida São João
- Consolação Street
- Avenida Rio Branco
- Major Sertório Street

=== Relevant places ===
- Praça da República
- Edifício Copan
- Edifício Itália
- Bar Brahma
- Cine Marabá

== Tributes ==
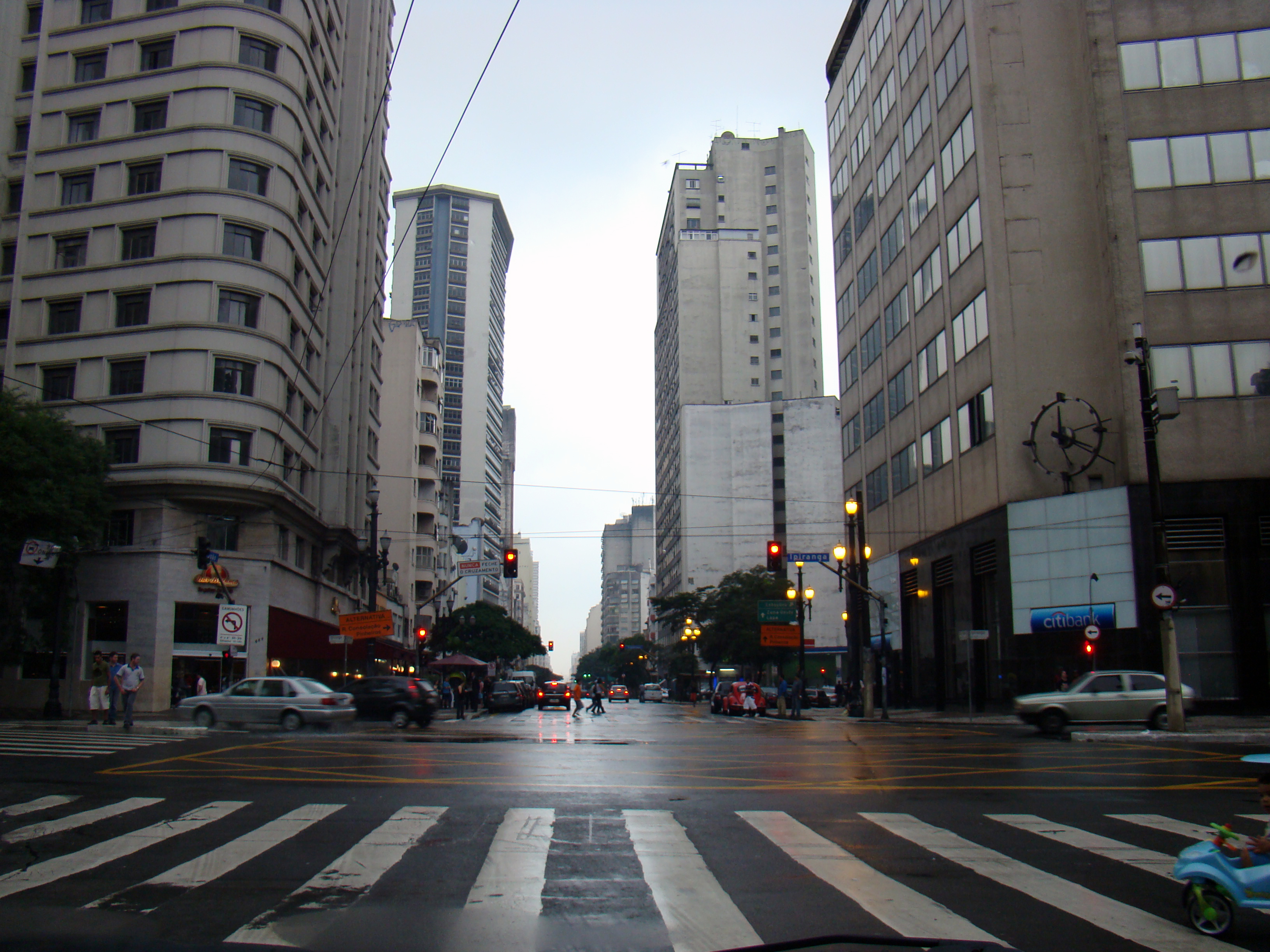
Intersection of Avenida São João with Avenida Ipiranga, immortalized in the song "Sampa" by Caetano Veloso.

In December 2022, renovations were carried out at the intersection of Avenida Ipiranga and São João, with the placement of statues in honor of the representatives of São Paulo samba, Adoniran Barbosa and Paulo Vanzolini.

The intersection of Avenida Ipiranga and Avenida São João is featured in Caetano Veloso's iconic song Sampa, a tribute by the Bahian singer to the city of São Paulo. Released in 1978, the song reflects Veloso's experience and impressions of the city, capturing its essence through vivid lyrical imagery. At the same intersection is Bar Brahma, a traditional São Paulo bar founded in the 1940s.

== Bibliography ==
- GAMA, Lúcia Helena. Eram a consolação: sociabilidade e cultura em São Paulo nos anos 1960 e 1970; São Paulo: Edições SESC, 2023.
- TOLEDO, Benedito Lima de; São Paulo: três cidades em um século; São Paulo: Cosac e Naify, 2004.
