= Eiffel Building =

- Edifício Eiffel
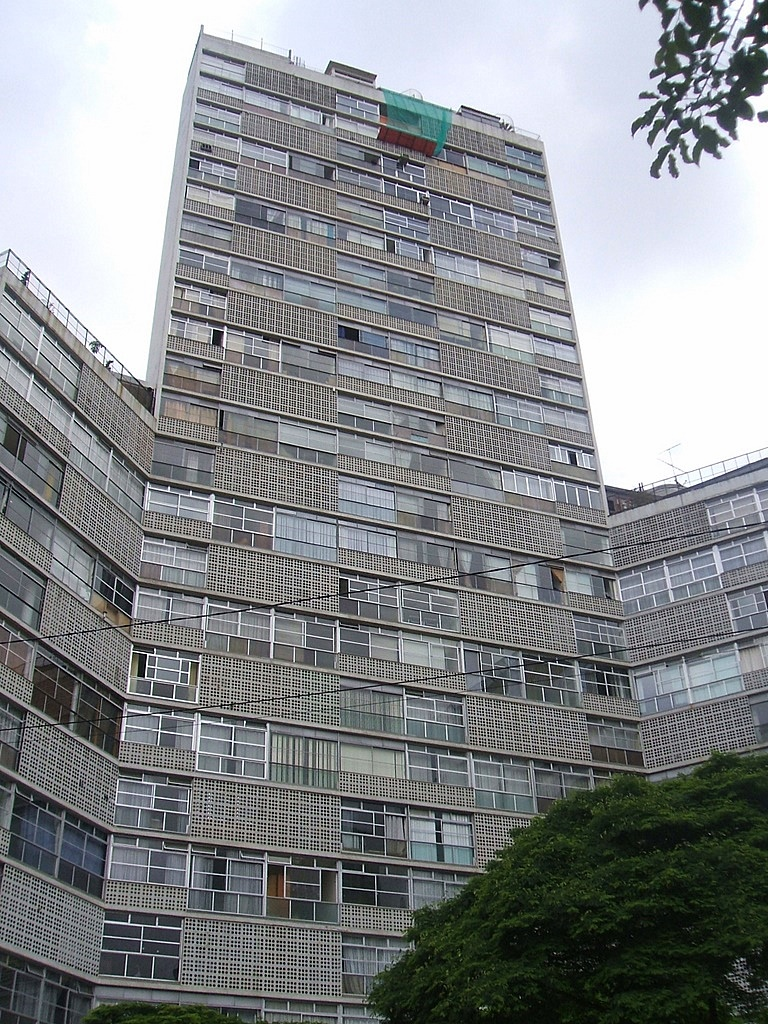
- Façade of Eiffel Building facing Praça da República

- Location within São Paulo Location within Brazil

General information
- Architectural style: Modernist
- Location: Praça da República 177, República, São Paulo
- Coordinates: 23.544184°S 46.644660°W
- Groundbreaking: 1953
- Opened: 1956

Technical details
- Floor count: 23

Design and construction
- Architects: Oscar Niemeyer, Carlos Lemos

Other information
- Number of rooms: 54

The Eiffel Building (Portuguese: Edifício Eiffel) is a mixed-use building in the República district of São Paulo, Brazil. It was designed by the architect Oscar Niemeyer (1907–2012) and sits on the southwestern of Praça da República, the Square of the Republic. The building was designed in 1953 and completed in 1956. The Eiffel Building is a Brazilian example of the Cartesian skyscraper, a building type developed by Le Corbusier.
