= Largo do Arouche =

Region in São Paulo, Brazil

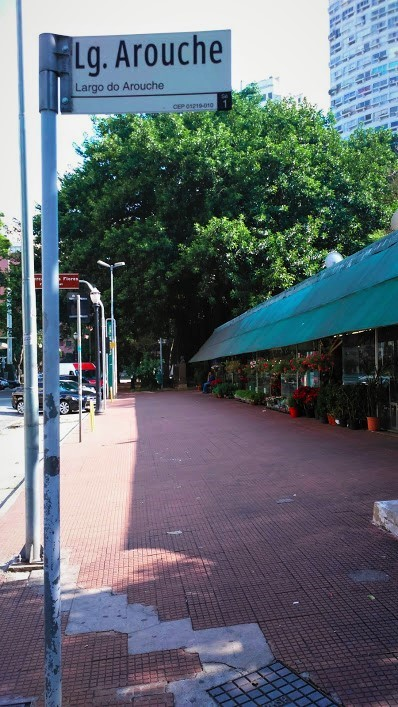
- View of the area.

- Location within São Paulo Location within Brazil
- Location: São Paulo, São Paulo; Brazil
- Coordinates: 23°32′27″S 46°38′47″W

Largo do Arouche, also known as Flower Square (Portuguese: Praça das Flores) or Flower Market (Mercado das Flores), is located in the República district, in the central region of the Brazilian city of São Paulo. It represents a center of diversity, as it has been occupied by LGBTQIAP+ social groups since the 1940s, an occupation that resisted the military dictatorship in the fight for the right to sexual and gender diversity.

It houses several florists who set up shop after the existing stalls in República Square were removed by Mayor Armando de Arruda Pereira around 1914. During the 1900s, it housed the Arouche Free Fair, which was created during the crisis in the supply of fruit and vegetable products and closed in 1954. The current name refers to Lieutenant General José Arouche de Toledo Rendon, the first director of the Law School of the University of São Paulo and the Botanical Garden. It has been called Largo do Ouvidor, Largo da Artilharia and Alexandre Herculano Square.

The place became nationally known after the sitcom Sai de Baixo, produced by TV Globo, was launched. The series, shown between 1996 and 2002, portrayed humorous situations that took place in a fictitious building located in Largo do Arouche.

== History ==
Around 1820, Largo do Arouche served as a military exercise ground that stretched as far as the current República Square. It is named after Lieutenant General José Arouche de Toledo Rendon, who owned a large part of the central area of the city of São Paulo, which included the current Largo do Arouche and República Square. In 1881, following Arouche's request, the São Paulo City Council agreed to clear and flatten the area in order to "discipline the militiamen by brigades" and change its name to Milicianos Square.

The space between the streets Jaguaribe and Arouche, considered the lower part, received several names, such as da Alegria Square and Legião Square. In 1865, it was renamed Campo do Arouche, which lasted until 1910, when Municipal Law No. 1,312 changed it to Alexandre Herculano Square. Three years later, Largo do Arouche became the definitive name for the whole area. In 1953, it was called the Arouche Flower Market. The upper part, formerly the Artillery Square, also changed its name to Largo do Arouche. It is composed of Jaguaribe, Amaral Gurgel and Arouche streets, and Duque de Caxias Avenue. On the opposite side is Vieira de Carvalho Avenue.

=== LGBTQIA+ stronghold ===
The area is mainly known for the presence of the LGBTQIA+ community, including nightclubs, stores, social centers and meeting points for meetings and events. According to the archives of the Caneca de Prata Bar, Largo do Arouche began to be frequented by city executives around the 1940s who were looking for more discreet places to meet men. The bar, founded in 1960, is frequented by LGBT+ people and is considered by important media outlets to be a symbol of resistance in favor of diversity.

In addition to the Caneca de Prata, there was the Freedom Nightclub and other bohemian places that became strongholds during the military dictatorship. During police raids, in which LGBT people were arrested for being who they were, these establishments sheltered the individuals until the police left the place.

In the 1980s, Largo do Arouche was the scene of a crackdown on transvestites who circulated in the area on the grounds of fighting AIDS. The action, undertaken by the police, was called Operation Tarantula. On June 28, 2015, seven flags were installed in honor of LGBT Pride Day. Later that year, the São Paulo City Hall, as part of the actions of the Management Goals Program, installed the LGBT Citizenship Center on Arouche Street.

=== Revitalization ===
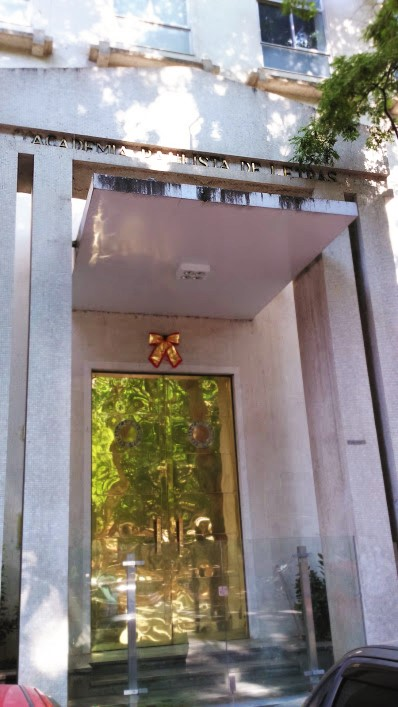
Headquarters of the São Paulo Academy of Letters.

In May 2019, São Paulo City Hall began work on revitalizing Largo do Arouche, which included paving and leveling the floor, and installing new benches, drinking fountains and new lampposts. There were also plans to build kiosks and a vegetable garden. The change worried the Public Prosecutor's Office, which managed to halt the work pointing out a possible de-characterization of the site. The project was revised and the work was subsequently cleared, as there was no risk of environmental or urban damage. Largo do Arouche was reopened in March 2020.

=== Historic buildings ===
The site houses important sculptures by renowned artists, such as: The Girl and the Calf, a work by sculptor Luís Christophe, commissioned by Mayor Raimundo Duprat; the bust of Afonso d'Escragnolle Taunay, one of Brazil's greatest historians, designed by artist Claude Dunin; and Maternal Love, a sculpture featuring a dog and her puppy made by Frenchman Louis Eugéne Virion and acquired in the 1910s. The São Paulo Academy of Letters, based in Largo do Arouche, honored the immortal Aureliano Leite with a bust made by Luís Morrone in the area inaugurated in 1979, two years after his death.

In addition to political resistance and festivities, Largo do Arouche is also a stronghold for thrift stores, known for providing access to fashion at lower prices than the big stores.

== See also ==
- Tourism in the city of São Paulo
- Largo São Bento
- Largo de São Francisco
