= Anchieta building =

Building in São Paulo

- Edifício Anchieta
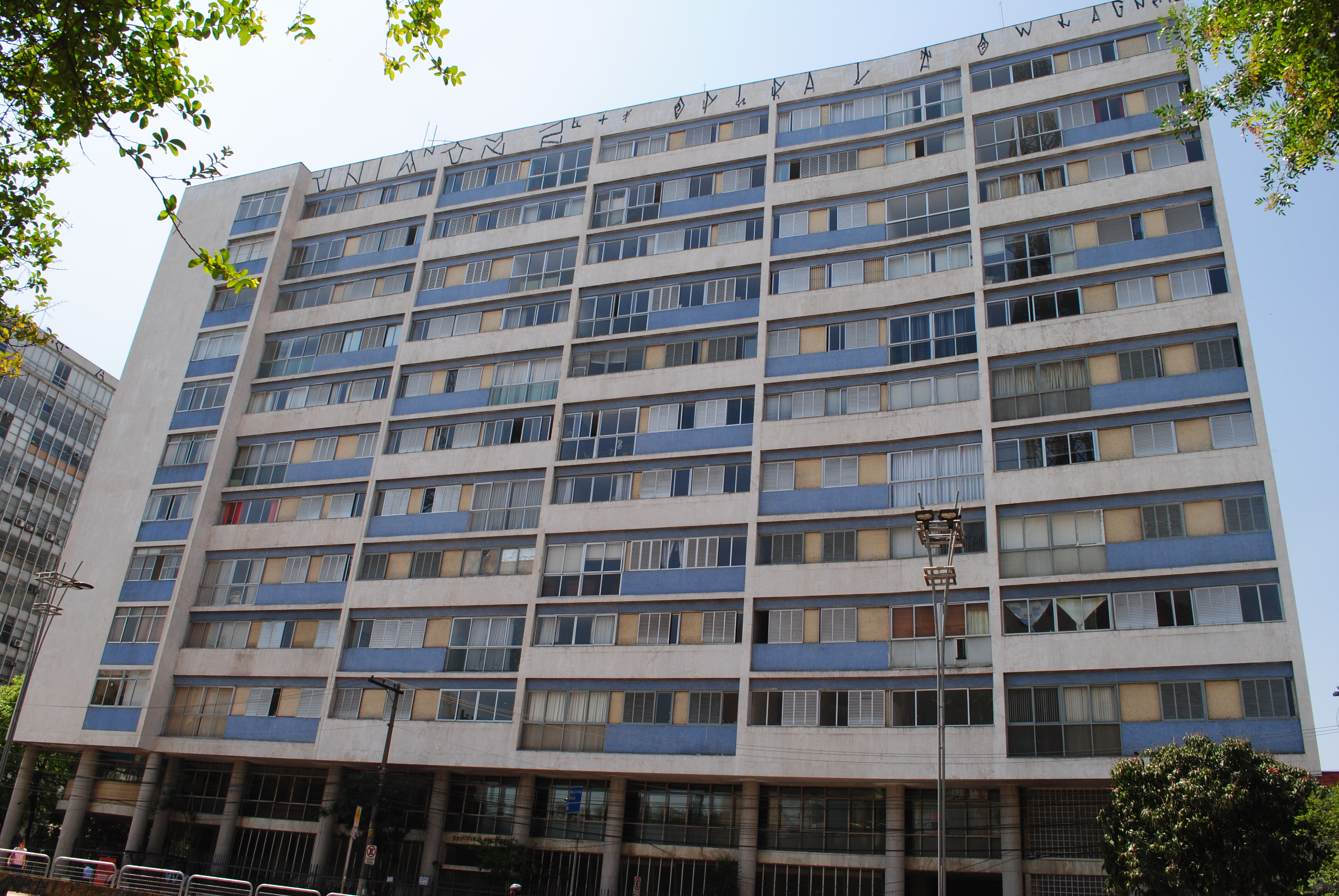
- View of the façade on Avenida Paulista.

- Location within São Paulo Altino Arantes Building (Brazil)

General information
- Type: Residencial and commercial
- Architectural style: Modern architecture
- Location: São Paulo, Brazil, 2584, Paulista Avenue - Bela Vista
- Coordinates: 23°33′19″S 46°39′047″W
- Inaugurated: 1941

Dimensions
- Other dimensions: Total built area: 12331.38 m²

Technical details
- Floor count: 10
- Floor area: 2,970.60 m^{2} (31,975.3 sq ft)

Design and construction
- Architects: Marcelo Roberto; Milton Roberto; Maurício Roberto

The Anchieta Building (Portuguese: Edifício Anchieta) is located in the Consolação neighborhood, on the corner of Paulista Avenue, Consolação Street and Angélica Avenue, in the city of São Paulo. Designed in 1941 by the architecture office MMM Roberto (architects Marcelo, Milton, and Maurício Roberto brothers), notable for his contributions to Brazilian Modern Architecture, the Anchieta building was constructed in 1941. It is part of the vertical housing concept that was becoming more common in the central areas of the city, with design focused on functionality and efficiency, features often associated with modern architecture.

The building has 60 apartments, 12 duplexes, a front garden, and colored tiles. It was financed and designed aiming to house employees of the Institute of Retirement and Pensions for Industrial Workers (Instituto de Aposentadorias e Pensões dos Industriários — IAPI). With a total floor area of 2970.60 m² and a constructed area of 12331.38 m², the building consists of a first floor, a superstore, as well as 10 terraces and a garden.

Anchieta was originally supposed to be divided between residential, commercial, and service uses, but it is currently only used for residential and commercial purposes. The building also contains the Riviera Bar.

Currently, the building is in the process of being listed by Municipal Council for the Preservation of the Historical, Cultural and Environmental Heritage of the City of São Paulo (Conselho Municipal de Preservação do Patrimônio Histórico, Cultural e Ambiental da Cidade de São Paulo - CONPRESP) and is included in the Strategic Regional Plan of the city's Sub-prefectures, the Special Cultural Preservation Zone (Zona Especial de Preservação Cultural – ZEPEC).

== History ==
The Anchieta building was commissioned and financed by the IAPI to provide housing, initially aimed at industrial workers. Later, it was managed by senior members of the institute until 1963, when President Jânio Quadros decreed the end of IAPI. From then on, the administration of the building was transferred to the National Social Security Institute (Instituto Nacional do Seguro Social - INSS), which sold the apartments.

During the 1970s, the building underwent a structural alteration. As part of the project to widen Paulista Ave. by 20 meters, authorized by Law 7,166 of July 17, 1968, the building's garden facing the Avenue was removed. Another modification involved the alteration of the two-vehicle entrances, which had previously been oriented towards Angélica Ave. and Consolação St. With the project to widen Consolação St., and the construction of the underground pedestrian gallery, also known as the Passagem Literária da Consolação, the access was altered, and only the exit onto Angélica Ave. remained.

== MMM Roberto architecture office ==
The architecture firm MMM Roberto, associated with Brazilian Modern Architecture, was founded in 1935 in Rio de Janeiro by the brothers Marcelo (1908-1964), and Milton (1914-1956), and later joined by their brother Maurício Roberto (1921-1996). Between 1935 and 1996, the firm was referred to by three different names. Founded in 1935, it was named MM Roberto, by combining the names Marcelo and Milton. In 1941, when Maurício joined the team, the firm was renamed MMM Roberto. After Marcelo and Milton's death, in 1964, Maurício renamed the company M Roberto Empreendimentos de Arquitetura Ltda.

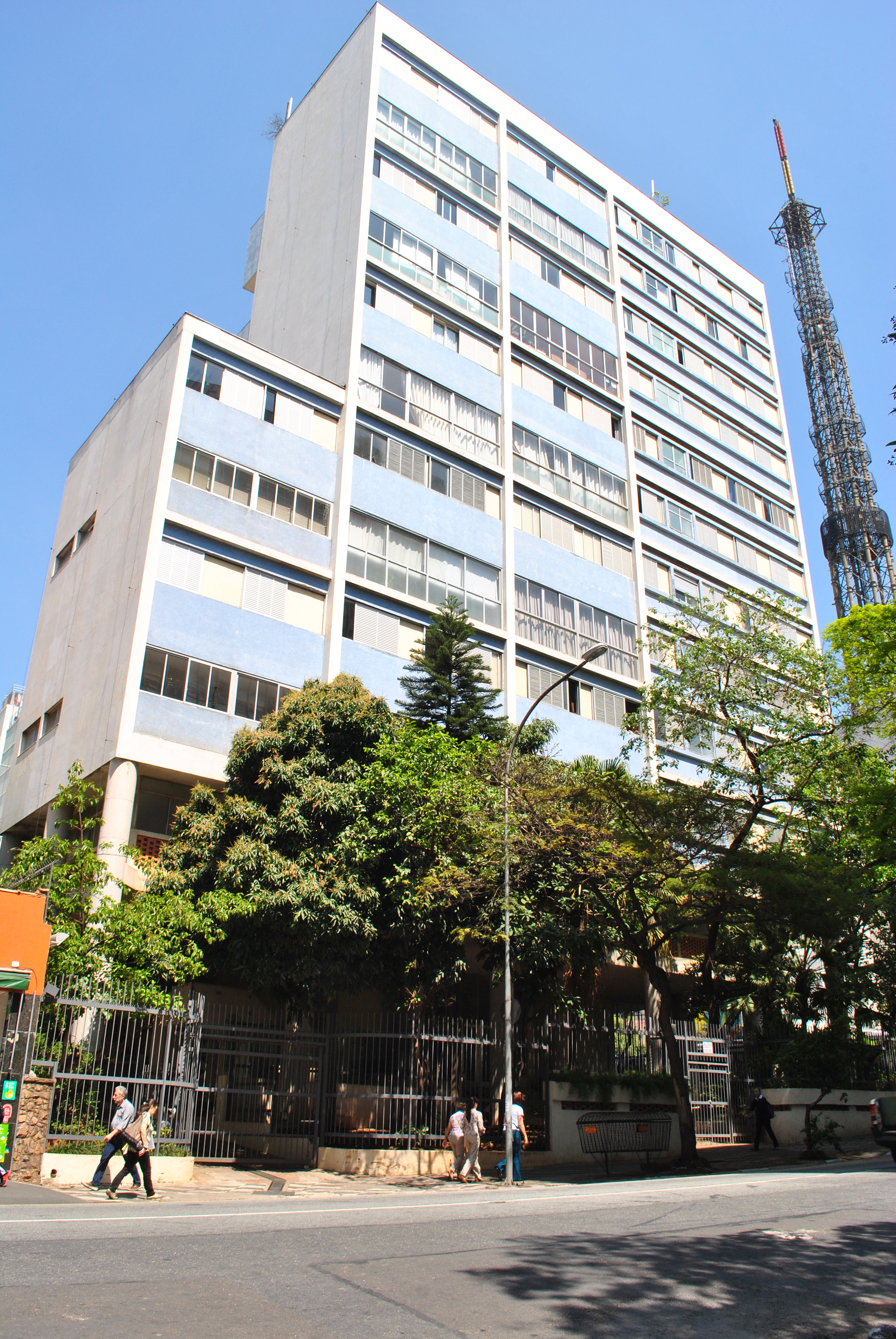
Side facing Angélica Avenue, where the only car exit is located.

The brothers were also responsible for the design of the headquarters of the Brazilian Press Association (Associação Brasileira de Imprensa - ABI), built in 1943 in Rio de Janeiro. Acknowledged for its contribution to the Brazilian modern architecture movement, the project introduced innovations such as the use of brise-soleil and detailed window frames, designed to adapt the architecture to the tropical climate and improve thermal comfort. The Roberto brothers contributed to the use of brise-soleil, a feature later incorporated into Brazilian architecture. In 1938, the Roberto brothers designed the passenger station at Santos Dumont Airport, following a competition held.

== Riviera bar ==
Initially, the Riviera bar was a meeting place for artists and intellectuals, such as Chico Buarque, Toquinho, and Elis Regina, where ideas critical of the military dictatorship were debated and disseminated. It was also a place associated with artistic compositions. In 1979, musician Arrigo Barnabé released his first album, Clara Crocodilo, with the song “Diversões Eletrônicas”, in which an excerpt takes place in the bar's environment:

Although it was a popular destination in the 70s and 80s, the Riviera bar experienced a decline in its audience starting in 1990. In 2006, after the INSS reported that the bar had not paid its rent since 1996, the Riviera closed its doors. The bar reopened in September 2013 under the management of chef Alex Atala and the businessman Facundo Guerra.

== Gallery ==
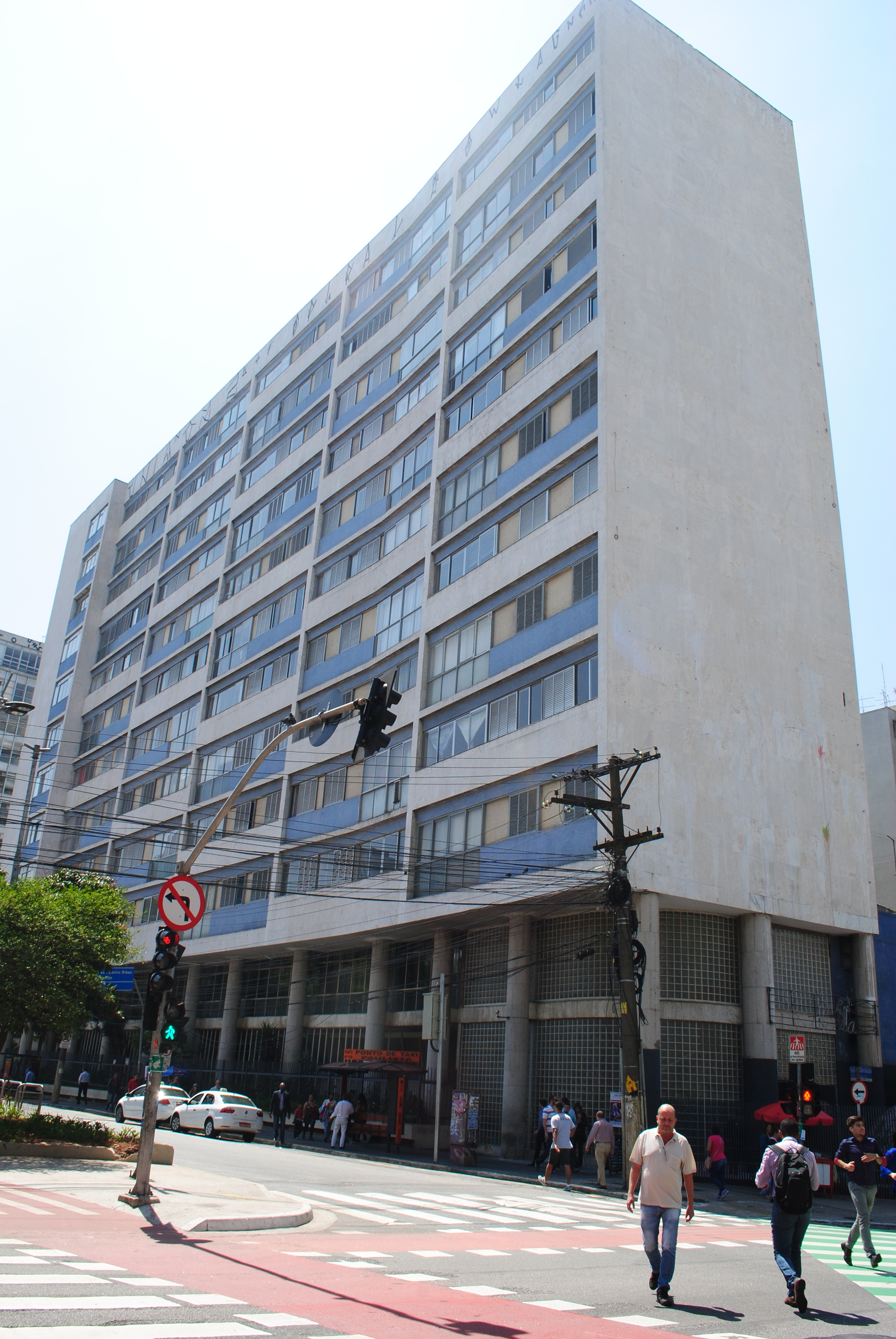
Facing Paulista Avenue.

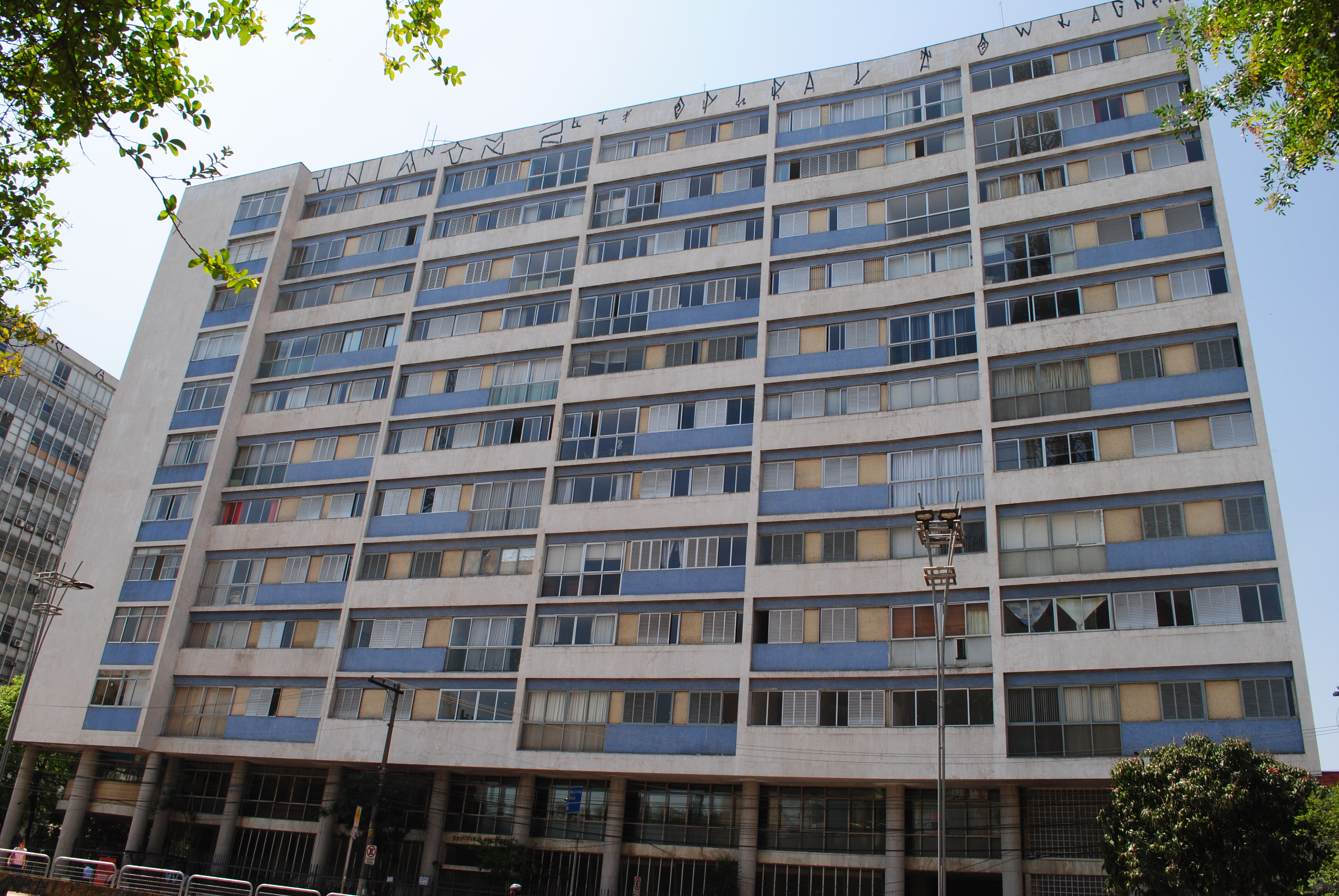
Architectural details, facing Paulista Avenue.

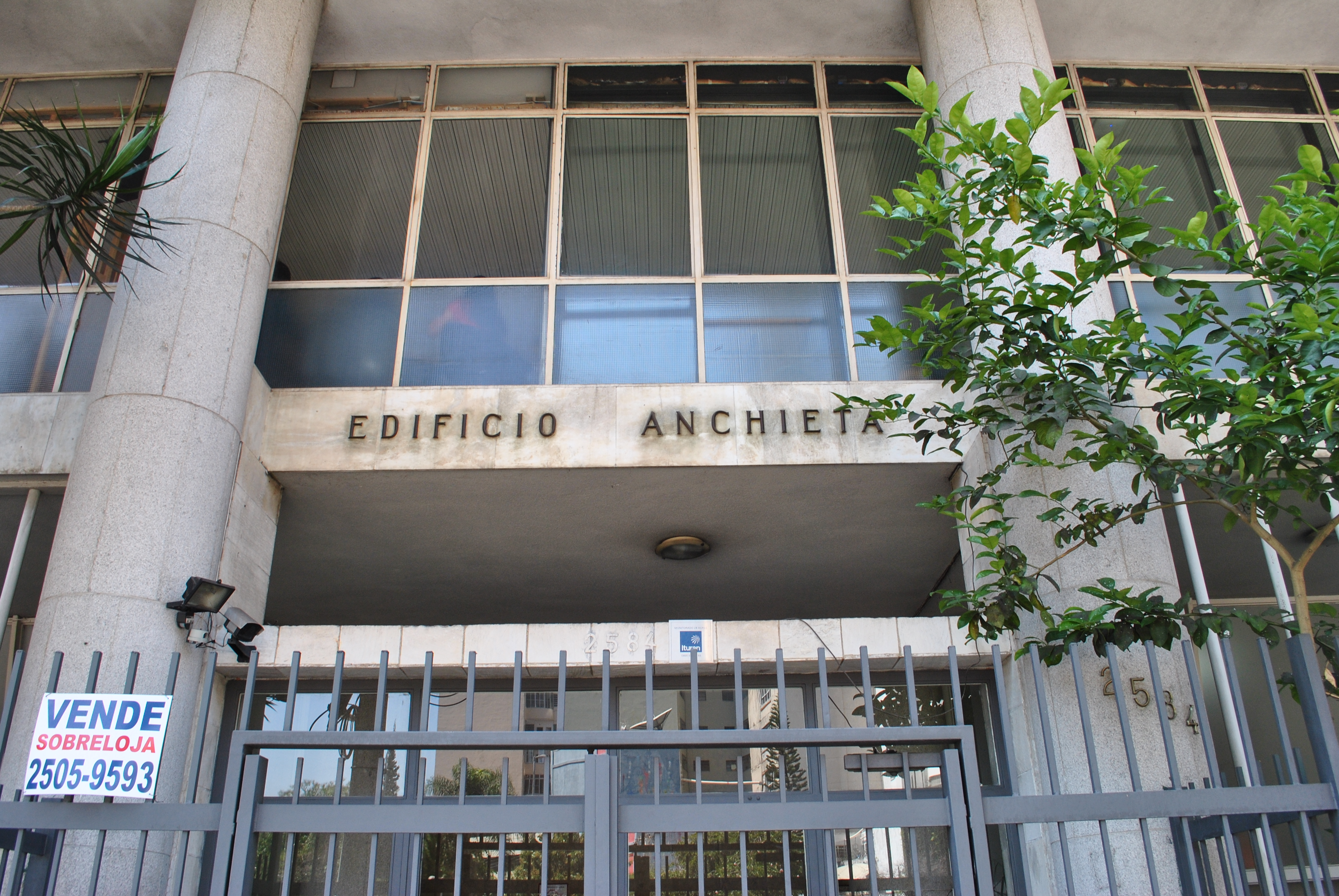
Entrance to the Anchieta Building.

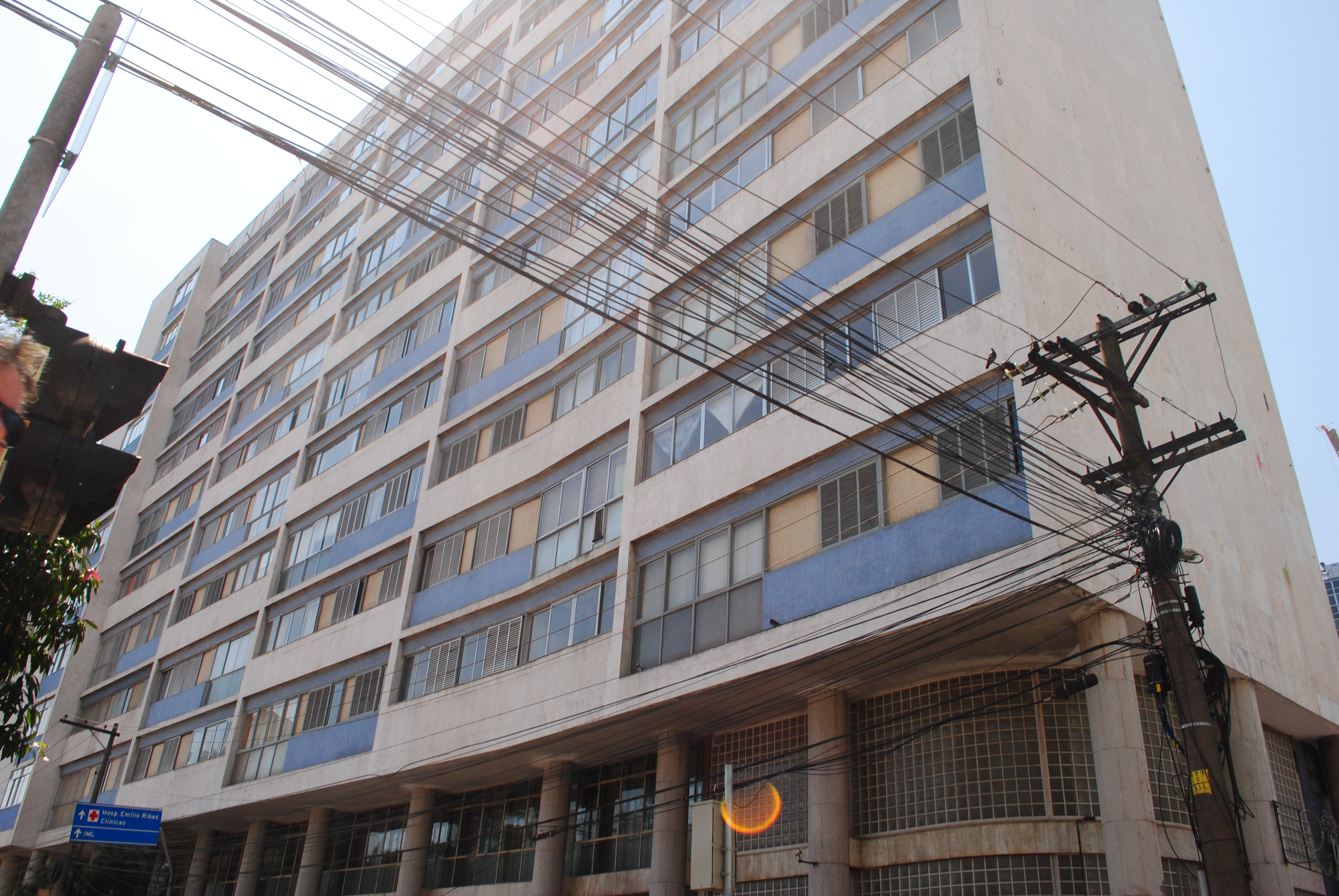
Façade facing Paulista Avenue.

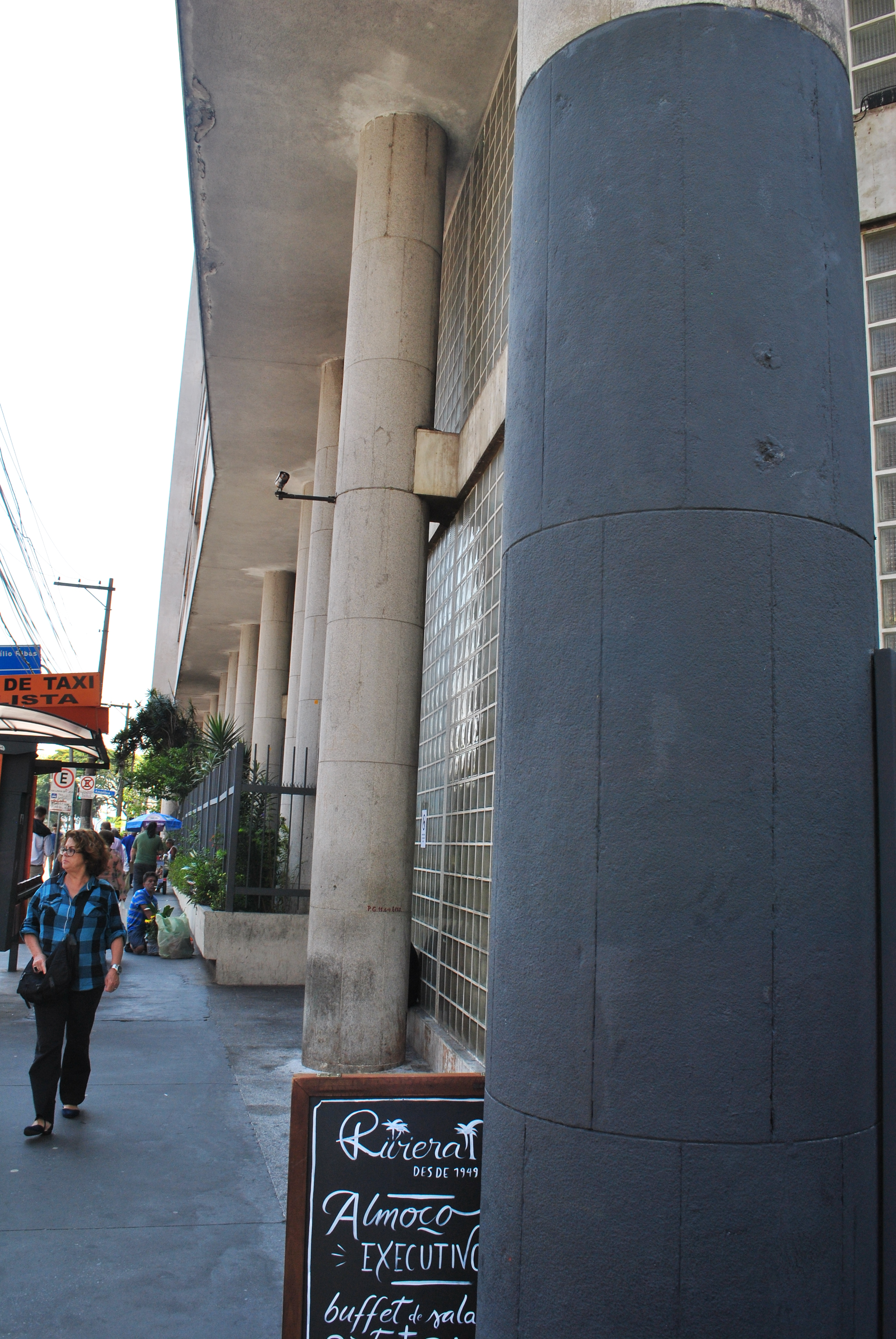
Detail of the columns, facing Paulista Avenue.

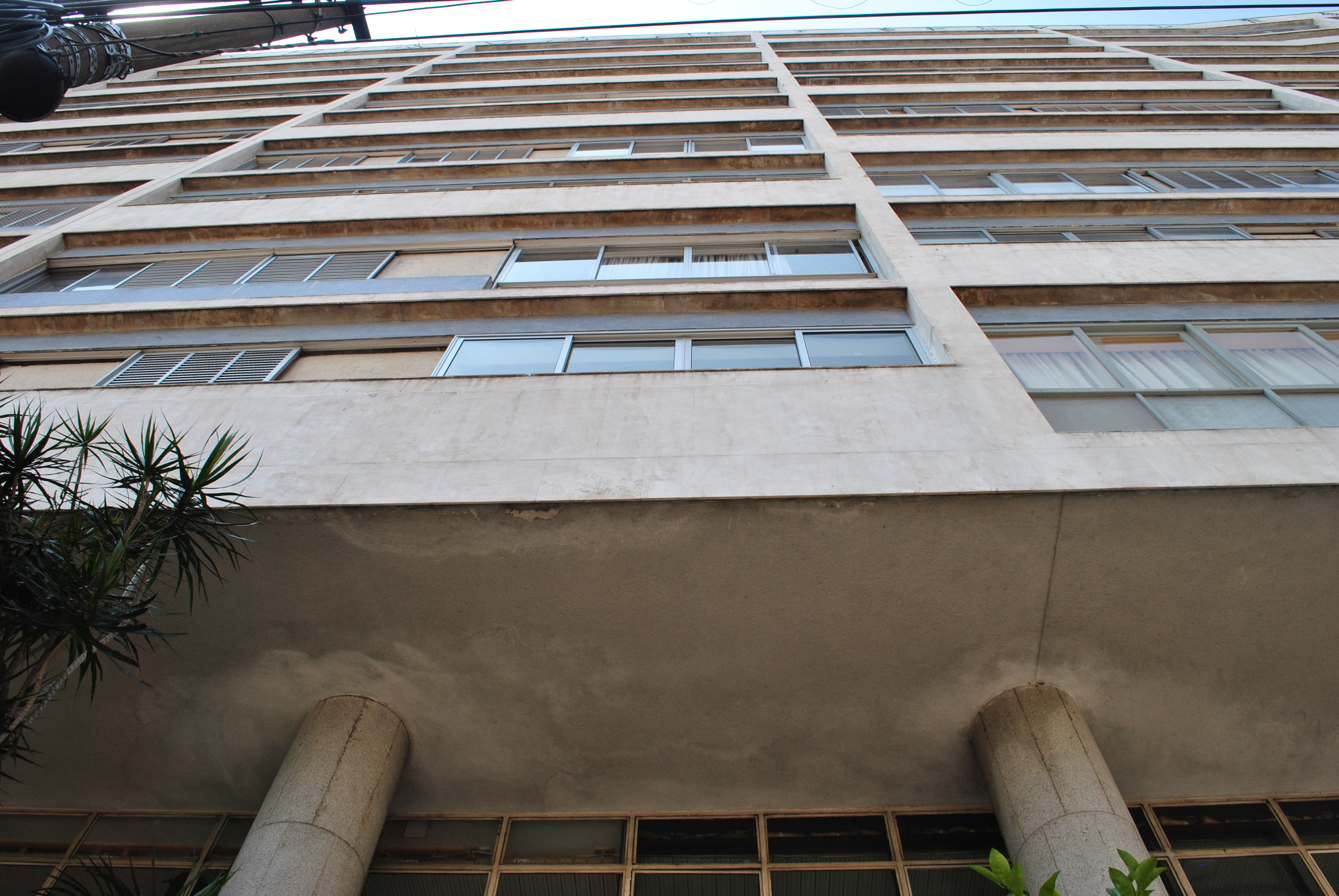
Lower view, facing Paulista Avenue.

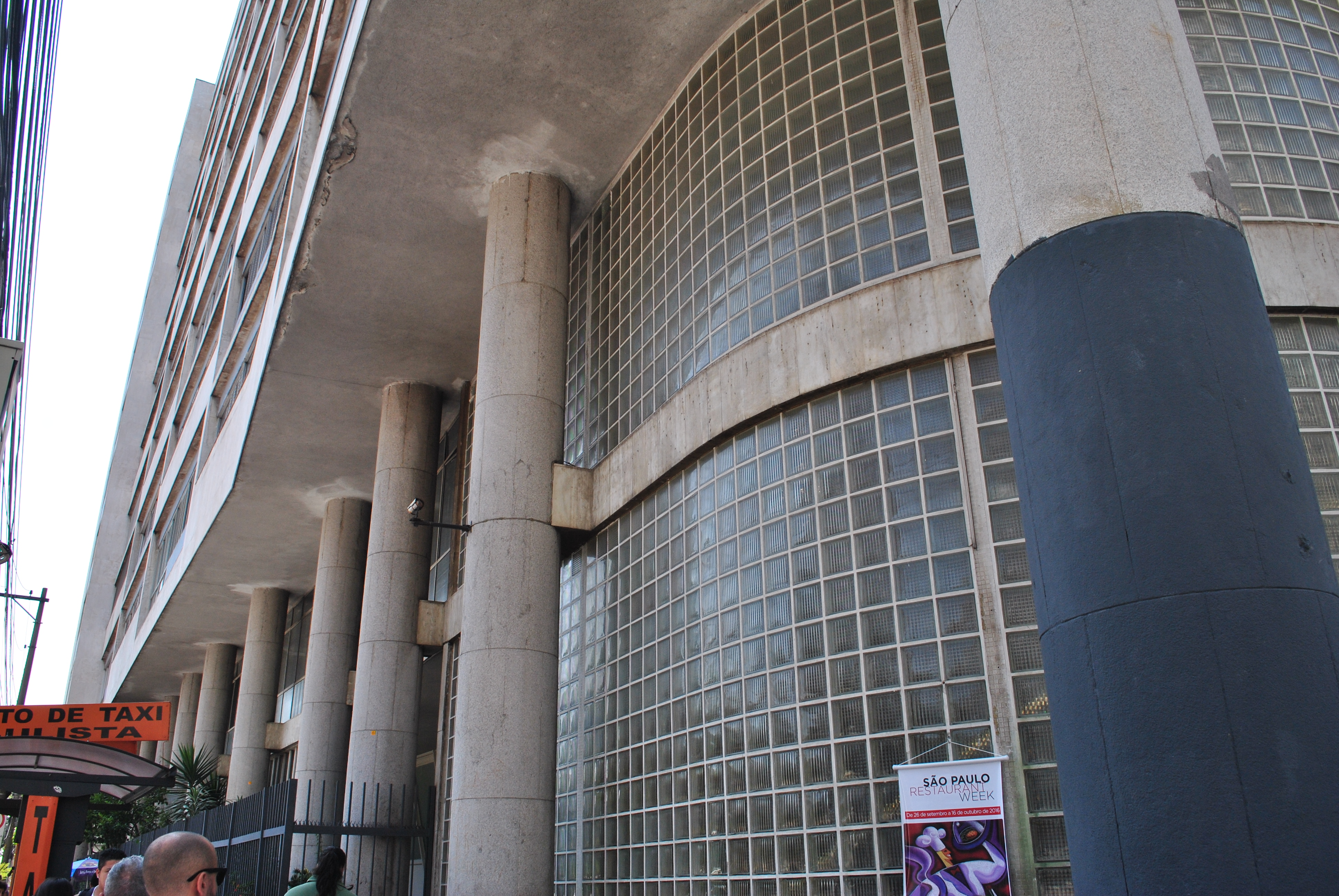
Architectural details of the façade, facing Paulista Avenue.

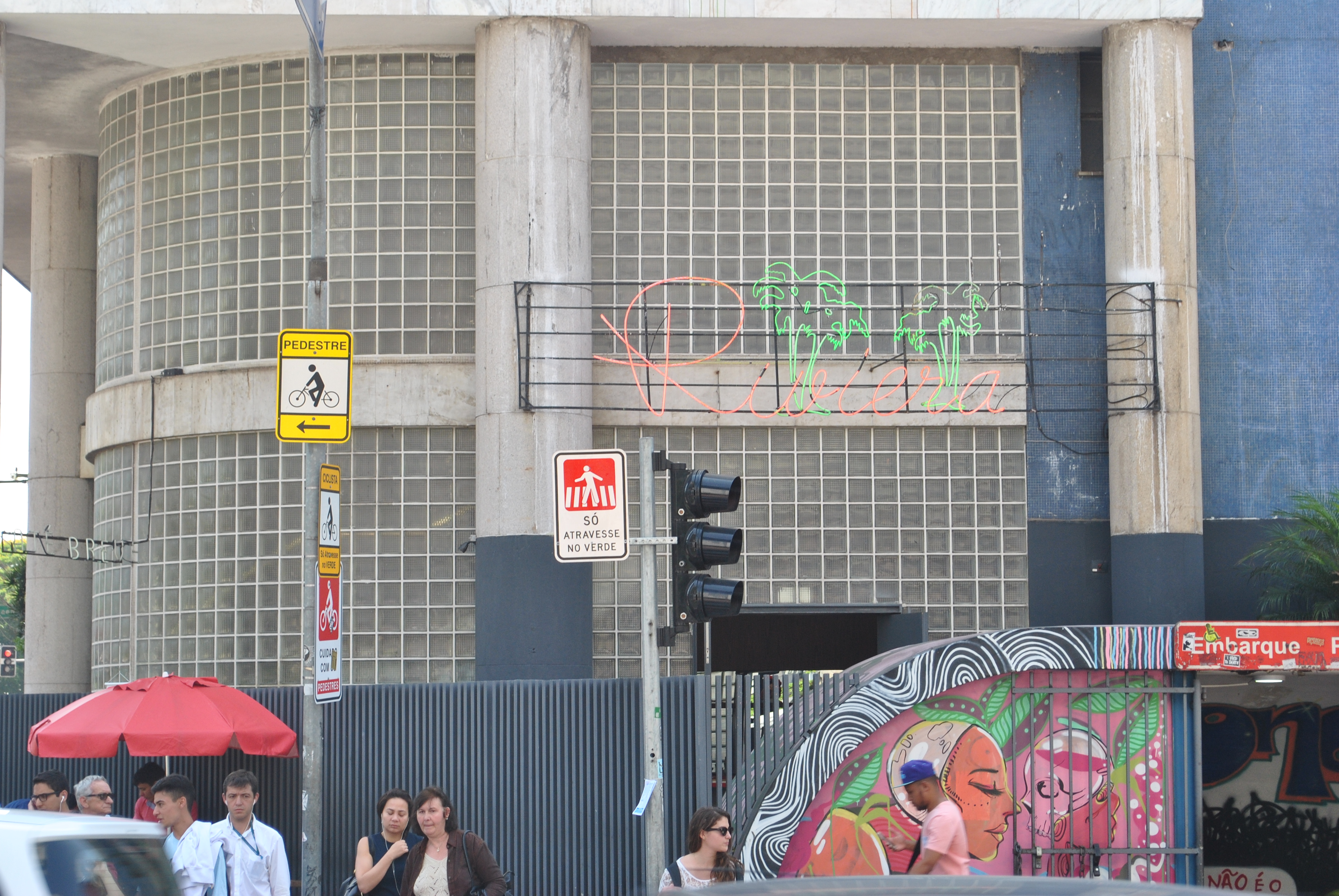
Bar Riviera was founded in 1949, occupying the first floor and upper floor of the Anchieta Building, facing Consolação Street.
