= Academia Paulista de Letras =

Non-profit organization promoting Brazilian literature

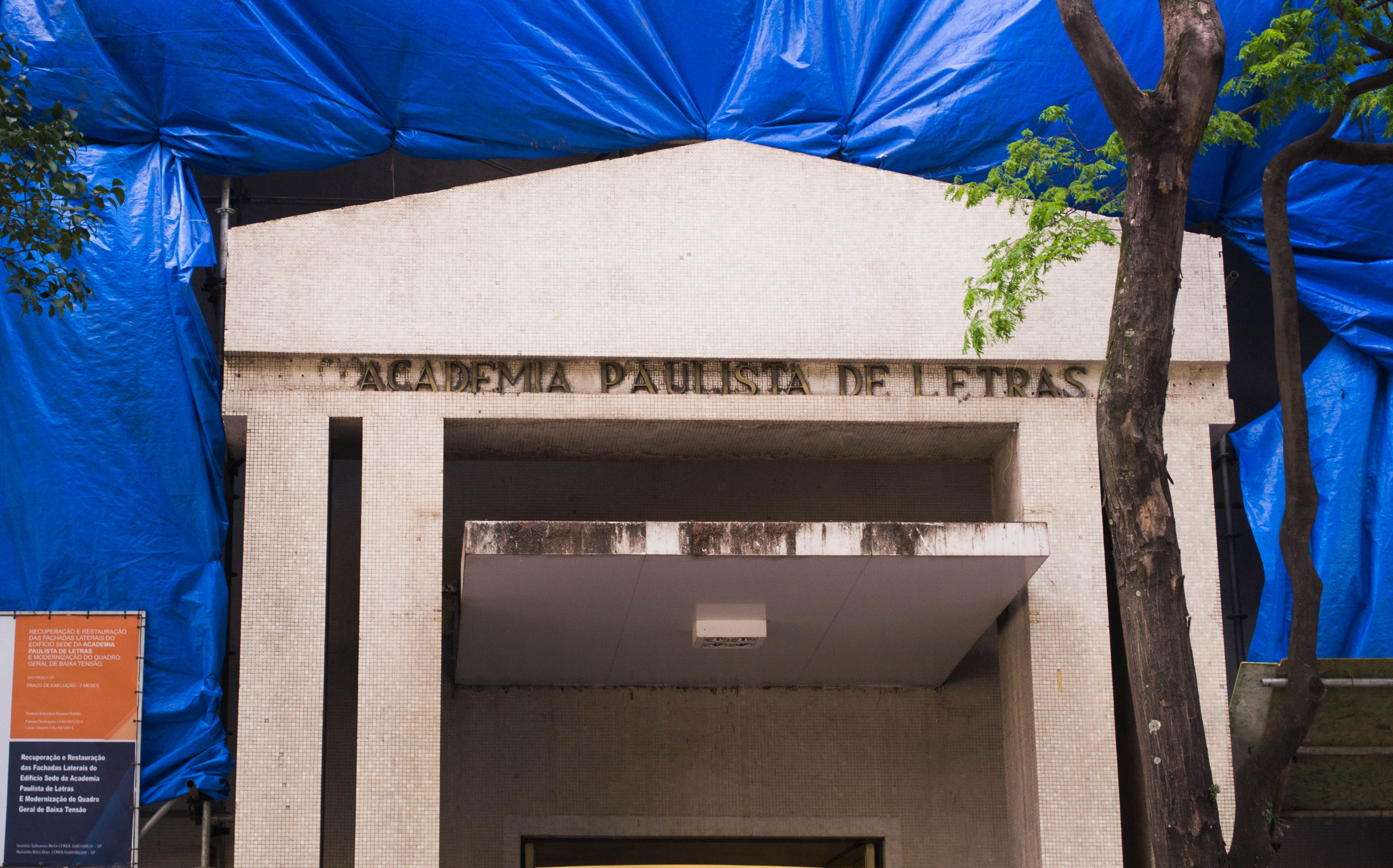

The Academia Paulista de Letras (Portuguese: Academy of Literature of São Paulo) is a non-profit organization with the objective of promoting Brazilian literature. The Academia Paulista de Letras was founded on November 27, 1909 by Joaquim José de Carvalho, who served as the organization's first Secretary General.

In 1955, The Academy's headquarters were established in Largo do Arouche, in the central region of the city of São Paulo. Designed by architect Jacques Pilon, who designed the Mário de Andrade Library, the building has characteristics of art deco and modernism, with features that show the absorption of geometric lines and rationalization of constructions.
