= Franz Heep =

German-Brazilian architect (1902–1978)

- Born: Adolf Franz Heep; July 24, 1902; Fachbach, Rhineland-Palatinate
- Died: April 3, 1978 (aged 75); Paris, France
- Education: Frankfurt School of Arts and Crafts, École Spéciale d'Architecture
- Occupation: Architect
- Buildings: Edifício Itália

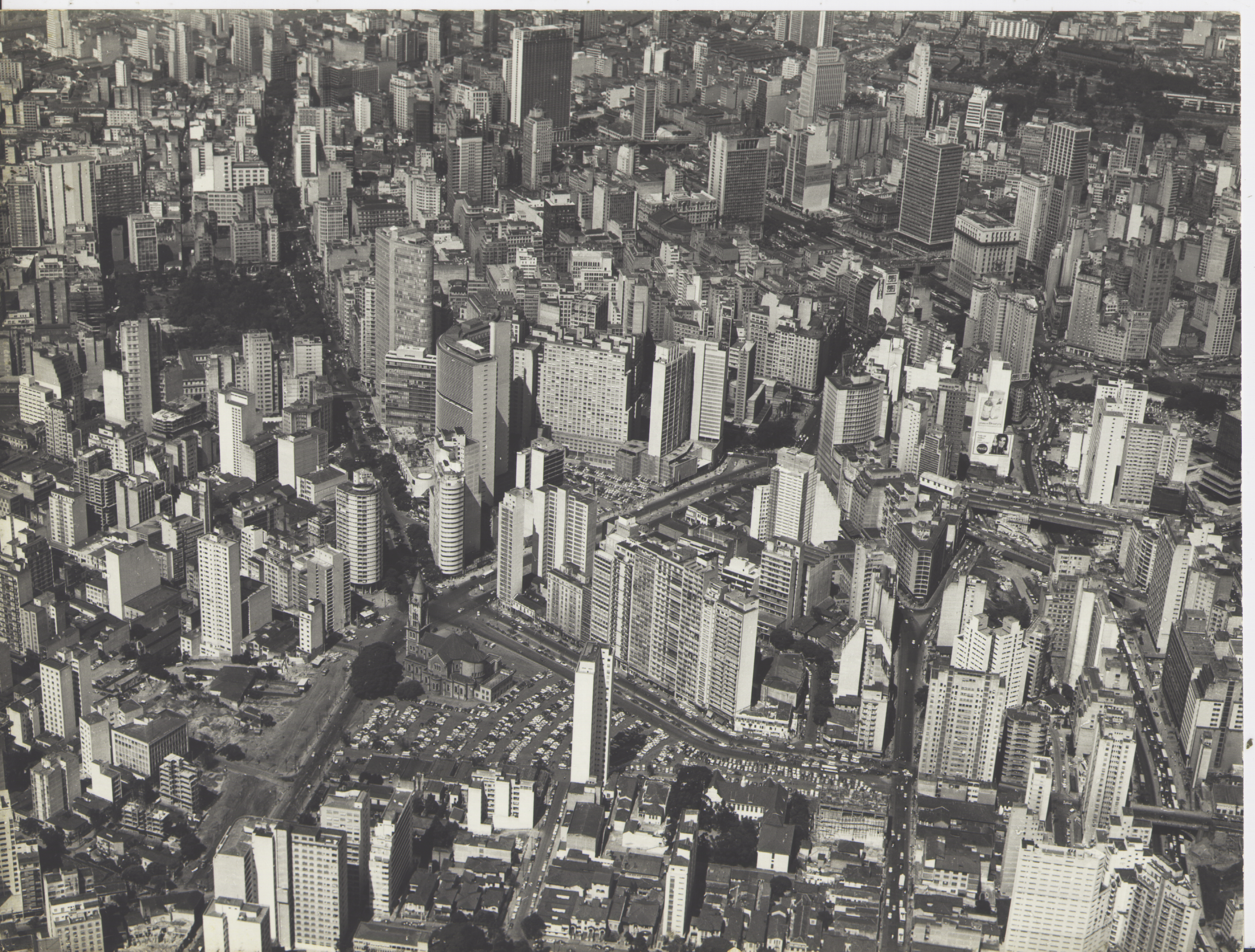
Werner Haberkorn - Aerial view of the city center. São Paulo-SP 3.jpg

Adolf Franz Heep (July 24, 1902 – April 3, 1978) was a German-Brazilian architect. He is known for his work in São Paulo in the 1950s and 1960s, the period of verticalization of the city. His signature work is Edifício Itália, once the tallest building in the city of São Paulo at 165 metres (541 ft). It was designated a landmark building by the city of São Paulo in 1992. Heep also worked as an educator at Mackenzie Presbyterian University in São Paulo and later for the United Nations.

== Early career ==
Adolf Heep was born in Fachbach, Rhineland-Palatinate on July 24, 1902. He studied architecture at the Kunstschule, Frankfurt am Main, which like the Bauhaus implemented reforms in the teaching of art and architecture. Heep was a pupil of Walter Gropius and Adolf Meyer, with whom he later worked in Frankfurt between 1924 and 1928. He finished his education at École Spéciale d'Architecture in Paris. In this period Heep saw the construction of buildings in the neighborhoods of Höhenblick and Römerstadt using industrialized construction methods such as prefabricated panels and standardized window frames, both of which became part of his later works. Heep moved to Paris in 1928 where he worked with Le Corbusier for four years. While in Paris, Heep developed vertical apartment buildings for middle-class residents in partnership with the Polish architect Jean Ginsberg (1905–1983).

== Career in São Paulo ==
Heep arrived in São Paulo in 1947 as part of a wave of European architects who emigrated to Brazil. He was first employed by the Franco-Brazilian architect Jacques Pilon. He worked with Pilon on the headquarters of the newspaper O Estado de S. Paulo which used modern elements such as brise-soleil. Heep became a naturalized citizen of Brazil in 1952. He worked briefly with Henrique Mindlin (1911–1971), and opened his own office two years later. Heep focused on vertical housing projects, producing two dozen residential buildings. His work ranged from luxury apartments in Higienópolis to small kitchenettes in the center of São Paulo. His signature work, Edifício Itália, dates from this period. Heep considered the São Domingos Church in Perdizes his finest work; construction on the church began in 1952 and continued for 14 years. Heep was noted for his "rigorous technical design in construction, specifications and finishes, and by careful planning."

Heep became an accredited architect in 1959 at the end of his residential construction period. He worked as a professor at the Mackenzie School of Architecture and Urbanism from 1958 and 1965. He then served as a member of the United Nations Architecture Council for Latin American countries on projects in Peru and Paraguay. He died in 1978 in Paris.

== Works ==
- 1952: Edifício Marajó, Edifício Marajó
- 1953: Edifício Itália, Edifício Ibaté, Edifício Normandie, Edifício Arapuan, Edifício Icaraí, Edifício Maracanã
- 1954: Edifício Ouro Preto
- 1954: Edifício Araraúnas
- 1956: Edifício Guaporé, Edifício Buriti, Edifício Iporanga
- 1956: Edifício Lausanne, Edifício Lugano-Locarno
- 1956: Edifício Arlinda
