= Edifício Itália =

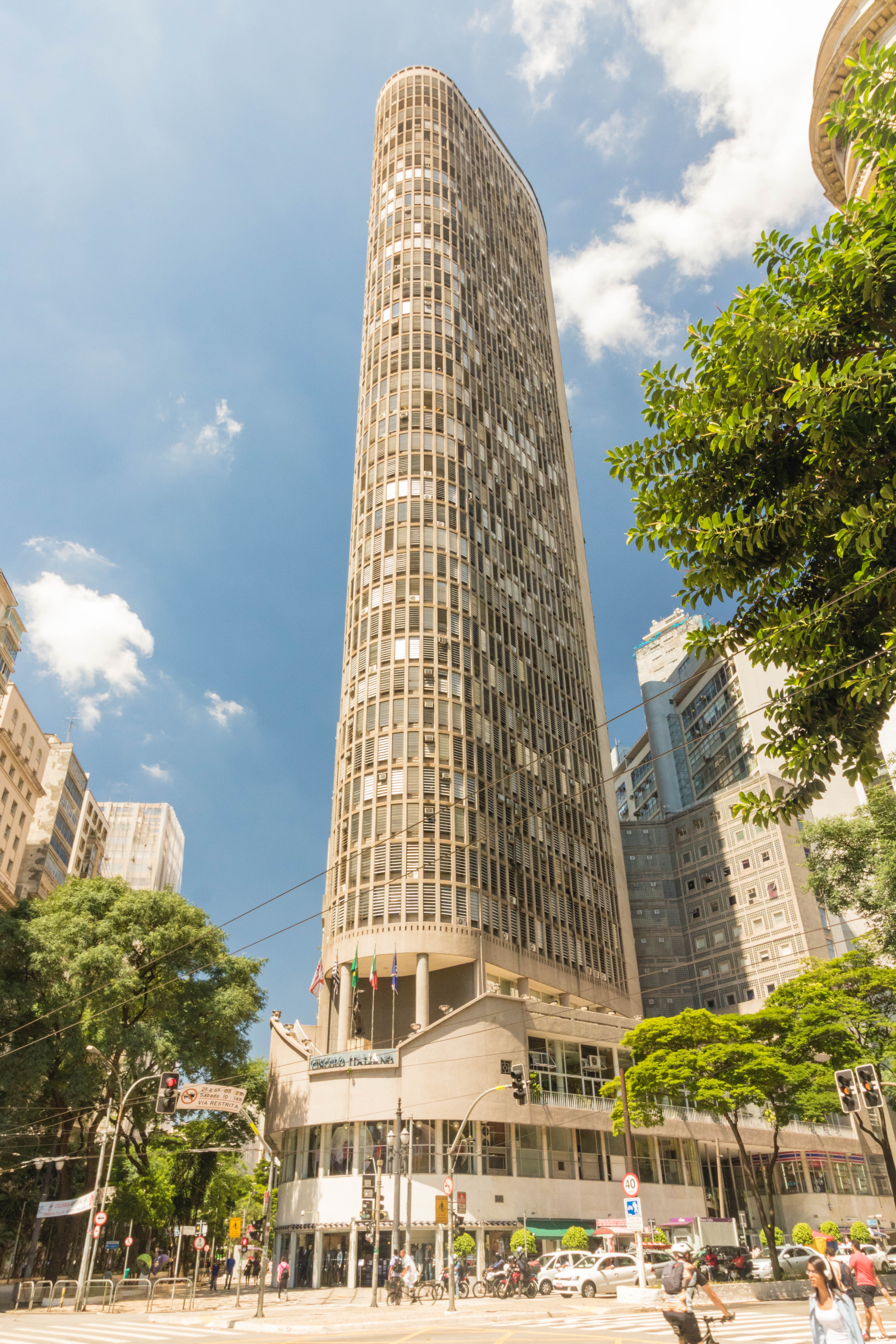
- Edifício Itália in São Paulo

- Location within São Paulo Location within Brazil

General information
- Type: Skyscraper
- Location: Ipiranga Avenue, 344; Centre, São Paulo
- Coordinates: 23°32′44″S 46°38′37″W
- Construction started: 1956
- Completed: 1965
- Inaugurated: 1965

Height
- Height: 165 m (541 ft)

Technical details
- Floor count: 46
- Floor area: 52,000 m^{2} (560,000 sq ft)
- Lifts/elevators: 19

Design and construction
- Architect: Franz Heep

Edifício Itália (Portuguese for "Italy Building") (whose official name is Circolo Italiano) is a 165 m (541 ft) tall 46-story skyscraper located in the República district, Central Zone of São Paulo, Brazil. Built from 1956 to 1965, it has a rooftop observation deck, open for tourists.

Edifício Itália was designed by Brazilian architect Franz Heep. It is the 4th tallest building in São Paulo.

== Design and facilities ==
The building's facade was designed to create natural ventilation and stable internal air while protecting tenants from the direct sunlight.

=== Terraço Itália Restaurant ===
Inaugurated on 29 September 1967, the Terraço Itália Restaurant is one of the best known restaurants in the city, located at the 41st floor, with wide views to the city's southern zone. In 1968, the restaurant was visited by Queen Elizabeth II.

The Bar do Terraço is a bar with live music located on the 42nd floor. It faces the northern zone of the city and the Serra da Cantareira. It has access to the terrace, the building's observatory.

=== Sala São Paulo ===
The Sala São Paulo is a famous room for corporate and social events located in the 41st floor.

== See also ==
- List of tallest buildings in São Paulo
- List of tallest buildings in Brazil
- List of tallest buildings in South America
