= Praça da República (São Paulo) =

Park and public square in São Paulo, Brazil

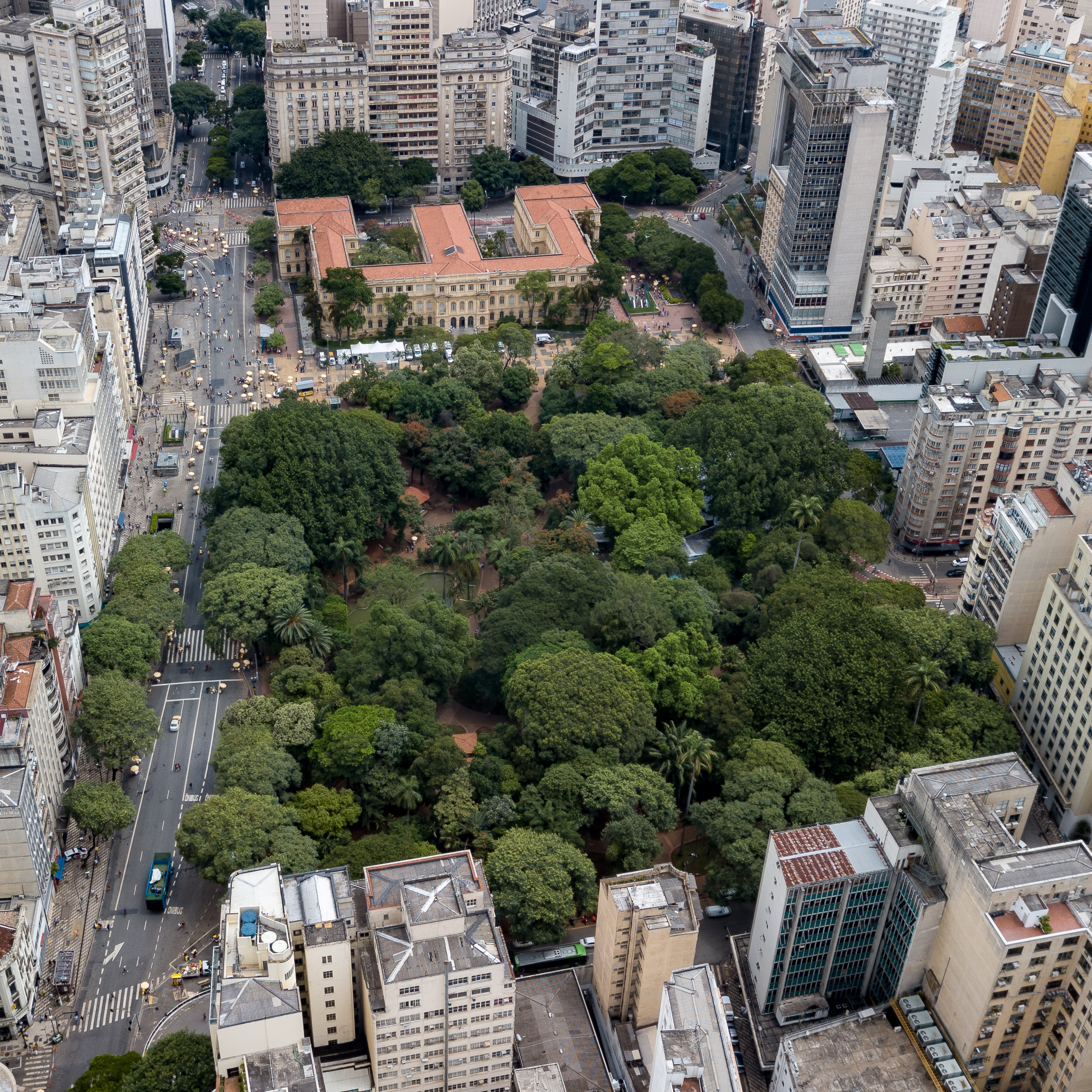
- Praça da República from above

- Location within São Paulo Location within Brazil
- Type: Public square
- Location: República, São Paulo, Brazil
- Coordinates: 23°32′35″S 46°38′33″W
- Created: 19th century
- Public transit: República

Praça da República (Portuguese: Square of the Republic) is a park and public square in the República neighborhood of São Paulo, Brazil. The park covers several city blocks between Rua Pedro Américo, Rua Vinte e Quatro de Maio, Avenida Ipiranga, and Avenida São João in the historic center of the city. Praça da República had many names before 1889, including Largo dos Curros, Largo da Palha, Praça das Milícias, Largo Sete de Abril, and Praça 15 de Novembro.

On Sundays, there is an open-air market on the Praça da República with many food carts and vendors selling art, clothing, jewelry, and handicrafts. Artisans come from the North and Northeast regions of Brazil as well as neighboring countries in Latin America to sell their goods.

== Architecture ==
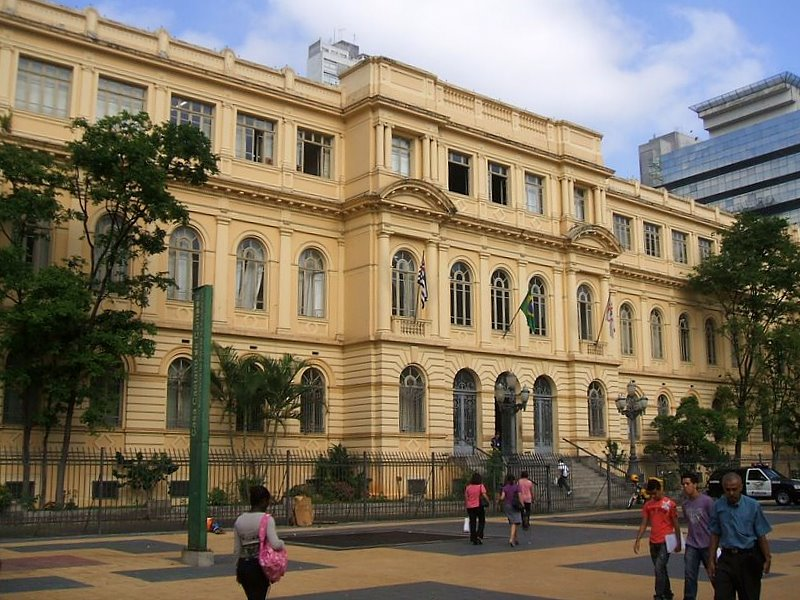
Casa Caetano de Campos, Praça da República, São Paulo

The largest structure on Praça Da República is the Casa Caetano de Campos, built in 1894 and protected by the state of São Paulo; since 1979, this building has been the home of the State Education Department. Modernist apartment buildings on the square date to the 1930s, and include the Esther Building, the São Tomás Buildings, Oscar Niemeyer's Eiffel Building, and Jacques Pilon's São Luiz Building.

Two of São Paulo's most iconic buildings, Edifício Copan and Edifício Itália, are located just to the south of Praça da República near the corner of avenidas São Luís and Ipiranga.

== Transportation ==
The square is served by São Paulo Metrô lines 4 (Yellow) and 3 (Red) via the República station at the southern end of the park.
