= Consolação Street =

Street in São Paulo, Brazil

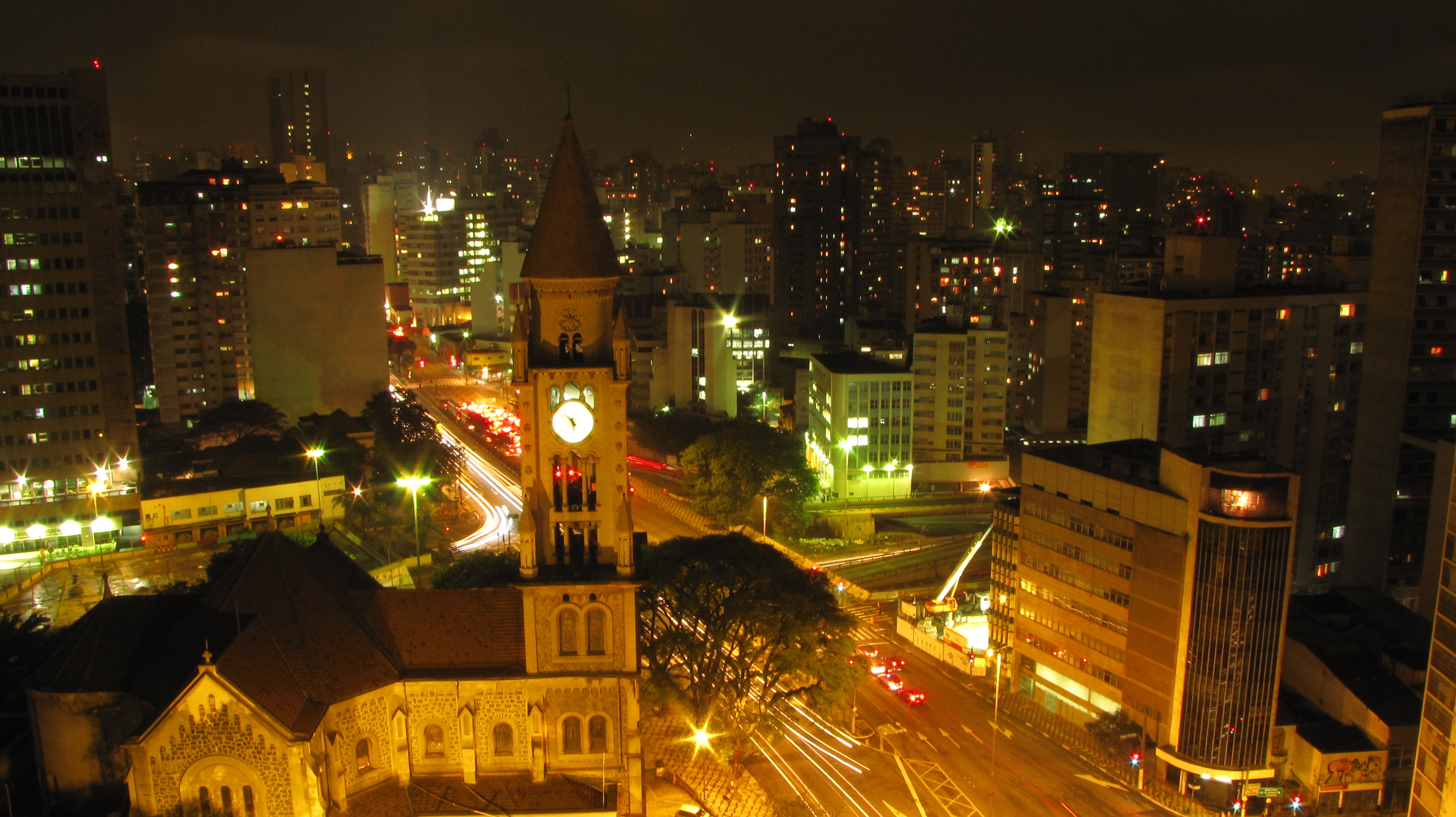
- Consolação Street at night, highlighting the Church of the Consolation.
- Length: 3,700 m (12,100 ft)
- Location: São Paulo, São Paulo; Brazil

Consolação Street (Portuguese: Rua da Consolação) is an important thoroughfare in the Brazilian city of São Paulo. It begins in the central area of the city, near the Anhangabaú Valley, and ends at Estados Unidos Street, in the Jardins district.

It has three different stretches. In the first and third sections, between Anhangabaú Valley and São Luís Avenue, and between Paulista Avenue and Estados Unidos Street, it consists of a single lane road. In the central section, it has eight lanes (two of which are exclusive bus lanes) and integrates the Campo Limpo-Rebouças-Centro bus corridor.

== History ==
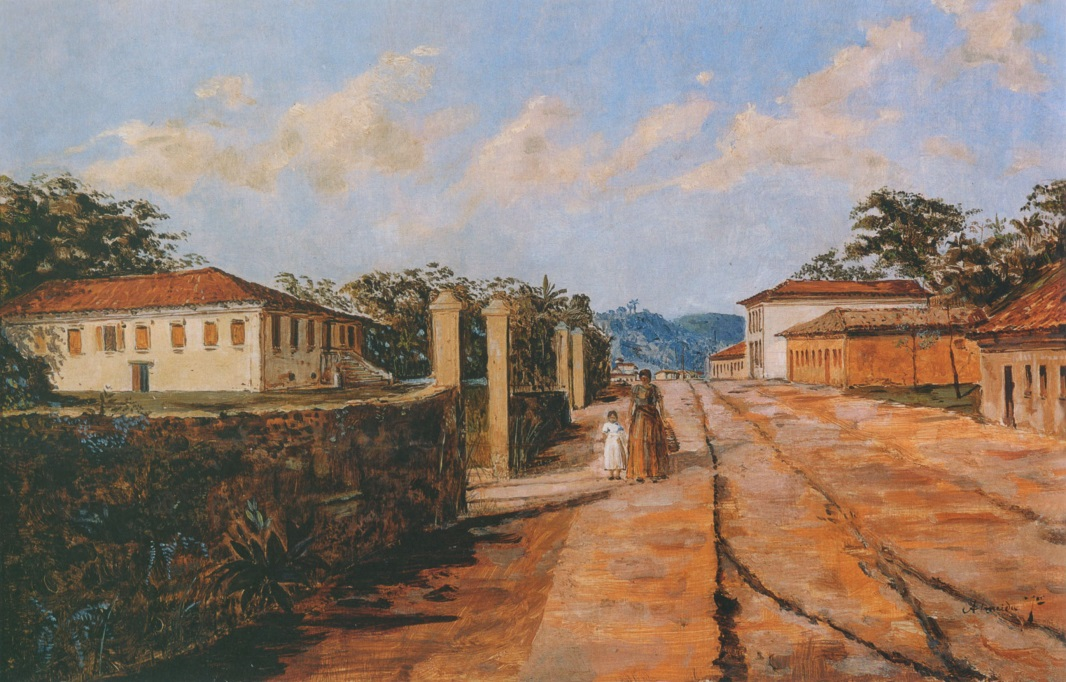
Consolação Street in the late 19th century by Almeida Júnior

Consolação Street originated from the Pinheiros Path (Caminho de Pinheiros), a road that existed during colonial Brazil and connected Vila de São Paulo to Vila de Pinheiros. It marked the beginning of the route to the cities in the west. It started at the end of Direita Street, passed through Anhangabaú Valley and continued towards Pinheiros until it met Sorocaba Road. It was also known as Aniceto Path (Caminho do Aniceto) and Taques Street (Rua do Taques). The current name derives from the construction of the old Church of Our Lady of Consolation in 1800. Despite the presence of the church, the current neighborhood of Consolação remained isolated, far from the city and with very few residents in 1855.

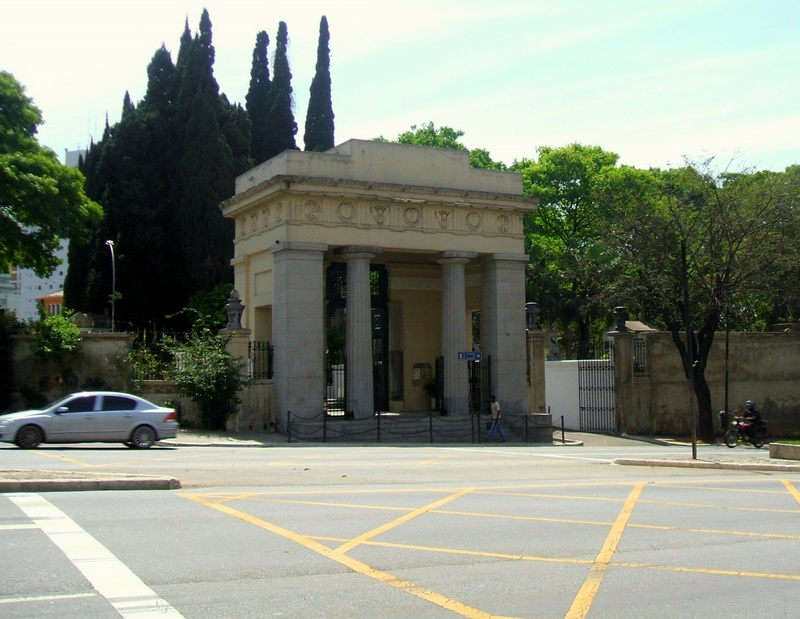
Door of the Consolação Cemetery.

The Consolação Public Cemetery began to be built in 1854 and was opened on July 3, 1858 during a smallpox epidemic that afflicted São Paulo. At the end of the 19th century, Consolação Street was one of the main roads leading to Paulista Avenue. Between the 1950s and 1960s, it underwent an extensive renovation that widened the space. The first stores specializing in lighting and chandeliers were established around the same time. Despite having all the characteristics of an avenue, the official name remains Consolação Street.

At the end of the 19th century, São Paulo's first velodrome was installed in Consolação Street. The track measured 380 meters long by 8 meters wide and had a 700-meter-long grandstand for 800 spectators. It also had tennis courts, a soccer field and ponds for swimming.

In the 1960s, Mayor Faria Lima decided to double the street. Work began in 1965 and finished in 1968 after expropriations and demolitions were carried out between Dona Antônia de Queirós Street and Paulista Avenue. The area expropriated for enlargement was 21,600 square meters. In 1972, the Consolação Gallery, a pedestrian passage under the street where cinemas, nightclubs, bars and restaurants are located, was built.

== Important buildings ==
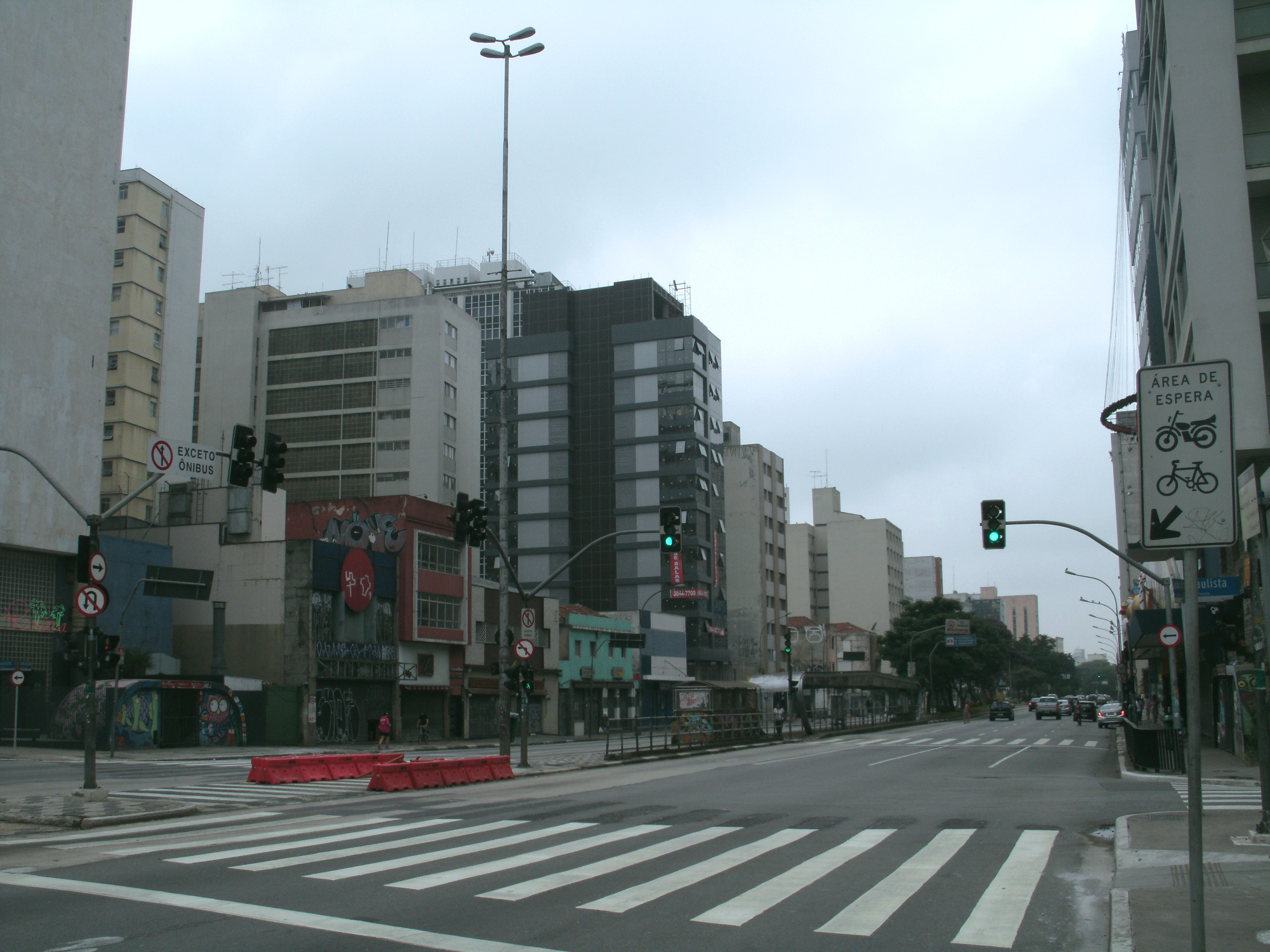
Consolação Street at the junction with Paulista Avenue.

Consolação Street has several important buildings, such as the Anchieta Building, where the Riviera Bar, a place frequented by bohemians and intellectuals, used to be, and the Cine Belas Artes, inaugurated in 1943 as the Cine Ritz. The site is also home to the Mário de Andrade Library, with a collection of over 450,000 titles and more than 8,000 rare books, the Mackenzie Presbyterian University and the Marina Cintra College. There is also the Higienópolis-Mackenzie station on Line 4 of the Metro, which opened on January 23, 2018, on the corner of Piauí Street.

== Transportation ==
Besides belonging to the Campo Limpo-Rebouças-Centro bus corridor, one of the city's structural transportation routes, Consolação Street also has two subway stations: Higienópolis-Mackenzie and Paulista, both on Line 4-Yellow. Paulista Station is integrated with Consolação Station on Line 2-Green.

== See also ==
- Tourism in the city of São Paulo
