= República (district of São Paulo) =

District of São Paulo, Brazil

Coordinates: 23°32′37″S 46°38′31″W

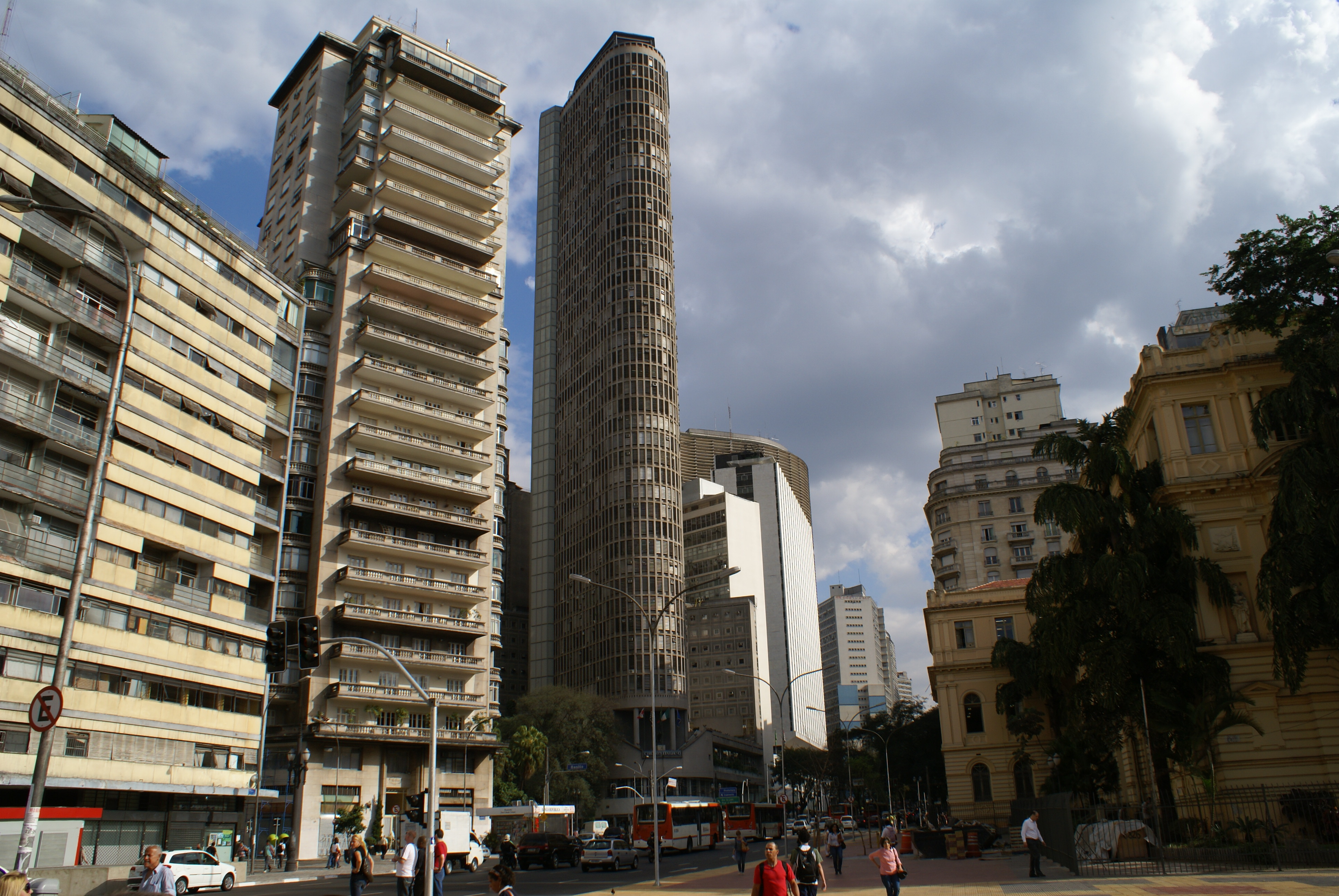
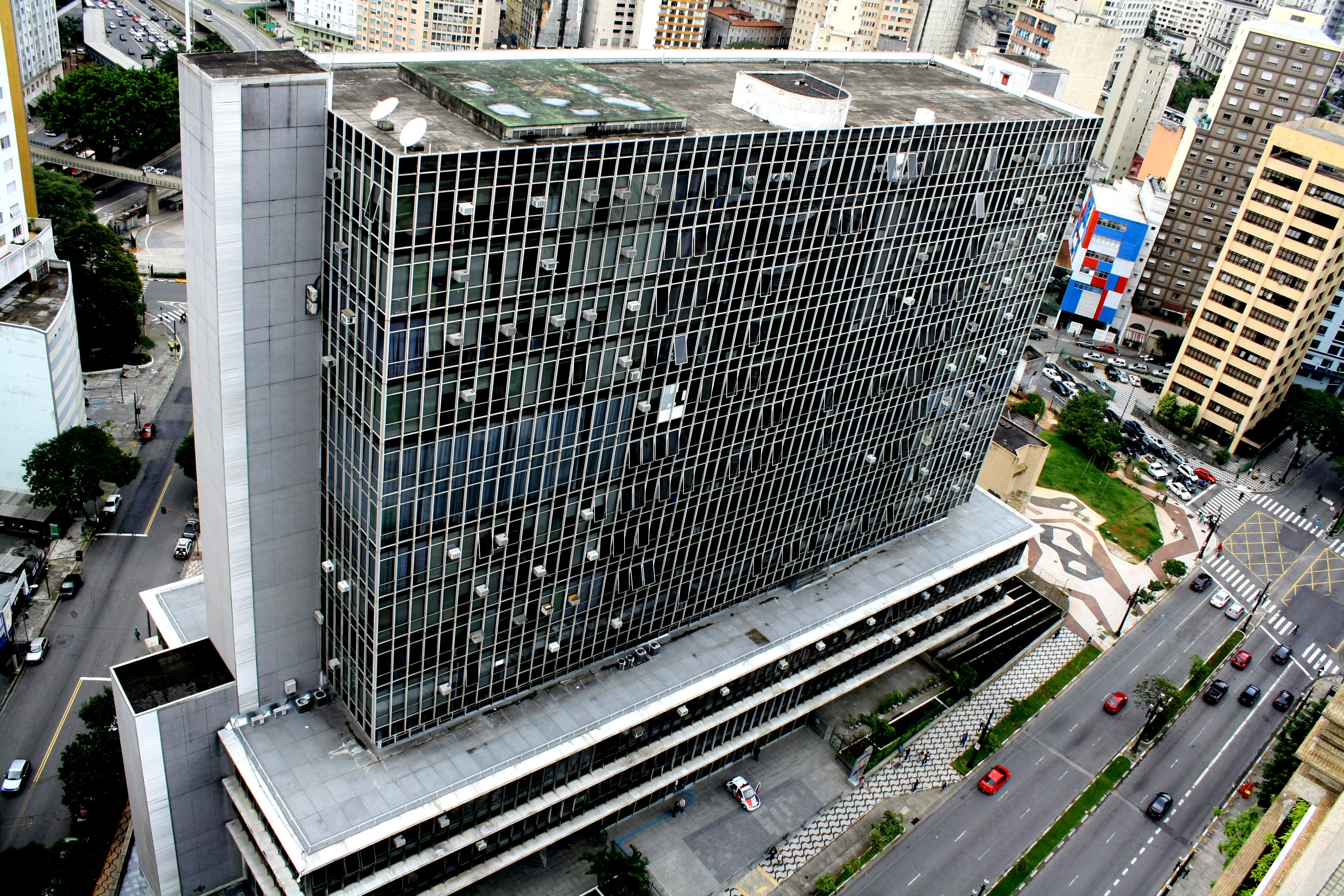
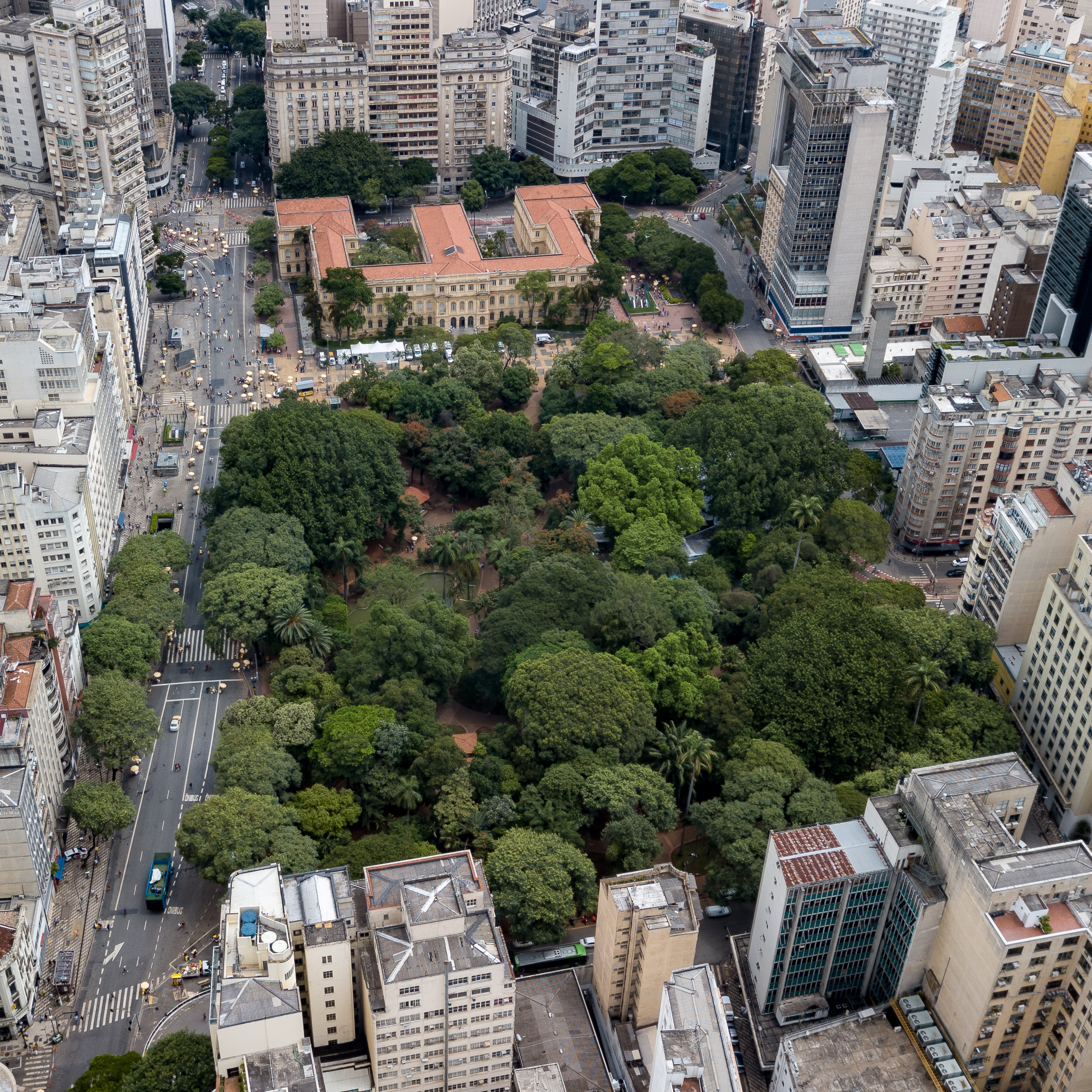
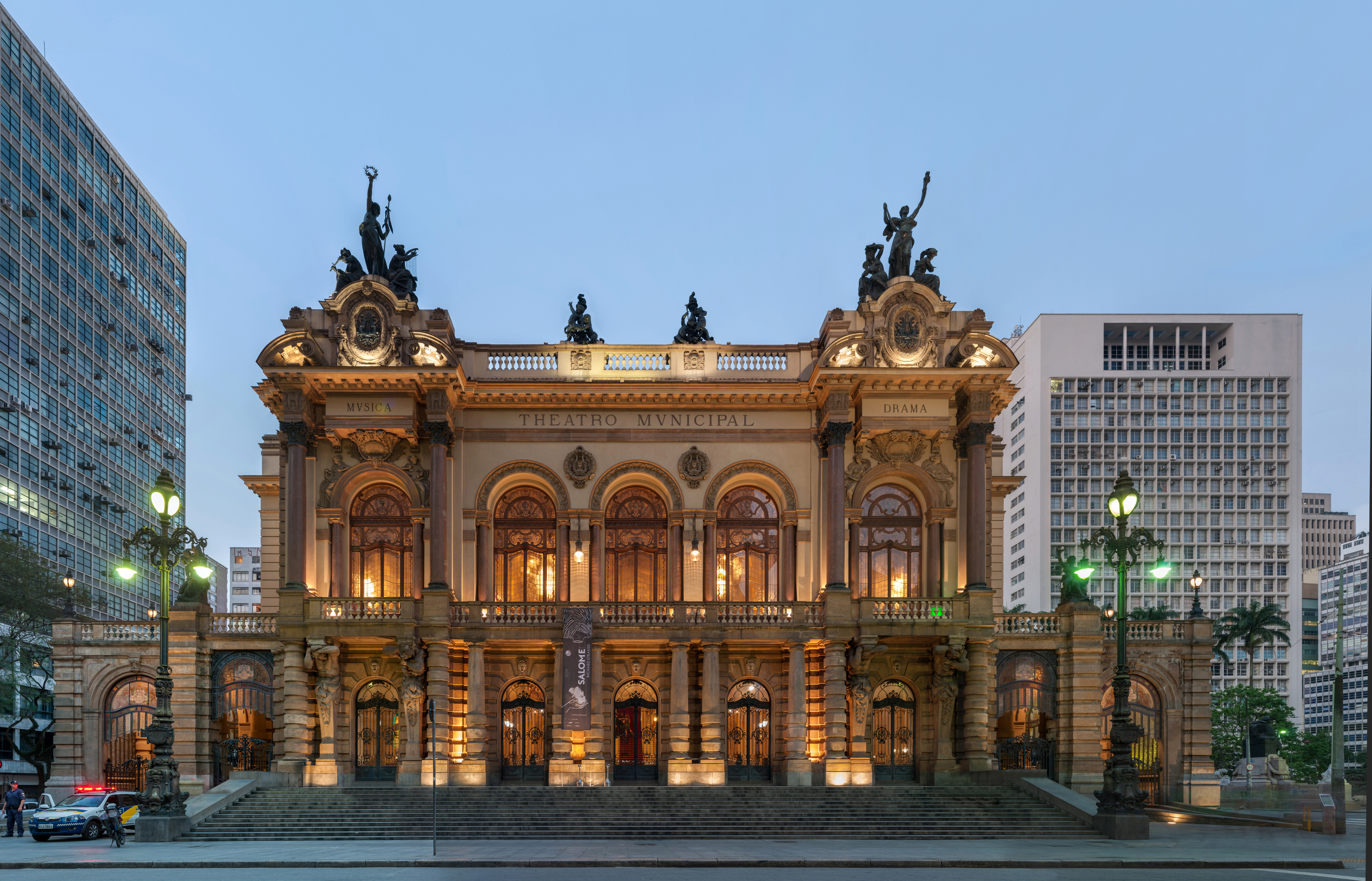
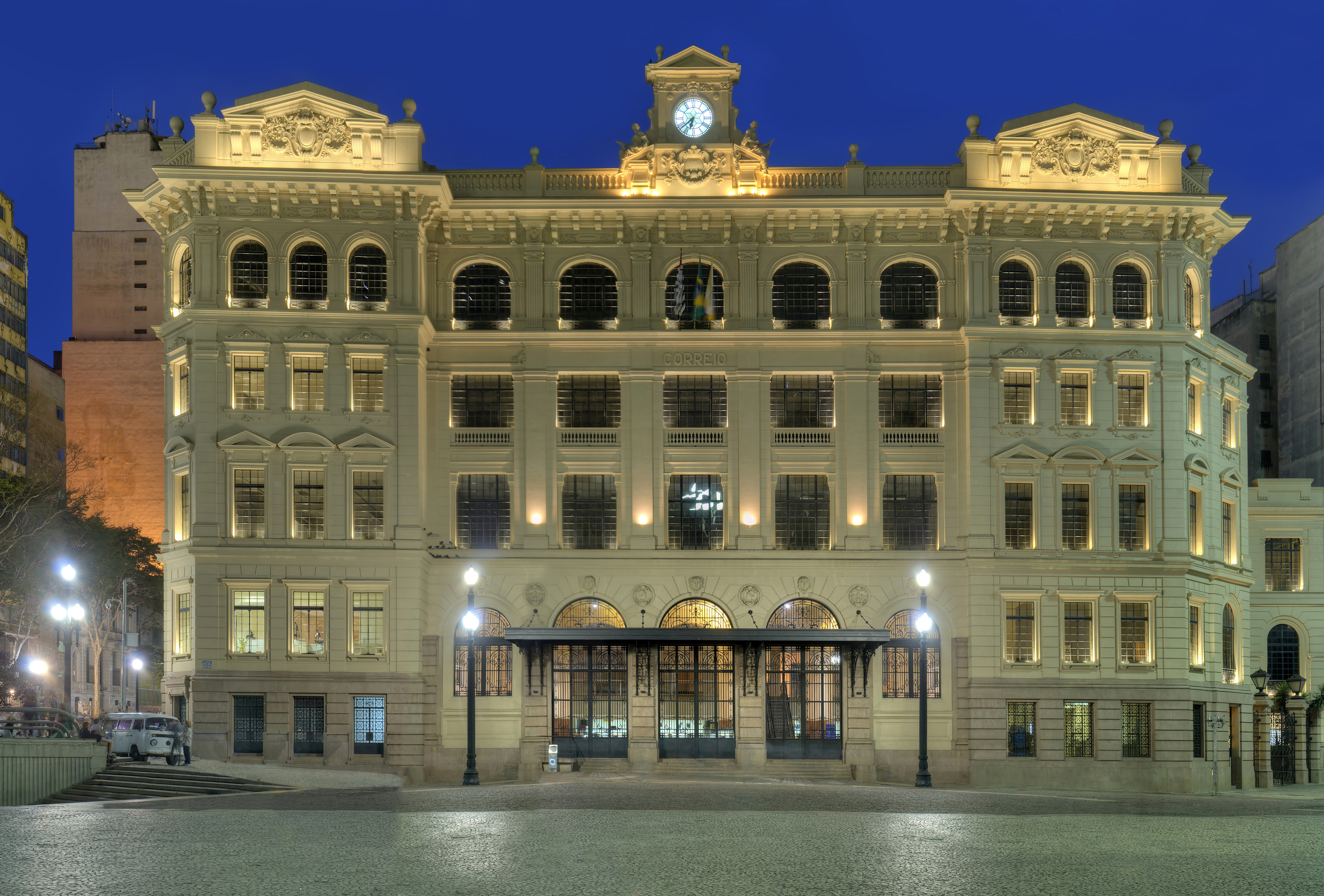
- Skyline of República Anchieta Palace Praça da República Municipal Theater of São Paulo Palácio dos Correios

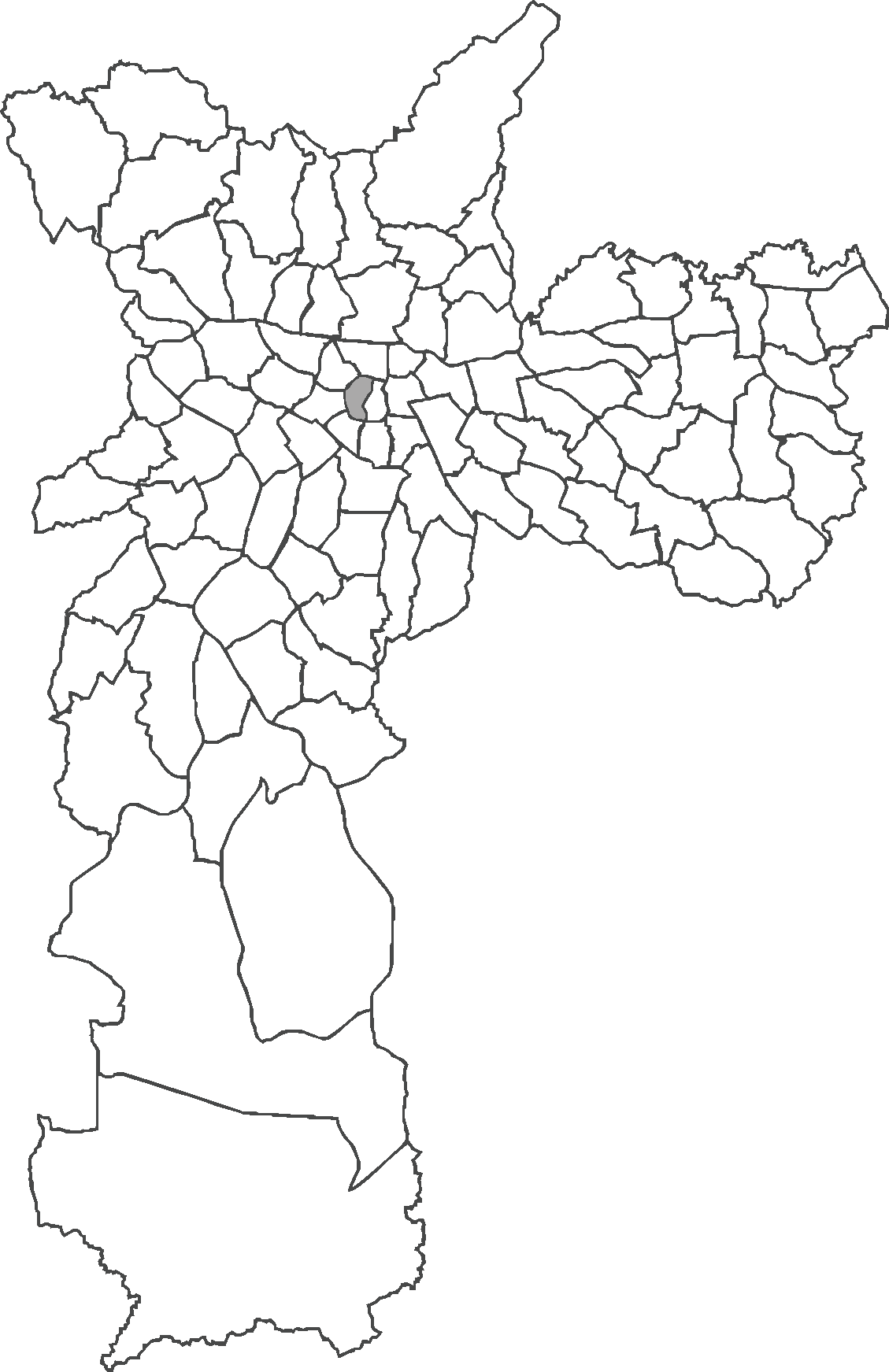
- Location in the city of São Paulo
- Country: Brazil
- State: São Paulo
- City: São Paulo

Government
  - Type: Subprefecture
  - Subprefect: Amauri Luiz Pastorello

Area
  - Total: 2.3 km^{2} (0.89 sq mi)

Population (2000)
  - Total: 47.718
  - Density: 20.747/km^{2} (53.73/sq mi)
- HDI: 0.901 –high
- Website: Subprefecture of Sé

República (English: Republic) is one of 96 districts in the city of São Paulo, Brazil. As of a 2022 census, it had a total of population of 60,720.

== History ==
In the early 20th century, the district consisted mainly of country estates (chácaras), the largest belonging to Marshal José Arouche de Toledo Rendon. Over time the area gained streets that still exist in the city's urban layout, such as Sete de Abril, Coronel Xavier de Toledo and Ypiranga (now Avenida Ipiranga), among others. A large open area was also established for military exercises, which later became the Largo do Arouche. Another area served as a place of entertainment for the residents of São Paulo, where horseback games and bull races were held: the Largo dos Curros, today the Praça da República, which gave the district its name.

== Demographics ==
Demographic evolution of the República district

== Neighbourhoods ==
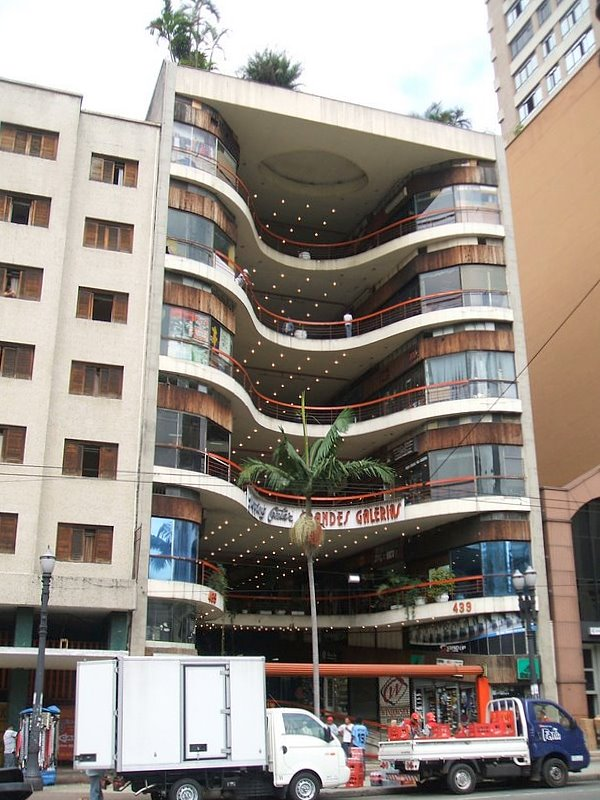
The Galeria do Rock, located in the district

Neighbourhoods of República:

- Anhangabaú
- Vila Buarque (part)
- República
- Santa Ifigênia
