= Vila das Belezas (São Paulo Metro) =

São Paulo Metro station

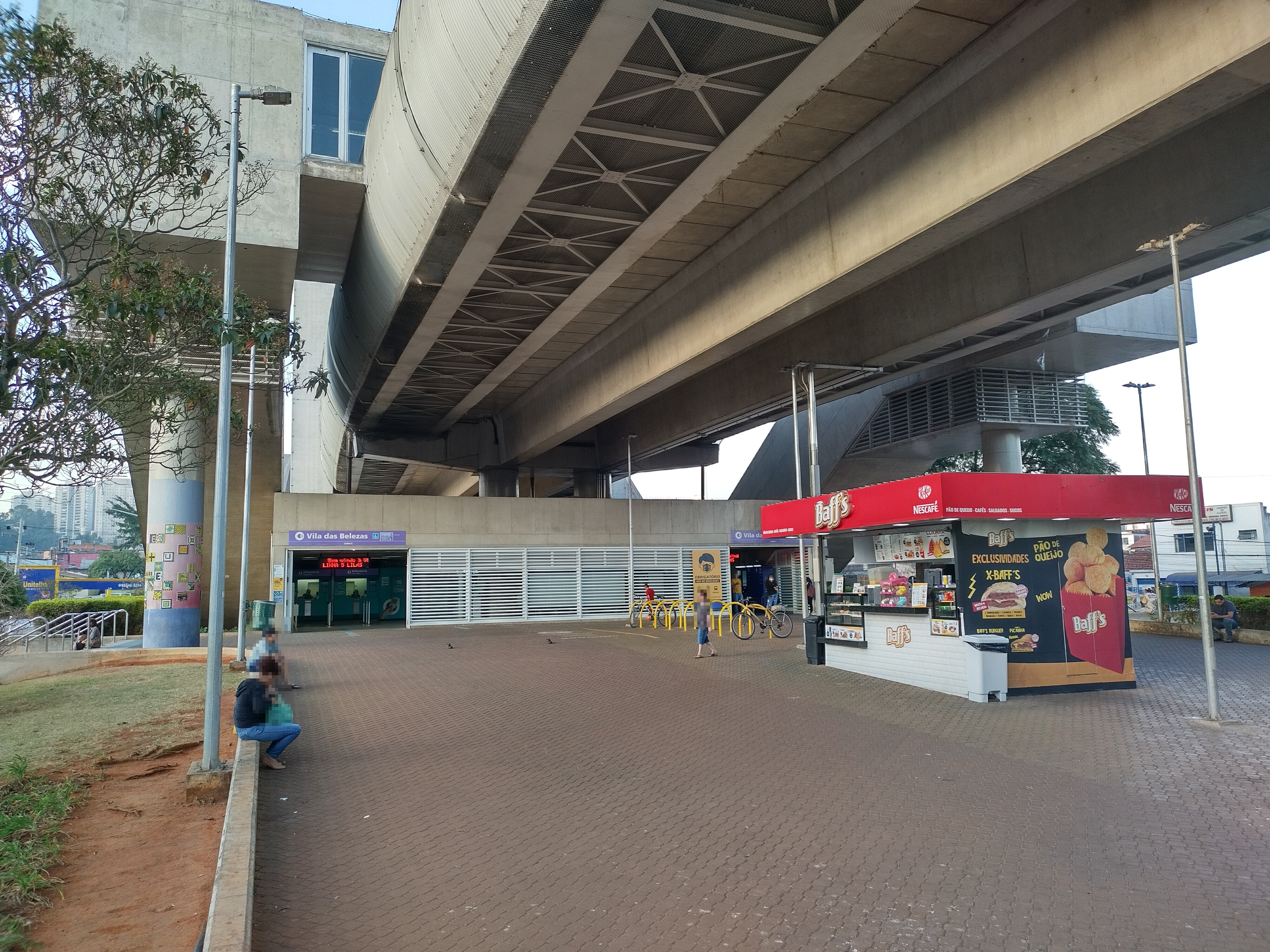
- Entrance of the station

General information
- Location: Av. das Belezas, 880, Vila das Belezas; São Paulo; Brazil
- Coordinates: 23°38′26″S 46°44′45″W
- Owner: Government of the State of São Paulo
- Operator: Companhia do Metropolitano de São Paulo (2002–2018); Motiva Linhas 5 e 17 (2018–present)
- Platforms: Side platforms

Construction
- Structure type: Elevated
- Accessible: y
- Architect: Luiz Carlos Esteves

Other information
- Station code: VBE

History
- Opened: October 20, 2002

Services
Preceding station	São Paulo Metro	Following station
Campo Limpo towards Capão Redondo	Line 5	Giovanni Gronchi towards Chácara Klabin
Track layout
Location

Vila das Belezas is a metro station on Line 5 (Lilac) of the São Paulo Metro in the Vila Andrade district of São Paulo, Brazil.
