= Brooklin (São Paulo Metro) =

São Paulo Metro station

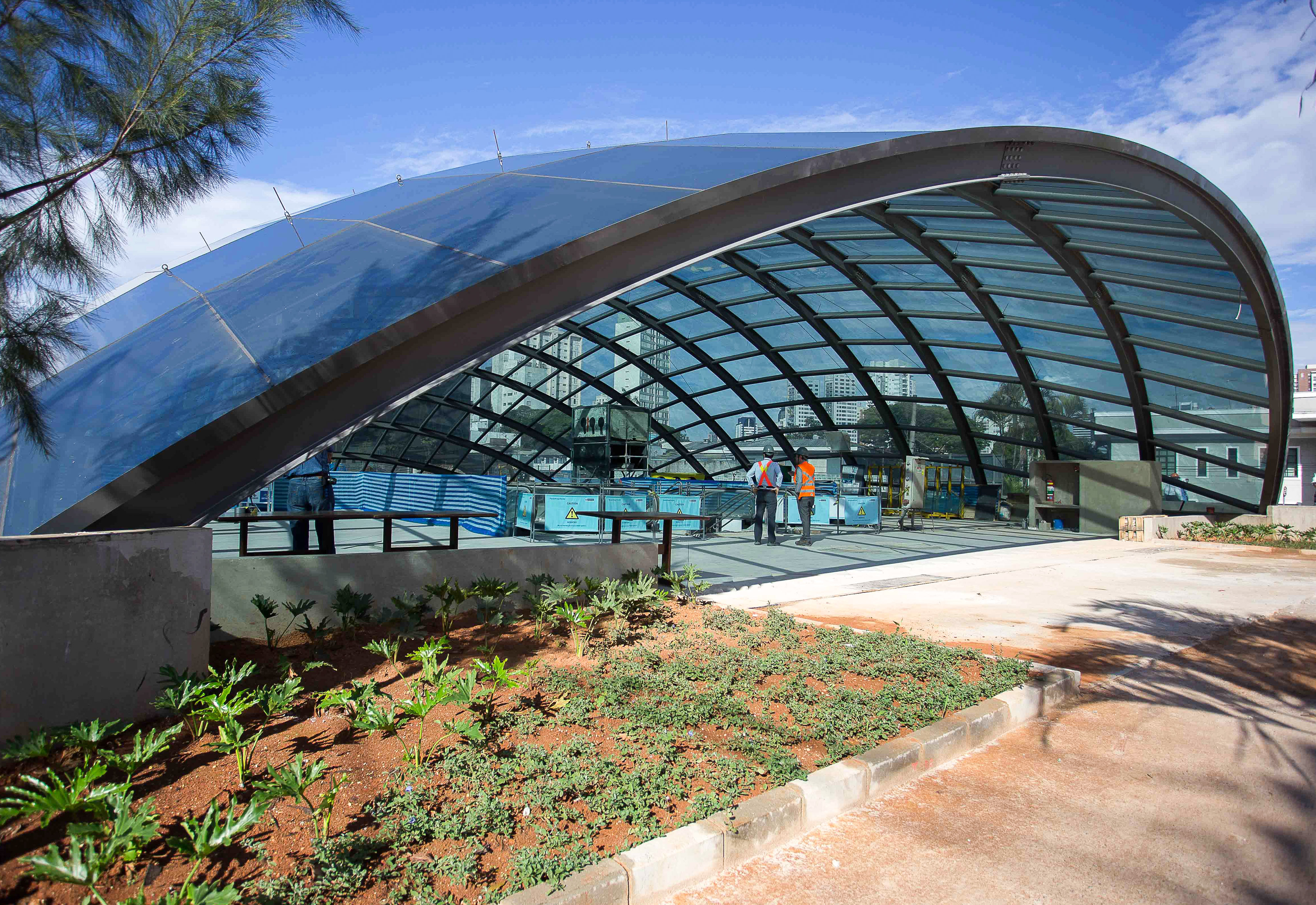
- Station during the end of the construction.

General information
- Location: Av. Santo Amaro, 5010, Santo Amaro; São Paulo; Brazil
- Coordinates: 23.627014°S 46.688333°W
- Owner: Government of the State of São Paulo
- Operator: Companhia do Metropolitano de São Paulo (2017–2018); Motiva Linhas 5 e 17 (2018–present)
- Platforms: Island platforms
- Connections: Santo Amaro–9 de Julho–Centro Bus Corridor; Diadema–Morumbi Metropolitan Corridor

Construction
- Structure type: Underground
- Accessible: y

Other information
- Station code: BRK

History
- Opened: September 6, 2017
- Former names: Brooklin-Campo Belo

Services
Preceding station	São Paulo Metro	Following station
Borba Gato towards Capão Redondo	Line 5	Campo Belo towards Chácara Klabin
Track layout
Location

Brooklin is a metro station on Line 5 (Lilac) of the São Paulo Metro in the Campo Belo district of São Paulo, Brazil.
