= Campo Limpo =

Campo Limpo may refer to:

- Subprefecture of Campo Limpo, São Paulo
- Campo Limpo (district of São Paulo)
- Campo Limpo (São Paulo Metro)
- Campo Limpo Paulista, a municipality in the state of São Paulo
- Campo Limpo de Goiás, a municipality in the state of Goiás

== See also ==
- Roman Catholic Diocese of Campo Limpo
