= Alto da Boa Vista (São Paulo Metro) =

São Paulo Metro station

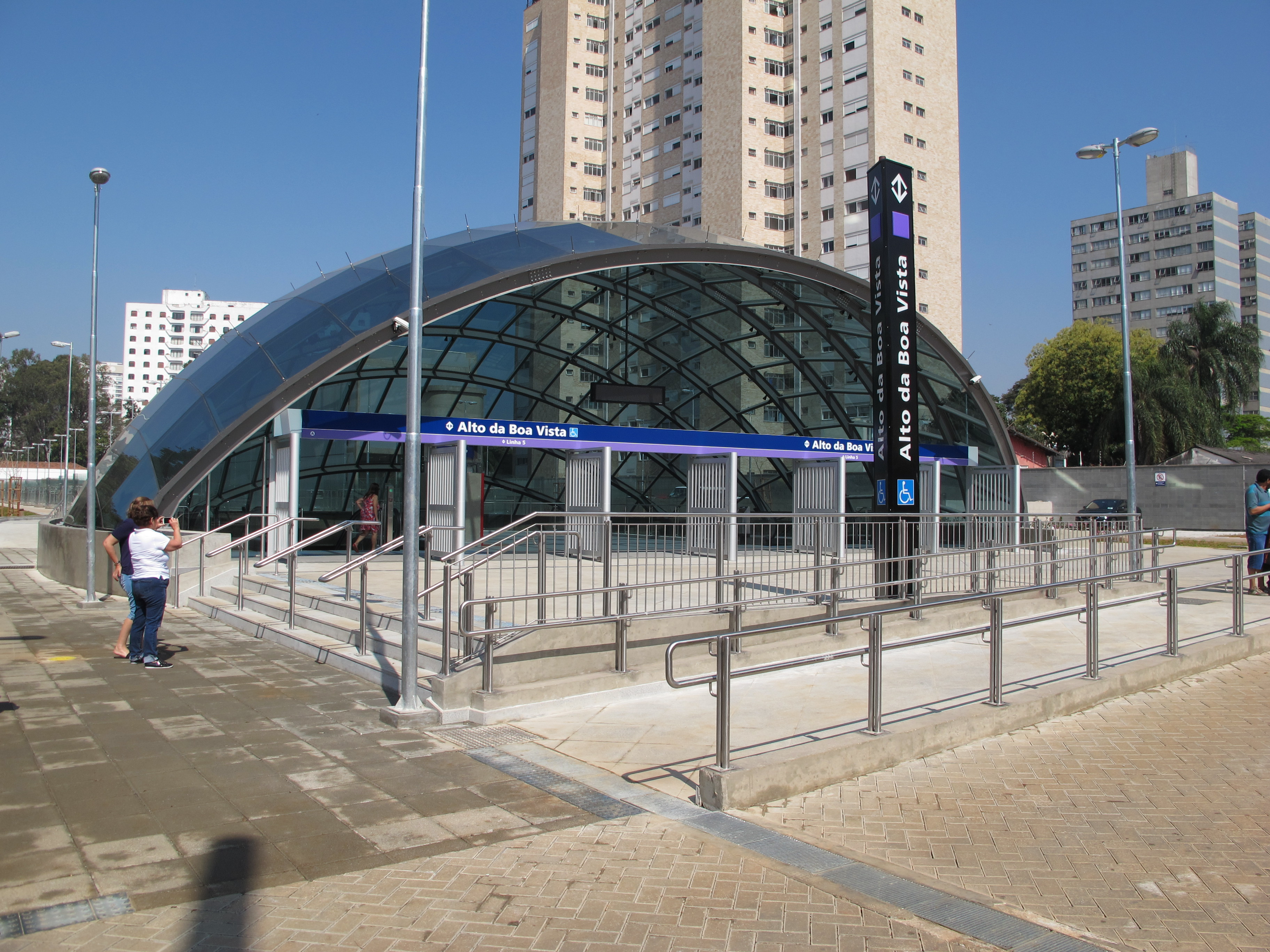
- Dome of the main entrance of the station.

General information
- Location: Av. Santo Amaro, 6960, Santo Amaro; São Paulo; Brazil
- Coordinates: 23.641944°S 46.699722°W
- Owner: Government of the State of São Paulo
- Operator: Companhia do Metropolitano de São Paulo (2017–2018); Motiva Linhas 5 e 17 (2018–present)
- Platforms: Island platforms

Construction
- Structure type: Underground
- Accessible: y

Other information
- Station code: ABV

History
- Opened: September 6, 2017

Services
Preceding station	São Paulo Metro	Following station
Adolfo Pinheiro towards Capão Redondo	Line 5	Borba Gato towards Chácara Klabin
Track layout
Location

Alto da Boa Vista is a metro station on Line 5 (Lilac) of the São Paulo Metro in the Santo Amaro district of São Paulo, Brazil.
