= Hospital São Paulo (São Paulo Metro) =

São Paulo Metro station

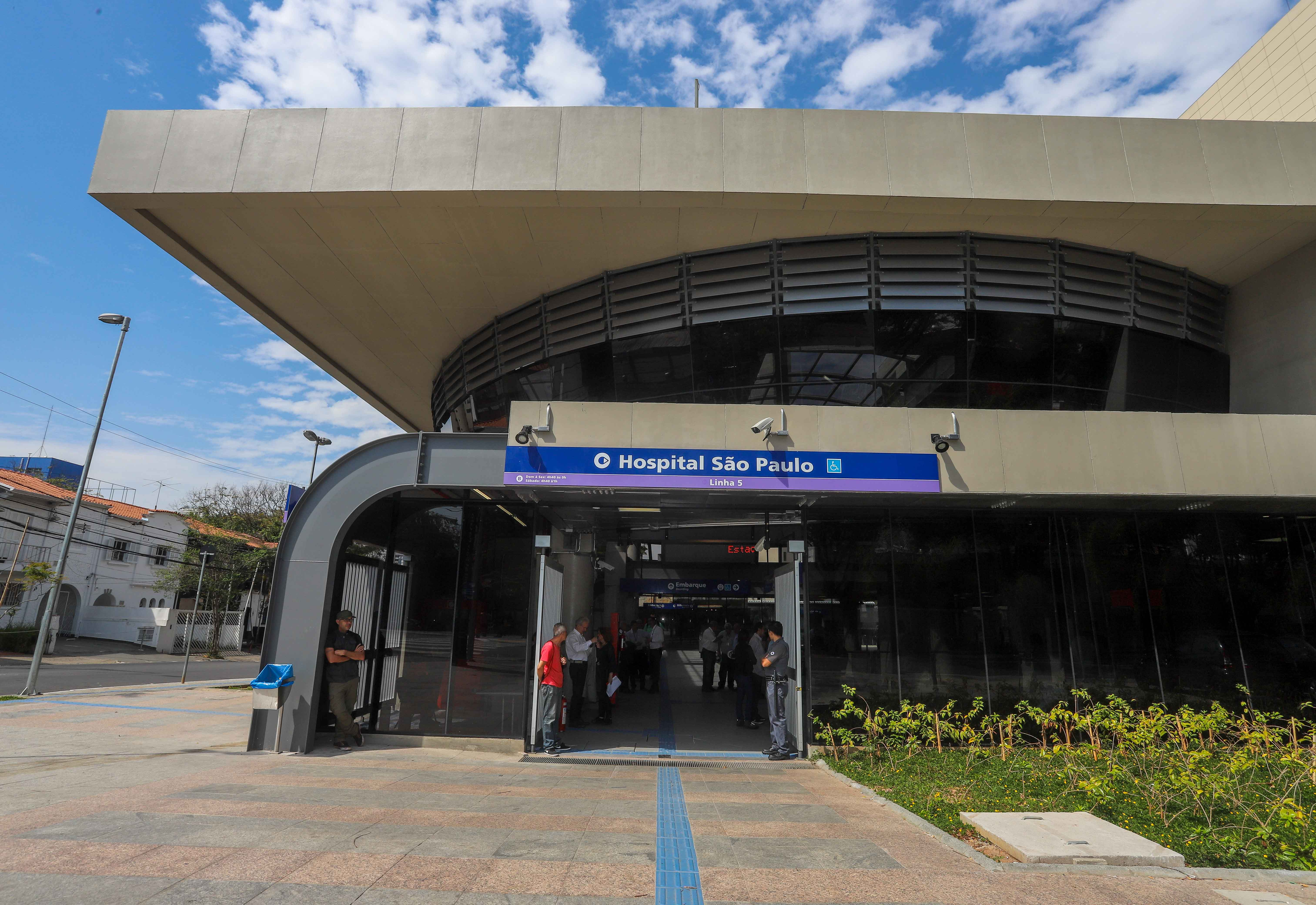
- Main entrance of the station

General information
- Location: R. Pedro de Toledo, 937, Vila Mariana; São Paulo
- Coordinates: 23.598431°S 46.645556°W
- Owner: Government of the State of São Paulo
- Operator: Motiva Linhas 5 e 17
- Platforms: Side platforms
- Connections: José Diniz–Ibirapuera–Santa Cruz Bus Corridor

Construction
- Structure type: Underground
- Accessible: y

Other information
- Station code: HSP

History
- Opened: 28 September 2018
- Former names: Vila Clementino

Services
Preceding station	São Paulo Metro	Following station
AACD-Servidor towards Capão Redondo	Line 5	Santa Cruz towards Chácara Klabin
Track layout
Location

Hospital São Paulo is a metro station on Line 5 (Lilac) of the São Paulo Metro in the Vila Mariana district of São Paulo, Brazil.
