= Adolfo Pinheiro (São Paulo Metro) =

São Paulo Metro station

Adolfo Pinheiro–Unisa
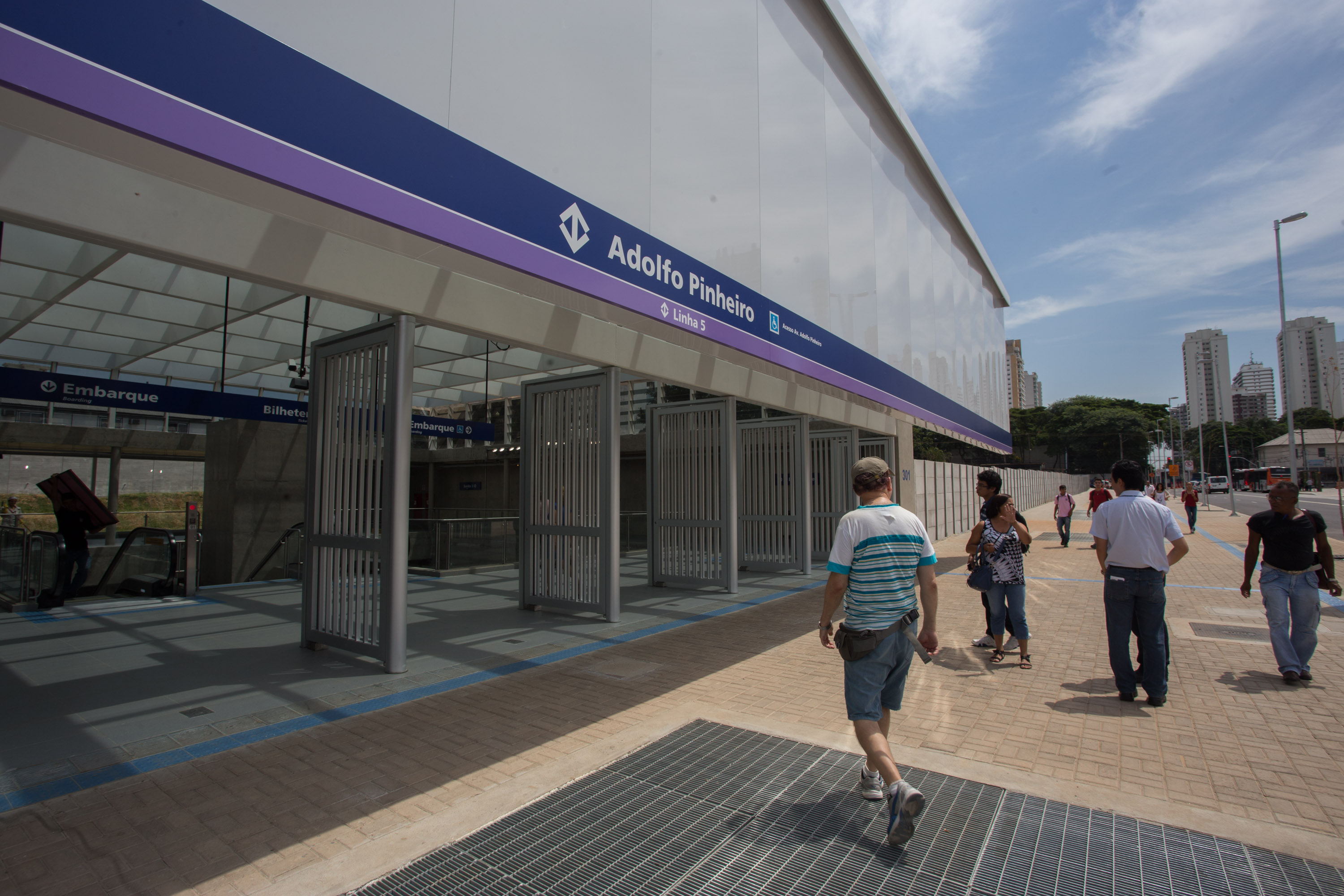
- Nameplate of the station.

General information
- Location: Avenida Adolfo Pinheiro; São Paulo; Brazil
- Coordinates: 23.6501°S 46.7042°W
- Owner: Government of the State of São Paulo
- Operator: Companhia do Metropolitano de São Paulo (2014–2018); Motiva Linhas 5 e 17 (2018–present)
- Platforms: Side platforms
- Connections: Santo Amaro–9 de Julho–Centro Bus Corridor

Construction
- Structure type: Underground
- Accessible: y
- Architect: Roberto Mac Fadden and Mariana Viégas

Other information
- Station code: APN

History
- Opened: February 12, 2014

Services
Preceding station	São Paulo Metro	Following station
Largo Treze towards Capão Redondo	Line 5	Alto da Boa Vista towards Chácara Klabin
Track layout
Location

Adolfo Pinheiro, also known as Adolfo Pinheiro–Unisa for sponsorship reasons, is a metro station on Line 5 (Lilac) of the São Paulo Metro in the Santo Amaro district of São Paulo, Brazil. The station was inaugurated on February 12, 2014, with limited working hours and started working full-time on August 4, 2014.
