= Moema (São Paulo Metro) =

São Paulo Metro station

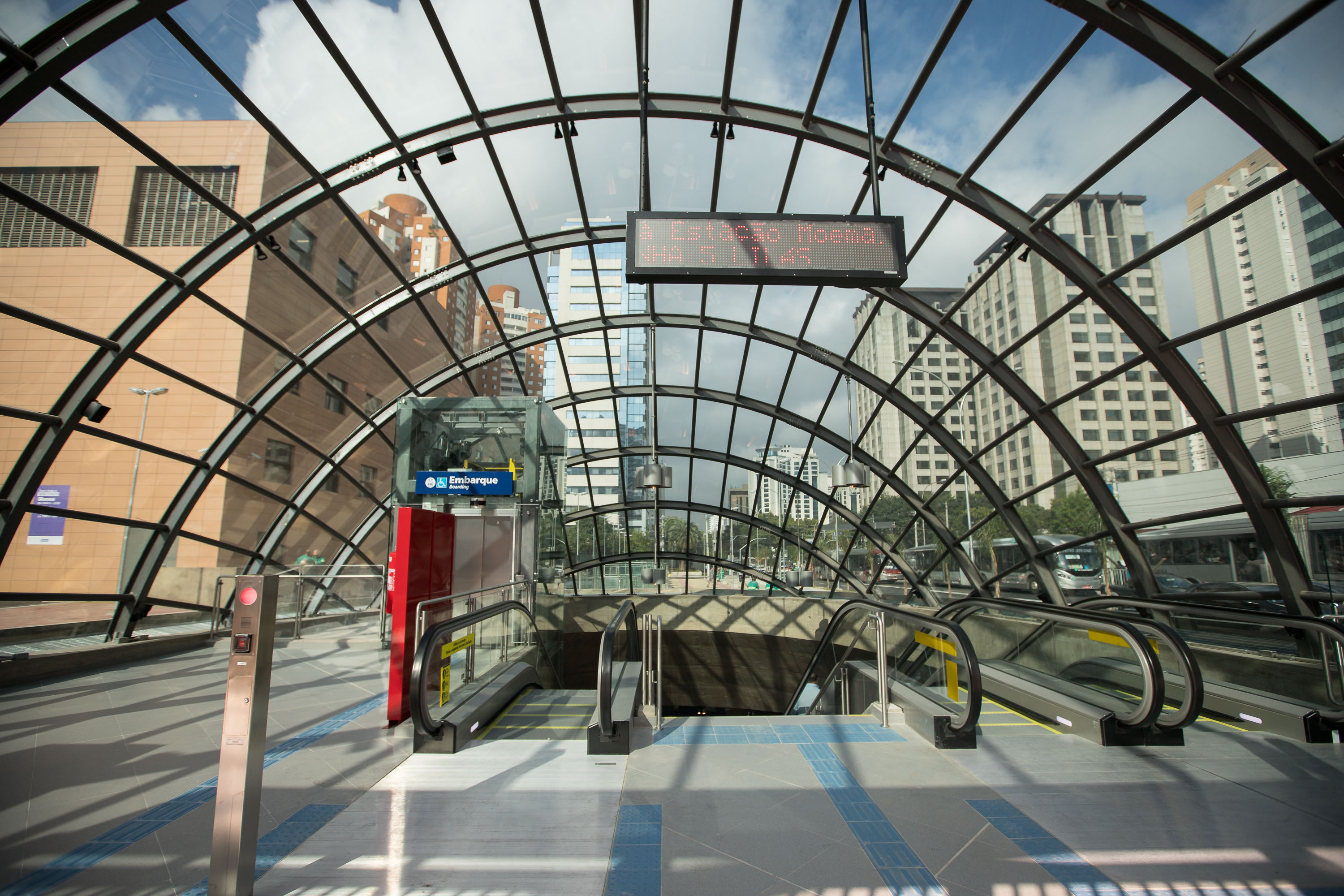

General information
- Location: Av. Ibirapuera × Av. Divino Salvador, Moema; São Paulo; Brazil
- Coordinates: 23°36′13″S 46°39′43″W
- Owner: Government of the State of São Paulo
- Operator: Companhia do Metropolitano de São Paulo (2018); Motiva Linhas 5 e 17 (2018–present)
- Platforms: Side platforms
- Connections: José Diniz–Ibirapuera–Santa Cruz Bus Corridor

Construction
- Structure type: Underground
- Accessible: y

Other information
- Station code: MOE

History
- Opened: 5 April 2018

Services
Preceding station	São Paulo Metro	Following station
Eucaliptos towards Capão Redondo	Line 5	AACD-Servidor towards Chácara Klabin
Future services
Hélio Pelegrino towards Santa Marina	Line 20 (proposed)	Rubem Berta towards Pref. Celso Daniel-Santo André
Track layout
Location

Moema is a metro station on Line 5 (Lilac) of the São Paulo Metro in the Moema district of São Paulo, Brazil. On 31 March 2018, during the opening of Line 13-Jade of CPTM, Governor of São Paulo Geraldo Alckmin confirmed the opening of Moema station in 5 April 2018, alongside the opening of Oscar Freire station in 4 April 2018 and other stations of Line 15-Silver monorail in the same week.
