= AACD-Servidor (São Paulo Metro) =

São Paulo Metro station

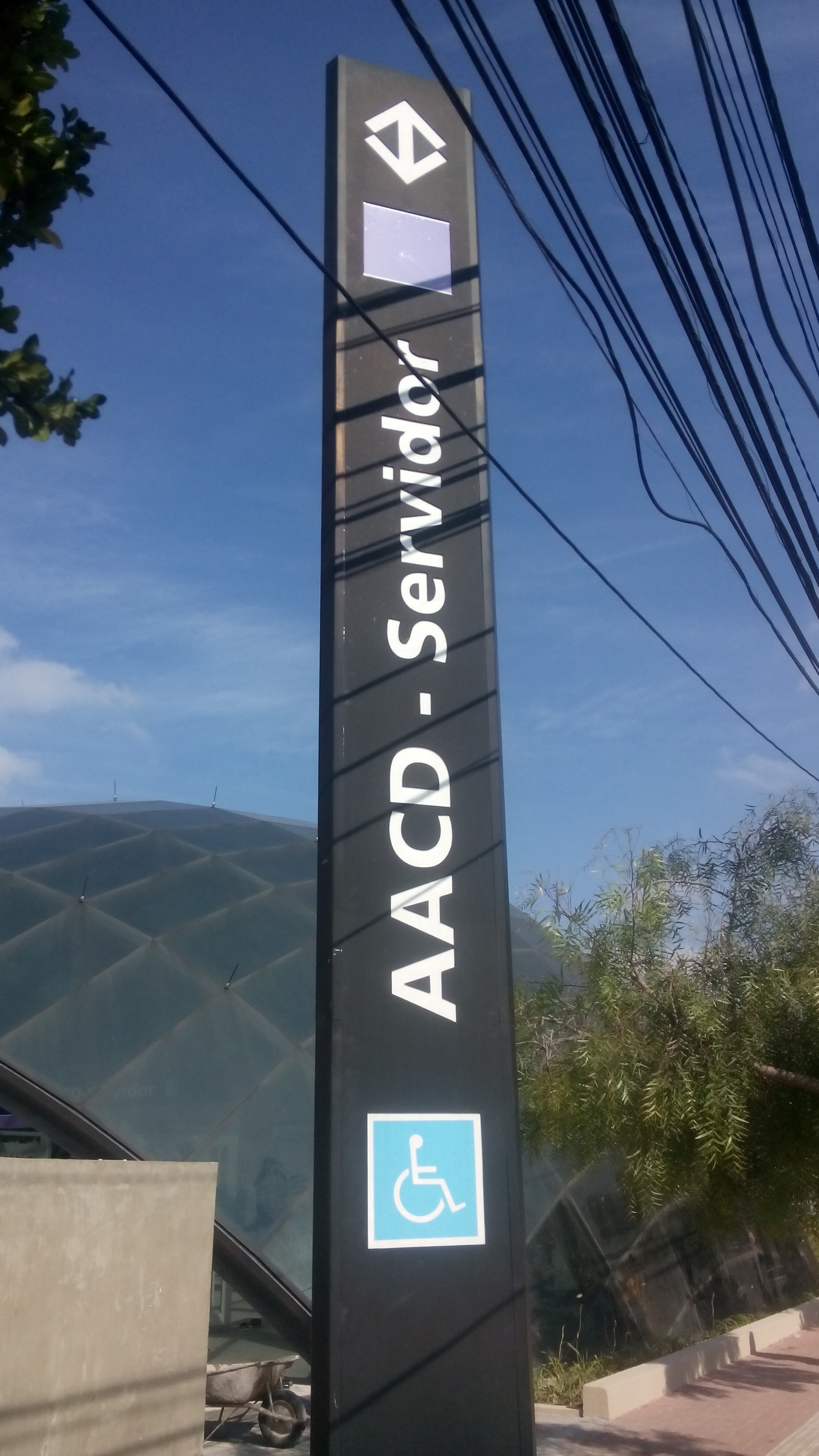
- Totem of station in May 2018

General information
- Location: R. Pedro de Toledo, 1601, Moema; São Paulo; Brazil
- Coordinates: 23.597778°S 46.651944°W
- Owner: Government of the State of São Paulo
- Operator: Motiva Linhas 5 e 17
- Platforms: Side platforms

Construction
- Structure type: Underground
- Accessible: y

Other information
- Station code: SER

History
- Opened: 31 August 2018
- Former names: Hospital Servidor Público; Servidor

Services
Preceding station	São Paulo Metro	Following station
Moema towards Capão Redondo	Line 5	Hospital São Paulo towards Chácara Klabin
Track layout
Location

AACD-Servidor is a metro station on Line 5 (Lilac) of the São Paulo Metro in the Moema district of São Paulo, Brazil.
