= Largo Treze (São Paulo Metro) =

São Paulo Metro station

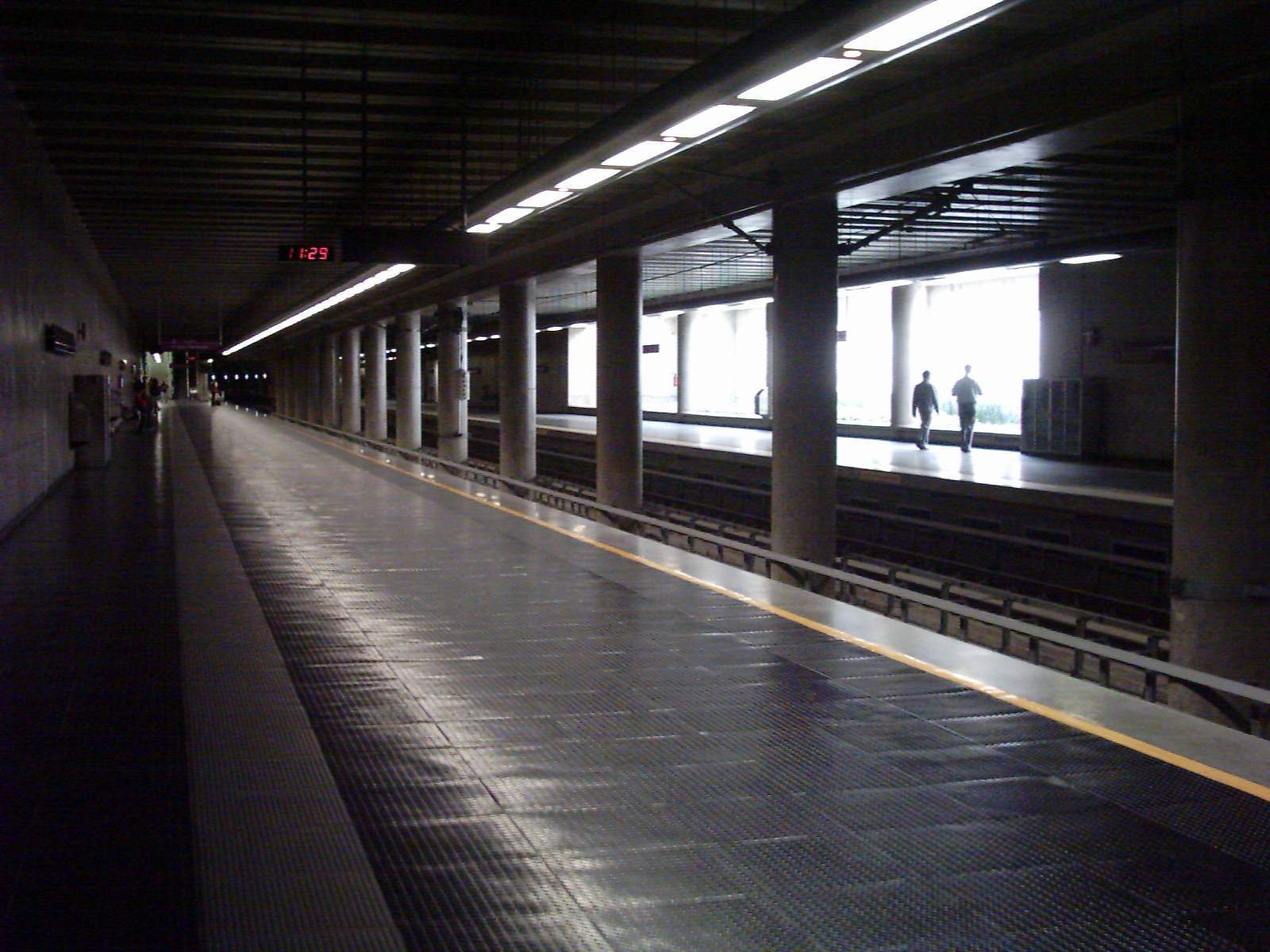
- Largo Treze Station

General information
- Location: Av. Padre José Maria × R. Barão do Rio Branco, Santo Amaro; São Paulo; Brazil
- Coordinates: 23°39′16″S 46°42′37″W
- Owner: Government of the State of São Paulo
- Operator: Companhia do Metropolitano de São Paulo (2002–2018); Motiva Linhas 5 e 17 (2018–present)
- Platforms: Side platforms
- Connections: Santo Amaro Bus Terminal; Santo Amaro–9 de Julho–Centro Bus Corridor

Construction
- Structure type: Underground
- Accessible: y
- Architect: Luiz Carlos Esteves

Other information
- Station code: LTR

History
- Opened: October 20, 2002

Services
Preceding station	São Paulo Metro	Following station
Santo Amaro towards Capão Redondo	Line 5	Adolfo Pinheiro towards Chácara Klabin
Track layout
Location

Largo Treze is a metro station on Line 5 (Lilac) of the São Paulo Metro in the Santo Amaro district of São Paulo, Brazil. It was the terminus station of the line until February 12, 2014, when the Adolfo Pinheiro was inaugurated.
