= Campo Limpo (São Paulo Metro) =

São Paulo Metro station

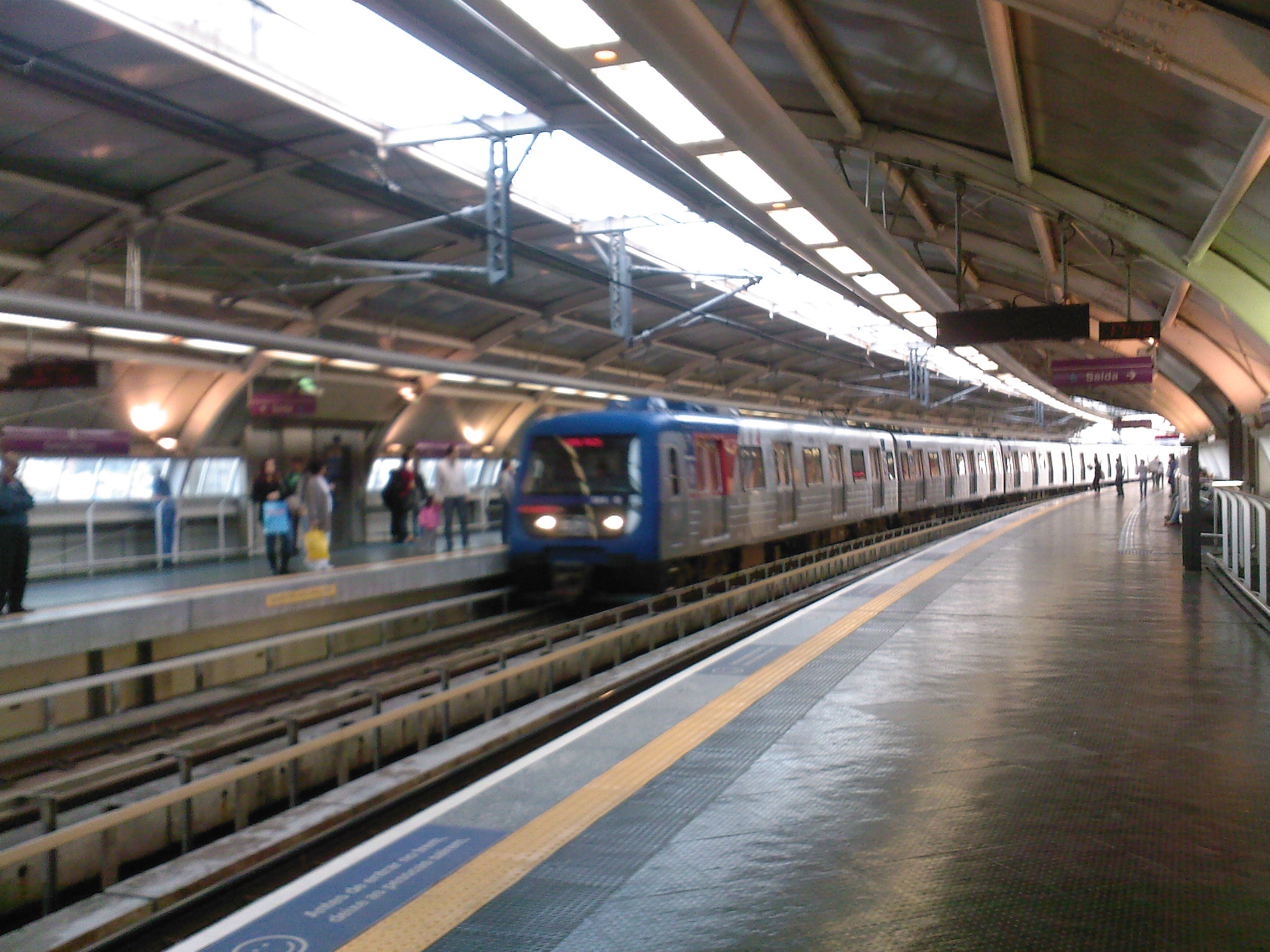
- Platforms of the station

General information
- Location: Rua Noanama, 85, Campo Limpo; São Paulo; Brazil
- Coordinates: 23°38′58″S 46°45′33″W
- Owner: Government of the State of São Paulo
- Operator: Companhia do Metropolitano de São Paulo (2002–2018); Motiva Linhas 5 e 17 (2018–present)
- Platforms: Side platforms
- Connections: Campo Limpo Bus Terminal

Construction
- Structure type: Elevated
- Accessible: y
- Architect: Luiz Carlos Esteves

Other information
- Station code: CPL

History
- Opened: October 20, 2002

Services
Preceding station	São Paulo Metro	Following station
Capão Redondo Terminus	Line 5	Vila das Belezas towards Chácara Klabin
Track layout
Location

Campo Limpo is a metro station on Line 5 (Lilac) of the São Paulo Metro in the Campo Limpo district of São Paulo, Brazil.

== EMTU lines ==
The following EMTU bus lines can be accessed:

Line	Prefix	City	Neighborhood
056	TRO	Embú	Centro
178	TRO	Embú	Jardim Vazame
178	BI1	Embú	Jardim Nossa Senhora de Fátima
245	TRO	Taboão da Serra	Jardim São Judas Tadeu
343	TRO	Embú	Jardim do Colégio
