= São Paulo Metro P stock =

Class of electric multiple units

P stock
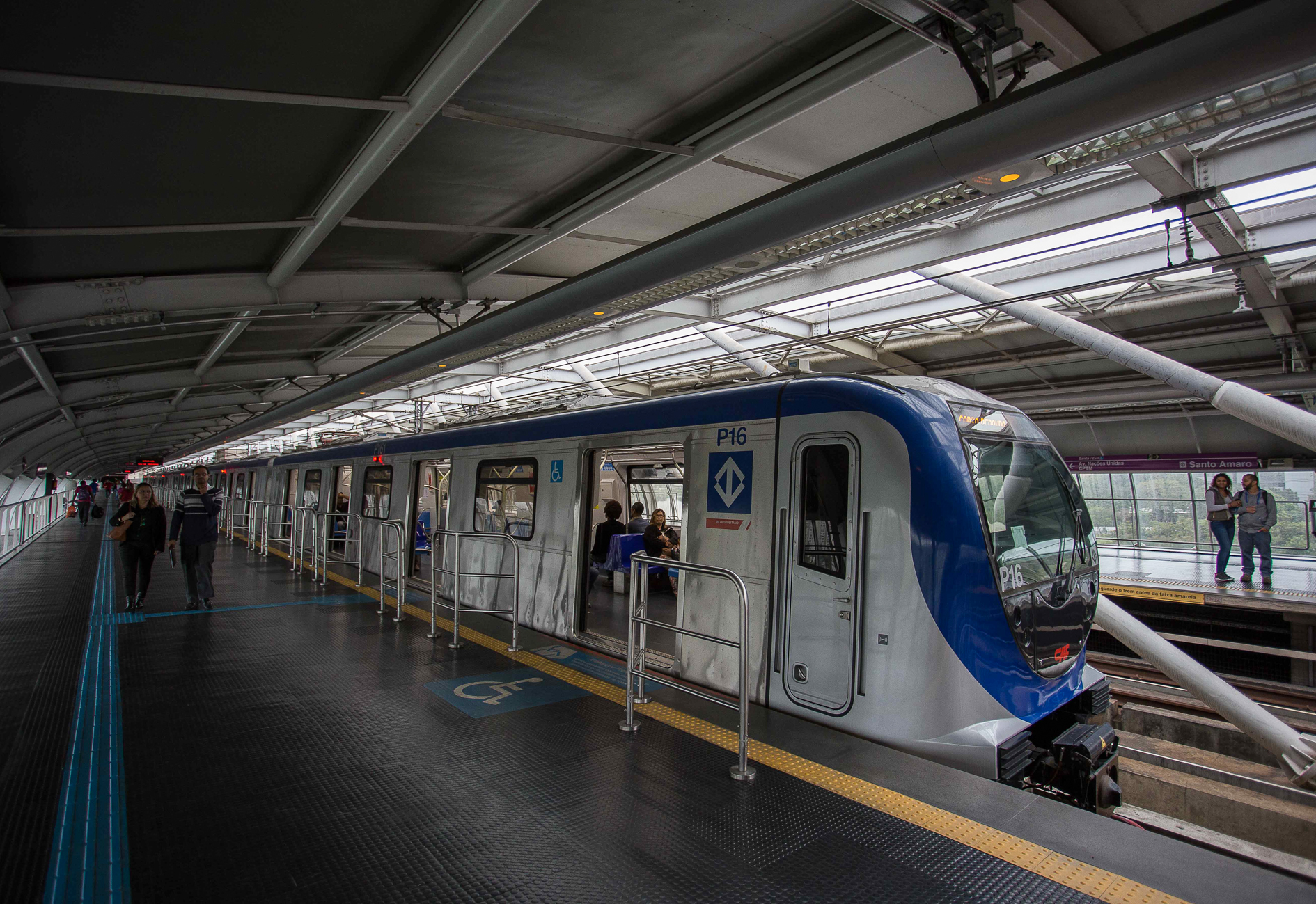
- A P16 train on Line 5 at Santo Amaro station

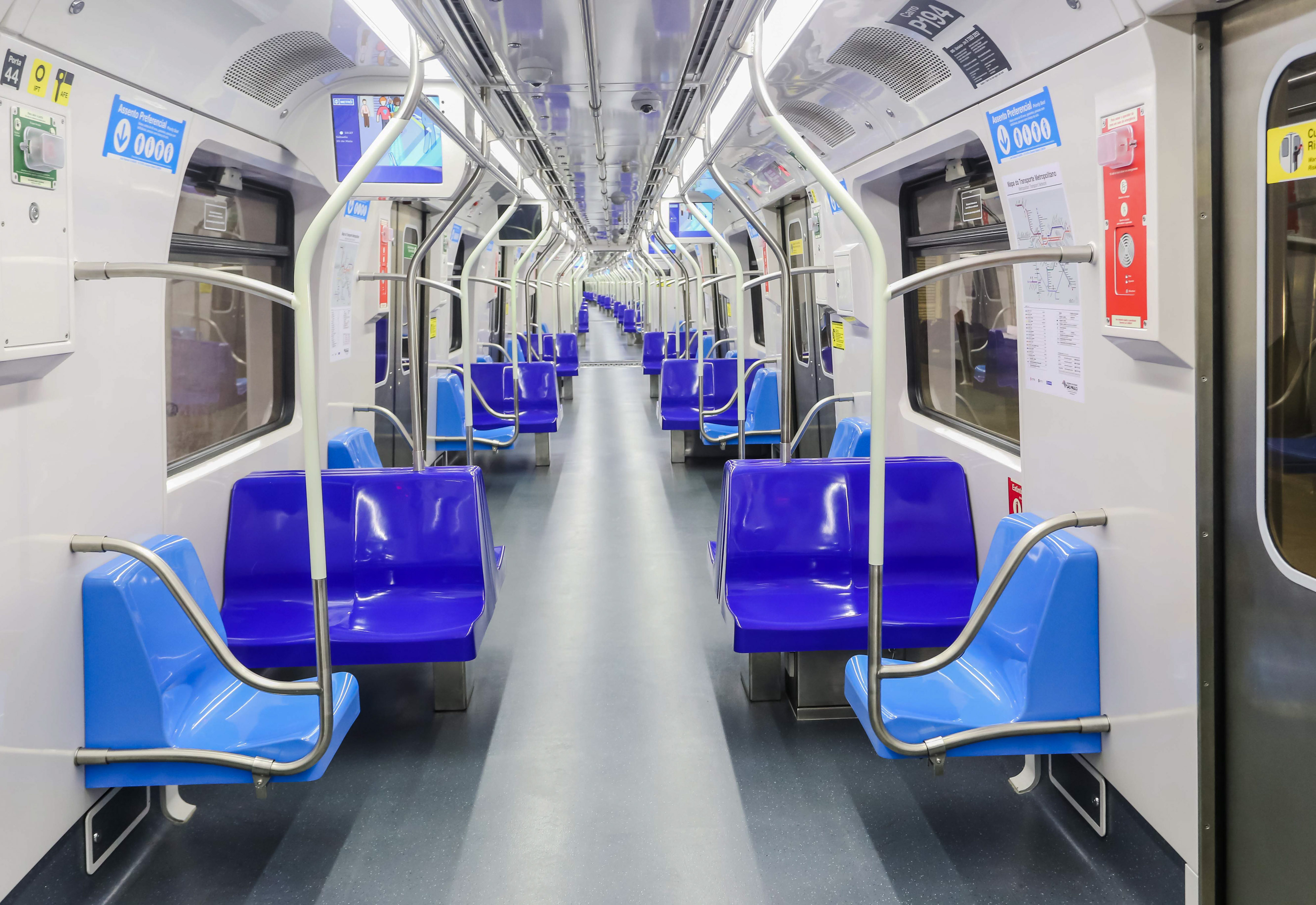
- In service: 2017–present
- Manufacturer: CAF
- Built at: Hortolândia, São Paulo
- Constructed: 2013–2014
- Entered service: 14 March 2017
- Number built: 26 sets
- Number in service: 26 sets
- Formation: 6-car sets (A–B–B–B–B–A)
- Fleet numbers: 509–534
- Capacity: 1,502 (if 6 passengers/m²); 1,922 (if 8 passengers/m²)
- Operator: ViaMobilidade
- Depots: Capão Redondo; Guido Caloi
- Line served: Line 5 (São Paulo Metro)

Specifications
- Car body construction: Stainless steel
- Train length: 132.72 m (435 ft 5 in)
- Car length: 22.36 m (73 ft 4 in) (A cars); 22 m (72 ft 2 in) (B cars)
- Width: 2.8 m (9 ft 2 in)
- Height: 3,776 mm (12 ft 4.7 in)
- Floor height: 1,105 mm (3 ft 7.5 in)
- Platform height: 1,105 mm (3 ft 7.5 in)
- Entry: Level
- Wheel diameter: 870–780 mm (34–31 in) (new–worn)
- Maximum speed: 80 km/h (50 mph)
- Traction system: Mitsubishi Electric MAP-194-15V249 IGBT–VVVF
- Traction motors: 24 × Mitsubishi Electric MB-5145-A 185 kW (248 hp) asynchronous 3-phase AC
- Power output: 4,440 kW (5,950 hp)
- Transmission: 7.52 : 1 gear ratio (2-stage reduction)
- Acceleration: 1.12 m/s^{2} (3.7 ft/s^{2})
- Deceleration: 1.2 m/s^{2} (3.9 ft/s^{2}) (service); 1.5 m/s^{2} (4.9 ft/s^{2}) (emergency)
- Electric systems: 1,500 V DC overhead line
- Current collection: Pantograph
- UIC classification: Bo′Bo′+Bo′Bo′+Bo′Bo′+Bo′Bo′+Bo′Bo′+Bo′Bo′
- Bogies: Hard "H"
- Braking systems: Regenerative and Rheostatic (in stations); Pneumatic (friction)
- Safety system: Cityflo 650 CBTC
- Coupling system: Scharfenberg
- Track gauge: 1,435 mm (4 ft 8 1/2 in) standard gauge

The São Paulo Metro P stock is a class of electric multiple units built by Construcciones y Auxiliar de Ferrocarriles between 2013 and 2014 to complement the rolling stock of Line 5-Lilac during the 11.5 km (7.1 mi) expansion between stations Largo Treze and Chácara Klabin. It was acquired by Companhia do Metropolitano de São Paulo and operated by it until 2018. Currently, it is operated by ViaMobilidade.

Despite being delivered in 2014, the trains only began operating in 2017, when the CBTC system was fully installed on the line.

== General characteristics ==
The São Paulo Metro P stock has lots of differences with the original Line 5 rolling stock (F stock). Amongst them:

- Internal LED lighting;
- Open gangway;
- Lower levels of internal and external noise;
- Security cameras in all of the cars, besides one internal and one external on the driving cabin;
- CBTC signalling;
- Tilting windows which can only be unlocked in case of problems with the air-conditioning system;
- Double air-conditioning system in each car;
- LCD monitors;
- Anti-slip control system on the brakes for smoother stopping;
- Seats for obese people in A cars;
- Nickel-cadmium batteries on board, friendlier to the environment compared to the lead-acid batteries of the old fleet;
- Fire detection by optical systems;
- Fire extinguishing system by nebulized water;
- Systems required for operation at GoA4 maximum automation level (UTO).

== History ==
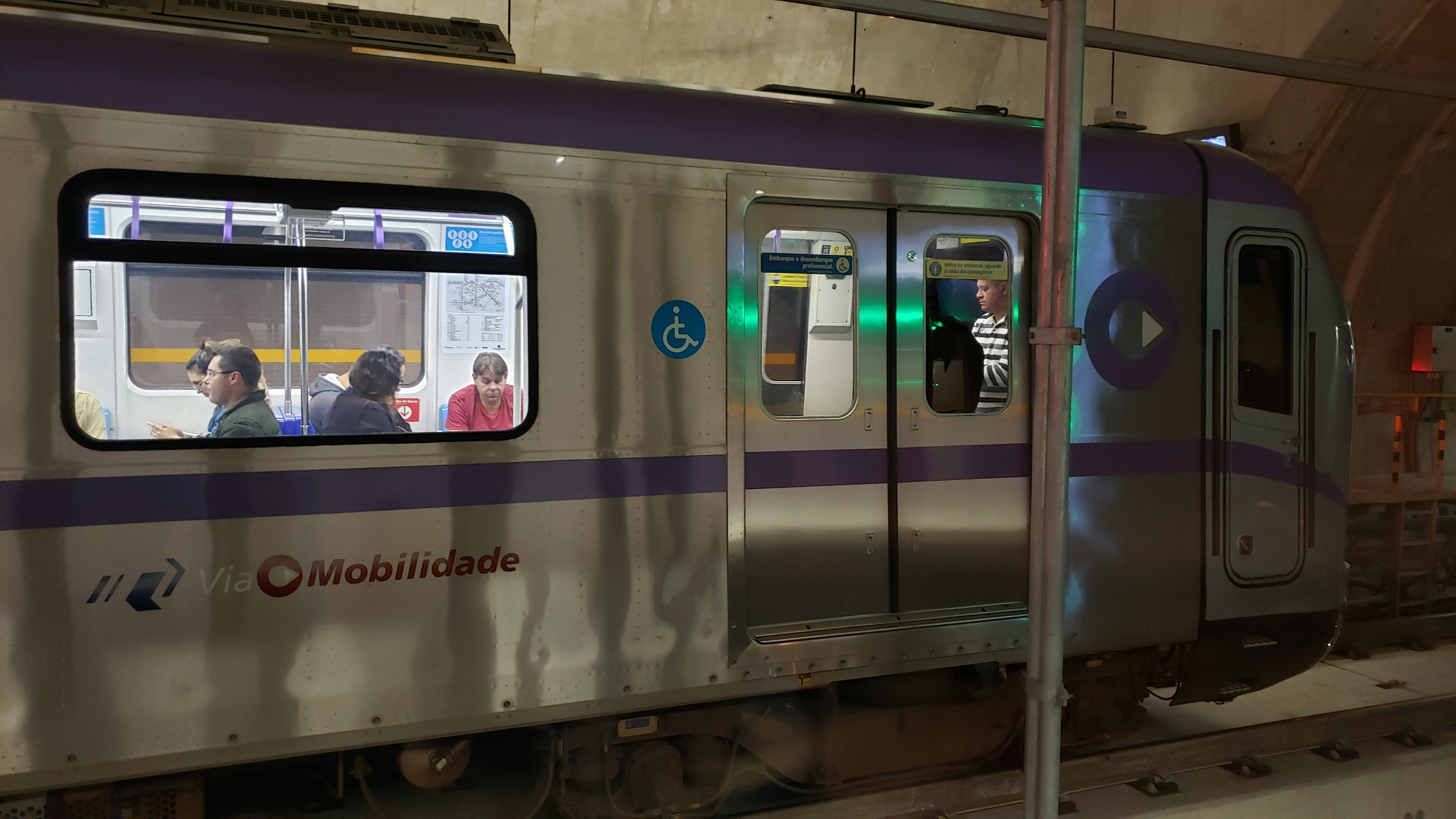
A repainted train for ViaMobilidade standards stopped at Santa Cruz station in October 2019.

When the Line 5-Lilac extension officially began in 2011, the Metro company launched a bid for the acquisition of a new train fleet to supply the demand of the new branch, which the only operational stock, the F stock, would be unable to transport by itself.

The deadline for this bidding was stipulated in 2 years, as the line expansion was estimated for 2014 and the trains needed at least 2 months of tests to be considered safe enough. However, the extension was only completed in 2019, the CBTC system installed only in 2017 and the trains, delivered on time, had to be parked in Capão Redondo and Jabaquara Yards (which needed adaptations due to the difference of the track gauge) and in the CAF factory in Hortolândia, as the expansion of Capão Redondo Yard hadn't been completed yet.

It was only in 2017, with the instaling of the CBTC signalling that the fleet could finally begin operating, relieving the intense demand over the F stock, which was already beginning to show defects. (predicted by the Metro and one of the reasons for the acquisition of the P stock). In 2018, with the concession of Line 5 to ViaMobilidade, both stocks were transferred, receiving new adhesives and painting to reflect the change of the operators.

== See also ==
- Line 5 (São Paulo Metro)
- São Paulo Metro
- ViaMobilidade
