= Line 5 (São Paulo Metro) =

São Paulo Metro Line 5 (Lilac)

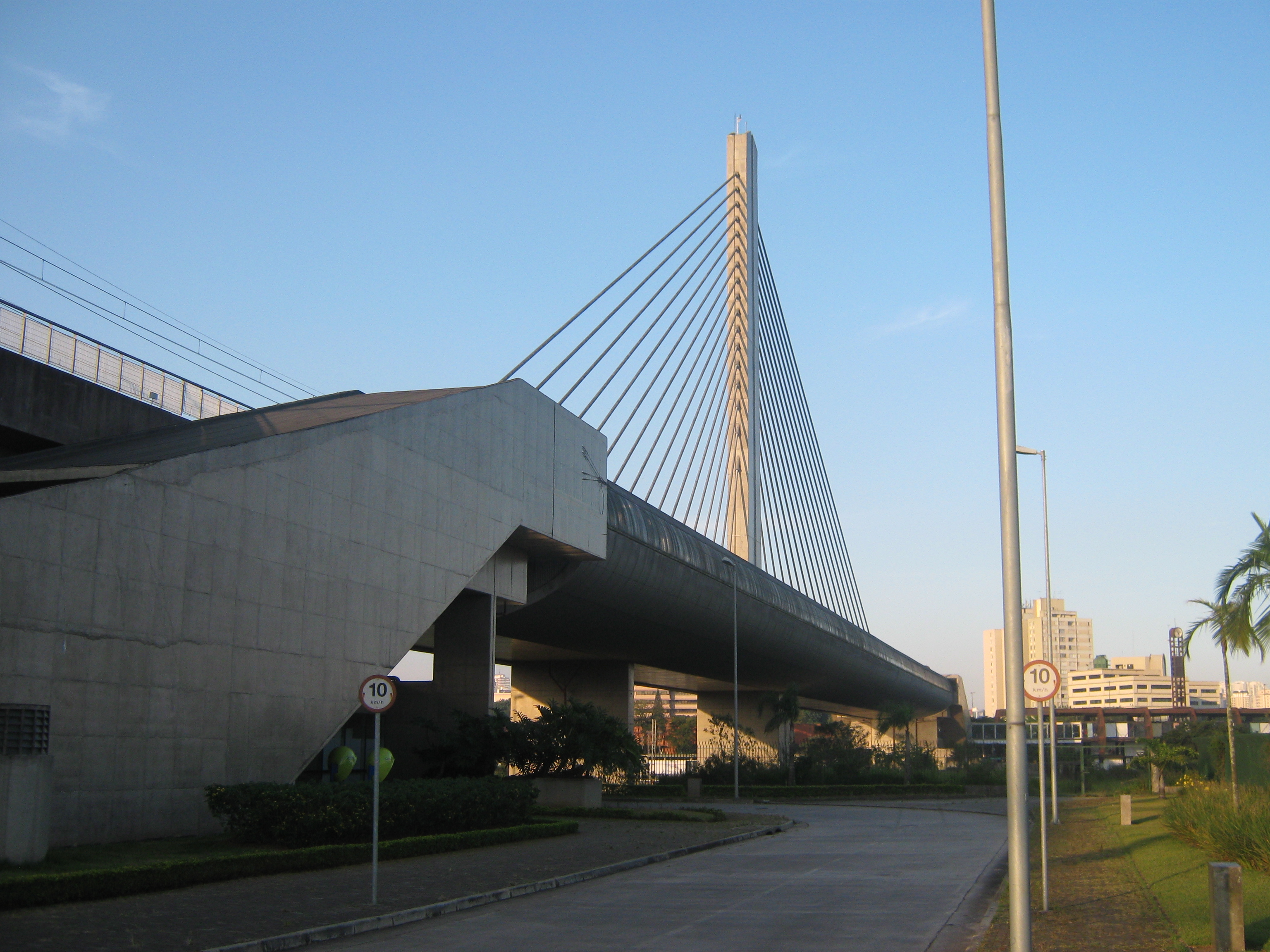
- Santo Amaro Station

Overview
- Status: Operational
- Owner: Government of the State of São Paulo
- Locale: São Paulo, Brazil
- Termini: Capão Redondo; Chácara Klabin
- Connecting lines: Current: Planned: 20
- Stations: 17 in operation 2 in project
- Website: trilhos.motiva.com.br/viamobilidade5

Service
- Type: Rapid transit
- System: São Paulo Metro
- Operator: Motiva Linhas 5 e 17
- Depot(s): Capão Redondo rail yard Guido Caloi rail yard
- Rolling stock: 48 Alstom/CAF/Siemens F stock (8 trains); 156 CAF P stock (26 trains)

History
- Commenced: 1998
- Opened: October 20, 2002; 23 years ago
- Last extension: September 28, 2018

Technical
- Line length: 19.9 km (12.4 mi)
- Track gauge: 1,435 mm (4 ft 8 1/2 in) standard gauge
- Electrification: Overhead line, 1,500 V DC
- Operating speed: 80 km/h (50 mph)
- Signalling: Bombardier CITYFLO 650 CBTC

Line 5 (Lilac) (Portuguese: Linha 5–Lilás) is one of the six lines that make up the São Paulo Metro and one of the 13 lines that make up the Metropolitan Rail Transportation Network. The line transports about 600,000 people every business day, and since August 2018 it is operated by the private company Motiva Linhas 5 e 17.

The southern section of the line, between Largo Treze and Capão Redondo was completed in 2002 and was envisioned as a railway line of the CPTM called Line G. The project was transferred to the São Paulo Metro and renamed to Line 5 - Lilac. A northern extension connecting it with the rest of the São Paulo Metro network started construction 2009 with a completion deadline of 2013. The project stalled due to issues with property acquisition and restarted in 2011. The completion deadline of the extension has been delayed several times, but it has been reached on 8 April 2019.

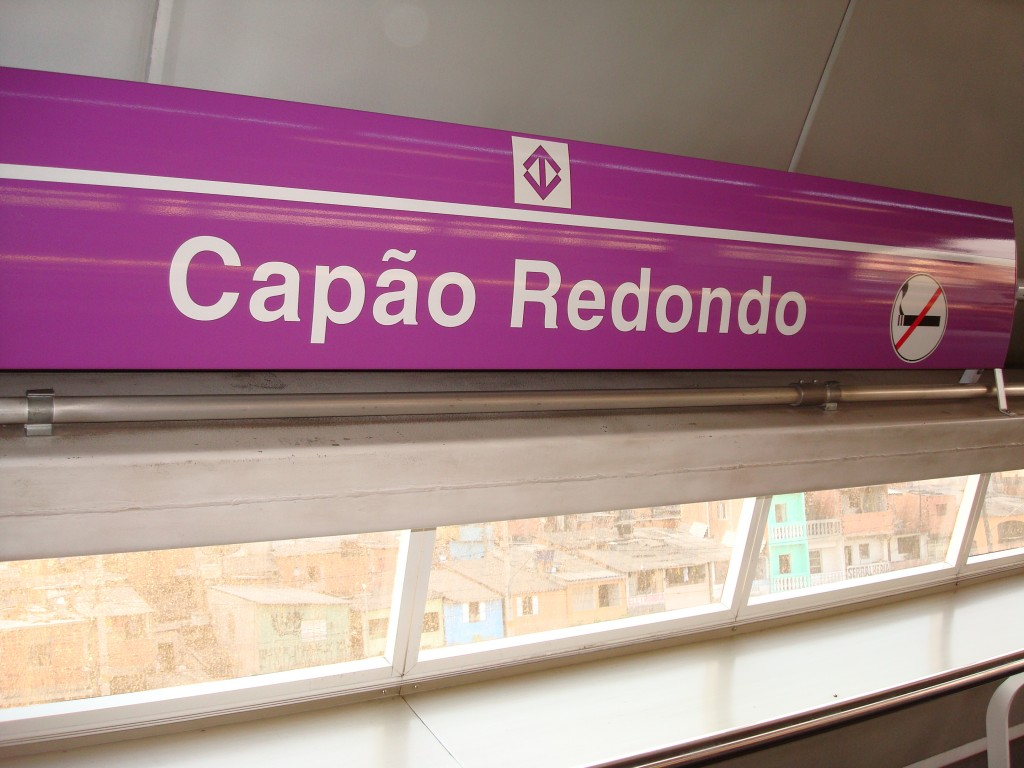
Identification placard at Capão Redondo station

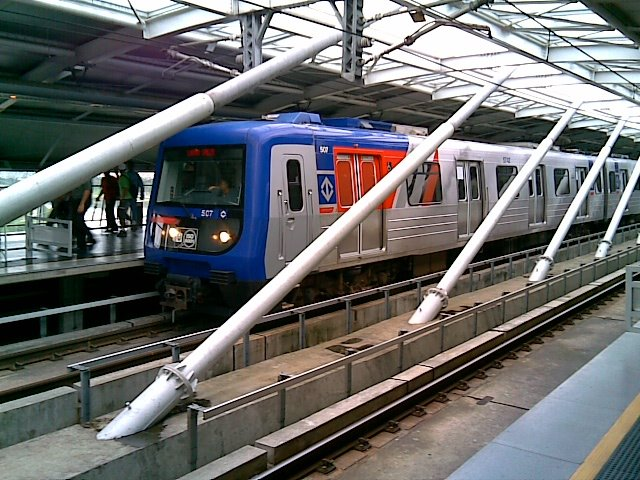
Alstom train in Line 5

== Stations ==
=== Operational ===
There are currently 17 operational stations on the Capão Redondo ↔ Chácara Klabin stretch:

Code	Station	Platforms	Position	Connections	District
TBA	Jardim Ângela	TBA	Underground	Jardim Ângela Bus Terminal	Capão Redondo
TBA	Comendador Sant'Anna	TBA	Elevated	-	Capão Redondo
CPR	Capão Redondo	Side platforms	Elevated	Capão Redondo Bus Terminal	Capão Redondo
CPL	Campo Limpo	Side platforms	Elevated	Campo Limpo Bus Terminal	Campo Limpo
VBE	Vila das Belezas	Side platforms	Elevated	-	Vila Andrade
GGR	Giovanni Gronchi	Side platforms	Elevated	João Dias Bus Terminal; Itapecerica–João Dias–Santo Amaro Bus Corridor	Vila Andrade
STA	Santo Amaro	Side platforms	Elevated	Guido Caloi Bus Terminal	Santo Amaro
LTR	Largo Treze	Side platforms	Underground	Santo Amaro Bus Terminal; Santo Amaro–9 de Julho–Centro Bus Corridor	Santo Amaro
APN	Adolfo Pinheiro	Side platforms	Underground	Santo Amaro–9 de Julho–Centro Bus Corridor	Santo Amaro
ABV	Alto da Boa Vista	Island platform	Underground	-	Santo Amaro
BGA	Borba Gato	Island platform	Underground	Santo Amaro–9 de Julho–Centro Bus Corridor	Santo Amaro
BRK	Brooklin	Island platform	Underground	Santo Amaro–9 de Julho–Centro Bus Corridor; Diadema–Morumbi Metropolitan Corridor	Campo Belo
CPB	Campo Belo	Island platform	Underground	Line 17 (São Paulo Metro)	Campo Belo
ECT	Eucaliptos	Side platforms	Underground	José Diniz–Ibirapuera–Santa Cruz Bus Corridor	Moema
MOE	Moema	Side platforms	Underground	20 (Planned); José Diniz–Ibirapuera–Santa Cruz Bus Corridor	Moema
SER	AACD–Servidor	Side platforms	Underground	-	Moema
HSP	Hospital São Paulo	Side platforms	Underground	José Diniz–Ibirapuera–Santa Cruz Bus Corridor	Vila Mariana
SCZ	Santa Cruz	Side platforms	Underground	José Diniz–Ibirapuera–Santa Cruz Bus Corridor	Vila Mariana
CKL	Chácara Klabin	Side platforms	Underground	Line 2 (São Paulo Metro)	Vila Mariana

Extensions from Capão Redondo to Jardim Ângela are planned.

== Technical specifications ==
The line operates with 25 trains (out of 26 available) and is made-up by 17 stations, transporting about 600,000 people every business day. Eight additional trains are expected to be added to the line in 2020, after CBTC installation and other enhancements are completed.

It was the first line in the Sao Paulo Metro to utilize a 1500 V tension Catenary, Standard Gauge, beside trains with IGBT power conversion and 1.60 m (5 ft 3 in) wide doors. Santo Amaro station was the first in Brazil to be built on a cable-stayed bridge.

During the 11.5 km (7.1 mi) extension between Largo Treze and Chacara Klabin stations, three TBMs were used and 26 CAF trains were added to the line in addition to the eight Alstom trains originally available.

== Gallery ==
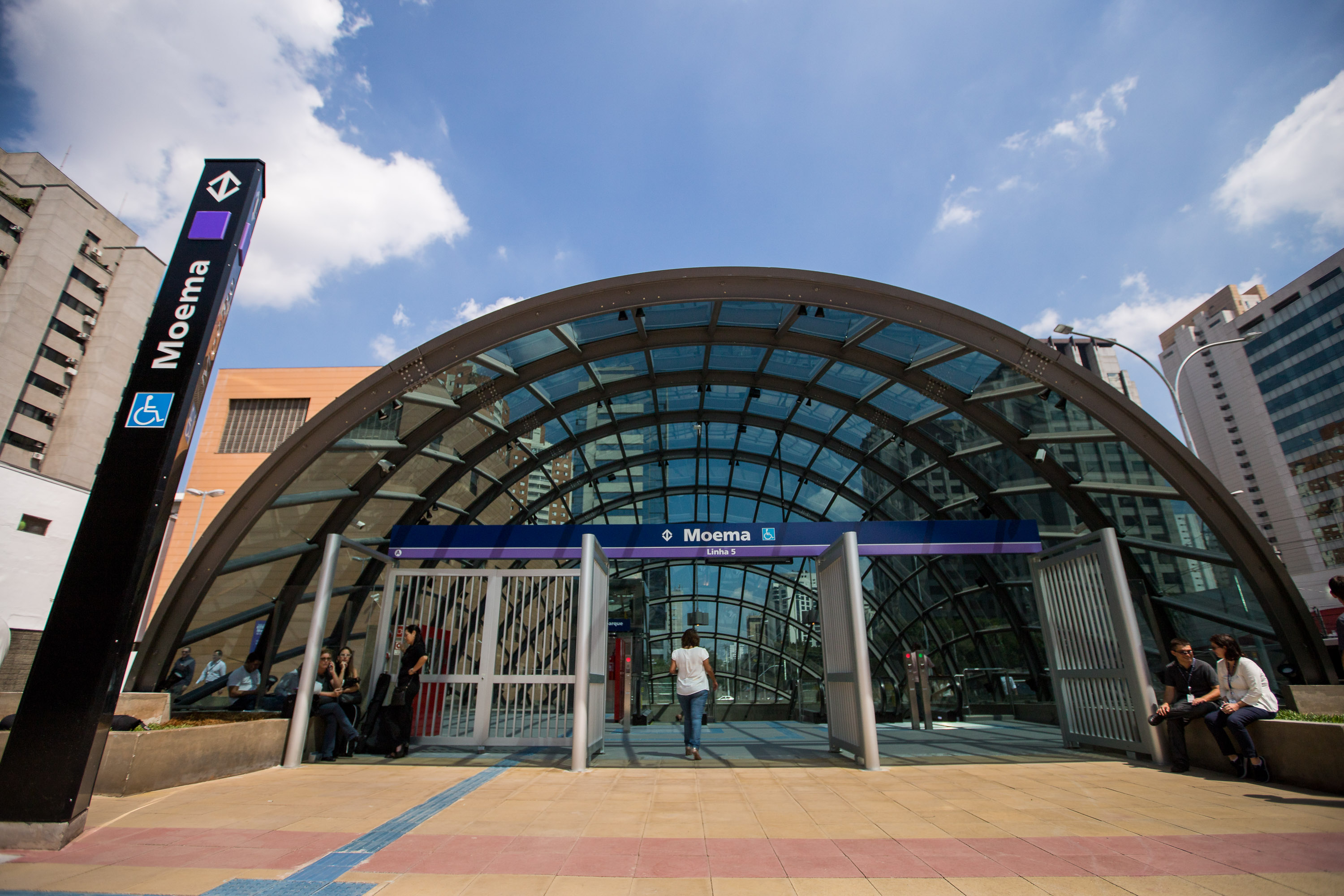
Moema Station, opened in 2018

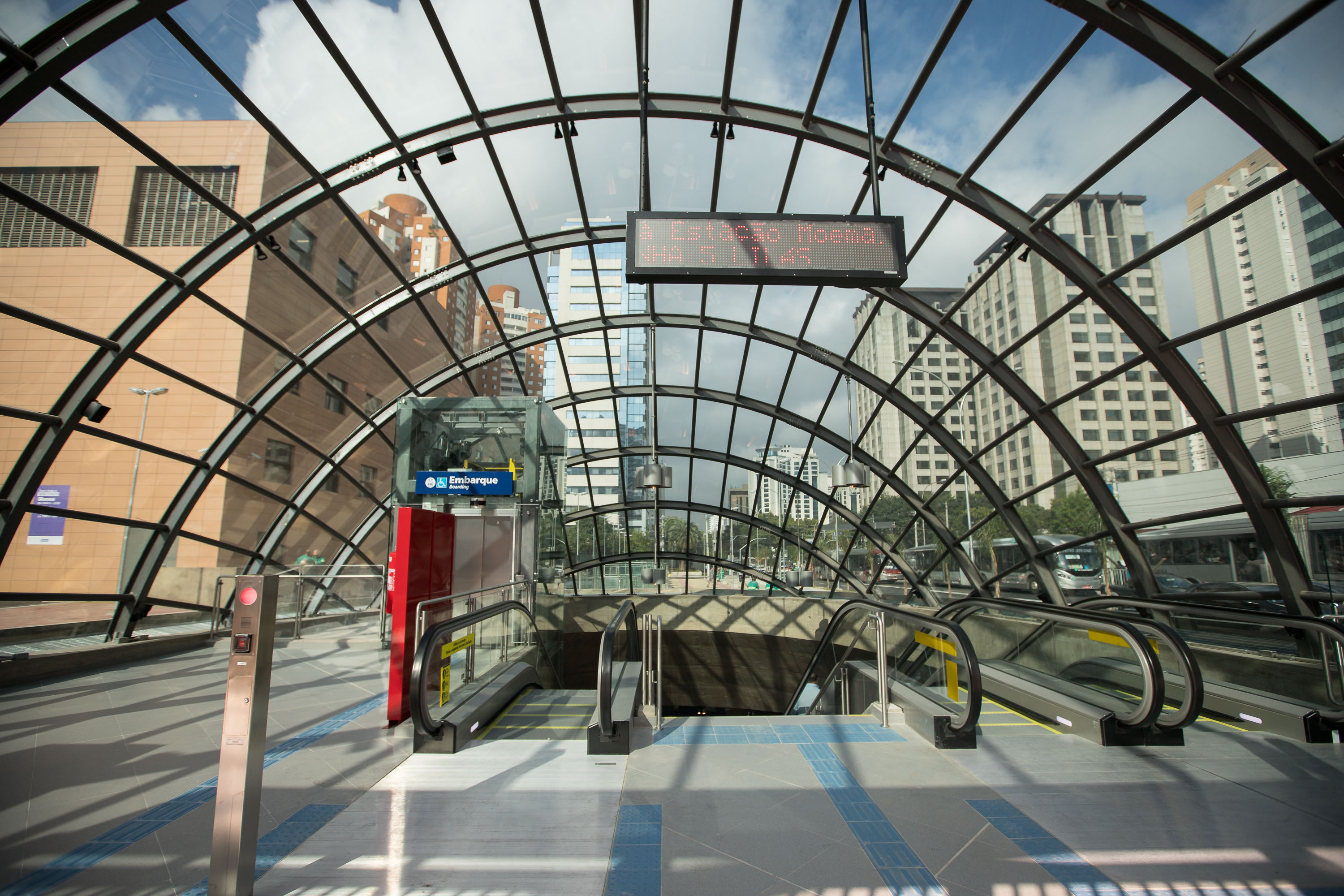
Moema Station, opened in 2018

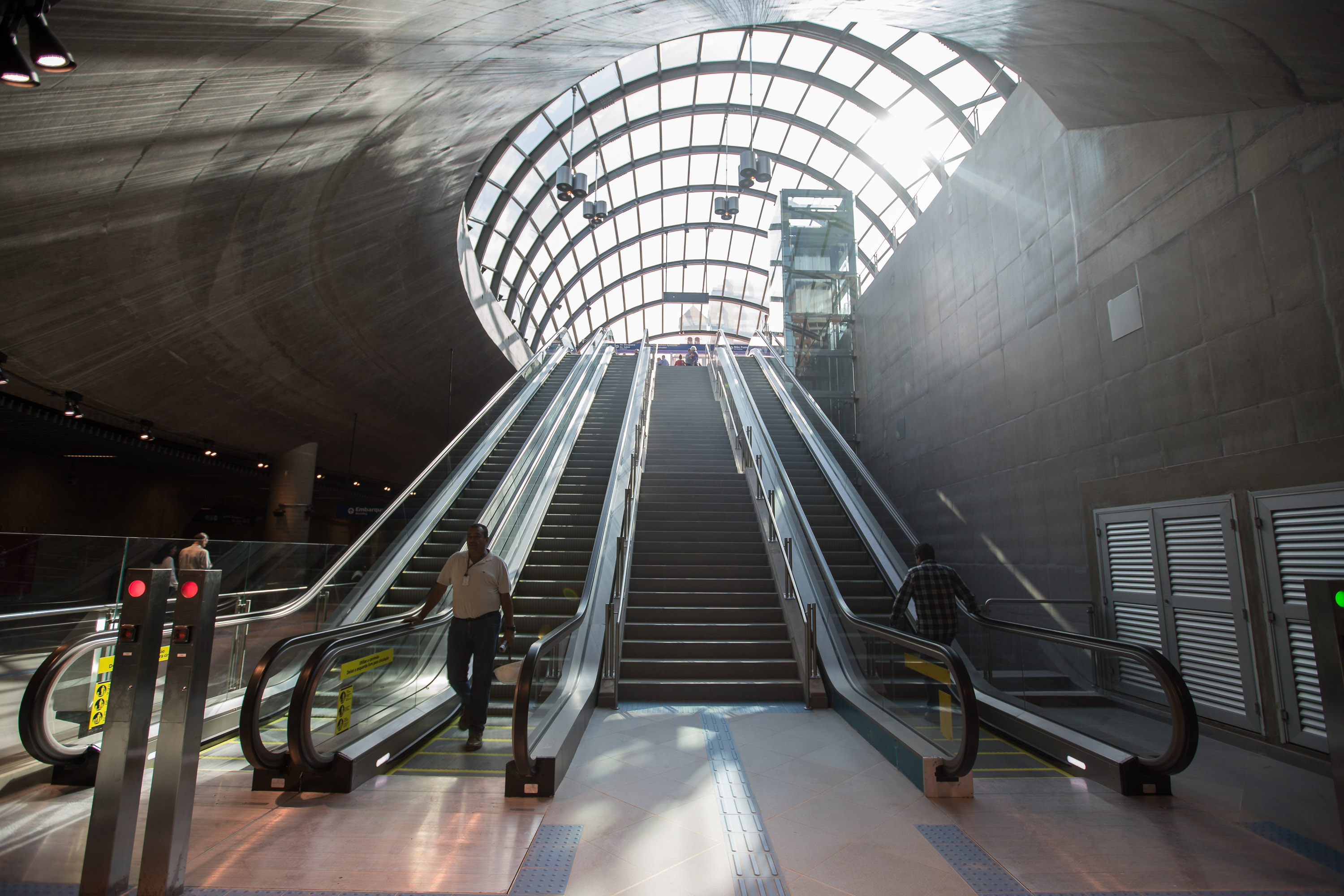
Moema Station, opened in 2018

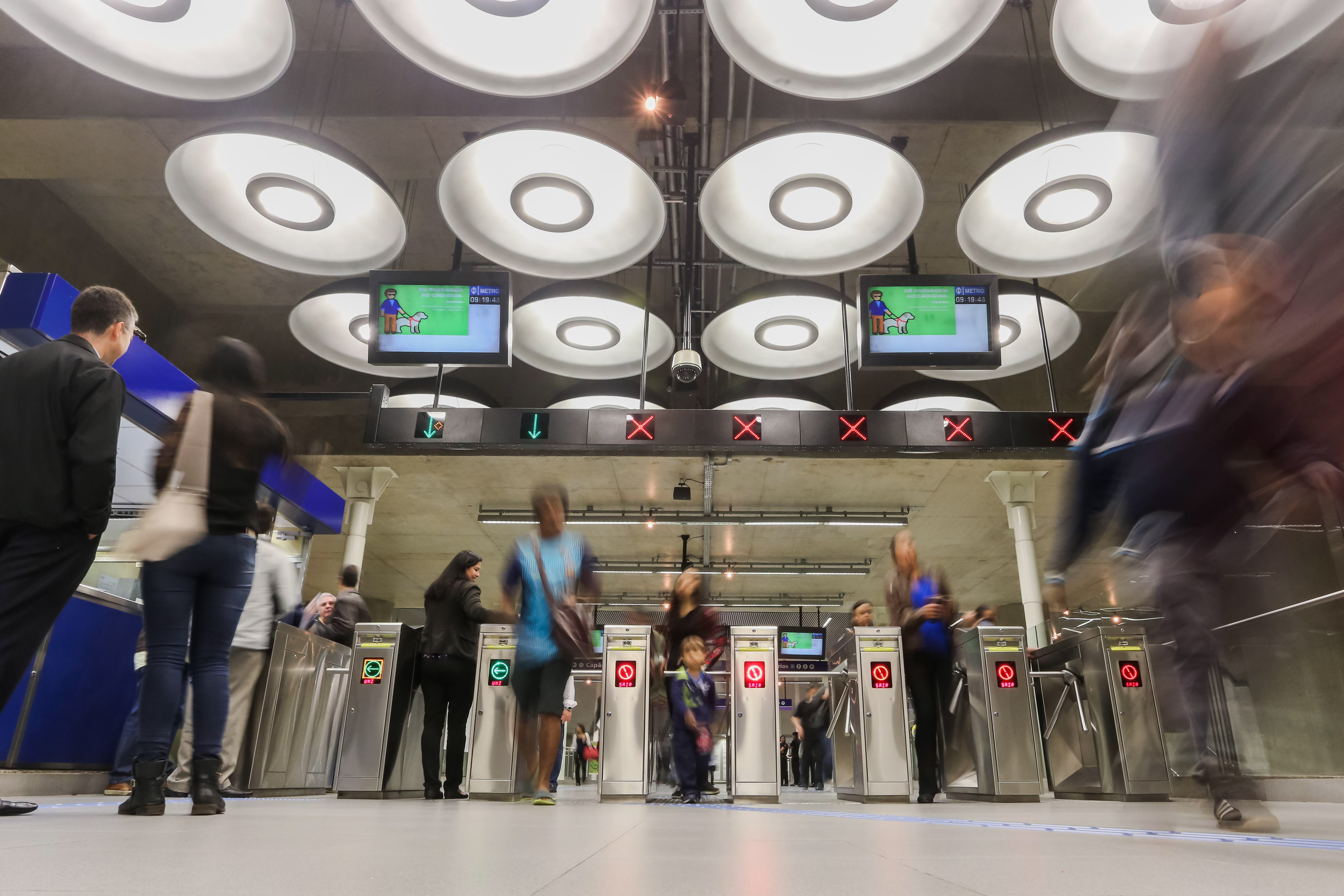
Adolfo Pinheiro Station, opened in 2014

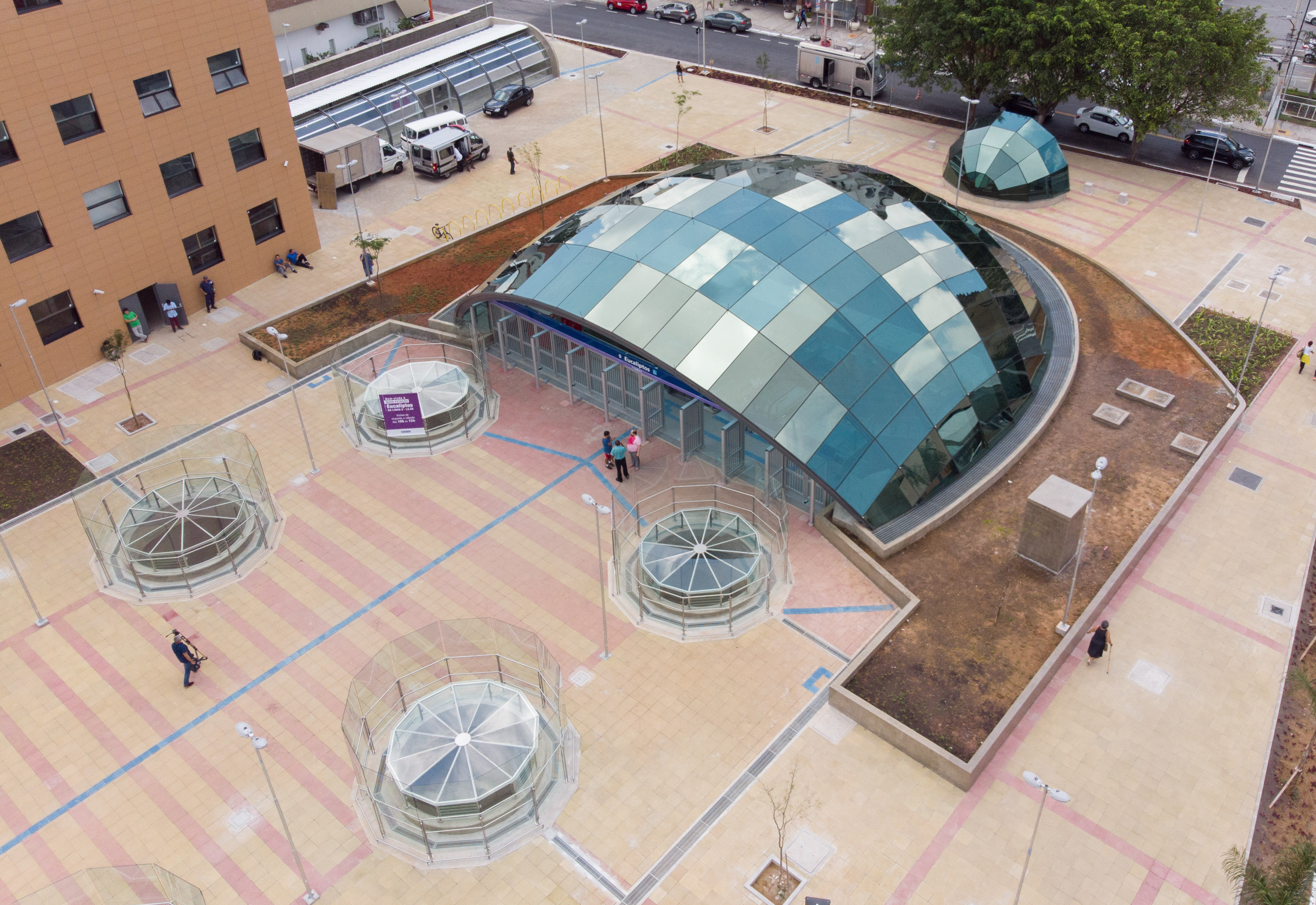
Eucaliptos Station, opened in 2018

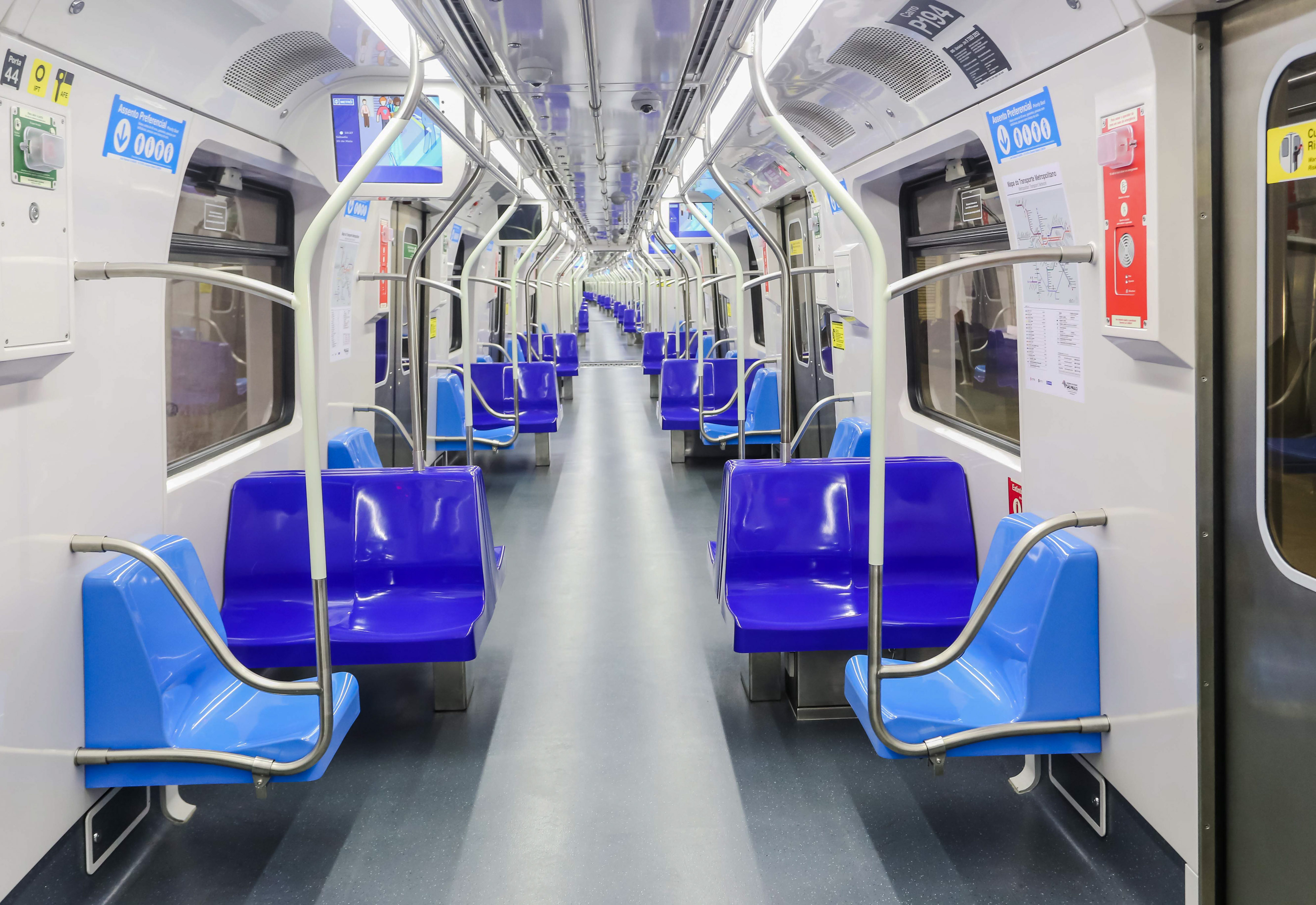
Train from P stock before redesign by Motiva Linhas 5 e 17

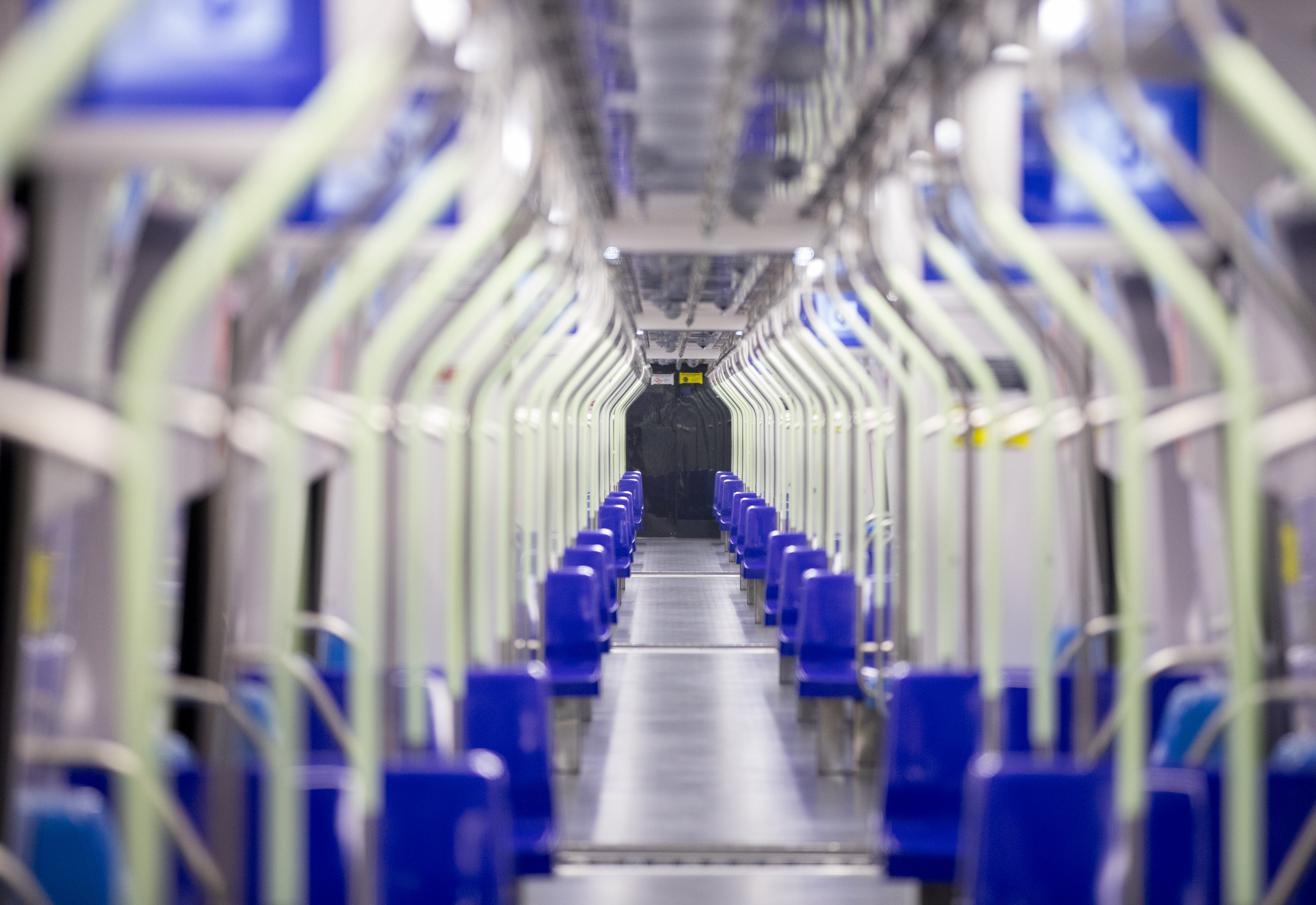
Train from P stock before redesign by Motiva Linhas 5 e 17

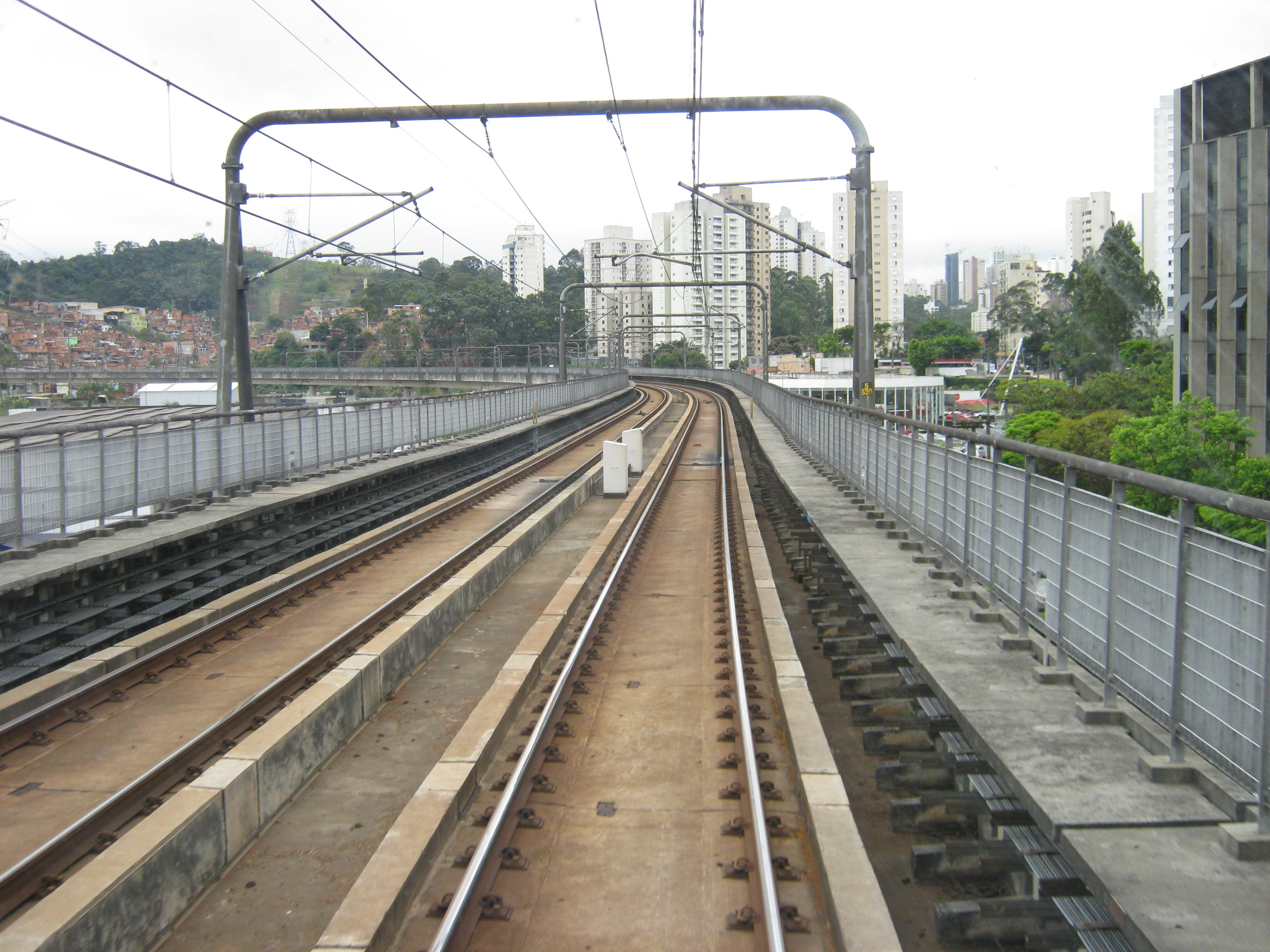
Elevated section of Line 5 - Lilac, opened in 2002

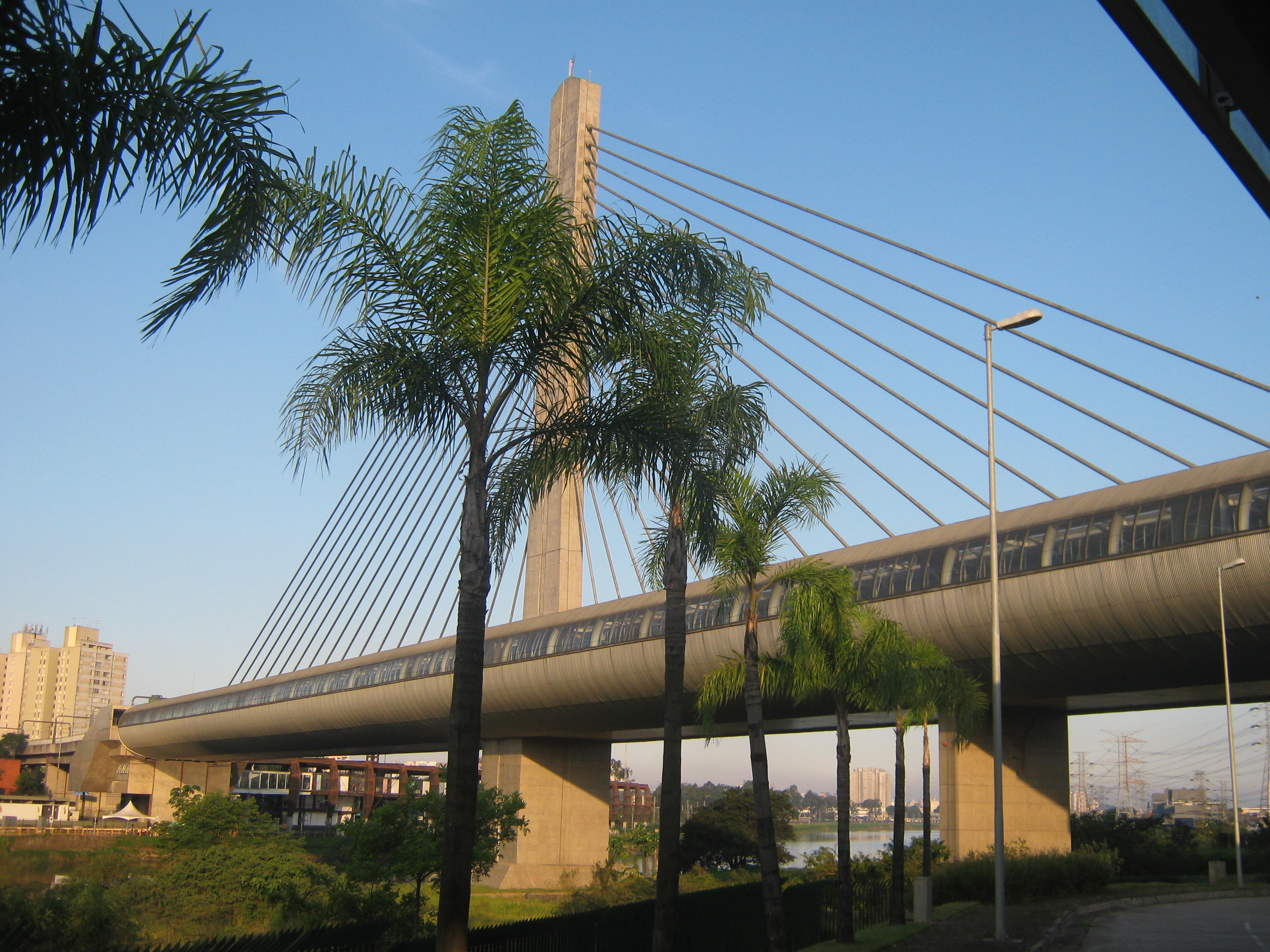
Santo Amaro Station, opened in 2002

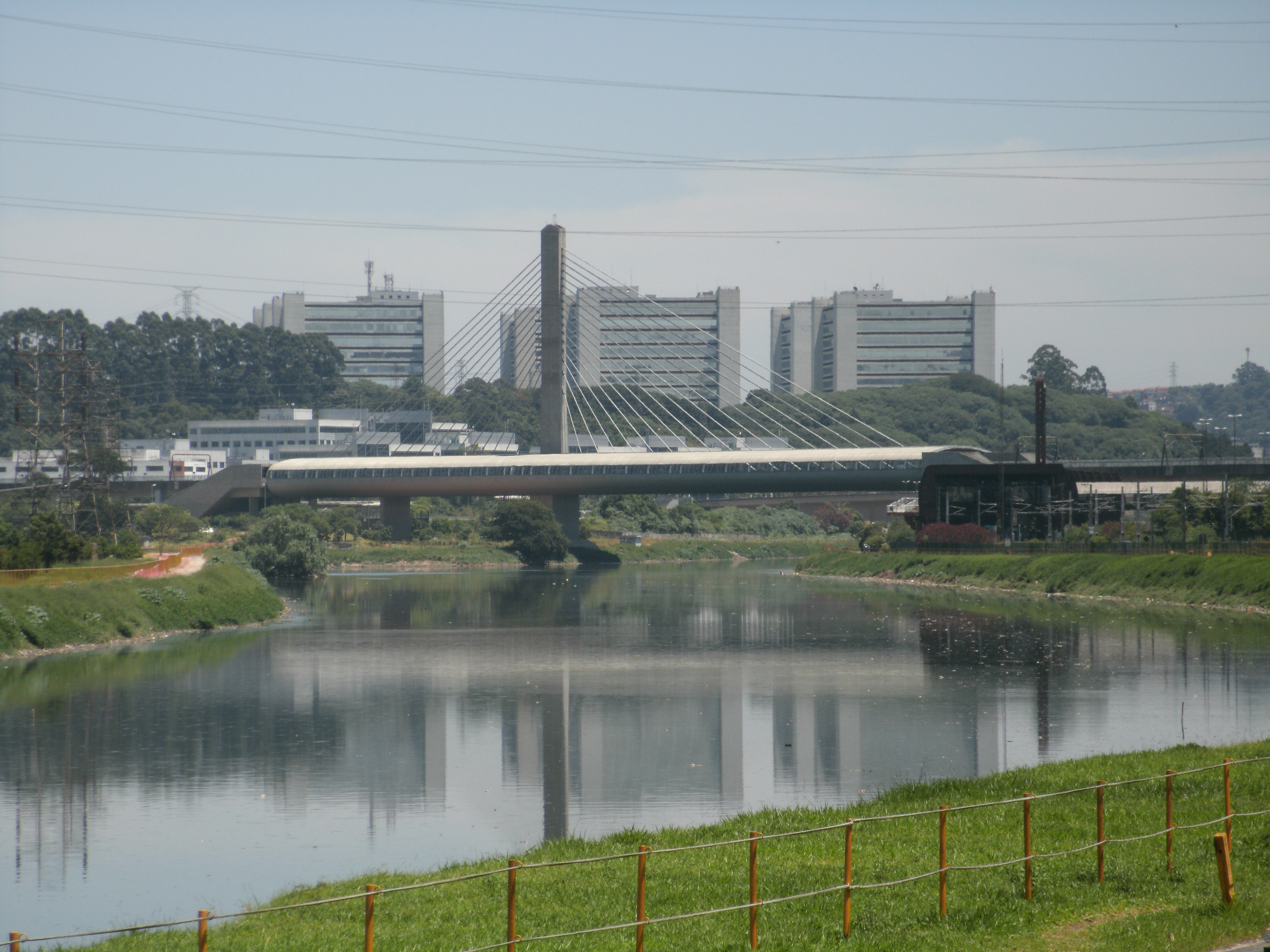
Santo Amaro Station, opened in 2002

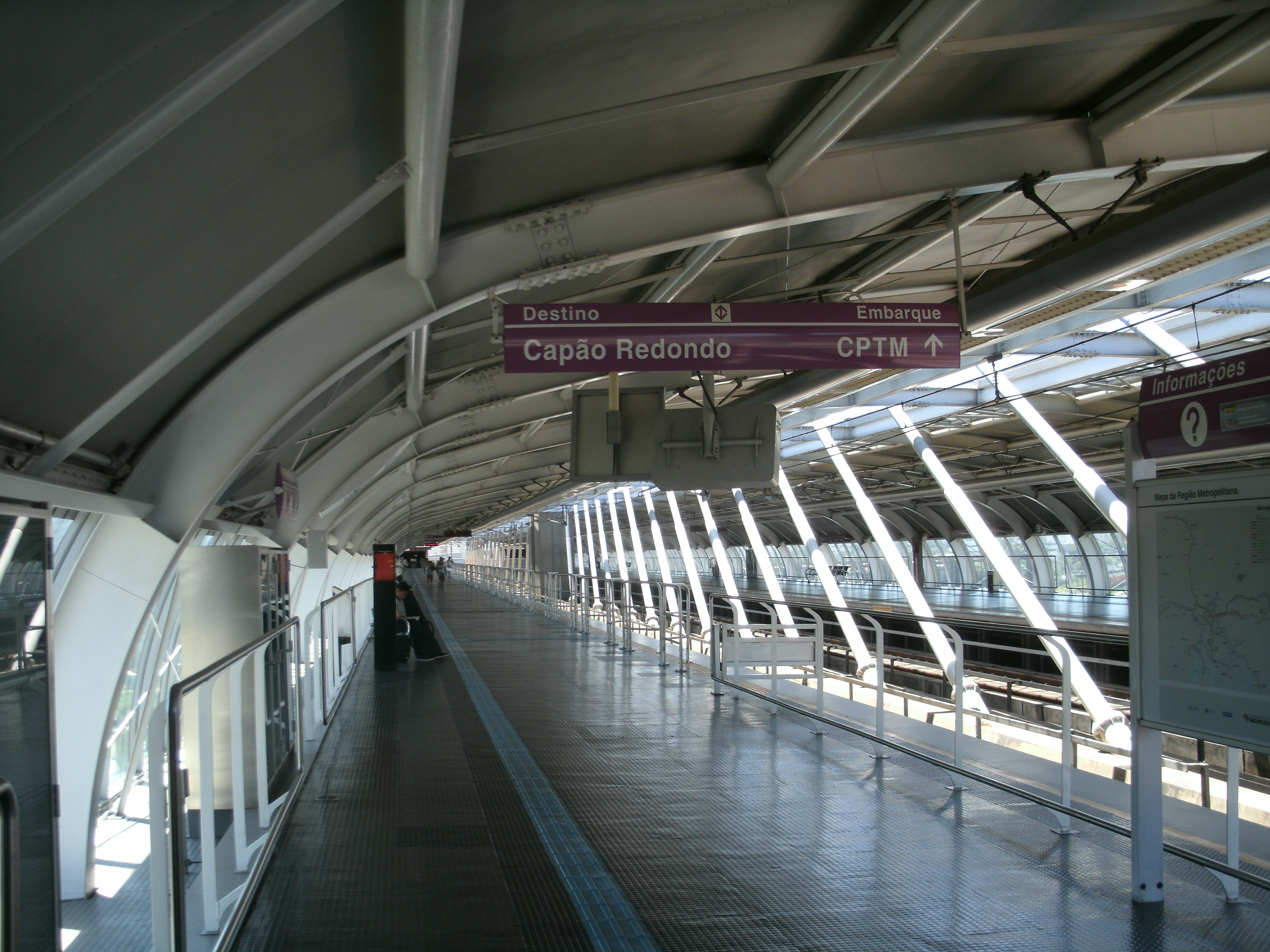
Santo Amaro Station, opened in 2002
