= P stock =

P stock may refer to:

- London Underground P Stock
- São Paulo Metro P stock
