= Santa Cruz (São Paulo Metro) =

São Paulo Metro station

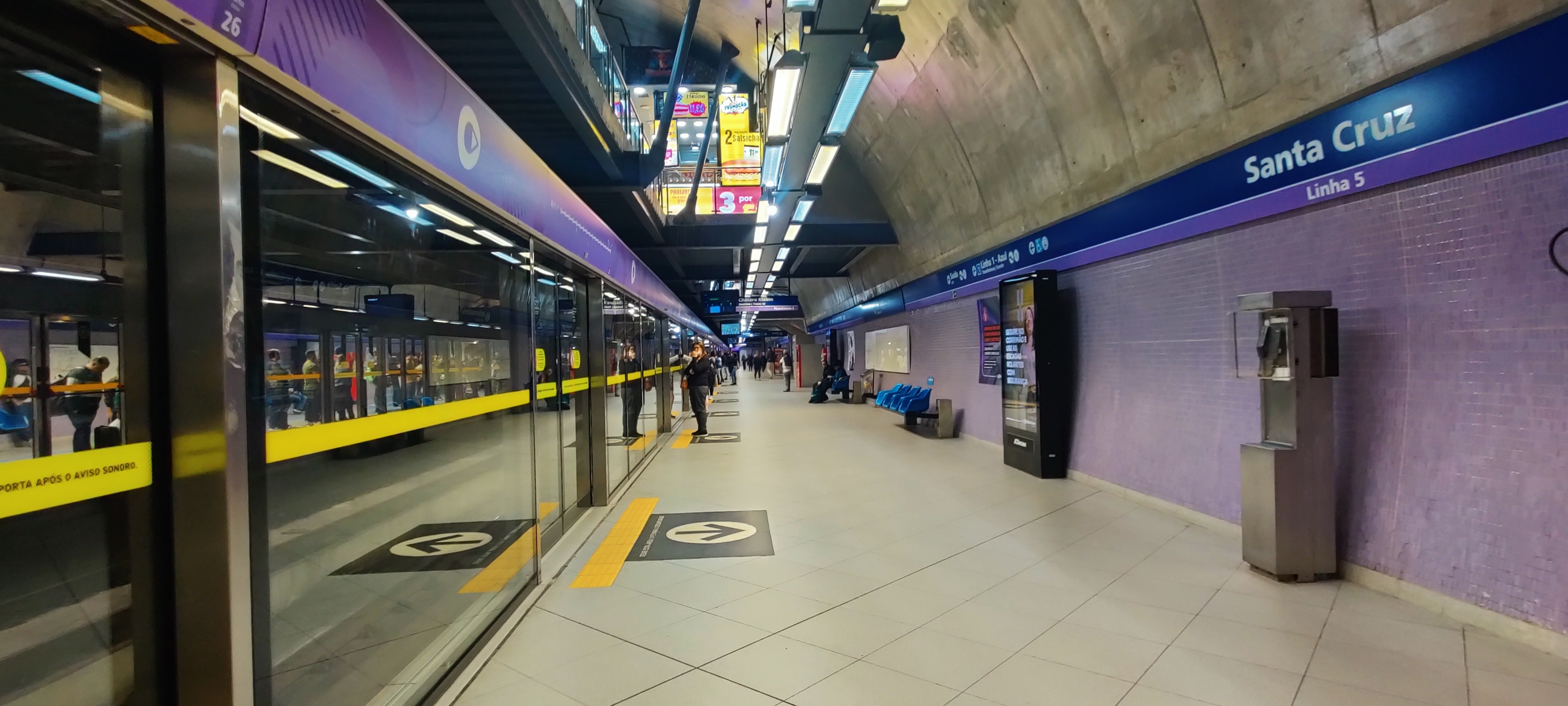
- Line 5 (Lilac) platform at Santa Cruz station

General information
- Location: R. Domingos de Morais, 2564, Vila Mariana; São Paulo; Brazil
- Coordinates: 23.599162°S 46.636681°W
- Owner: Government of the State of São Paulo
- Operator: Companhia do Metropolitano de São Paulo; Motiva Linhas 5 e 17
- Platforms: Side platforms
- Connections: José Diniz–Ibirapuera–Santa Cruz Bus Corridor

Construction
- Structure type: Underground
- Accessible: y

Other information
- Station code: SCZ

History
- Opened: September 14, 1974; September 28, 2018

Passengers
- 93,000/business day

Services
Preceding station	São Paulo Metro	Following station
Vila Mariana towards Tucuruvi	Line 1	Praça da Árvore towards Jabaquara
Hospital São Paulo towards Capão Redondo	Line 5	Chácara Klabin Terminus
Track layout
Line 1
Line 5
Location

Santa Cruz is an interchange station metro station on Line 1 (Blue) and Line 5 (Lilac) of the São Paulo Metro in the Vila Mariana district of São Paulo, Brazil.

== SPTrans lines ==
The following SPTrans bus lines can be accessed. Passengers may use a Bilhete Único card for transfer:

Line #	Destination
4716/10	Sacomã
4718/10	Jardim Celeste
502J/10	Autodromo Station
675K/10	Jardim Ângela Terminal
675L/10	Santo Amaro Terminal
857A/10	Campo Limpo Terminal
875C/10	Lapa Terminal
