= Jardim Cinira =

Jardim Cinira is a neighborhood of the city of Itapecerica da Serra in the Brazilian state of São Paulo.

The neighborhood is currently composed of 11 streets: "Soldado PM Gilberto Augustinho Avenue", "Getúlio Vargas Avenue", "Deodoro da Fonseca Street", "Campos Sales Street", "Epitácio Pessoa Street", "Washington Luís Street", "Palmares Street", "Nova Granada Street", "Floriano Peixoto Street", "Palestina Street" and "Hermes da Fonseca Street".

The neighborhood is the most populous one in Itapecerica da Serra.

== See also ==
- Parque Paraíso
