= Parque Paraíso =

Coordinates: 22°49′S 43°36′W

The Parque Paraíso is the biggest neighborhood council in the Brazilian municipality of Itapecerica da Serra, in the state of São Paulo. It has a large network of trade and the largest and most comprehensive public transport network. The neighborhood almost forms a conurbation with the city centre and has a large proportion of the population of the municipality of Itapecerica. The 2000 census lists a total population of 25,536.
