= Subprefecture of Campo Limpo =

Coordinates: 23°38′S 46°46′W

- Subprefecture
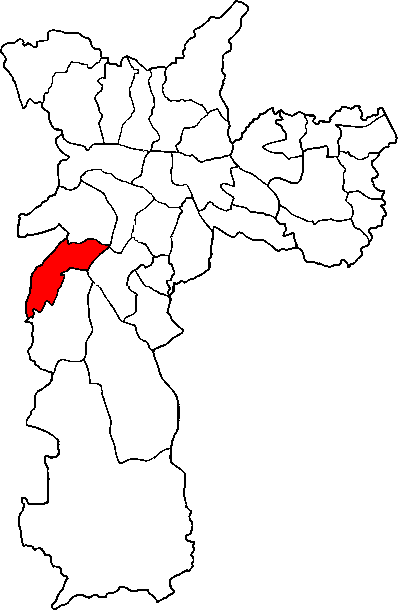
- Location of the Subprefecture of Campo Limpo in São Paulo

- Location of municipality of São Paulo within the State of São Paulo
- Country: Brazil
- Region: Southeast
- State: São Paulo
- Municipality: São Paulo
- Administrative Zone: South
- Districts: Campo Limpo, Capão Redondo, Vila Andrade

Government
  - Type: Subprefecture
  - Subprefect: Trajano Conrado Carneiro Neto

Area
  - Total: 36.67 km^{2} (14.16 sq mi)

Population (2008)
  - Total: 578,857
- Website: Subprefeitura Campo Limpo (Portuguese)

The Subprefecture of Campo Limpo is one of 32 subprefectures of the city of São Paulo, Brazil. It comprises three districts: Campo Limpo, Capão Redondo, and Vila Andrade. The slum of Paraisópolis, the second largest of the city and surrounded by middle-to-upper class apartment buildings, is located here.
