= Vila Andrade =

District of São Paulo, Brazil

Coordinates: 23.6335°S 46.7362°W

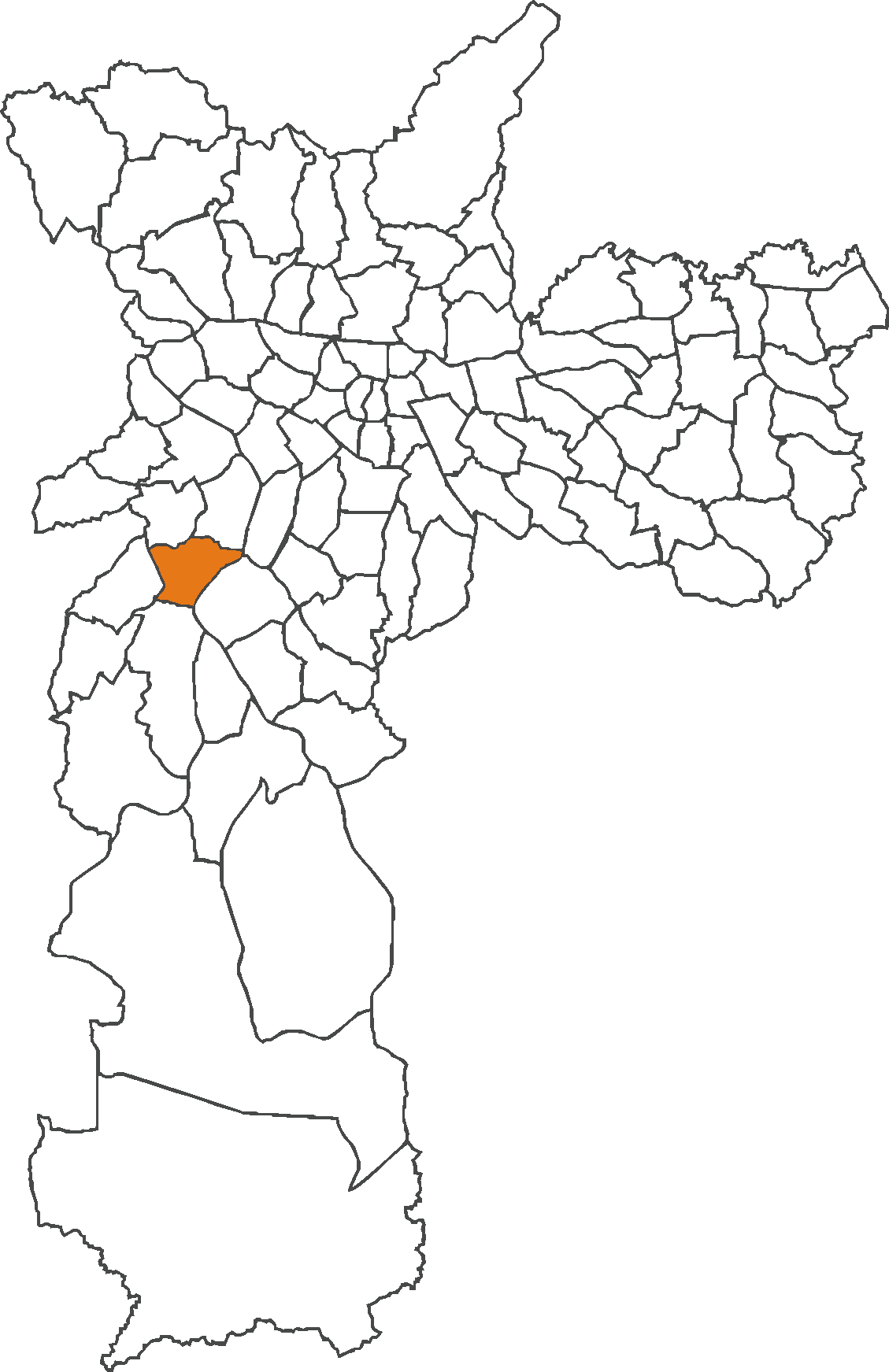
- District of the city of São Paulo
- Country: Brazil
- State: São Paulo
- Municipality: São Paulo
- Subprefecture: Campo Limpo

Area
  - Total: 10.30 km^{2} (3.98 sq mi)

Population (2007)
  - Total: 127,015
  - Density: 12,332/km^{2} (31,940/sq mi)
- Website: Subprefecture of Campo Limpo

Vila Andrade is one of 96 districts in the city of São Paulo, Brazil.
