= Campo Limpo (district of São Paulo) =

District of São Paulo, Brazil

Coordinates: 23.6336°S 46.7549°W

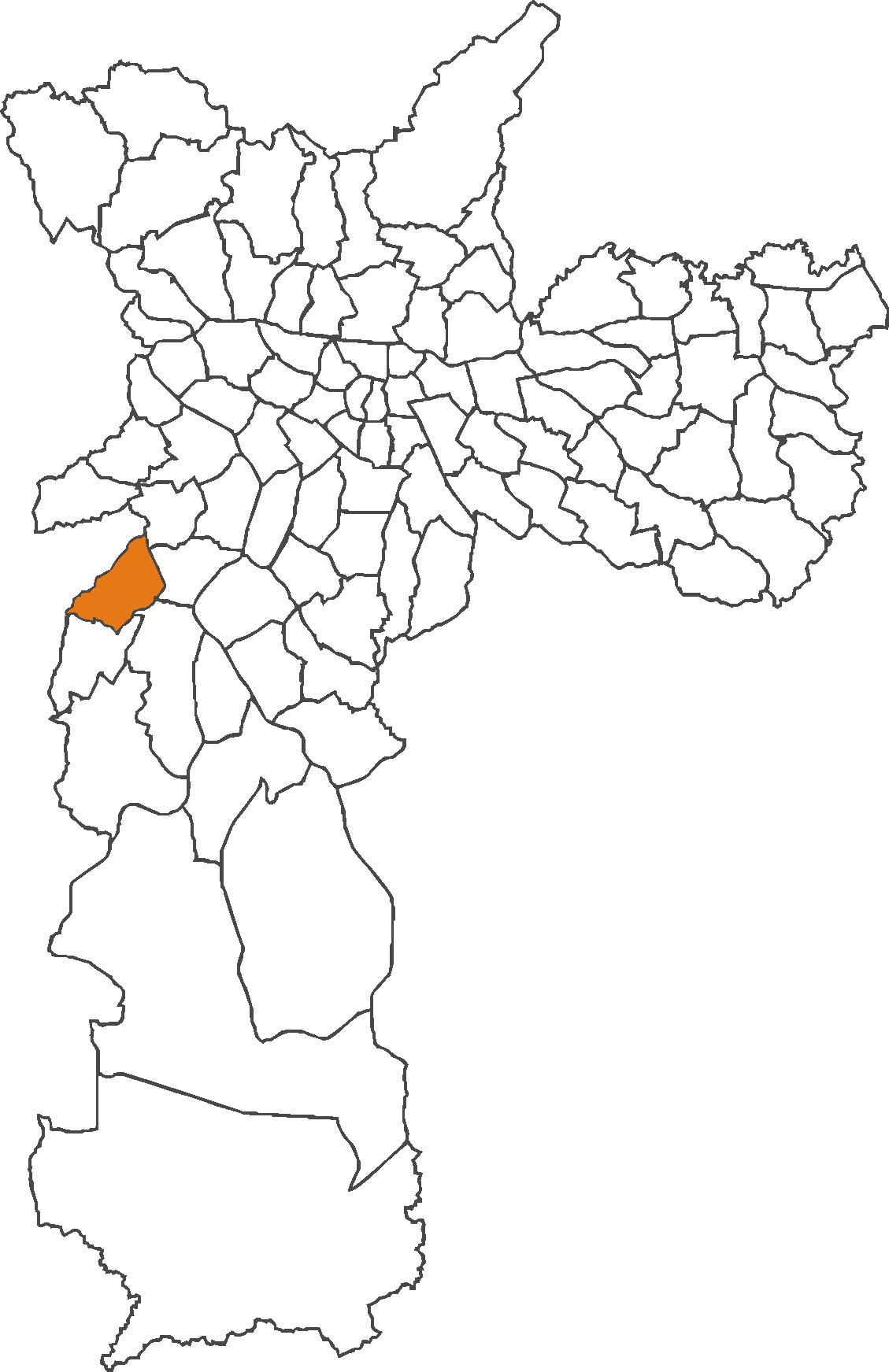
- District of the city of São Paulo

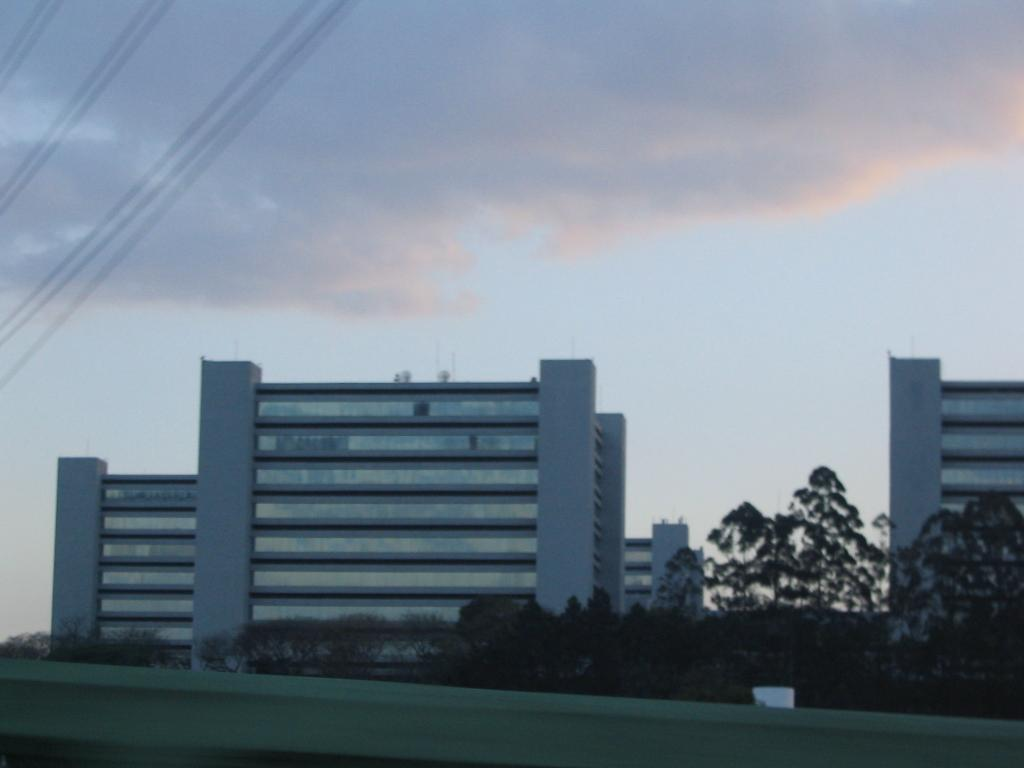
- Country: Brazil
- State: São Paulo
- Municipality: São Paulo
- Subprefecture: Campo Limpo

Area
  - Total: 12.80 km^{2} (4.94 sq mi)

Population (2007)
  - Total: 211,361
  - Density: 16,513/km^{2} (42,770/sq mi)
- Website: Subprefecture of Campo Limpo

Campo Limpo is one of 96 districts in the city of São Paulo, Brazil.
