= Capão Redondo (São Paulo Metro) =

Metro station in São Paulo, Brazil

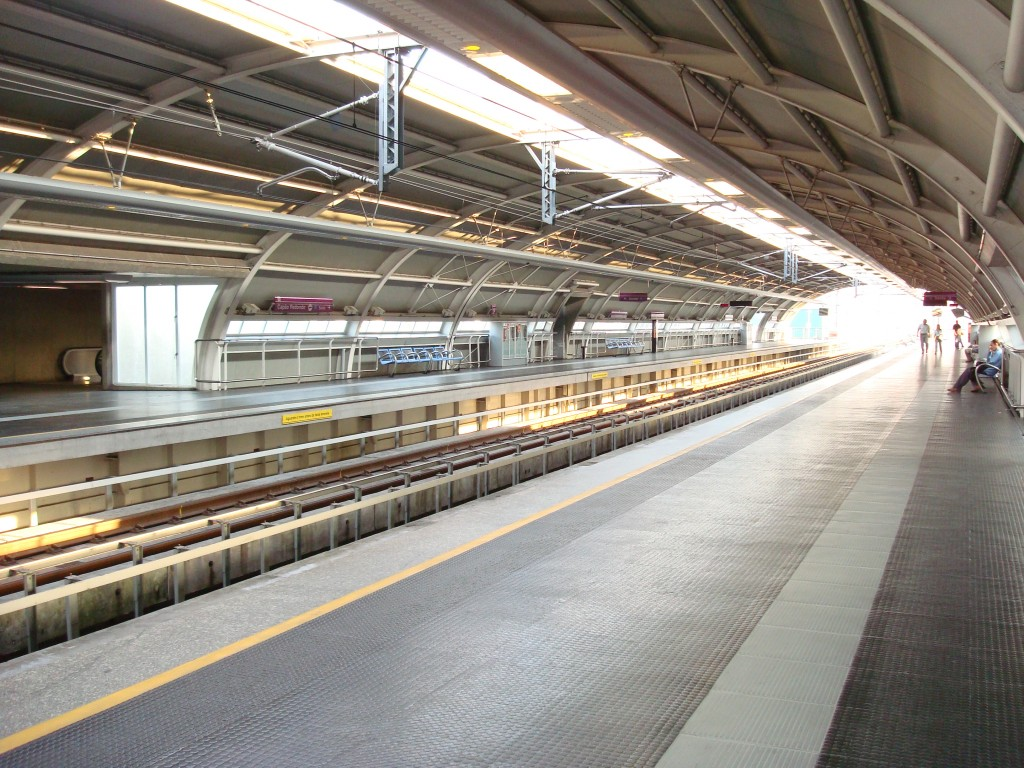
- Platforms of the station

General information
- Location: Av. Carlos Caldeira Filho, 4261, Capão Redondo; São Paulo; Brazil
- Coordinates: 23°39′33″S 46°46′05″W
- Owner: Government of the State of São Paulo
- Operator: Companhia do Metropolitano de São Paulo (2002–2018); Motiva Linhas 5 e 17 (2018–2038)
- Platforms: Side platforms
- Connections: Capão Redondo Bus Terminal

Construction
- Structure type: Elevated
- Accessible: y
- Architect: Luiz Carlos Esteves

Other information
- Station code: CPR

History
- Opened: October 20, 2002

Services
Preceding station	São Paulo Metro	Following station
Terminus	Line 5	Campo Limpo towards Chácara Klabin
Track layout
Location

Capão Redondo is a metro station on Line 5 (Lilac) of the São Paulo Metro in the Capão Redondo district of São Paulo, Brazil and is the western terminus.

== SPTrans lines ==
The following SPTrans bus lines can be accessed. Passengers may use a Bilhete Único card for transfer:

Line	Destination
7005/51	Jardim Vera Cruz
7006/51	Jardim Horizonte Azul

== EMTU lines ==
The following EMTU bus lines can be accessed:

Line	Prefix	City	Neighborhood
001	TRO	Itapecerica da Serra	Parque Paraíso
001	BI1	Itapecerica da Serra	Jardim Santo Eduardo
002	TRO	Embú	Engenho Velho
193	TRO	Embú	Jardim Santa Tereza
339	TRO	Itapecerica da Serra	Jardim Cinira
340	TRO	Itapecerica da Serra	Jardim São Marcos
451	TRO	Itapecerica da Serra	Jardim Branca Flor
484	TRO	Embú	Jardim da Luz
513	TRO	Itapecerica da Serra	Jardim das Oliveiras
527	TRO	Embú	Jardim Vista Alegre
531	TRO	Itapecerica da Serra	Recreio Primavera
551	TRO	Embú	Jardim Vista Alegre

== Capão Redondo train yard ==
The Capão Redondo train yard was built to the south of the station. 75 thousand square meters were used to build a yard with a capacity of eight trains, six block for support with maintenance activities and de operational control center for Line 5.
