= Motiva Linhas 5 e 17 =

Brazilian rail transport company

Overview
- Main regions: São Paulo, Brazil
- Fleet: 48 Alstom/CAF/Siemens F stock (8 trains); 156 CAF P stock (26 trains); 84 BYD Skyrail N stock (14 trains)
- Stations called at: 23
- Parent company: Motiva
- Key people: Andre Salcedo (CEO)
- Dates of operation: 2018–present
- Predecessor: Companhia do Metropolitano de São Paulo

Technical
- Track gauge: 1,435 mm (4 ft 8 1/2 in) (Line 5); 690 mm (2 ft 3 in) (Line 17)
- Electrification: Overhead line, 1,500 V DC (Line 5); Third rail, 750 V DC (Line 17)
- Operating speed: 80 km/h (50 mph)

Other
- Website: trilhos.motiva.com.br/viamobilidade5/

Motiva Linhas 5 e 17, formerly known as ViaMobilidade Linhas 5 e 17, is a company in Brazil belonging to Motiva Trilhos, that has been responsible for the operation, maintenance and investments in Line 5–Lilac and Line 17-Gold for 20 years, through a public-private concession contract in partnership with the State Government of São Paulo.

Besides Motiva, the consortium also has RuasInvest as an investor, a branch of one of the most traditional bus groups of São Paulo. Both companies also manage Line 4–Yellow of Motiva Linha 4 and lines 8-Diamond and 9-Emerald of ViaMobilidade Linhas 8 e 9. Besides that, the consortium will operate Line 17–Gold, currently under tests and operated by Companhia do Metropolitano de São Paulo, and connects stations Morumbi of ViaMobilidade Line Line 9–Emerald, in Marginal Pinheiros, to Congonhas Airport, in Southside São Paulo.

== Lines ==
Line	Color	Termini	Length	Stations
Line 5	Lilac	Capão Redondo ↔ Chácara Klabin	19.9 km (12.4 mi)	17
Line 17	Gold (Monorail)	Morumbi ↔ Washington Luís/Aeroporto de Congonhas	6.7 km (4.2 mi)	8

=== Future developments ===
Planned
Line	Color	Termini	Length	Stations
Line 5	Lilac (Expansion)	Capão Redondo ↔ Jardim Ângela	4.3 km (2.7 mi)	2
Line 17	Gold (Monorail)	Morumbi ↔ São Paulo-Morumbi	6.8 km (4.2 mi)	5
Line 17	Gold (Monorail)	Washington Luís ↔ Jabaquara-Comitê Paralímpico Brasileiro	4 km (2.5 mi)	5

== Motiva rolling stock ==
Line 5–Lilac has a fleet of 34 vehicles:

Line	Year	Manufacturer	Trains	Fleet Numbering / Vehicles
5	2001/2002	Alstom	08	501 to 508
5	2013/2014	CAF	26	509 to 534

== See also ==
- Line 5 (São Paulo Metro)
- Line 17 (São Paulo Metro)
- Motiva
- ViaMobilidade Linhas 8 e 9
