= Chácara Klabin (São Paulo Metro) =

São Paulo Metro station

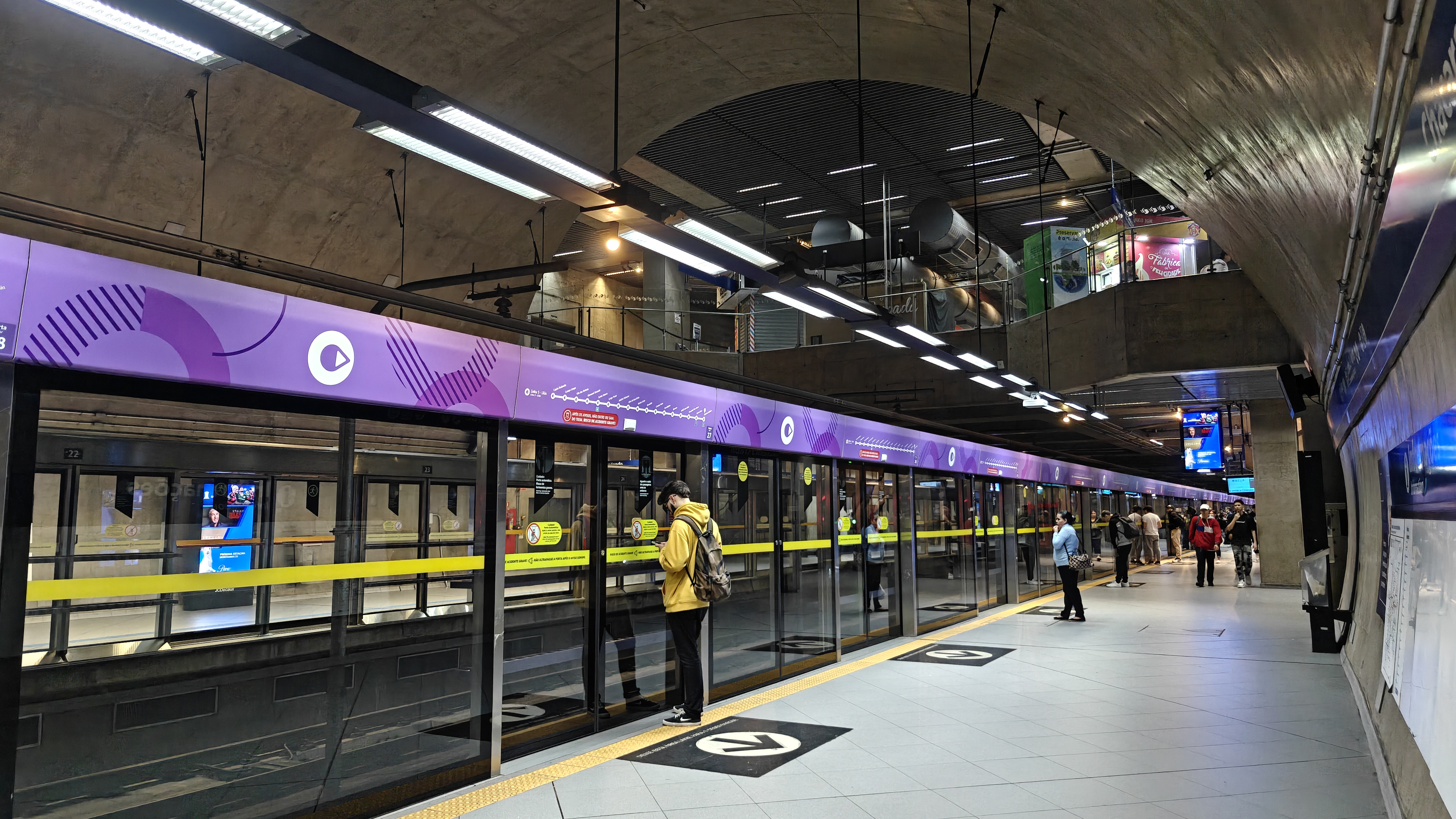
- Platform of Line 5-Lilac

General information
- Location: Rua Vergueiro, Vila Mariana; São Paulo; Brazil
- Coordinates: 23°35′33″S 46°37′48″W
- Owner: Government of the State of São Paulo
- Operator: Companhia do Metropolitano de São Paulo; Motiva Linhas 5 e 17
- Platforms: Island platforms Side platforms

Construction
- Structure type: Underground
- Accessible: Y
- Architect: Ilvio Silva Artioli

Other information
- Station code: CKB; CKL

History
- Opened: May 9, 2006; 20 years ago September 28, 2018; 7 years ago
- Former names: Embuaçu

Passengers
- 66,000/business day

Services
Preceding station	São Paulo Metro	Following station
Ana Rosa towards Vila Madalena	Line 2	Santos-Imigrantes towards Penha
Santa Cruz towards Capão Redondo	Line 5	Terminus
Track layout
Line 2
Line 5
Location

Chácara Klabin is an interchange station on Line 2 (Green) and Line 5 (Lilac) of the São Paulo Metro in the Vila Mariana district of São Paulo, Brazil.

== Station layout ==
G	Street level	Exit/entrance
M1	Mezzanine level 1	Fare control, ticket office, customer service, Bilhete Único/BOM recharge machines
P1; Platform level 1
P1; Platform level 1	Northbound	← toward Vila Madalena
P1; Platform level 1	Island platform, doors open on the left
P1; Platform level 1	Southbound	toward Vila Prudente →
M2	Mezzanine level 2	Transfer between Lines and
P2; Platform level 2
P2; Platform level 2	Side platform, doors open on the right
P2; Platform level 2	Southbound	toward Capão Redondo →
P2; Platform level 2	Southbound	toward Capão Redondo →
P2; Platform level 2	Side platform, doors open on the left
