= Vereador José Diniz (São Paulo Metro) =

Monorail station in Sao Paulo, Brazil

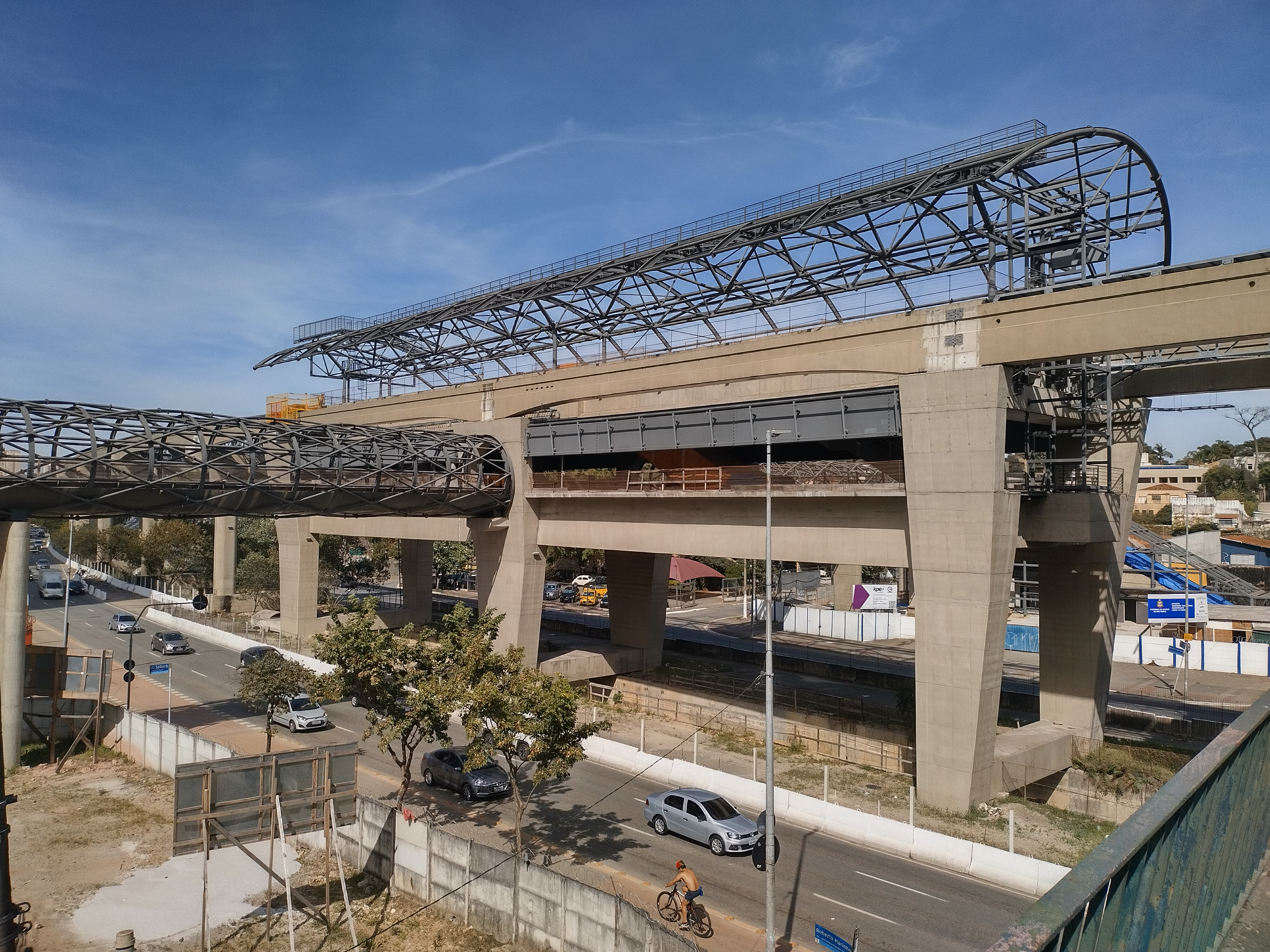
- Paused construction works in 2022

General information
- Location: Av. Jornalista Roberto Marinho × Av. Ver. José Diniz, Campo Belo; São Paulo; Brazil
- Coordinates: 23°37′20″S 46°40′43″W
- Owner: Government of the State of São Paulo
- Operator: Motiva Linhas 5 e 17
- Platforms: Island platforms

Construction
- Structure type: Elevated
- Accessible: Yes

Other information
- Station code: VJD

History
- Opened: 31 March 2026

Services
Preceding station	São Paulo Metro	Following station
Campo Belo towards Morumbi	Line 17	Brooklin Paulista towards Aeroporto de Congonhas or Washington Luís
Track layout
Location

Vereador José Diniz is a monorail station of Line 17-Gold of Motiva Linhas 5 e 17 and connects Line 9-Emerald to Congonhas Airport.

Vereador José Diniz station is located in the crossing of Avenida Jornalista Roberto Marinho with Avenida Vereador José Diniz.

Initially, in the São Paulo Metro expansion plans, Line 17-Gold should be open until 2014, connecting with São Paulo–Morumbi station of Line 4-Yellow, at the time that Morumbi Stadium was considered one of the hosts for 2014 FIFA World Cup.

After that, the promise of opening of the line was delayed to 2016, end of 2017, 2018, December 2020, mid of 2021, and, currently, to 2nd semester of 2022.

== Toponymy ==
The station was named after the avenue that cross the station, Vereador José Diniz. José de Oliveira Almeida Diniz was born in Campinas in 7 April 1909 and was, for many times, city councillor in the Municipal Chamber of São Paulo, always representing the borough of Santo Amaro for the Brazilian Labour Party (PTB) and the Brazilian Democratic Movement (MDB). Elect for one more term, died by a heart attack on 5 January 1973. Later, Avenida Conselheiro Rodrigues Alves was renamed after him by the Municipal Decree n.° 11,689 of 13 January 1975.

== Station layout ==
P Platform level
P Platform level	Westbound	← toward Morumbi
P Platform level	Island platform, doors open on the left
P Platform level	Eastbound	toward Aeroporto de Congonhas/Washington Luís →
M	Concourse	Fare control, ticket office, customer service, Bilhete Único/TOP recharge machines
G	Street level	Exit/entrance
