= Brooklin Paulista (São Paulo Metro) =

Monorail station in São Paulo, Brazil

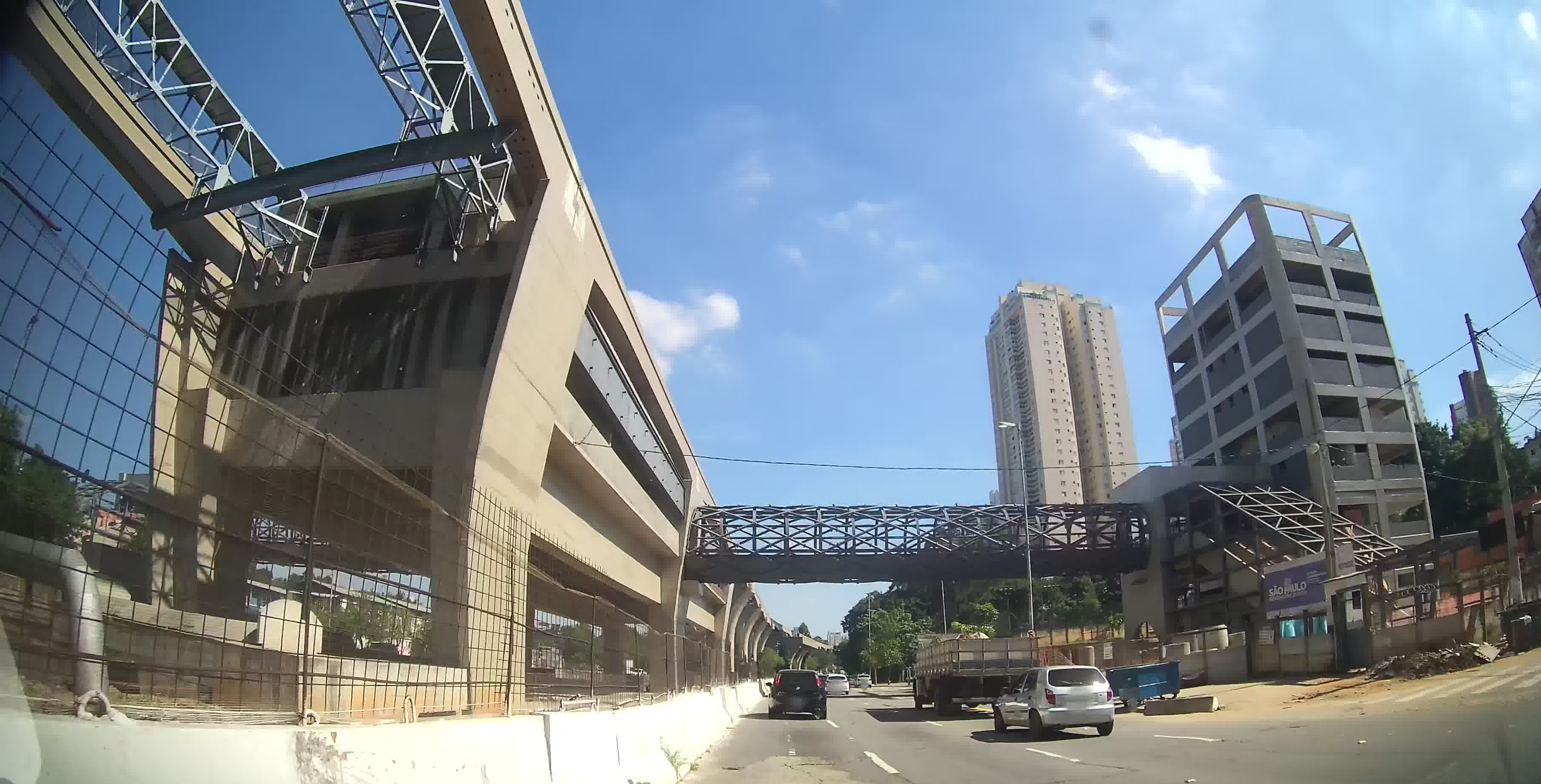
- Paused construction works in 2021

General information
- Location: Av. Jornalista Roberto Marinho × R. Vicente Leporace, Campo Belo; São Paulo; Brazil
- Coordinates: 23°37′46″S 46°40′25″W
- Owner: Government of the State of São Paulo
- Operator: Motiva Linhas 5 e 17
- Platforms: Island platforms

Construction
- Structure type: Elevated
- Accessible: Yes

Other information
- Station code: BPA

History
- Opened: 31 March 2026

Services
Preceding station	São Paulo Metro	Following station
Vereador José Diniz towards Morumbi	Line 17	Aeroporto de Congonhas Terminus
Vereador José Diniz towards Morumbi	Line 17	Washington Luís Terminus
Track layout
Location

Brooklin Paulista is a monorail station of Line 17-Gold of Motiva Linhas 5 e 17 and connects Line 9-Emerald to Congonhas Airport.

Brooklin Paulista station is located in the crossing of Avenida Jornalista Roberto Marinho with Rua Vicente Leporace.

Initially, in the São Paulo Metro expansion plans, Line 17-Gold should have been opened in 2014, connecting with São Paulo–Morumbi station of Line 4-Yellow, at the time that Morumbi Stadium was considered one of the hosts for 2014 FIFA World Cup.

After that, the promise of opening of the line was delayed to 2016, end of 2017, 2018, December 2020, mid of 2021, and, currently, to 2nd semester of 2022.

== Station layout ==
P Platform level
P Platform level	Westbound	← toward Morumbi
P Platform level	Island platform, doors open on the left
P Platform level	Eastbound	toward Aeroporto de Congonhas/Washington Luís →
M	Concourse	Fare control, ticket office, customer service, Bilhete Único/TOP recharge machines
G	Street level	Exit/entrance
