= Campo Belo (São Paulo Metro) =

São Paulo Metro station

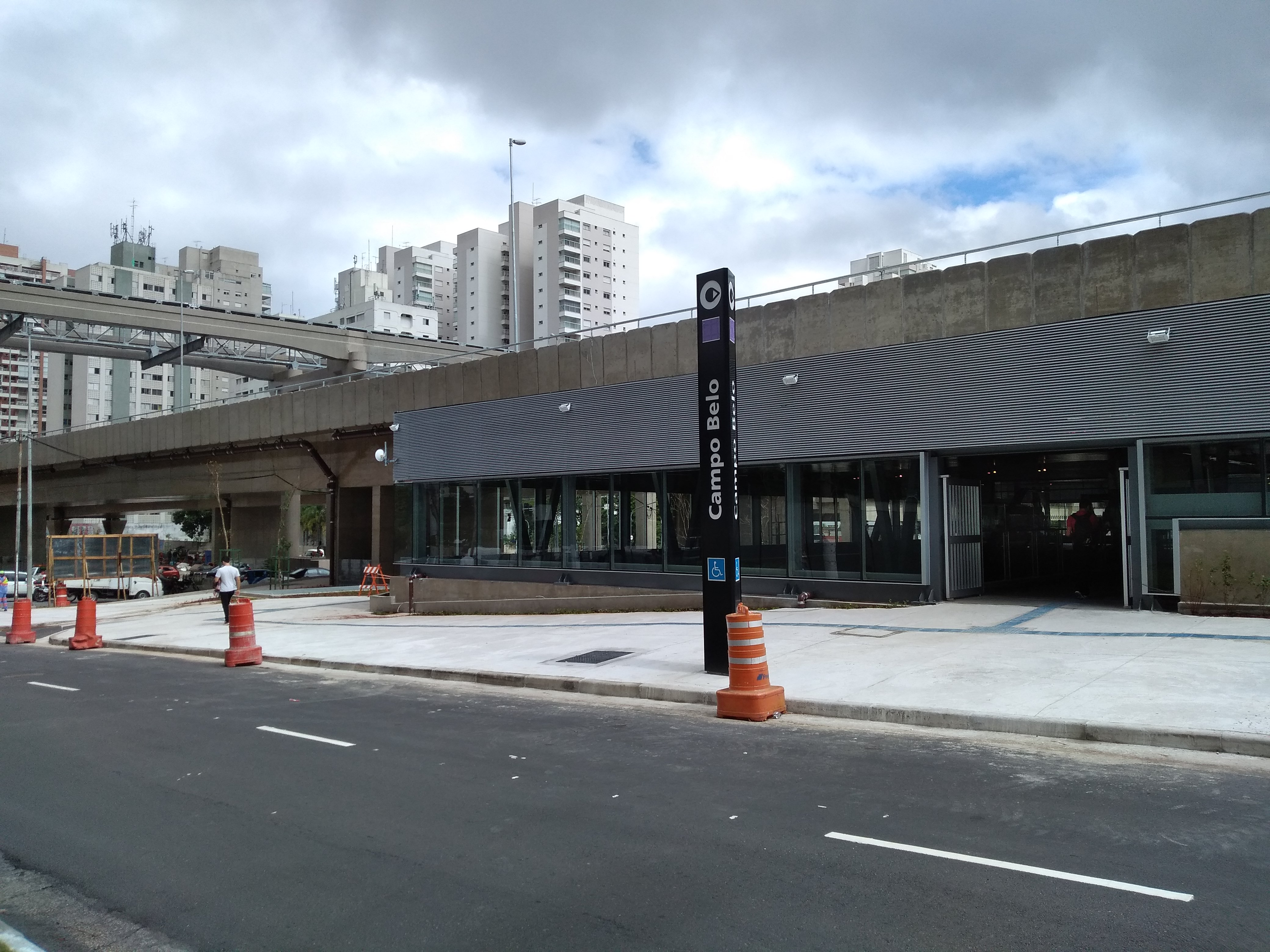
- Line 5-Lilac station entrance

General information
- Location: Av. Jornalista Roberto Marinho × Av. Santo Amaro, Santo Amaro; São Paulo; Brazil
- Coordinates: 23°37′08″S 46°40′56″W
- Owner: Government of the State of São Paulo
- Operator: Motiva Linhas 5 e 17
- Platforms: Island platforms

Construction
- Structure type: Underground; Elevated
- Accessible: Yes

Other information
- Station code: CPB

History
- Opened: 8 April 2019; 31 March 2026
- Former names: Água Espraiada

Services
Preceding station	São Paulo Metro	Following station
Brooklin towards Capão Redondo	Line 5	Eucaliptos towards Chácara Klabin
Vila Cordeiro towards Morumbi	Line 17	Vereador José Diniz towards Aeroporto de Congonhas or Washington Luís
Track layout
Line 5
Line 17
Location

Campo Belo is a station of São Paulo Metro. It opened on 8 April 2019.

It is operated by Motiva Linhas 5 e 17 and belongs to Line 5-Lilac, which connected with the metropolitan network of São Paulo in September 2018 with the opening of stations Chácara Klabin, which connects to Line 2-Green, and Santa Cruz, which connects to Line 1-Blue. It was the last station to be delivered in the expansion plan of the line. The station also has a connection with monorail Line 17-Gold.

According to the Metro original plans, the station should be named "Água Espraiada-Campo Belo", but, because of the change of name of Brooklin station of Line 5-Lilac, the station lost the sufix "Campo Belo". Later, it switched to Campo Belo, as both Brooklin and Campo Belo are located in the same borough.

On 26 March 2019, it was informed that the station opening could happen on 10 April.

On 5 April, it was confirmed the opening of the station to 8 April, two days before what was announced before. During the first 5 days, it worked in a reduced time, from 10 a.m. to 3 p.m., and on 13 April it began working in full time.

== Characteristics ==
The Line 5 station is in the underground, composed of 5 drying pits of great diameter, with structure in apparent concrete and main access roof with a steel and glass dome, for natural lighting. It has one access, with escalators in both ways and 3 preferential elevators for disabled and reduced mobility people. It has mezzanine with ticket offices and commuters distribution, besides the central platform.

== Station layout ==
P Platform level
P Platform level	Westbound	← toward Morumbi
P Platform level	Island platform, doors open on the left
P Platform level	Eastbound	toward Aeroporto de Congonhas/Washington Luís →
M	Concourse	Fare control, ticket office, customer service, Bilhete Único/TOP recharge machines, transfer between and
G	Street level	Exit/entrance
M	Concourse	Fare control, ticket office, customer service, Bilhete Único/TOP recharge machines, transfer between and
P Platform level
P Platform level	Northbound	← toward Chácara Klabin
P Platform level	Island platform, doors open on the left
P Platform level	Southbound	toward Capão Redondo →
