= Line 17 (São Paulo Metro) =

Monorail line in São Paulo

São Paulo Metro Line 17 (Gold)

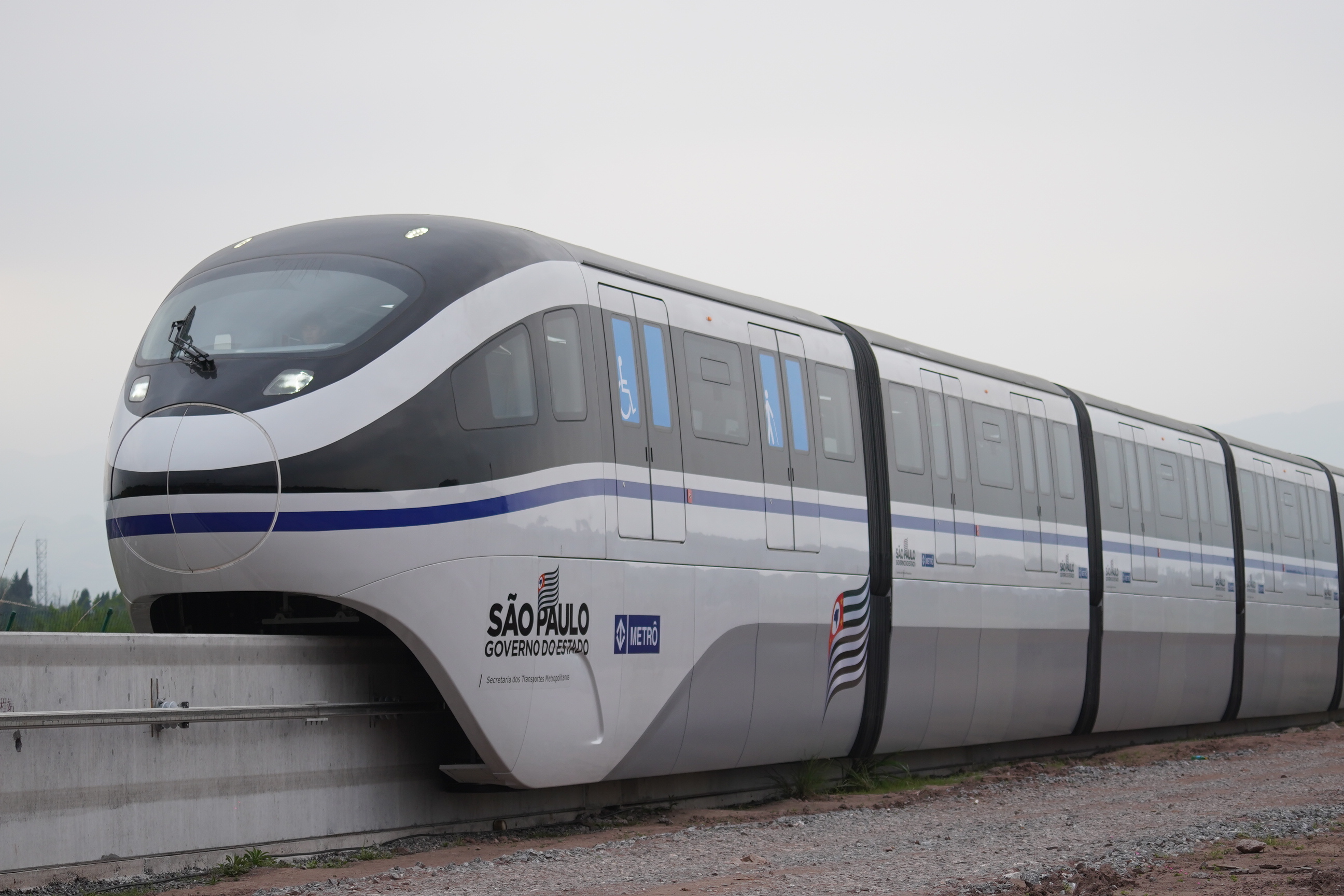
- A BYD SkyRail (N stock) demonstrator trainset

Overview
- Status: Partially operational; Partially suspended
- Owner: Government of the State of São Paulo
- Locale: São Paulo, Brazil
- Termini: Morumbi; Washington Luís/Aeroporto de Congonhas
- Connecting lines: Motiva Linhas 5 e 17 Line 5 (São Paulo Metro)
- Stations: 8 operational; 10 suspended

Service
- Type: Straddle beam monorail
- System: São Paulo Metro
- Services: Morumbi–Aeroporto de Congonhas; Brooklin Paulista–Washington Luís
- Operator: Motiva Linhas 5 e 17
- Depot: Água Espraiada rail yard
- Rolling stock: 14 × 5-car BYD SkyRail (N stock)
- Daily ridership: 43,000 (estimated)

History
- Commenced: 2012
- Opened: 31 March 2026

Technical
- Line length: 7.2 km (4.5 mi)
- Number of tracks: 2
- Character: Elevated
- Track gauge: 800 mm (2 ft 7 in)
- Electrification: 750 V DC contact rails on the side of the beam plus battery packs
- Operating speed: 80 km/h (50 mph)
- Signalling: CBTC

Line 17 (Gold) (Portuguese: Linha 17–Ouro) is a monorail for the São Paulo Metro. The line has 14 stations, beginning at the São Paulo-Morumbi station and ending at the Jabaquara station, with a branch to Congonhas station, connected to the São Paulo/Congonhas Airport. It has integration with Line 5-Lilac as well as ViaMobilidade Line 9-Emerald and will be connected to Line 1-Blue and Line 4-Yellow. The line was originally one of the transportation projects supporting the 2014 FIFA World Cup. However, delays and contract disputes have pushed the completion date from the original 2013 full opening date to 2026. The line is the first in the system to have a branch.

== History ==
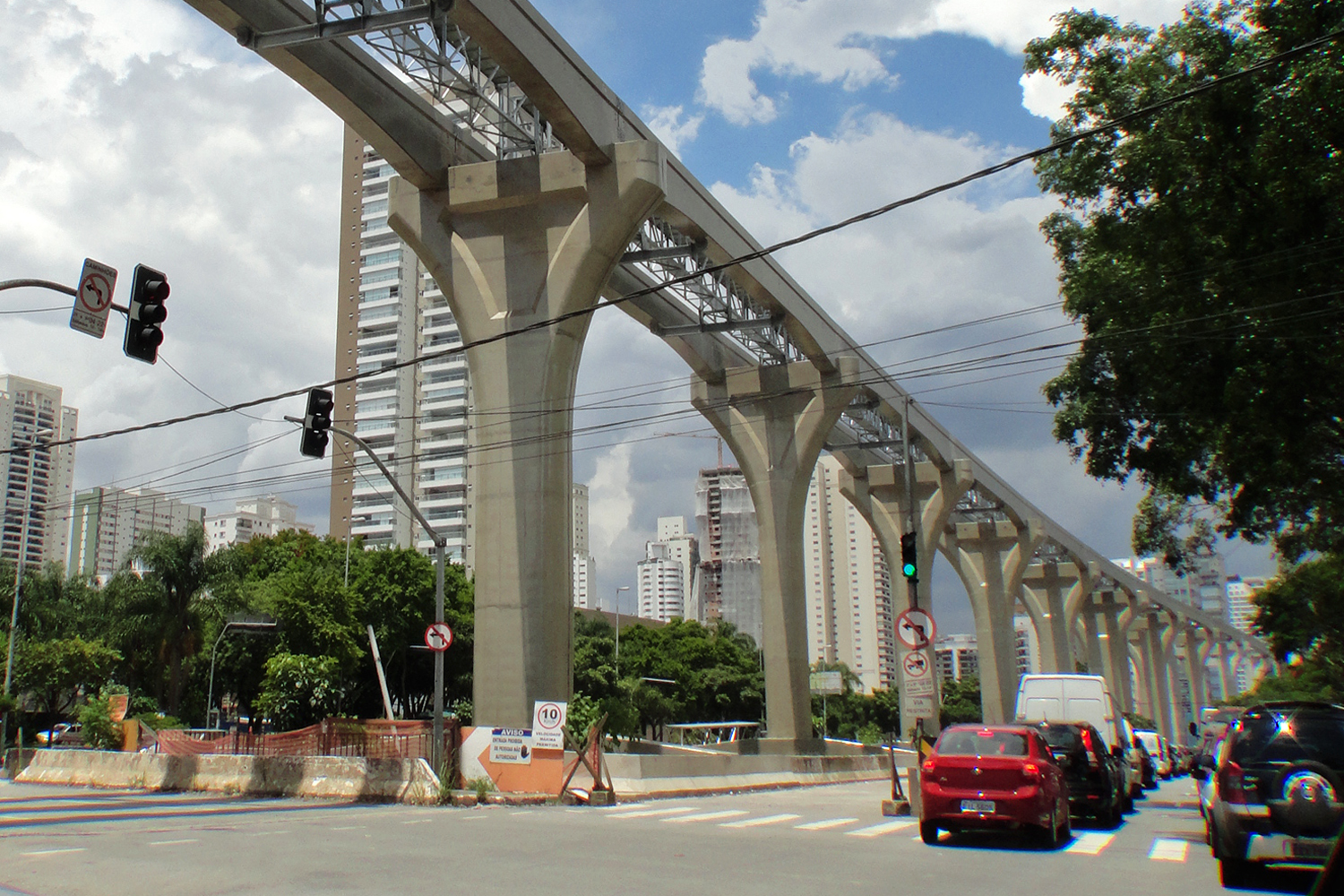
Construction works of the monorail "Linha 17-Ouro" parallel to Jornalista Roberto Marinho Avenue as of February 2015

The line was originally envisioned to be 21.5 kilometres (13.4 mi) long and should be opened in three stages. The first section was planned to be a 3.8 kilometres (2.4 mi) long linking Congonhas-São Paulo Airport to São Judas Station, with an initial demand 18,000 passengers per day and construction start in 2011. The second phase, expected to have a demand of 100,000 passengers per day, was originally planned to begin operations in 2015. It should be 10.8 kilometres (6.7 mi) long and connect the Morumbi CPTM station and the Jabaquara metro station. The two sections connect at the future Brooklin Paulista station, forming a "Y". However delays and heritage preservation issues prevented the line from starting construction, leading it to be shelved in 2011. The line was revived soon after with a proposed first phase expanded to connecting Morumbi station and the Congonhas-São Paulo Airport with a daily demand forecast of 43,000 passengers and projected opening in the first half of 2014. The second phase will extend the line west to São Paulo–Morumbi Station increasing the projected ridership for the line to 166,000, while the third phase will continue from Washington Luís station east towards Jabaquara metro station, bringing the daily ridership to an estimated 252,000.

On 2 June 2011, São Paulo Metro awarded the Monotrilho Integracao, a consortium consisting of a Malaysian rail company Scomi Rail, Brazil's second largest construction company Andrade Gutierrez, CR Almeida and Montagens e Projetos Especiais a R$1.4bn turnkey contract to build Line 17. The consortium was responsible for design, supply, installation and commissioning of the Sutra straddle monorail, including 24 Scomi SUTRA three-car trains to be provided by Scomi. The line was planned to be operated with CBTC using Thales SelTrac technology.

On 9 June 2014, a concrete support beam collapsed during construction which killed one worker and injuring two others. Completion was scheduled for the start of the World Cup but construction was delayed due to issues with environmental approvals. As a result, the line was delayed until the second half of 2015. Construction stopped October 2015 due to a contract dispute with construction only to be resumed in June 2016. This delay postponed the opening date of the first phase to 2018. Further delays in the construction has meant that the first phase of the line was further postponed from 2018 to 2019.

With the financial trouble of Scomi leading to non-performance in manufacturing the monorail rolling stock, the contract was terminated in 2019. After a short rebidding process it was announced that BYD will manufacture the rolling stock using their "SkyRail" platform. On 14 January 2020, a new contract was created, and completion was postponed to 2021 or 2022.

In November 2020, after months of legal battles, the Metropolitan Company signed a contract with Coesa Engenharia, owned by Brazilian company OAS, for the conclusion of general construction works. The annual report of the São Paulo Metropolitan Company estimates the opening of the line on 30 April 2023. Before leaving the state government, Governor João Doria estimated the opening to January 2024. After another paralyzation in construction works and another resume, the State Metropolitan Transport Secretariat estimated the opening to June 2026.

== Stations ==
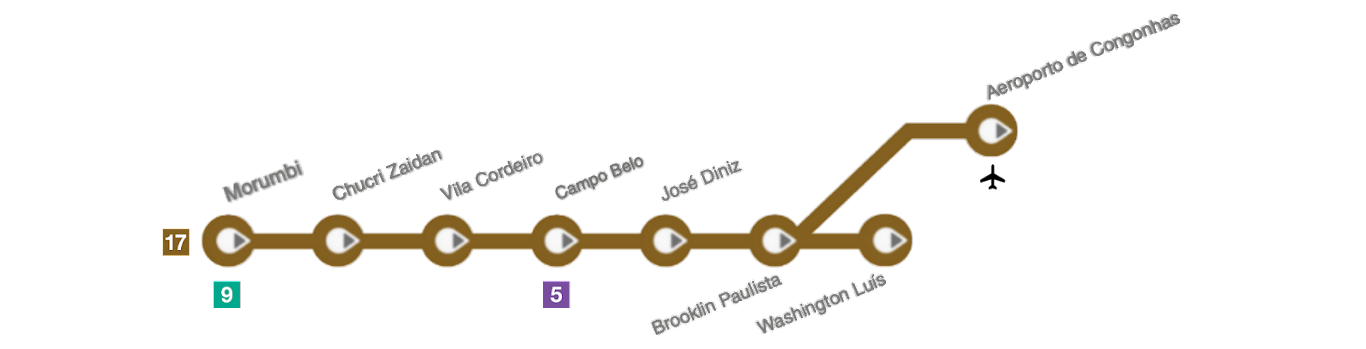
Line 17 diagram showing stations currently operational, i.e. those not in italic in the table below

Code	Station	Platforms	Position	Connections	District
MBM	São Paulo–Morumbi	Island platforms	Elevated	Morumbi Bus Terminal; Campo Limpo–Rebouças–Centro Bus Corridor	Morumbi
EMB	Estádio Morumbi	Island platforms	Elevated	-	Morumbi
AMR	Américo Maurano	Island platforms	Elevated	-	Morumbi
PSP	Paraisópolis	Island platforms	Elevated	-	Vila Andrade
PNB	Panamby	Island platforms	Elevated	-	Vila Andrade
MOB	Morumbi	Side platforms	Elevated	Diadema–Morumbi Metropolitan Corridor	Santo Amaro
CZD	Chucri Zaidan	Island platforms	Elevated	Água Espraiada Bus Transfer Station; Berrini Bus Corridor	Itaim Bibi
VCD	Vila Cordeiro	Island platforms	Elevated	-	Itaim Bibi
CPB	Campo Belo	Island platforms	Elevated	Line 5 (São Paulo Metro)	Campo Belo
VJD	Vereador José Diniz	Island platforms	Elevated	-	Campo Belo
BPA	Brooklin Paulista	Island platforms	Elevated	-	Campo Belo
CGN	Aeroporto de Congonhas	Island platforms	Elevated	São Paulo–Congonhas Airport	Campo Belo
JAP	Washington Luís	Island platforms	Elevated	-	Campo Belo
VPI	Vila Paulista	Island platforms	Elevated	-	Jabaquara
BAB	Vila Babilônia	Island platforms	Elevated	-	Jabaquara
CLE	Cidade Leonor	Island platforms	Elevated	-	Jabaquara
HSB	Hospital Sabóia	Island platforms	Elevated	-	Jabaquara
JBM	Jabaquara–Comitê Paralímpico Brasileiro	Island platforms	Elevated	Jabaquara Metropolitan Terminal; São Mateus–Jabaquara Metropolitan Corridor; São Paulo Zoo shuttle bus service Jabaquara Road Terminal	Jabaquara

== See also ==
- List of monorail systems
- Line 15 (São Paulo Metro)
