= Campo Belo (disambiguation) =

Campo Belo is a municipality in the Brazilian state of Minas Gerais.

Campo Belo may also refer to:

- Campo Belo (district of São Paulo)
- Campo Belo (São Paulo Metro), metro station in construction
- Campo Belo do Sul, a municipality in the Brazilian state of Santa Catarina
