= Eucaliptos (São Paulo Metro) =

São Paulo Metro station

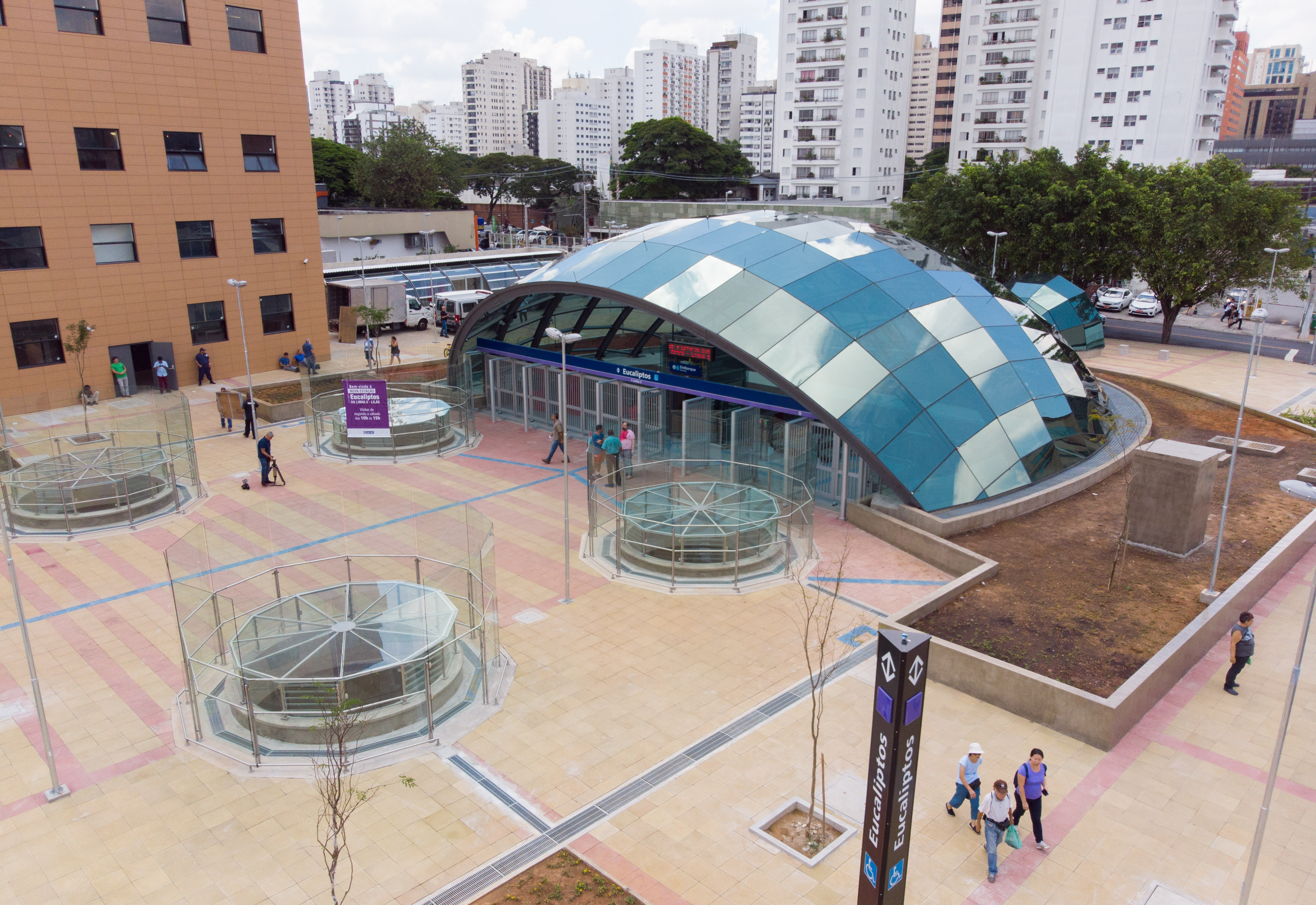

General information
- Location: Av. Ibirapuera, 3144, Moema; São Paulo; Brazil
- Coordinates: 23.61°S 46.668611°W
- Owner: Government of the State of São Paulo
- Operator: Companhia do Metropolitano de São Paulo (2018); Motiva Linhas 5 e 17 (2018–2038)
- Platforms: Island platforms
- Connections: José Diniz–Ibirapuera–Santa Cruz Bus Corridor

Construction
- Structure type: Underground
- Accessible: y

Other information
- Station code: ECT

History
- Opened: March 2, 2018
- Former names: Ibirapuera

Services
Preceding station	São Paulo Metro	Following station
Campo Belo towards Capão Redondo	Line 5	Moema towards Chácara Klabin
Track layout
Location

Eucaliptos is a metro station on Line 5 (Lilac) of the São Paulo Metro in the Moema district of São Paulo, Brazil.
