= Morumbi (disambiguation) =

Morumbi is a district of the city of São Paulo, Brazil.

Morumbi may also refer to:

- Estádio do Morumbi, stadium in São Paulo, Brazil, home of São Paulo Futebol Clube
- São Paulo–Morumbi, a metro station
