= Subprefecture of Santo Amaro =

Coordinates: 23°39′S 46°42′W

- Subprefecture
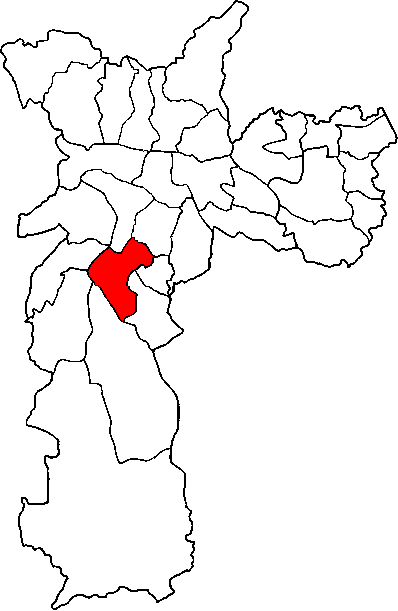
- Location of Santo Amaro within the municipality of São Paulo

- Location of the municipality of São Paulo within the State of São Paulo
- Country: Brazil
- Region: Southeast
- State: São Paulo
- Municipality: São Paulo
- Administrative Zone: South-Central
- Districts: Santo Amaro, Campo Belo, Campo Grande

Government
  - Type: Subprefecture
  - Subprefect: Silvio Rocha de Oliveira Junior

Area
  - Total: 37.75 km^{2} (14.58 sq mi)

Population (2022)
  - Total: 272.332
  - Density: 7,214.1/km^{2} (18,684/sq mi)
- Website: prefeitura.sp.gov.br/santo_amaro/

The Subprefecture of Santo Amaro is one of 32 subprefectures of the city of São Paulo, Brazil, comprising three districts: Santo Amaro, Campo Belo, and Campo Grande. It was formerly a separate municipality from 1832 until 1935, when it was incorporated into the city of São Paulo.

The subprefecture covers an area of 37.75 km² (14.58 sq mi), with a population of 272.332 recorded by the 2022 Brazilian census.

Santo Amaro hosts São Paulo–Congonhas Airport, the city's second busiest airport, and the Brazilian headquarters of many international corporations such as Deloitte, SAP, Oracle, KPMG, Cargill, Electrolux and PepsiCo, as well as those of Brazilian companies Banco Votorantim, Claro and Vivo. This subprefecture also features many theatres and concert halls and is the site of the famous cable-stayed Octávio Frias de Oliveira Bridge, one of the engineering landmarks of São Paulo, connecting it to the Subprefecture of Butantã, on the other side of Pinheiros River.

== See also ==
- Roman Catholic Diocese of Santo Amaro
