= Campo Grande (district of São Paulo) =

District of São Paulo, Brazil

Coordinates: 23.6846°S 46.6825°W

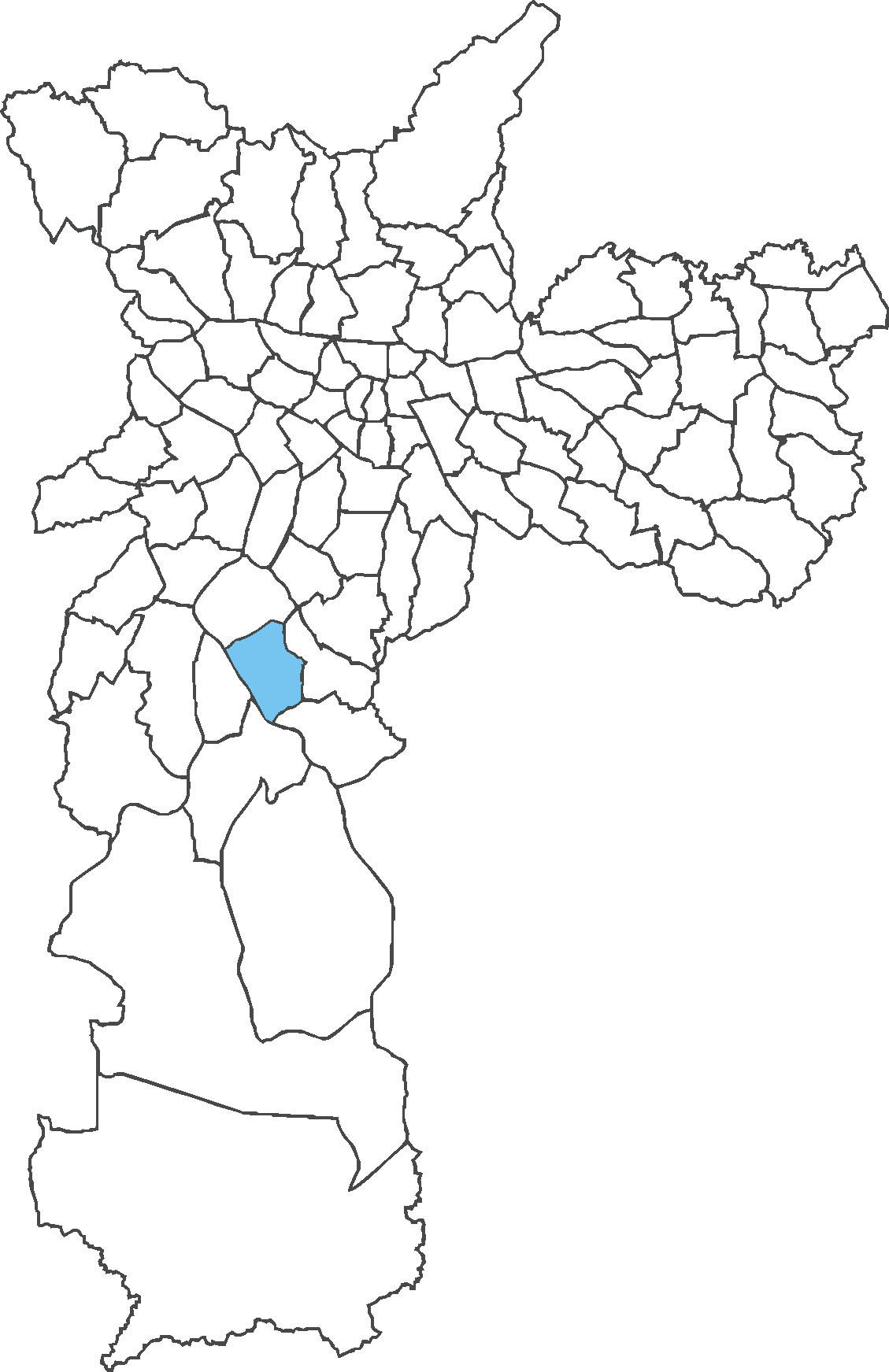
- District of the city of São Paulo
- Country: Brazil
- State: São Paulo
- Municipality: São Paulo
- Subprefecture: Santo Amaro

Area
  - Total: 13.10 km^{2} (5.06 sq mi)

Population (2007)
  - Total: 100,713
  - Density: 7,688/km^{2} (19,910/sq mi)
- Website: Subprefecture of Santo Amaro

Campo Grande is one of 96 districts in the city of São Paulo, Brazil.

== See also ==
- Roman Catholic Diocese of Santo Amaro
