= Aeroporto de Congonhas (São Paulo Metro) =

Future railway station in São Paulo, Brazil

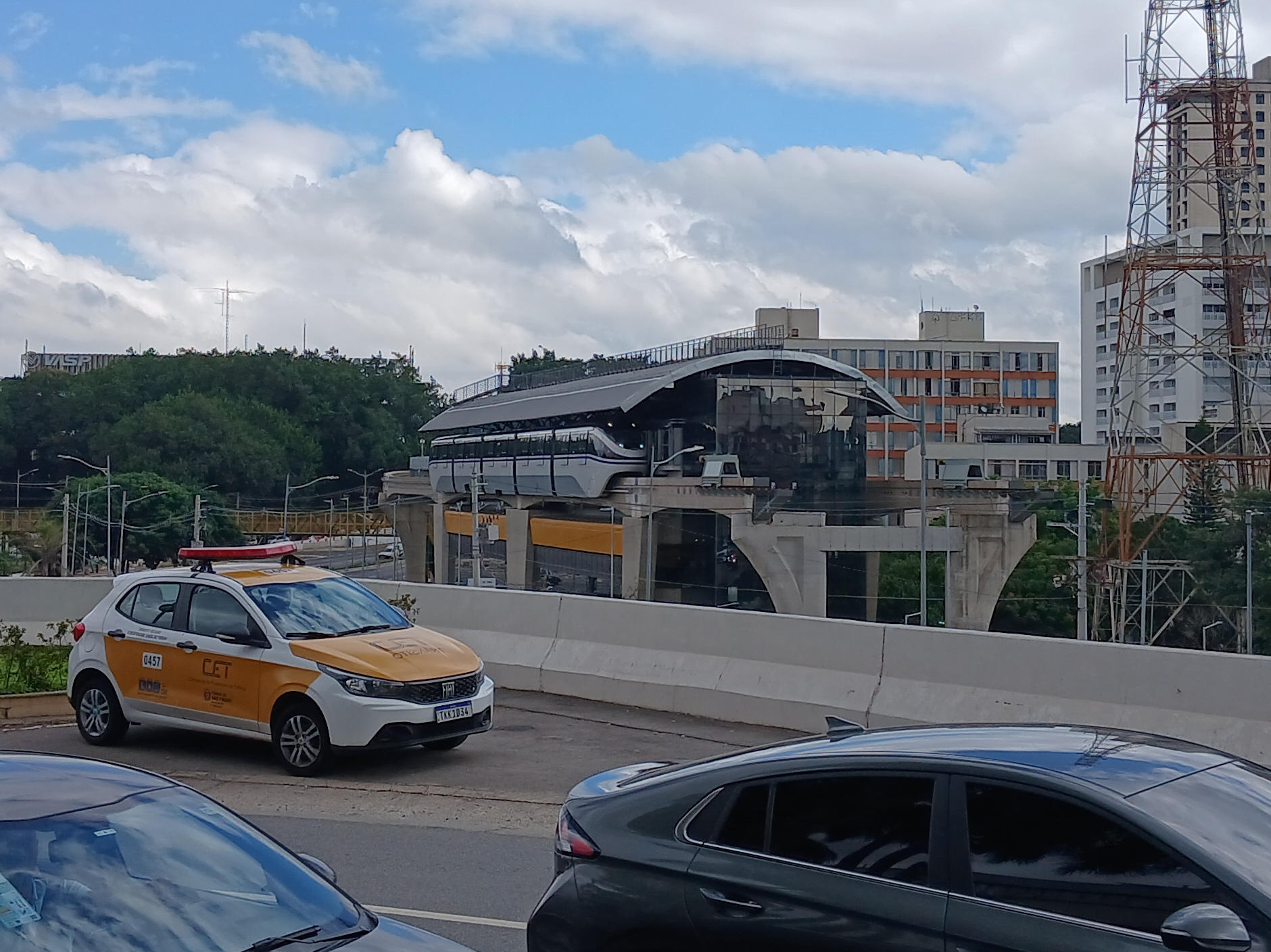
- the station as seen from the airport

General information
- Location: Av. Washington Luís × R. Rafael Lório, Campo Belo; São Paulo; Brazil
- Coordinates: 23°37′37″S 46°39′42″W
- Owner: Government of the State of São Paulo
- Operator: Motiva Linhas 5 e 17
- Platforms: Island platforms
- Connections: São Paulo–Congonhas Airport

Construction
- Structure type: Elevated
- Accessible: Yes

Other information
- Station code: CGN

History
- Opening: 31 March 2026
- Former names: Congonhas

Services
Preceding station	São Paulo Metro	Following station
Brooklin Paulista towards Morumbi	Line 17	Terminus
Track layout
Location

Aeroporto de Congonhas is a monorail station on São Paulo Metro's Line 17-Gold, connecting Line 9-Emerald and Congonhas Airport. The station is located at the crossing of Avenida Washington Luís with Rua Rafael Lório. The station features a tunnel across Avenida Washington Luís, which connects directly with the lower lobby of the airport terminal.

== History ==
Initially, as per the São Paulo Metro expansion plans, Line 17-Gold should have opened in 2014, connecting with São Paulo–Morumbi station of Line 4-Yellow. At the time, Morumbi Stadium was considered one of the hosts for 2014 FIFA World Cup. The opening of the line was then delayed to 2016, end of 2017, 2018, end of 2020, middle of 2021, middle of 2022, and finally middle of 2026.

== Station layout ==
P Platform level
P Platform level	Westbound	← toward Morumbi
P Platform level	Island platform, doors open on the left or right
P Platform level	Westbound	← toward Morumbi
M	Mezzanine	Fare control, ticket office, customer service, Bilhete Único/TOP recharge machines
G	Street level	Exit/entrance
U	Underground	Tunnel to São Paulo–Congonhas Airport
