= Washington Luís (São Paulo Metro) =

Future railway station in São Paulo, Brazil

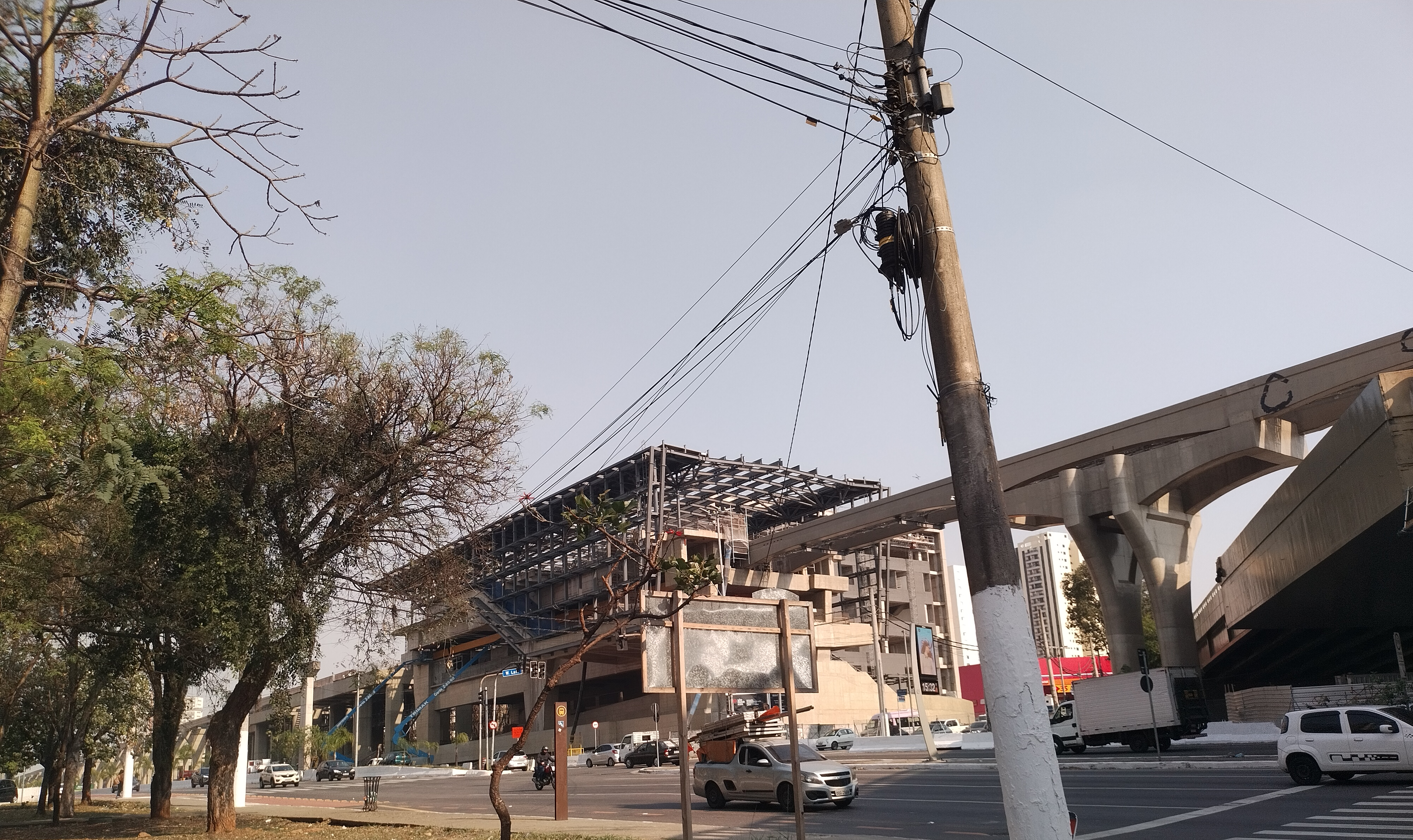
- Construction works in 2024

General information
- Location: Av. Jornalista Roberto Marinho × Av. Washington Luís, Campo Belo; São Paulo; Brazil
- Coordinates: 23°38′05″S 46°40′06″W
- Owner: Government of the State of São Paulo
- Operator: Motiva Linhas 5 e 17
- Platforms: Side platforms

Construction
- Structure type: Elevated
- Accessible: Yes

Other information
- Station code: JDA

History
- Opened: 30 June 2026
- Former names: Jardim Aeroporto

Services
Preceding station	São Paulo Metro	Following station
Brooklin Paulista towards Morumbi	Line 17	Terminus
Track layout
Location

Washington Luís is a monorail station of Line 17-Gold of Motiva Linhas 5 e 17, which connects Line 9-Emerald to Congonhas Airport.

Washington Luís station is located in the crossing of Avenida Jornalista Roberto Marinho with Avenida Washington Luís.

Initially, in the São Paulo Metro expansion plans, Line 17-Gold should be open until 2014, connecting with São Paulo–Morumbi station of Line 4-Yellow, at the time that Morumbi Stadium was considered one of the hosts for 2014 FIFA World Cup.

After that, the promise of opening of the line was delayed to 2016, end of 2017, 2018, December 2020, mid of 2021, and, currently, to 2nd semester of 2022.

== Station layout ==
P Platform level
P Platform level	Side platform, doors open on the left
P Platform level	Westbound	← toward Morumbi
P Platform level	Westbound	← toward Morumbi
P Platform level	Side platform, doors open on the right
M	Mezzanine	Fare control, ticket office, customer service, Bilhete Único/TOP recharge machines
G	Street level	Exit/entrance
