= São Judas (São Paulo Metro) =

São Paulo Metro station

General information
- Location: 2438 Avenida Jabaquara; São Paulo; Brazil
- Coordinates: 23.625609°S 46.64075°W
- Owner: Government of the State of São Paulo
- Operator: Companhia do Metropolitano de São Paulo
- Platforms: Side platforms
- Connections: SPTrans bus lines

Construction
- Structure type: Underground
- Accessible: y

Other information
- Station code: JUD

History
- Opened: September 14, 1974

Passengers
- 16,000/business day

Services
Preceding station	São Paulo Metro	Following station
Saúde towards Tucuruvi	Line 1	Conceição towards Jabaquara
Track layout
Location

São Judas is a station on Line 1 (Blue) of the São Paulo Metro. It will be integrated with the planned Line 20 (Pink).

== SPTrans lines ==
The following SPTrans bus lines can be accessed. Passengers may use a Bilhete Único card for transfer:

Line #	Line Name
4742-10	Jd.Clímax
5091-10	Jd.Ubirajara (Circular)
609J-10	Aeroporto
675A-10	Parque Santo Antonio(Centro Empresarial)
675L-10	Term.João Dias
