= Morumbi (São Paulo Metro) =

Monorail station in Brazil

General information
- Location: Av. das Nações Unidas, 14171, Santo Amaro; São Paulo; Brazil
- Coordinates: 23°37′18″S 46°42′06″W
- Owner: Government of the State of São Paulo
- Operator: Motiva Linhas 5 e 17
- Platforms: Side platforms
- Connections: Diadema–Morumbi Metropolitan Corridor

Construction
- Structure type: Elevated
- Accessible: Yes

History
- Opened: 31 March 2026

Services
Preceding station	São Paulo Metro	Following station
Terminus	Line 17	Chucri Zaidan towards Aeroporto de Congonhas or Washington Luís

Out-of-system interchange
Preceding station	São Paulo Metropolitan Trains	Following station
Berrini towards Osasco	Line 9 transfer at Morumbi	Granja Julieta towards Varginha
Track layout
Location

Morumbi is a monorail station, which is operated by Motiva Linhas 5 e 17. Placed in the district of Santo Amaro in São Paulo, it is connected with homonymous station of Line 9-Emerald.

== History ==
In 2010, it was presented the project of Line 17 of São Paulo Metro, with a connection station project beside the CPTM station. In 2011, the construction was started, but it was interrupted many times because of legal problem between the Metro and builder companies. Currently, is in process of bidding, with conclusion scheduled to mid of 2022.

== Toponymy ==
The word "Morumbi" is an indigenous term of tupi origin that can mean "green fly" (moru: fly, and mbi: green). The ethnologist Eduardo Navarro defends that "Morumbi" has other meanings, as from the tupi maromby, which meaning is "river of the big fishes" (maromba: "big fish"; y: "river"), or marumbi, term of Portuguese language that means "lagoon full of taboas".

== Station layout ==
P Platform level
P Platform level	Side platform, doors open on the right
P Platform level	Eastbound	toward Aeroporto de Congonhas/Washington Luis →
P Platform level	Eastbound	toward Aeroporto de Congonhas/Washington Luis →
P Platform level	Side platform, doors open on the left
M	Concourse	Fare control, ticket office, customer service, Bilhete Único/TOP recharge machines, transfer between and
G	Street level	Exit/entrance
