= São Paulo–Morumbi (São Paulo Metro) =

São Paulo Metro station

São Paulo-Morumbi
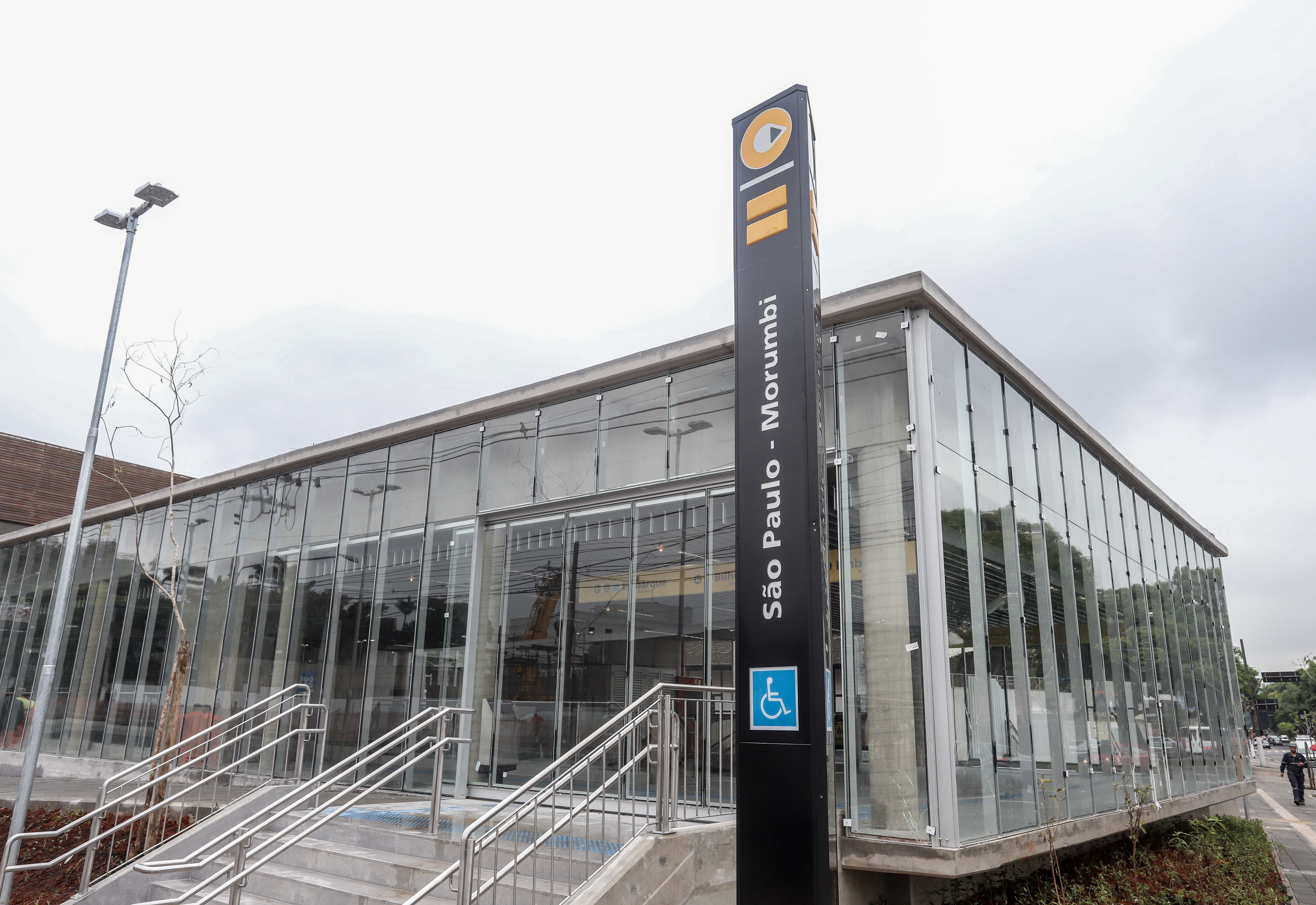

General information
- Location: Av. Dep. Jacob Salvador Zveibil, 50, Butantã; São Paulo; Brazil
- Coordinates: 23.586111°S 46.723889°W
- Owner: Government of the State of São Paulo
- Operator: Motiva Linha 4
- Platforms: Side platforms
- Connections: Morumbi Bus Terminal; Campo Limpo–Rebouças–Centro Bus Corridor

Construction
- Structure type: Underground
- Accessible: y

Other information
- Station code: MBI

History
- Opened: 27 October 2018; 7 years ago
- Former names: Morumbi

Passengers
- 41,250/business day

Services
Preceding station	São Paulo Metro	Following station
Vila Sônia-Professora Elisabeth Tenreiro Terminus	Line 4	Butantã towards Luz
Future services
Terminus	Line 17	Estádio Morumbi towards Aeroporto de Congonhas or Washington Luís
Track layout
Location

São Paulo-Morumbi is a metro station on Line 4-Yellow of the São Paulo Metro operated by Motiva Linha 4. It is localized in the crossing of Av. Professor Francisco Morato and Av. Jorge João Saad, in the district of Butantã, West Side of São Paulo, next to Morumbi Stadium.

The initial opening date was scheduled to 2012, being delayed to 2015, 2017, until it was finally opened on 27 October 2018, working in full time since 10 November 2018. Besides that, it was opened without the urban bus terminal, which was opened two months after the station, of 29 December 2018.

The construction of the station on Line 17-Gold was interrupted because of the lack of the State resources, being in phase of services rescheduling, conditioned to obtain budgetary allocation.

== Toponymy ==
The word "Morumbi" is an indigenous term of tupi origin that can mean "green fly" (moru: fly, and mbi: green). The ethnologist Eduardo Navarro states that "Morumbi" has other meanings, as from the tupi maromby, which meaning is "river of the big fishes" (maromba: "big fish"; y: "river"), or marumbi, term of Portuguese language that means "lagoon full of taboas".

The name symbolizes the district of Morumbi, as the station is localized between the districts of Morumbi and Butantã. Since the project until mid 2006, the project name of the station was "Morumbi". Because of a political movement aiming at the votes of soccer fans, many stations had their names changed to honor soccer teams of São Paulo. Therefore, station Morumbi had its project name changed to "São Paulo-Morumbi".

== Station layout ==
G	Street level	Exit/entrance
M1	Concourse level 1	Fare control, ticket office, customer service, Bilhete Único/TOP recharge machines
M2	Concourse level 2	Distribution concourse
P Platform level
P Platform level	Side platform, doors open on the left
P Platform level	Southbound	← toward Vila Sônia–Professora Elisabeth Tenreiro
P Platform level	Northbound	toward Luz →
P Platform level	Side platform, doors open on the right
