= São Paulo Metro =

Rapid transit system in São Paulo, Brazil

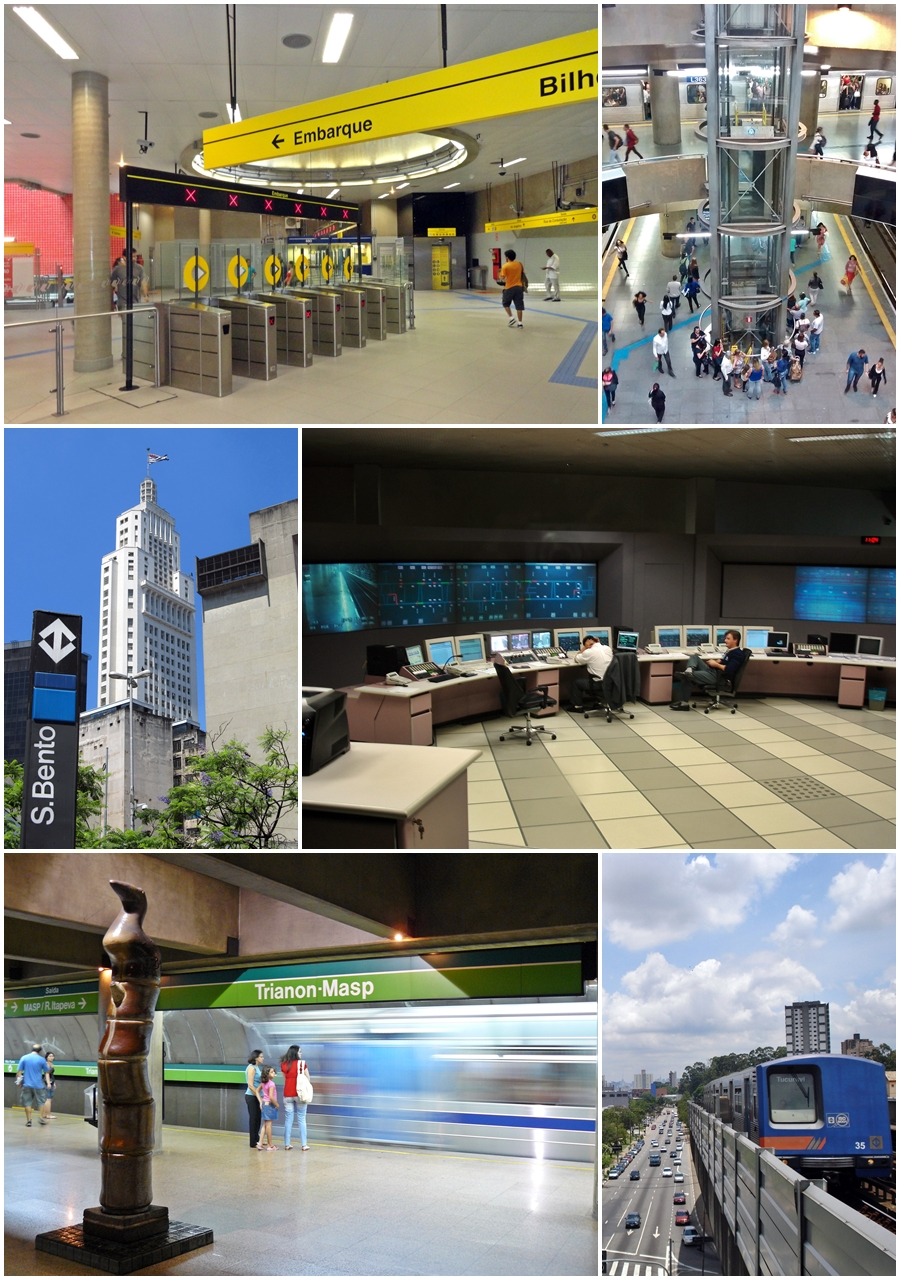

Overview
- Native name: Metrô de São Paulo
- Locale: São Paulo, Brazil
- Transit type: Rapid transit
- Number of lines: 8 (metro only); 15 (complete network)
- Line number: Line 1 (São Paulo Metro) Line 2 (São Paulo Metro) Line 3 (São Paulo Metro) Line 4 (São Paulo Metro) Line 5 (São Paulo Metro) Line 6 (São Paulo Metro) Line 15 (São Paulo Metro) Line 17 (São Paulo Metro)
- Number of stations: 105 (metro only); 196 (complete network)
- Daily ridership: 4.2 million (2025)
- Annual ridership: 1,265 billion (2025)
- Website: Metrô (in Portuguese); Motiva Linha 4 (in Portuguese); Motiva Linhas 5 e 17 (in Portuguese); LinhaUni (in Portuguese)

Operation
- Began operation: 14 September 1974; 52 years ago
- Operators: Companhia do Metropolitano de São Paulo (Lines 1, 2, 3, 15); Motiva Linha 4 (Line 4); Motiva Linhas 5 e 17 (Lines 5, 17); LinhaUni (Line 6)
- Headway: 1′40" to 3′

Technical
- System length: 116.2 km (72.2 mi)(Metro only); 393 km (244 mi) (complete network)
- Track gauge: 1,600 mm (5 ft 3 in) (Lines 1-3); 1,435 mm (4 ft 8 1/2 in) (Lines 4-6); 680 mm (2 ft 2 3/4 in) (Line 15); 800 mm (2 ft 7 1/2 in) (Line 17)
- Electrification: Third rail, 750 V DC (Line 1, 2, 3, 6, 15, 17); Overhead line, 1,500 V DC (Line 4–5)
- Average speed: 60 km/h (37 mph)
- Top speed: 87 km/h (54 mph) (Lines 1–3); 80 km/h (50 mph) (Lines 4–5, 15, 17)

The São Paulo Metro (Portuguese: Metrô de São Paulo, [meˈtɾo dʒi sɐ̃w ˈpawlu]), commonly called the Metrô, is one of the rapid transit companies serving the city of São Paulo, alongside the São Paulo Metropolitan Trains Company (CPTM), Motiva Linha 4, Motiva Linhas 5 e 17, ViaMobilidade Linhas 8 e 9 and TIC Trens, all five forming the largest metropolitan rail transport network of Latin America. The metro system carries about 4,200,000 passengers a day.

The seven lines in the metro system operate on 116 kilometres (72 mi) of route, serving 106 stations. It is complemented by a network of metropolitan trains, which serve the city of São Paulo and the São Paulo Metropolitan Region. The systems combined form a 393 km (244 mi) long network, all accessible via one single ticket.

Considered the most modern in Latin America, the system is the first to install platform screen doors at a station, and use communications-based train control with lines 4 and 15 being fully automated. Line 15 is a monorail line that partially opened for service in 2014 and is the first high capacity monorail line of Latin America. The São Paulo Metro and CPTM both operate as State-owned companies and have received awards in the recent past as one of the cleanest systems in the world by ISO 9001. Motiva Linha 4, Motiva Linhas 5 e 17, ViaMobilidade Linhas 8 e 9 and TIC Trens are private-owned companies. The São Paulo Metro was voted as one of the best American metros at the MetroRail 2010 industry conference and has been frequently chosen as one of the best metro systems in the world by specialist media outlets such as CNN and Business Insider, being the only system in Latin America to make the list.

== History ==
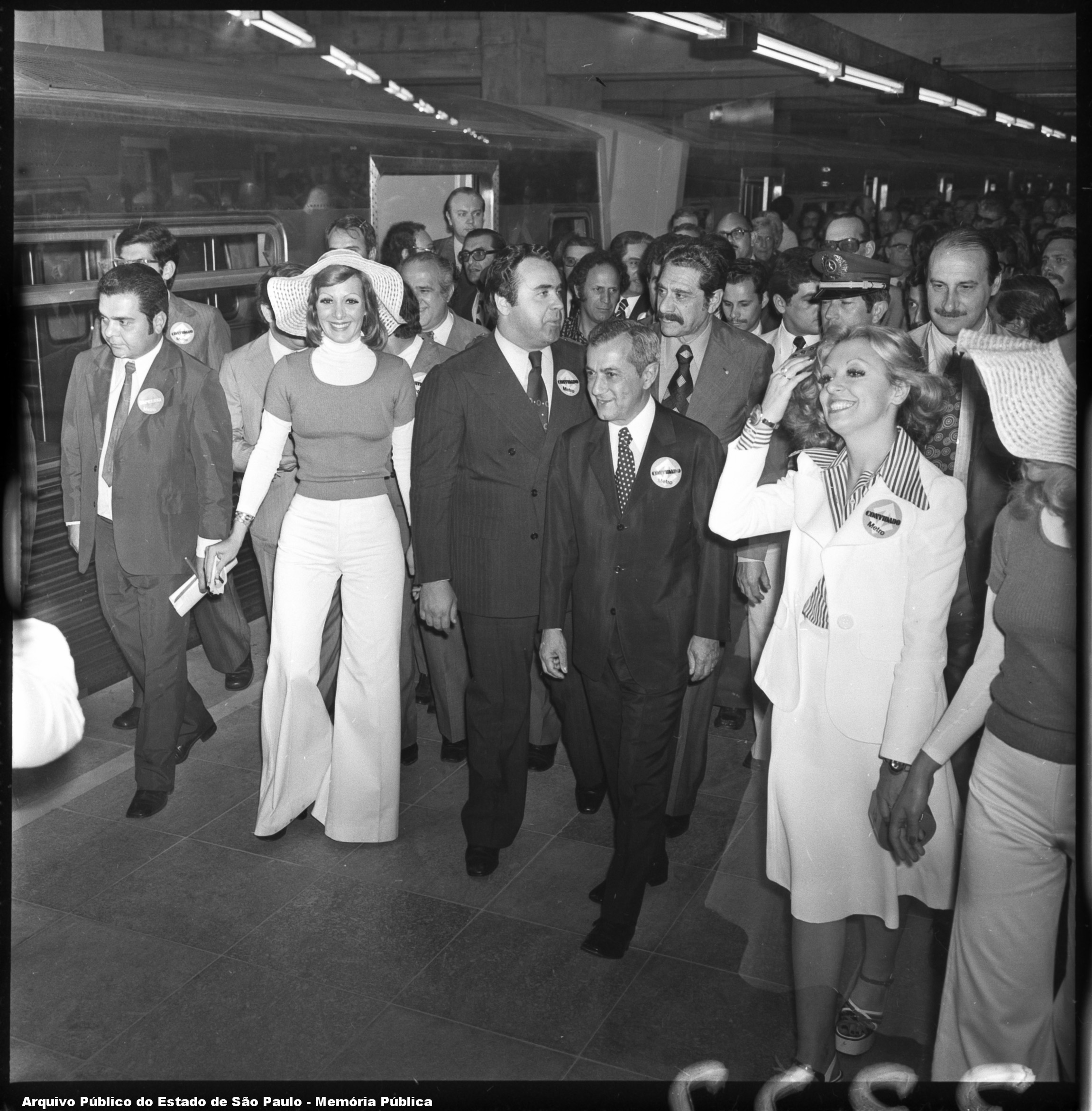
Opening of São Paulo Metro in 1974. At the center, Mayor Miguel Colasuonno and Governor Laudo Natel.

The Companhia do Metropolitano de São Paulo (Metrô) was founded on April 24, 1968. Eight months later, work on the initial North–South line (now Line 1 - Blue) was initiated. In 1972, the first test train trip occurred between Jabaquara and Saúde stations. On September 14, 1974, the segment between Jabaquara and Vila Mariana entered into commercial operation.

The first line, Norte/Sul (North/South), later renamed "Blue Line" or Line 1 - Blue, was opened on September 18, 1972, with an experimental operation between Saúde and Jabaquara stations. Commercial operations started on September 14, 1974, after an eight-year "gestation" period that began in 1966, under Mayor Faria Lima's administration. Expansion of the metro system includes new lines. As of late 2004, construction began on a US$1 billion, 12.8 km (8.0 mi) all-underground line (Line 4 - Yellow), with eleven stations, aimed at transporting almost one million people per day. By 2004, Line 2 was also being expanded, with two new stations opening in 2006 and another one in 2007.

A 10.5-kilometre (6.5 mi) expansion of Line 5 was completed in 2018.

As of January 2026, tickets cost R$5.40 ($ 1.00). In 2006, the São Paulo Metro system has started to use a smart card, called "Bilhete Único" (or "Single Ticket" in English).

== Current operational data ==
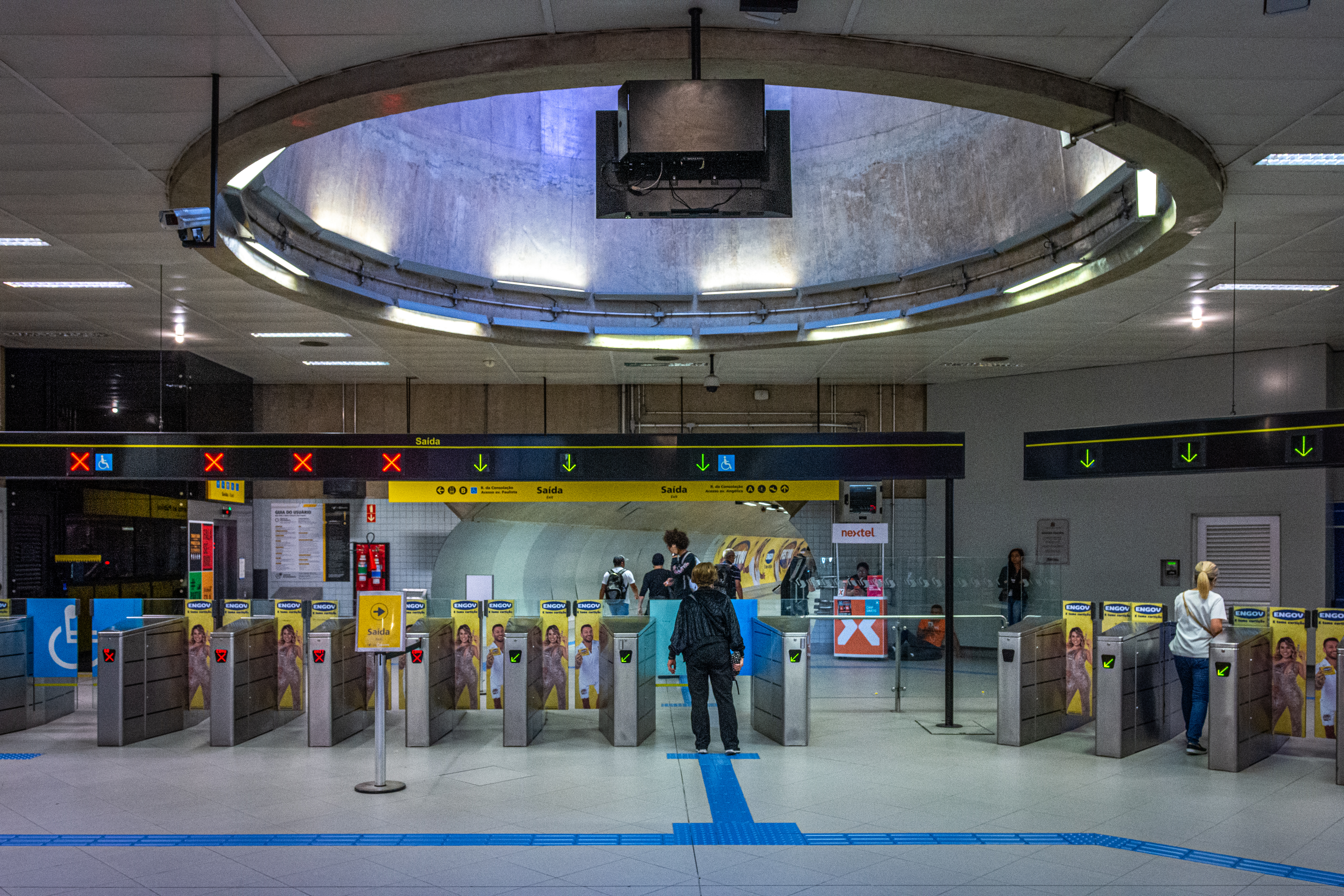
Paulista Station on Line 4

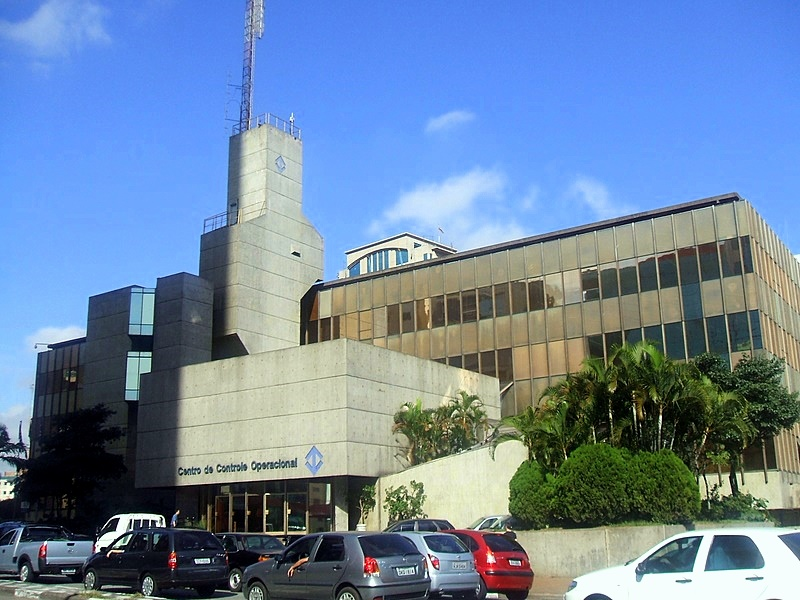
Operational control center of the São Paulo metro.

The metro system consists of six color-coded lines: Line 1 (Blue), Line 2 (Green), Line 3 (Red), Line 4 (Yellow), Line 5 (Lilac) and Line 15 (Silver), operating from Sunday to Saturday, from 4:40 AM to midnight. Line 15 (Silver), is a high-capacity monorail, the rest being standard, heavy rail rapid transit lines.

The six lines achieved an average weekday ridership of 5.3 million in 2019. On 14 September 2019, Metrô recorded the highest ever ridership figure of 5.5 million on a single business day, caused by the recent expansion of some lines. The Metro provided 1.49 billion rides over the course of 2019.

== Technology ==
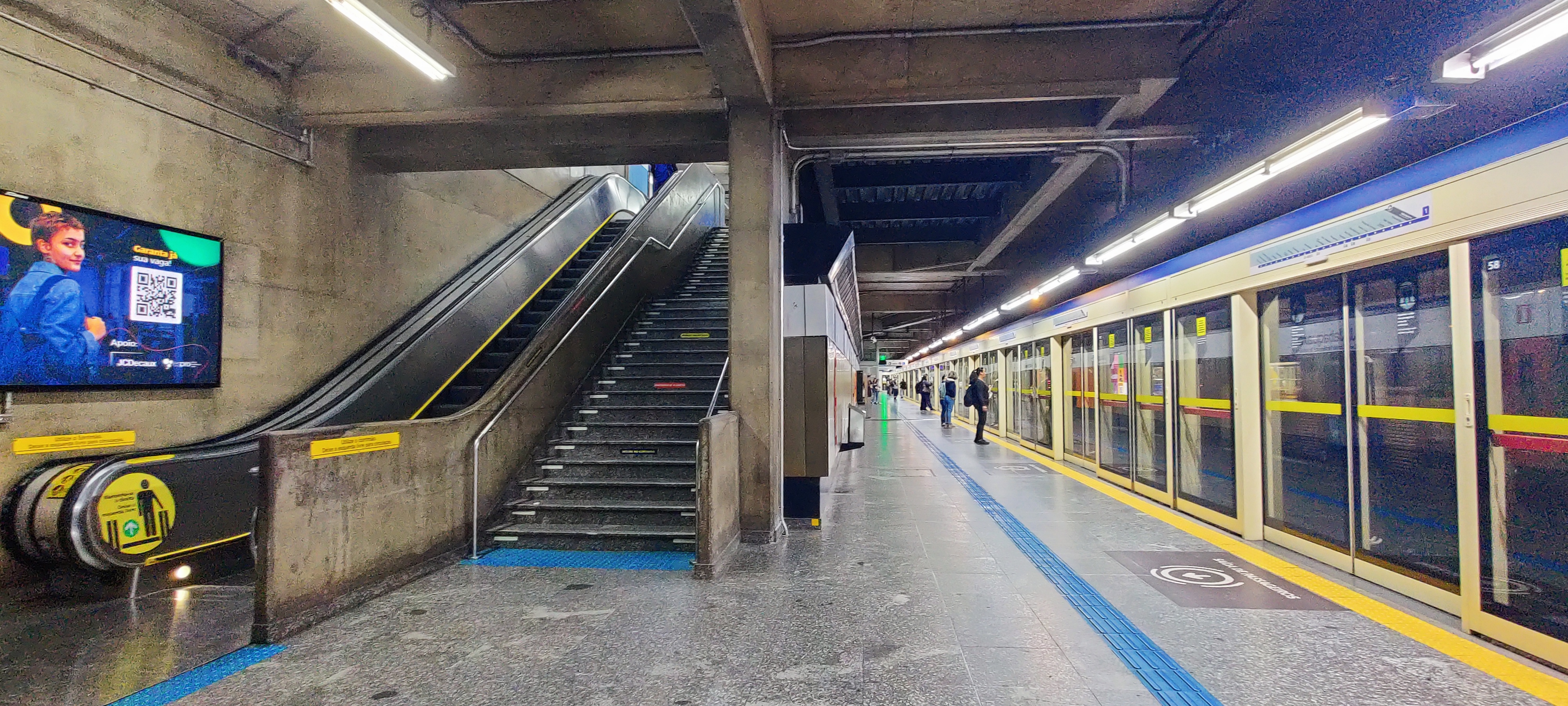
Jabaquara station, inaugurated in 1974 and modernized in 2022

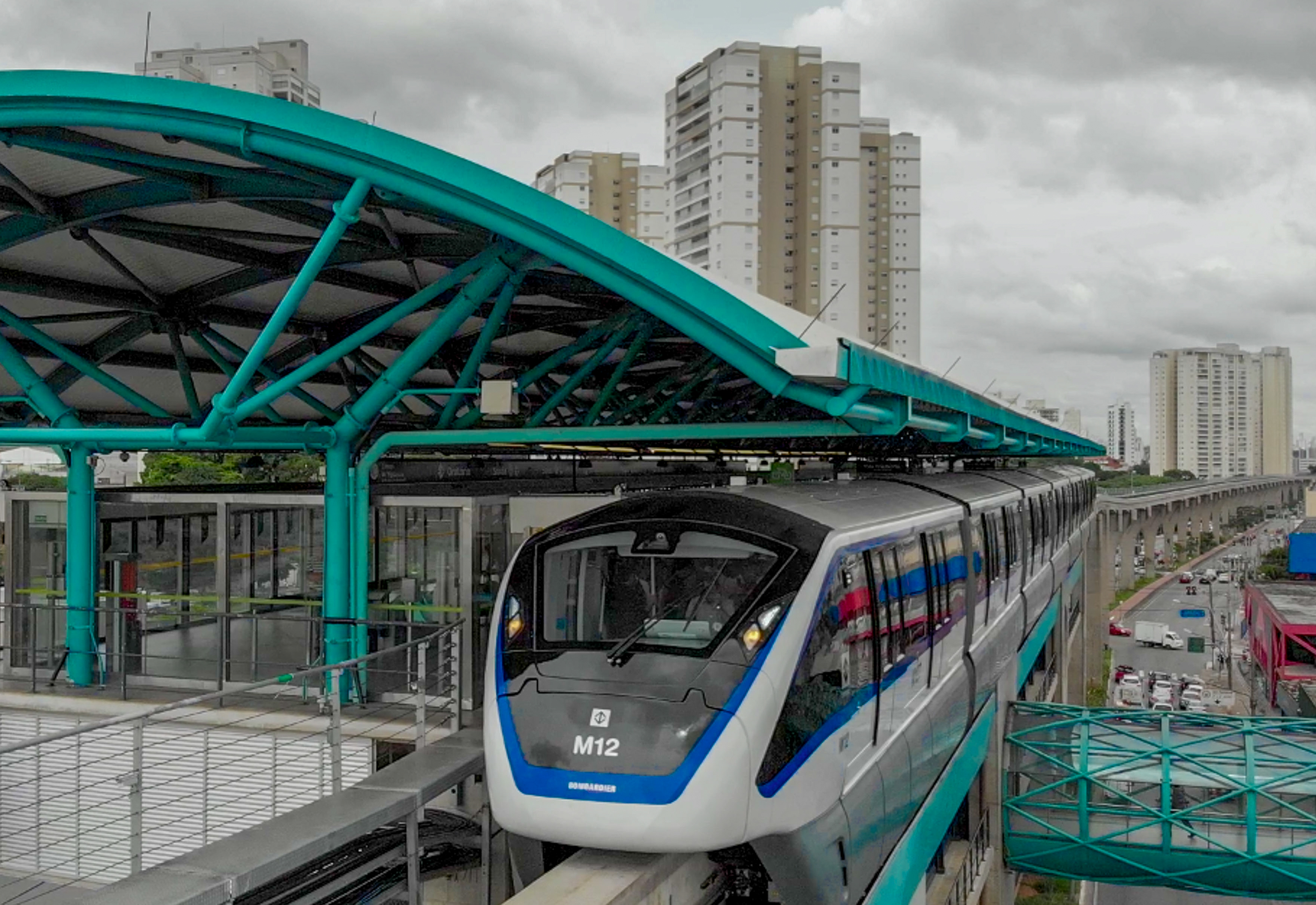
Line 15

The São Paulo Metro has been at the technological forefront not only in Latin America but also worldwide, since the conception of its first line in the 1960s. In 1971, the São Paulo Metro selected the American company Westinghouse Electric Corporation (WELCO) to install the ATO (Automatic Train Operation) system, which provides fully automated train signaling and control. This system was also used by the San Francisco BART, which at the time was considered the most modern metro system in the world.

The ATO system implemented by the São Paulo Metro since its first line allowed for the fully automatic operation of trains, including the safety of train movement and the activation of doors. The train operator was only responsible for acting in case of abnormalities, announcing the next station via the public address system, and monitoring operations at stations to prevent accidents with users.

In 2008, the São Paulo Metro selected Alstom Brazil to install the modern CBTC system on all operating lines. The first to have this system working was Line 2 - Green, which was not only the first metro line in São Paulo to operate with such a system but also the first in all of Latin America. When Sacomã station was inaugurated in 2010, this line was considered the most modern in all of the Americas, being the first to feature platform screen doors.

Shortly after, the São Paulo Metro inaugurated Line 4 - Yellow, the first line to operate with driverless trains, once again renewing its title as the most modern metro in Latin America.

In 2022, trains operate on Line 3 with ATO signaling, however, this branch is already being modernized to CBTC, while Lines 1, 2, 4, 5 and 15 already operate with this system, with lines 4 and 15 being driverless (UTO).

== Bus terminals ==
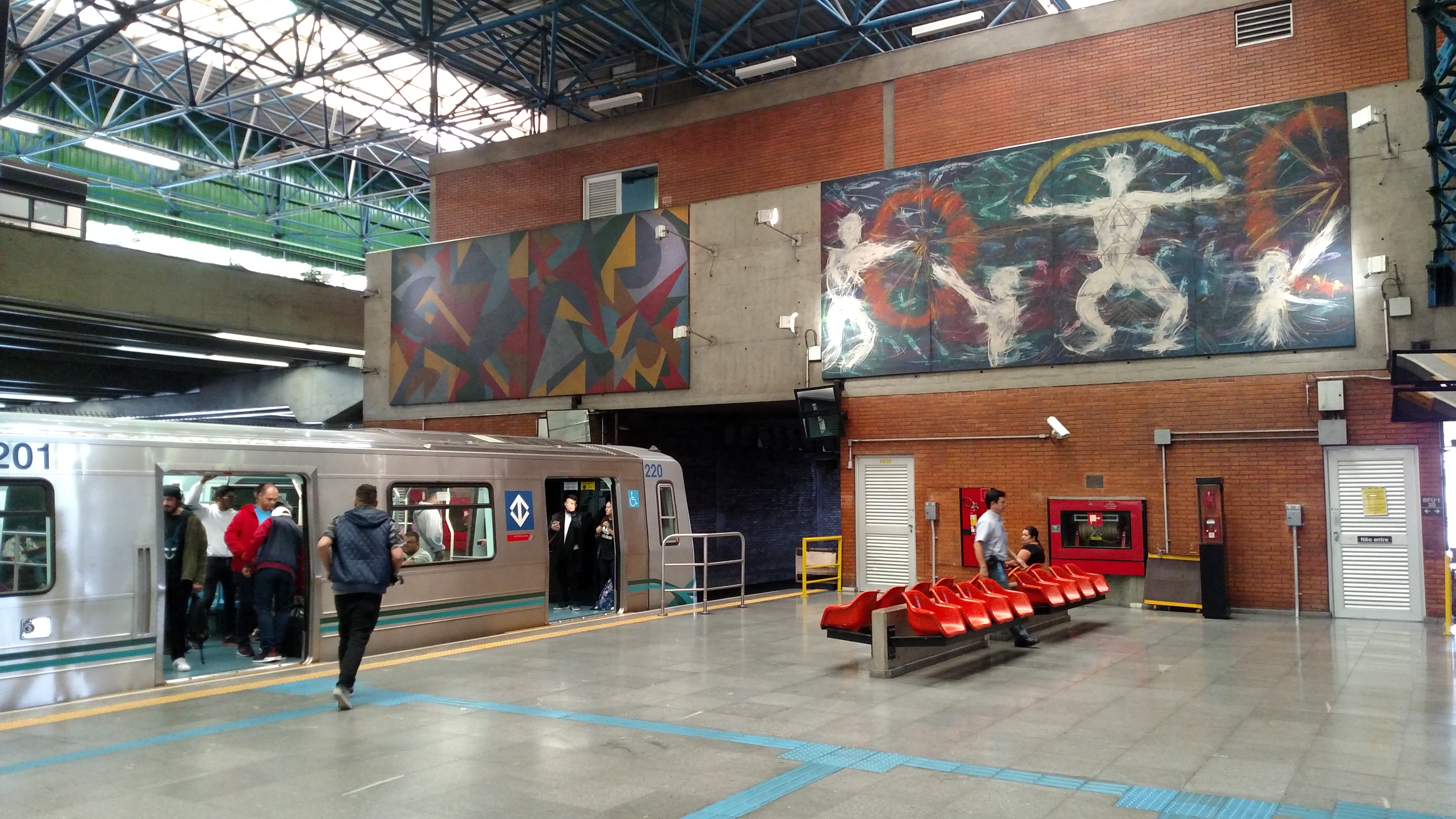
Palmeiras-Barra Funda Intermodal Terminal on Line 3

In May 1977, Metro assumed the administration and commercial utilization of the Inter-City Jabaquara Intermunicipal Terminal, and inaugurated, in May 1982, the modern Inter-city Tietê Bus Terminal, replacing the former Júlio Prestes Terminal.

This agreement established that Metro would be in charge of the studies for the planning, implementation, and operation of passenger transportation in the municipal district of São Paulo, either directly or through third parties.

Later, the other inter-city bus terminals were integrated into the system, such as Bresser, in January 1988, and Palmeiras-Barra Funda, in December 1989. In January 1990 the inter-city bus terminals were outsourced by Metrô, which through public bidding, contracted Consortium Prima for the administration and commercial utilization of the 4 inter-city bus terminals of the city of São Paulo. This contract included the responsibility for maintenance and conservation of the existing installations, as well as of the expansion and modernisation of the terminals.

== Rolling stock ==
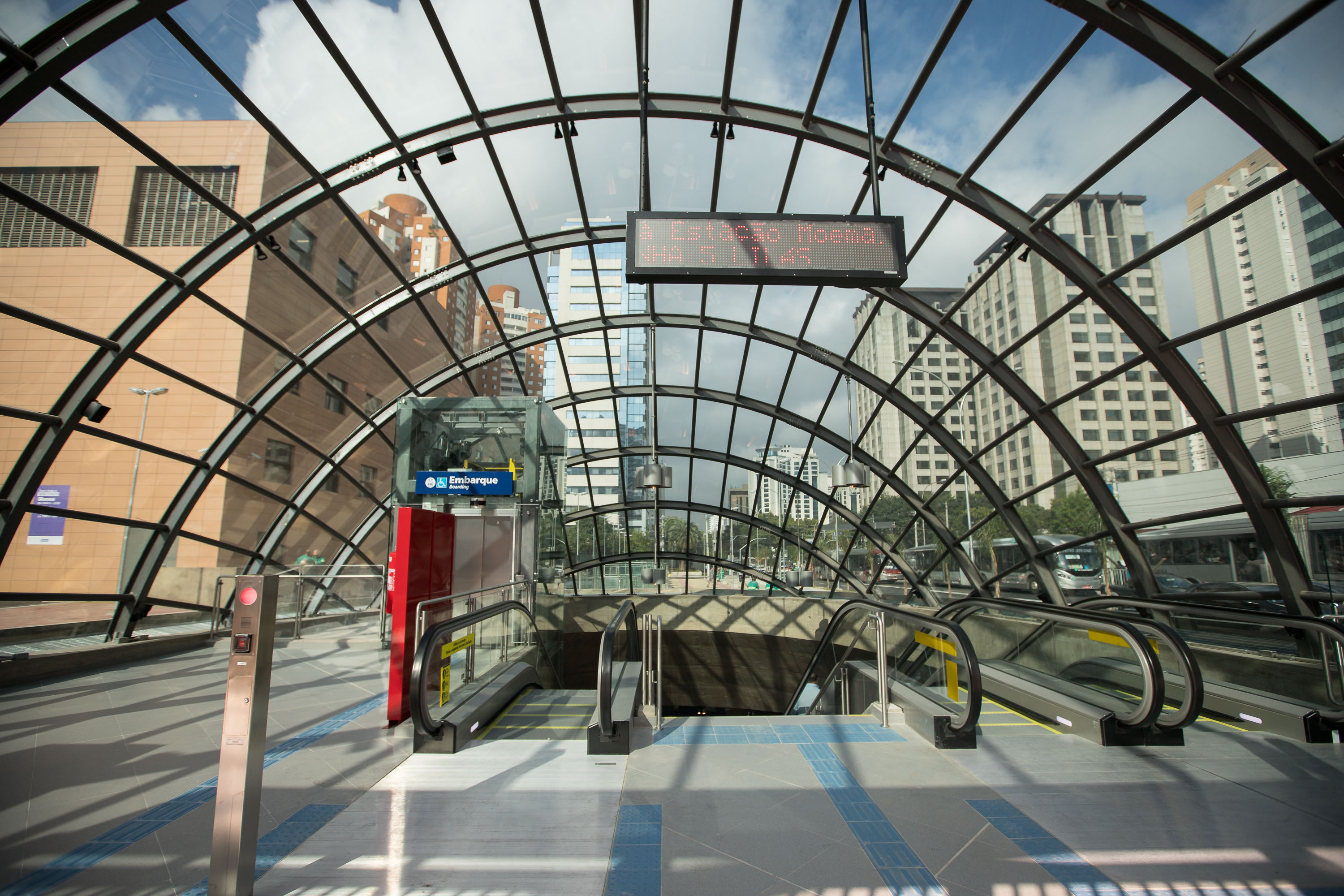
Moema Station, Line 5.

The first cars started operating in 1974, the same year the company's commercial activities were initiated. This model was named A Stock, whose cars received the numbers of 1001 to 1306 (51 trains of 6 cars each). They were designed in United States by the Budd Company, and the national rolling stock manufacturer Mafersa did the final assembly. The model was based on the Class A trains from the Bay Area Rapid Transit system, even using the same Westinghouse 1460 series chopper traction controls, and was to be used along the north–south line, now known as Line 1 - Blue. The initially they operated with two car trains with cars added as demand increased, up to a maximum of six cars. All of them have a pair of electric motors and a cab.

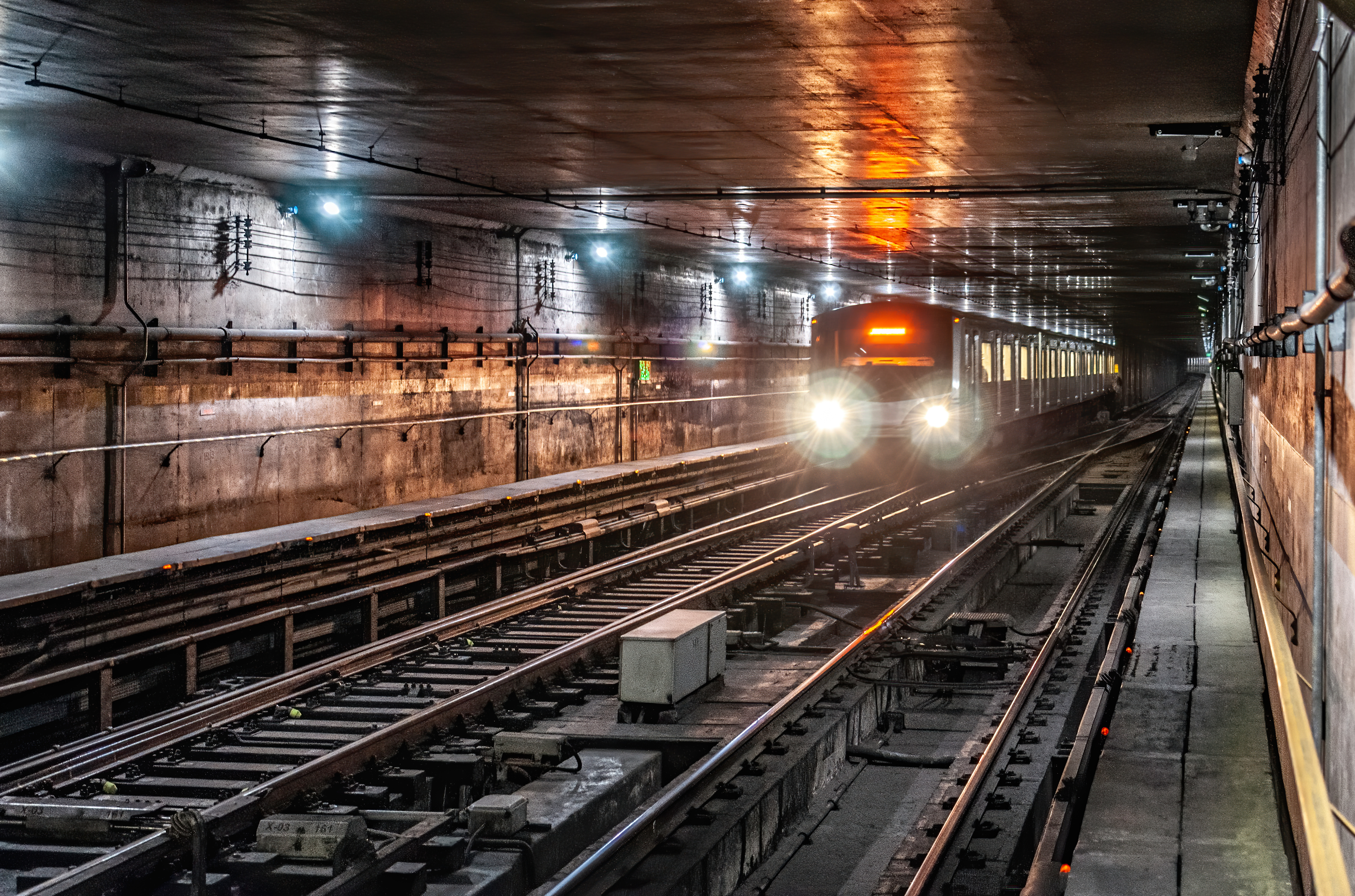
Train of Line 1.

Today, this stock is known as "A stock". The entire "A stock" was planned to be phased out by the beginning of 2015, as the recent modernization processes saw them being converted into two different stocks: I and J. The last A stock train was withdrawn from service in February 2018.

To reduce the manufacturing costs, the Cobrasma company decided to provide, for the East-West Line, now Line 3. Trains had cabs only and made use of more advanced ventilation and maintenance systems. This stock was known by the name of "C". The batch of trains designed for this line were produced by two different national companies, Cobrasma and Mafersa (whose trains got named as "D"). The trains entered service between 1984 and 1986 on Line 3 and remained there for their entire service lives, although in their final years, some of the D stock trains were transferred to Line 1 where they ran with the older A stock trains.

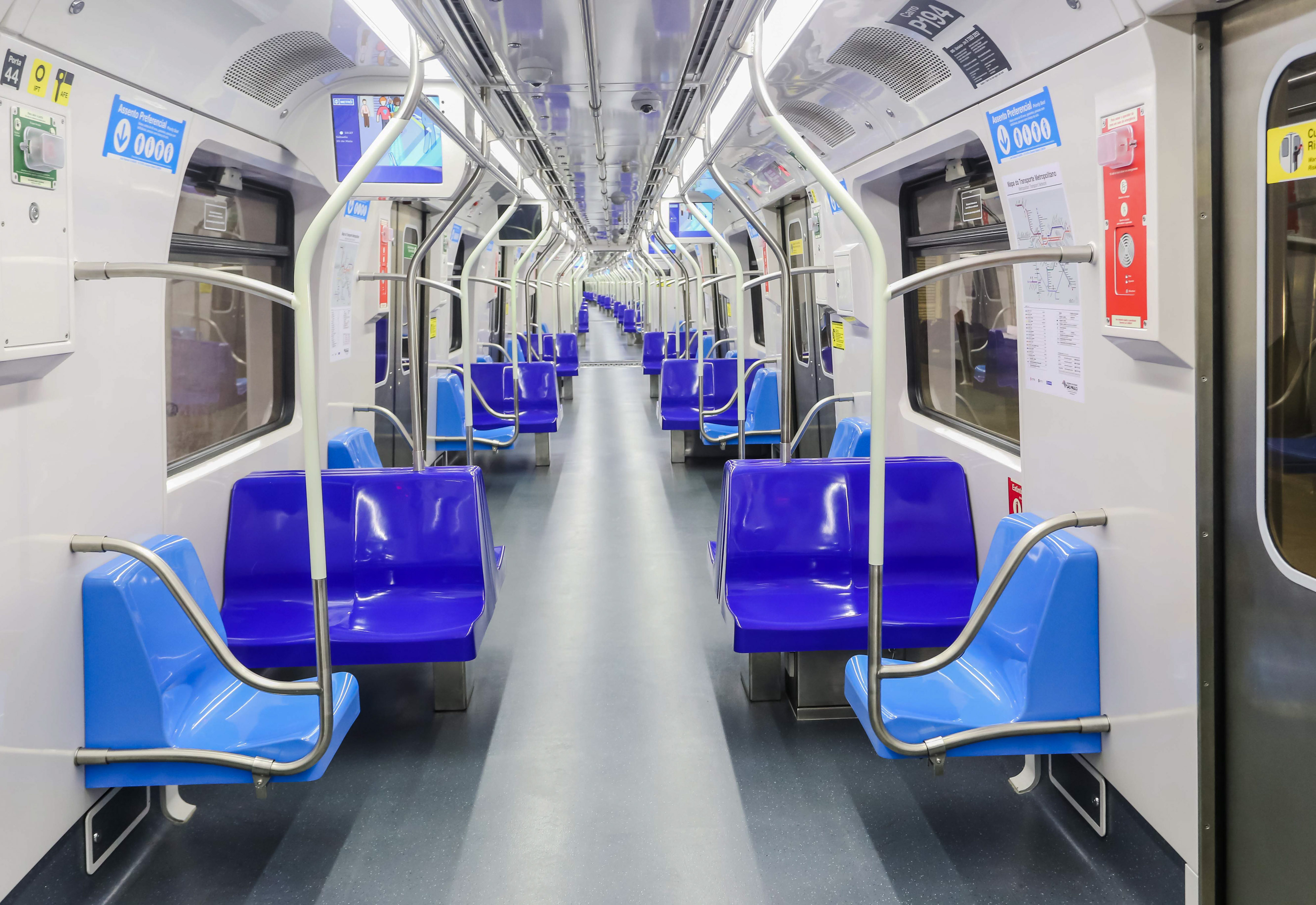
Interior of train P19.

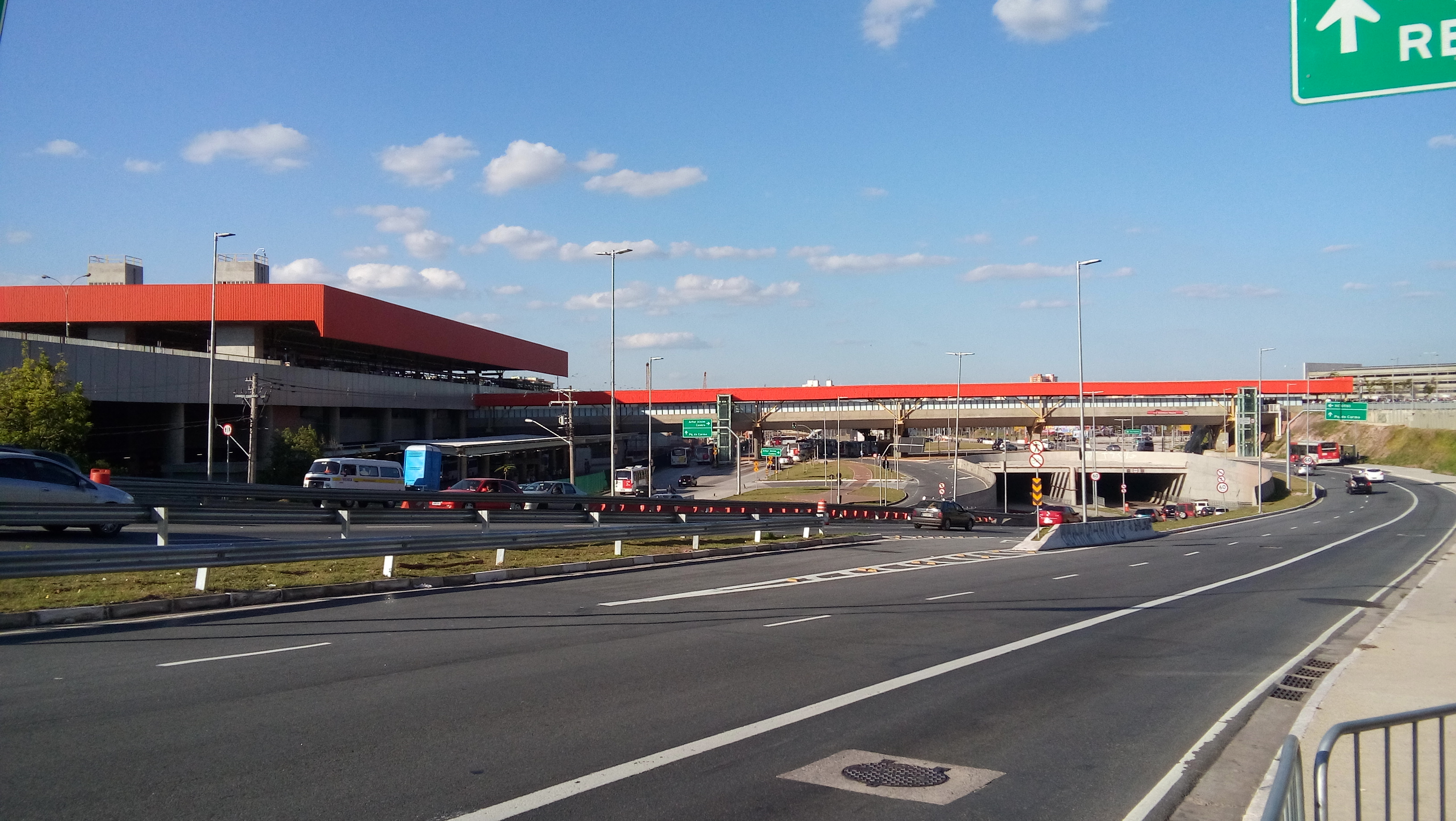
Corinthians-Itaquera Station.

The only difference between the two is the front mask and some structural framework. Their original technical nomenclature was 300. According to it, the C stock was numbered from 301 (C01) to 325 (C25), and the D stock had trains numbered from 326 (D26) to 347 (D47). The C stock trains were already refurbished as K stock and the D stock was refurbished and created the L cars. The refurbishment program for the entire stock of A, C and D trains was completed in 2018.

Today the rolling stock of the São Paulo Metro consists of 11 stocks, 232 trains and 1,419 cars and it is divided as follows:

- E stock: Built by Alstom and entered service between 1998 and 1999. They currently operate on Line 1 - Blue.
- F stock: Alstom trains specially built for Line 5 - Lilac between 2001 and 2002.
- G stock: Also built by Alstom and entered service in 2008. They currently run on Lines 1 - Blue and 3 - Red.
- H stock: Streamlined CAF-built trains built in 2010 which operate exclusively on Line 3 - Red since 2014.
- I and J stock: Refurbished A stock trains which operate on Lines 1 - Blue and 2 - Green from 2011. They differ cosmetically as well as mechanically. I stock was rebuilt by Alstom and Siemens while J stock was rebuilt by Bombardier, Temoinsa, BTT and Tejofran.
- K stock: Refurbished C stock trains rebuilt by a consortium consisting of T’trans, MTTrens, MPE and Temoinsa. They operate on Line 3 - Red just like the original trains.
- L stock: D stock refurbished by Alstom and IESA and operates on Line 1 - Blue
- M stock: The Monorail stock built by Bombardier between 2013 and 2016 and operates on Line 15 - Silver.
- P stock: CAF-built trains from 2013 which run on Line 5 - Lilac alongside the former F stock.
- 400 series: Driverless trains built in 2009-2010 and 2016-2017 by Hyundai Rotem for Line 4 - Yellow

== Security ==
Metro's security agents have police powers and in case of need they will provide assistance. All police matters that occur within the system are directed to the police station of the subway system, Delegacia de Polícia do Metropolitano de São Paulo (DELPOM), located at Palmeiras-Barra Funda station.

== System lines ==
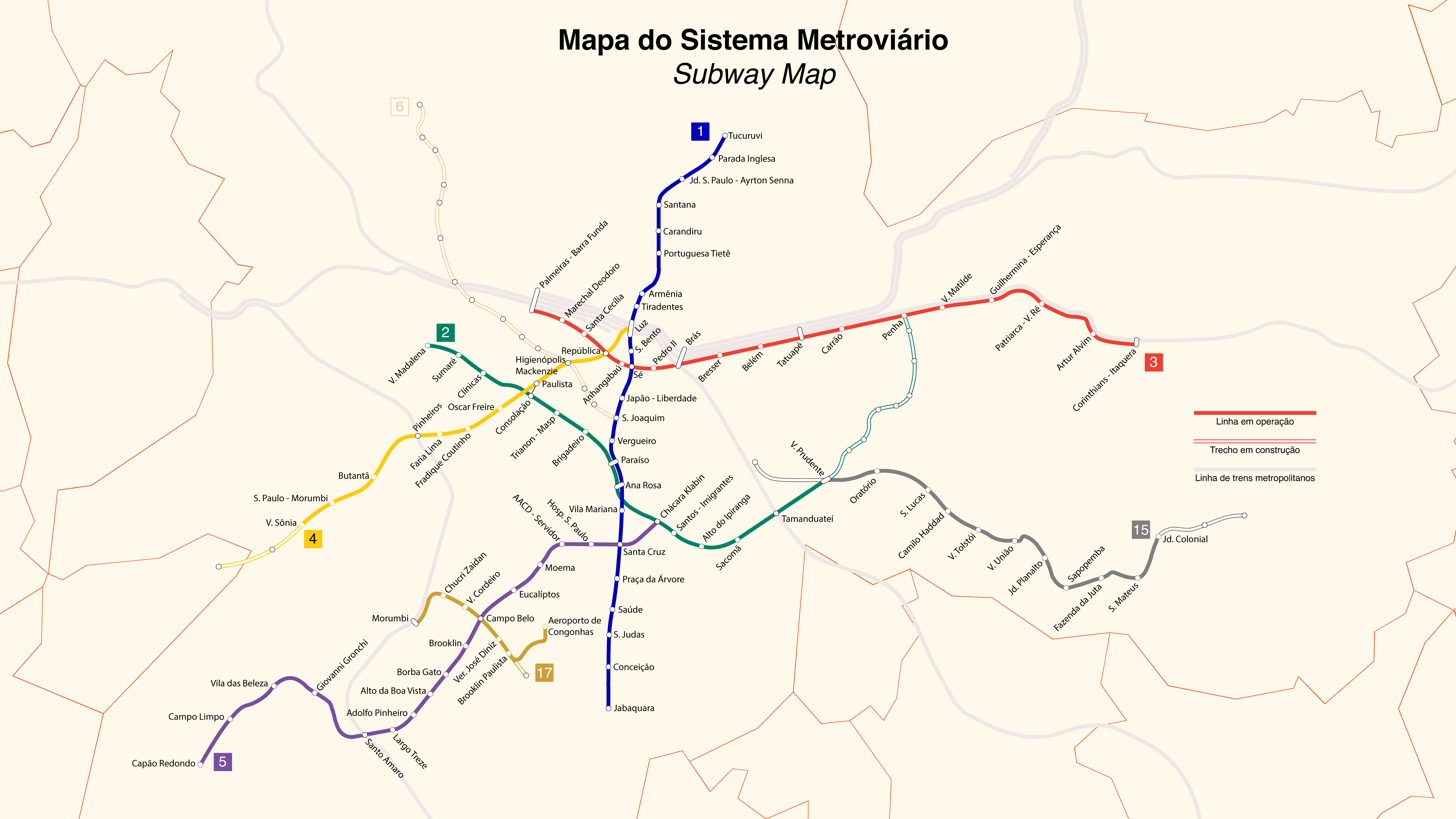
System Map - March 2026

Line	Color	Termini	Opened	Length	Stations	Duration of trip (min)	Hours of Operation
Line 1	Blue	Tucuruvi ↔ Jabaquara-Comitê Paralímpico Brasileiro	September 14, 1974	20.2 km (12.6 mi)	23	39	Daily (4:40 AM–0:32 AM)
Line 2	Green	Vila Madalena ↔ Vila Prudente	January 25, 1991	14.7 km (9.1 mi)	14	26	Daily (4:40 AM–0:32 AM)
Line 3	Red	Palmeiras–Barra Funda ↔ Corinthians-Itaquera	March 10, 1979	22.0 km (13.7 mi)	18	34	Daily (4:40 AM–0:32 AM)
Line 4	Yellow	Vila Sônia-Professora Elisabeth Tenreiro ↔ Luz	May 25, 2010	12.9 km (8.0 mi)	11	19	Daily (4:40 AM–0:32 AM)
Line 5	Lilac	Capão Redondo ↔ Chácara Klabin	October 20, 2002	19.9 km (12.4 mi)	17	35	Daily (4:40 AM–0:32 AM)
Line 6	Orange	João Paulo I ↔ Perdizes	July 2, 2026	5 km (3.1 mi)	6	19	Mon–Fri (10 AM–3 PM)
Line 15	Silver (Monorail)	Vila Prudente ↔ Jardim Colonial	August 30, 2014	14.7 km (9.1 mi)	11	21	Daily (4:40 AM–0:32 AM)
Line 17	Gold (Monorail)	Morumbi ↔ Aeroporto de Congonhas/Washington Luís	March 31, 2026	6.7 km (4.2 mi)	8	15	Mon–Sat (6 AM–10 PM)

=== Future developments ===
Several conventional metro and monorail lines are currently under construction or under project.

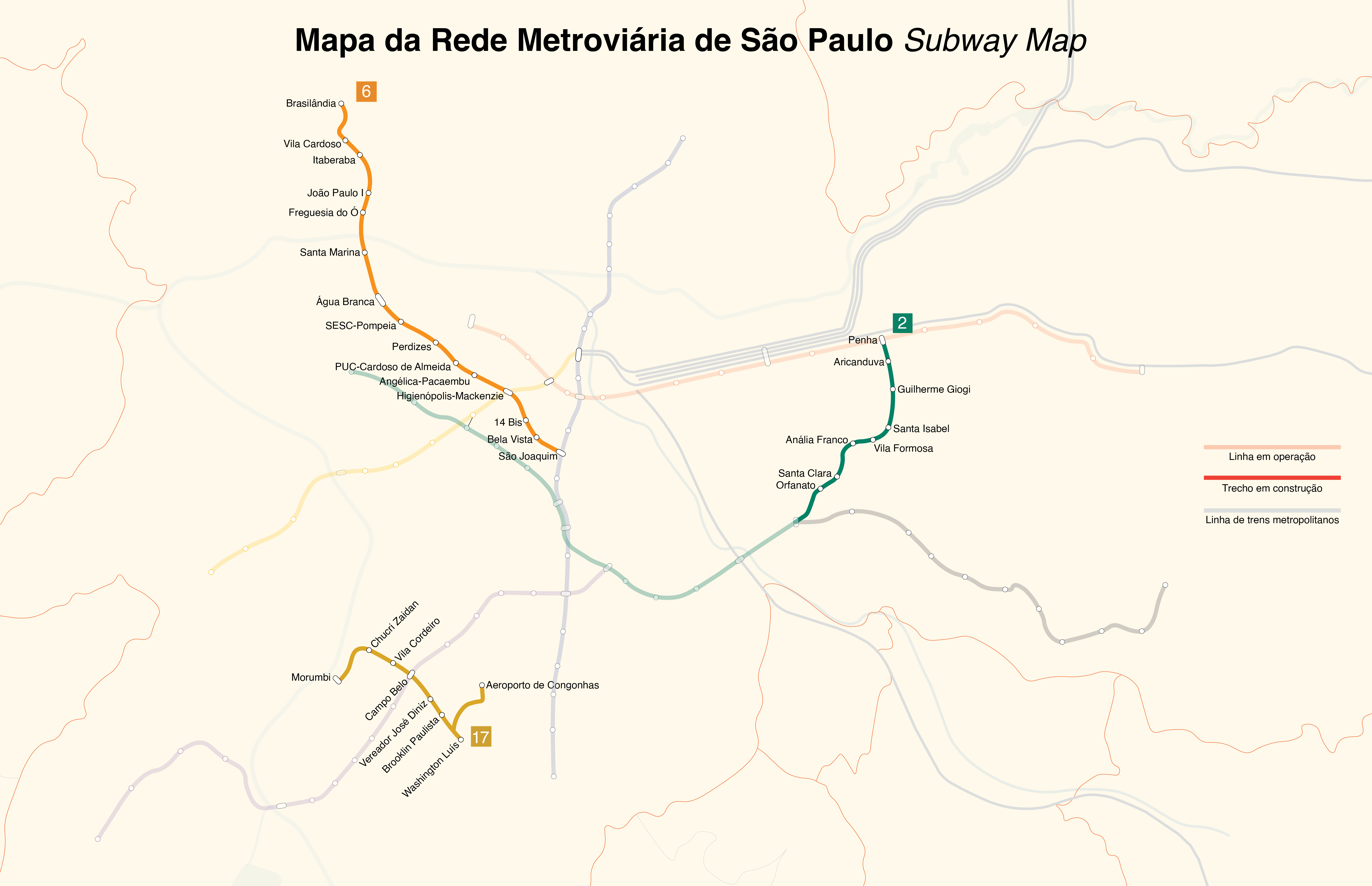
System Map - under construction

Under Construction
Line	Color	Termini	Length	Stations
Line 2	Green (Expansion)	Vila Prudente ↔ Dutra	13.8 km (8.6 mi)	13
Line 4	Yellow (Expansion)	Vila Sônia-Professora Elisabeth Tenreiro ↔ Taboão da Serra	3.3 km (2.1 mi)	2
Line 6	Orange	Brasilândia ↔ João Paulo I	8.4 km (5.2 mi)	3
Line 6	Orange	Perdizes ↔ São Joaquim	8.4 km (5.2 mi)	6
Line 15	Silver (Monorail) (Expansion)	Jardim Colonial ↔ Jacu-Pêssego	2.8 km (1.7 mi)	2
Line 15	Silver (Monorail) (Expansion)	Vila Prudente ↔ Ipiranga	1.8 km (1.1 mi)	1

Planned
Line	Color	Termini	Length	Stations
Line 2	Green (Expansion)	Vila Madalena ↔ Cerro Corá	1.3 km (0.81 mi)	1
Line 3	Red (Expansion)	Palmeiras-Barra Funda ↔ Água Branca	2.2 km (1.4 mi)	1
Line 5	Lilac (Expansion)	Capão Redondo ↔ Jardim Ângela	4.3 km (2.7 mi)	2
Line 6	Orange (Expansion)	Brasilândia ↔ Velha Campinas	2.8 km (1.7 mi)	2
Line 6	Orange (Expansion)	São Joaquim ↔ São Carlos	3.8 km (2.4 mi)	4
Line 15	Silver (Monorail) (Expansion)	Jacu-Pêssego ↔ Hospital Cidade Tiradentes	6.8 km (4.2 mi)	4
Line 16	Violet	Cardeal Arcoverde ↔ Cidade Tiradentes	31.9 km (19.8 mi)	25
Line 17	Gold (Monorail) (Expansion)	Morumbi ↔ São Paulo-Morumbi	6.9 km (4.3 mi)	5
Line 17	Gold (Monorail) (Expansion)	Washington Luís ↔ Jabaquara-Comitê Paralímpico Brasileiro	4.2 km (2.6 mi)	5
Line 19	Sky Blue	Anhangabaú ↔ Bosque Maia	17.6 km (10.9 mi)	15
Line 20	Pink	Santa Marina ↔ Santo André	31.1 km (19.3 mi)	24
Line 21	Wine	Diadema ↔ Parque do Carmo	23.3 km (14.5 mi)	21
Line 22	Brown	Cotia ↔ Sumaré	29 km (18 mi)	19
Line 23	Lime	Cohab Raposo ↔ Tatuapé	32.5 km (20.2 mi)	27

Cancelled
Line	Color	Termini	Length	Stations
Line 17	Gold (Monorail) (Expansion)	Aeroporto de Congonhas ↔ São Judas	3.8 km (2.4 mi)	2
Line 18	Bronze (Monorail)	Tamanduateí ↔ Estrada dos Alvarengas	20 km (12 mi)	19
Line 21	Gray	Pari ↔ Nordestina	21 km (13 mi)	12

== See also ==
- List of São Paulo Metro stations
- São Paulo Metropolitan Trains - São Paulo Metropolitan system
- Companhia do Metropolitano de São Paulo - São Paulo Metropolitan Company
- Companhia Paulista de Trens Metropolitanos - São Paulo Metropolitan Trains' Company
- Trens Intercidades - planned regional rail network centred on São Paulo
- Transport in São Paulo
- List of Latin American rail transit systems by ridership
- List of metro systems
- List of monorail systems
- List of São Paulo Metro yards
- Rapid transit in Brazil
