= Santo Amaro (district of São Paulo) =

District of São Paulo, Brazil

Coordinates: 23.6538°S 46.7068°W

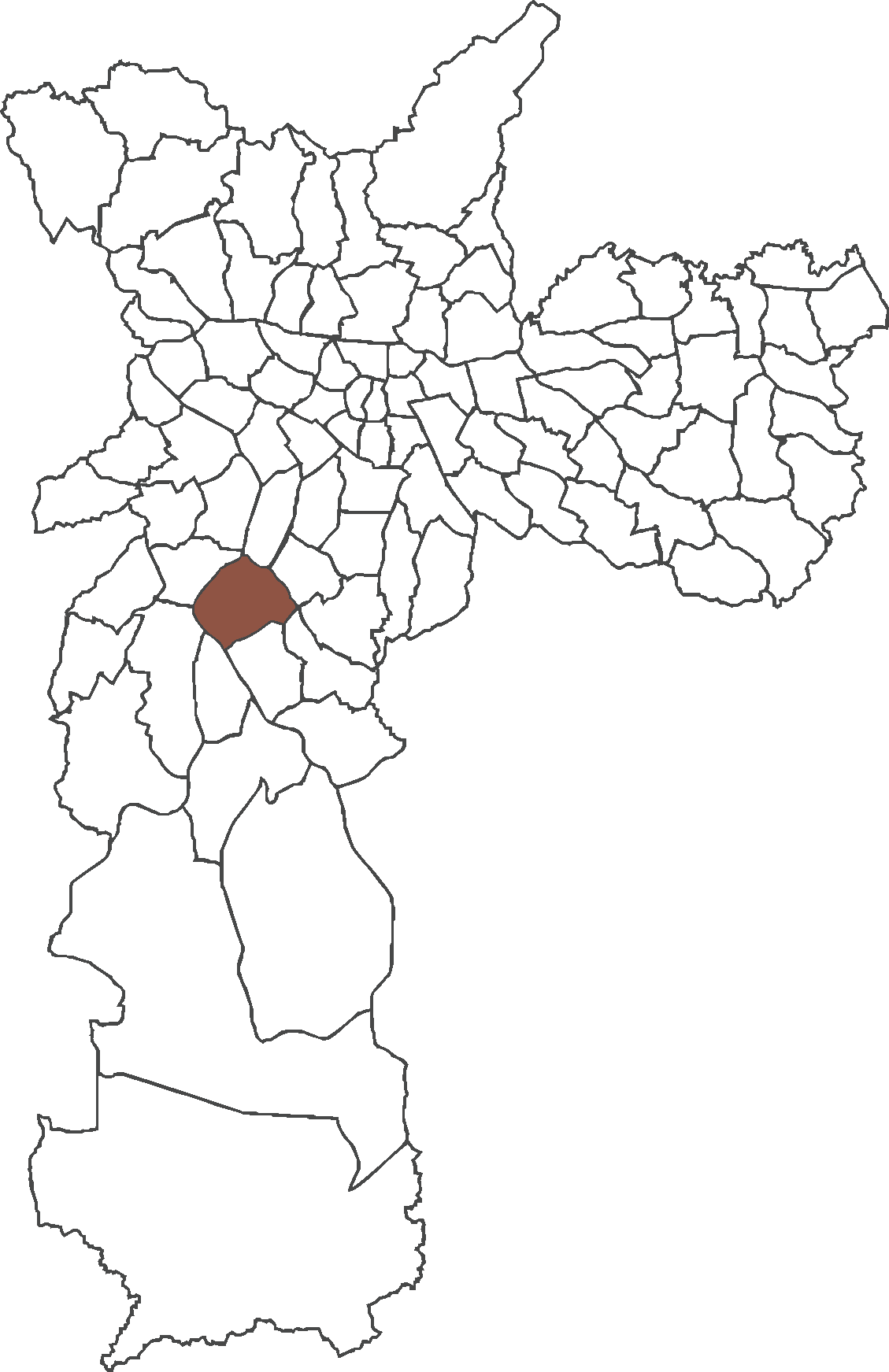
- Location in the city of São Paulo

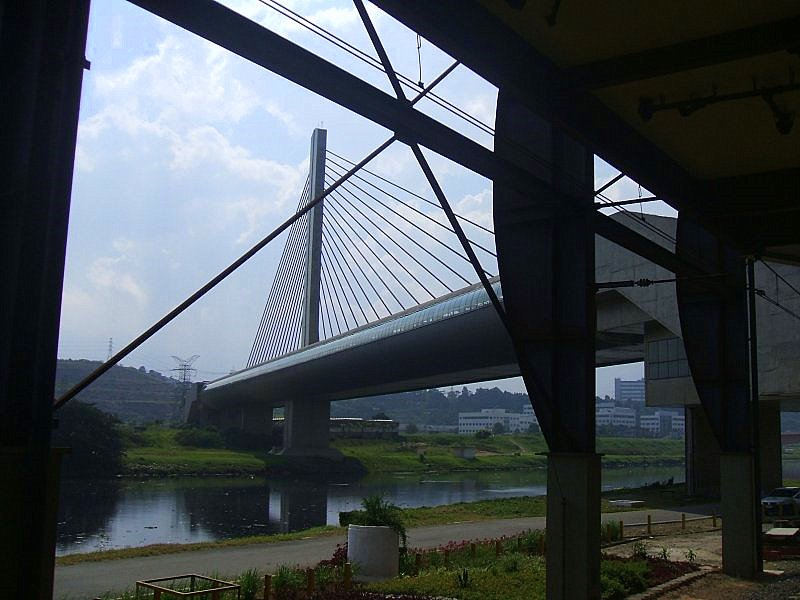
- Country: Brazil
- State: São Paulo
- Municipality: São Paulo
- Subprefecture: Santo Amaro

Area
  - Total: 16.04 km^{2} (6.19 sq mi)

Population (2022)
  - Total: 85,349
  - Density: 5,321/km^{2} (13,780/sq mi)
- HDI: 0.943 – high
- Website: Subprefecture of Santo Amaro

Santo Amaro is a district located within the subprefecture of the same name in the southern area of the city of São Paulo, Brazil. It was formerly a separate municipality from 1832 until 1935, when it was incorporated into the city of São Paulo.

The district spans an area of 16.04 km² (6.19 sq mi), with a population of 85,349 recorded by the 2022 Brazilian census. Its most central part is the Largo 13 de Maio, where the Santo Amaro Cathedral and the Marco Zero (kilometre zero) of the old city of Santo Amaro are located.

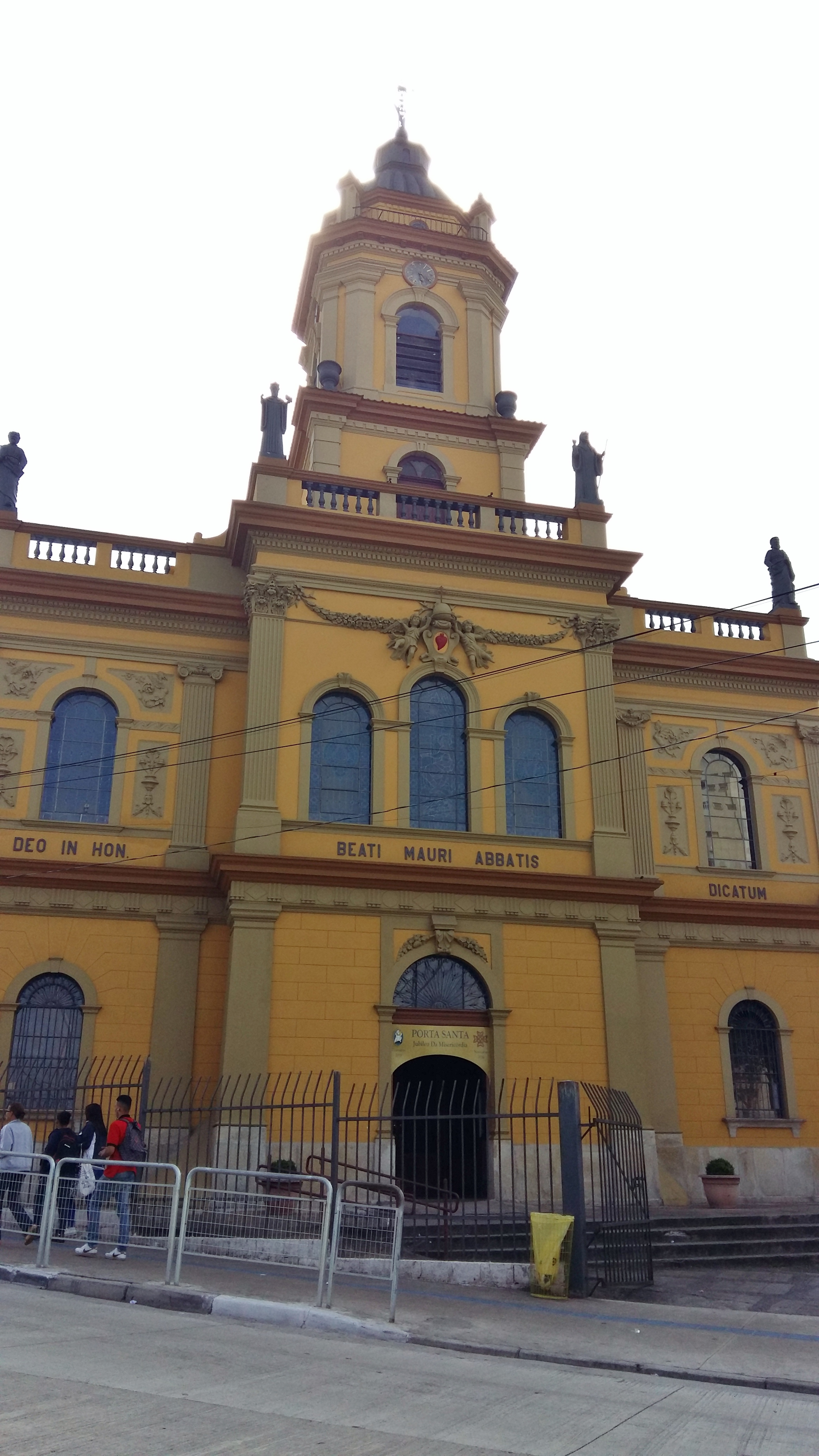
Santo Amaro Cathedral, seat of the Roman Catholic Diocese of Santo Amaro

A German international school, Colégio Humboldt São Paulo (formerly named Ginásio Humboldt), is also located in Santo Amaro.

== See also ==
- Roman Catholic Diocese of Santo Amaro
