= Campo Belo (district of São Paulo) =

District of São Paulo, Brazil

Coordinates: 23.6217°S 46.6719°W

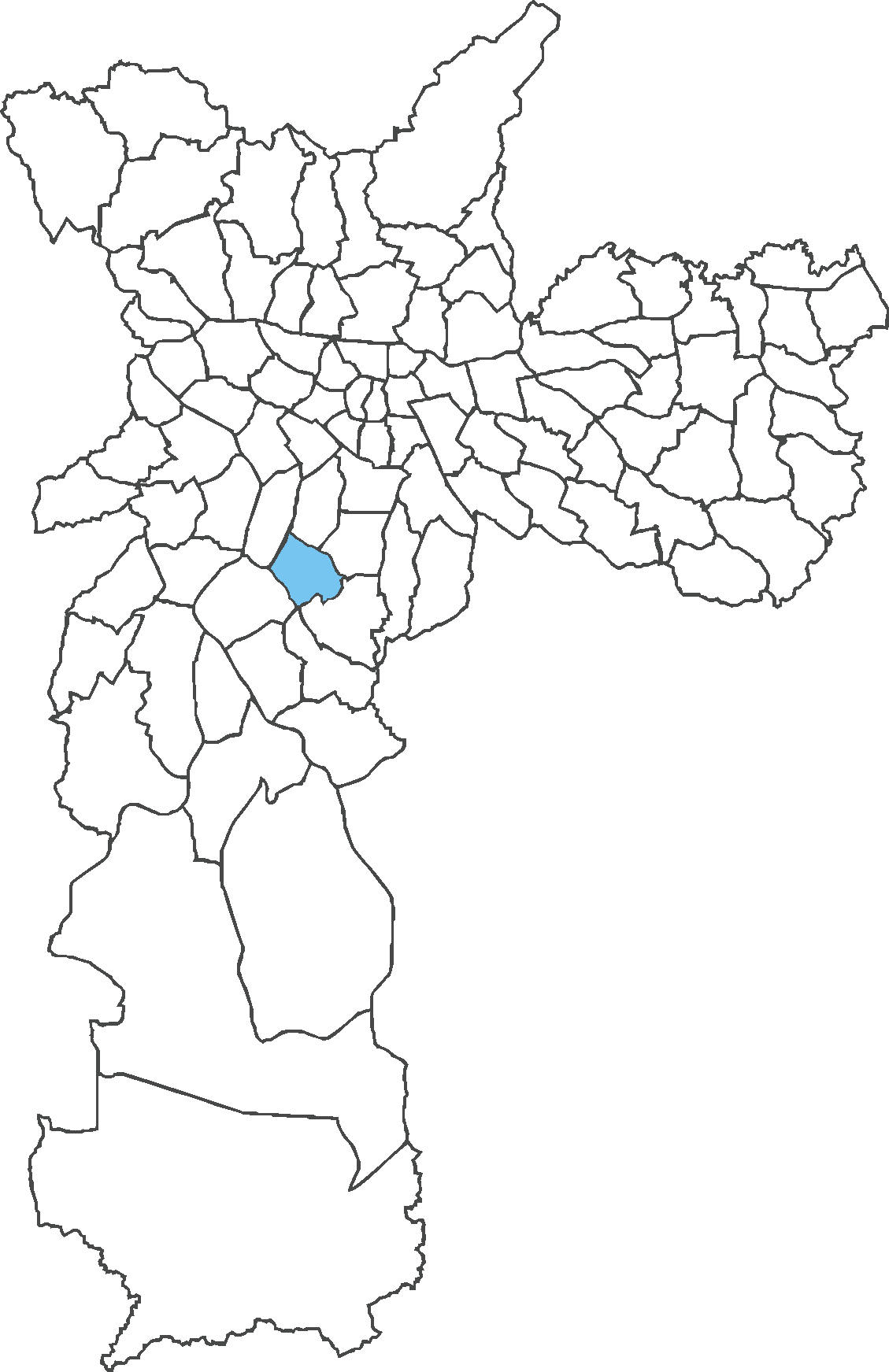
- District of the city of São Paulo

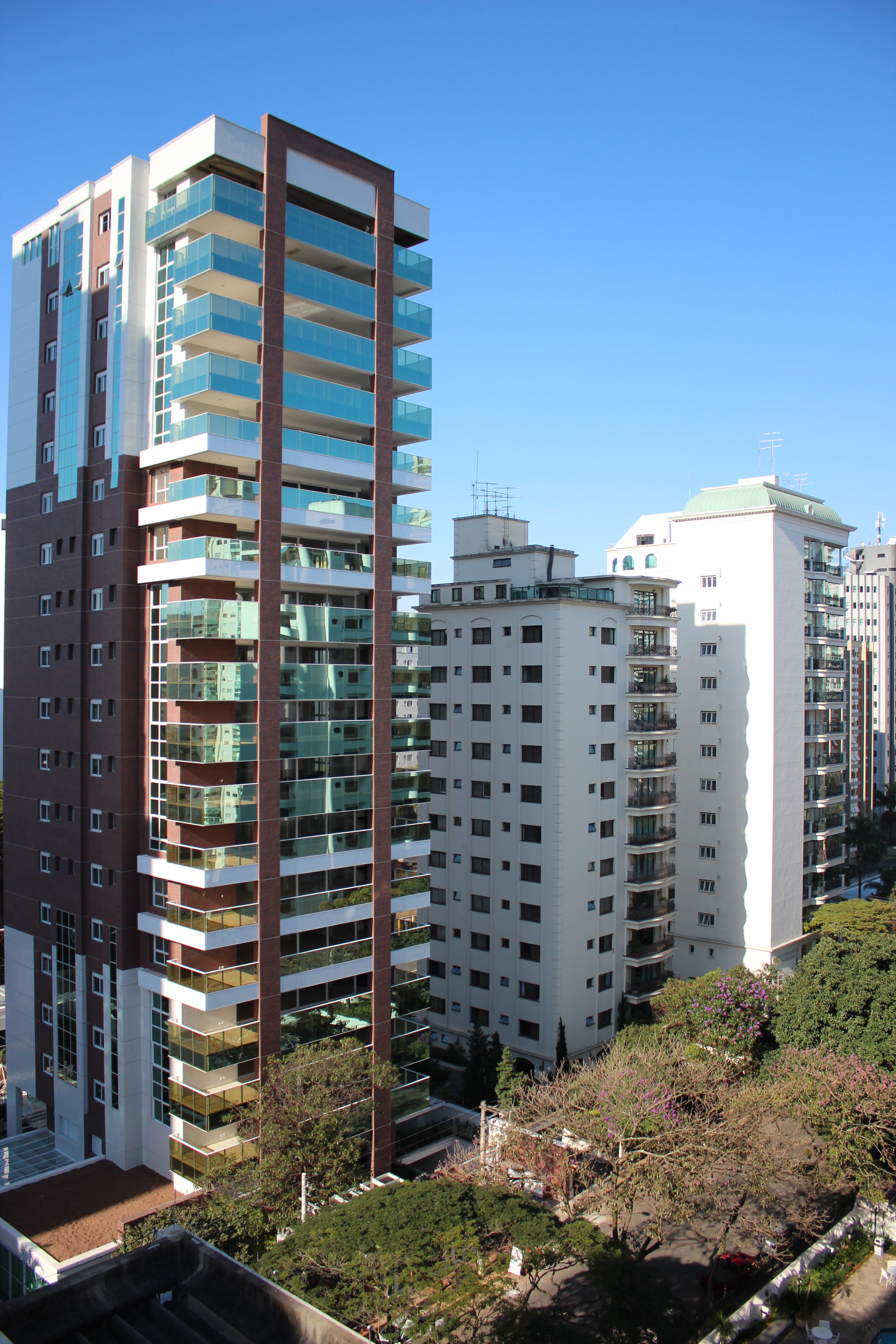
- Country: Brazil
- State: São Paulo
- Municipality: São Paulo
- Subprefecture: Santo Amaro

Area
  - Total: 8.80 km^{2} (3.40 sq mi)

Population (2022)
  - Total: 71,058
  - Density: 4,472/km^{2} (11,580/sq mi)
- Website: Subprefecture of Santo Amaro

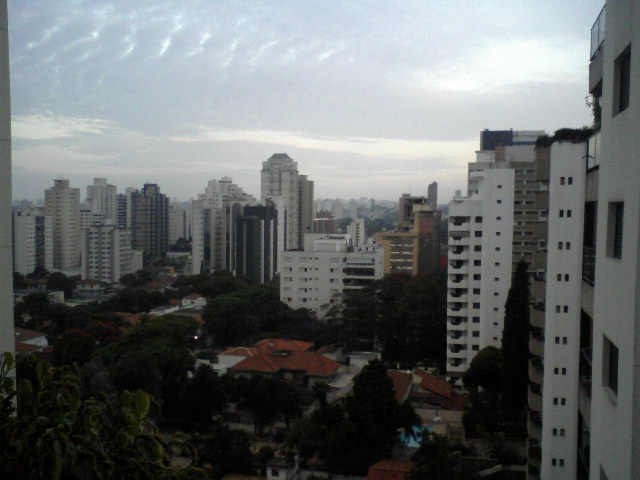
Sao Paulo - Campo Belo

Campo Belo is one of 96 districts in the city of São Paulo, Brazil.

Campo Belo is a district located in the southern region of the municipality of São Paulo, on the northern border of the former municipality of Santo Amaro. In recent years, it has become an area of large middle and upper-middle class buildings.

Campo Belo has a population of 71,058 according to the 2022 census.

== See also ==
- Roman Catholic Diocese of Santo Amaro
