= Santo Amaro (São Paulo Metro) =

São Paulo Metro station

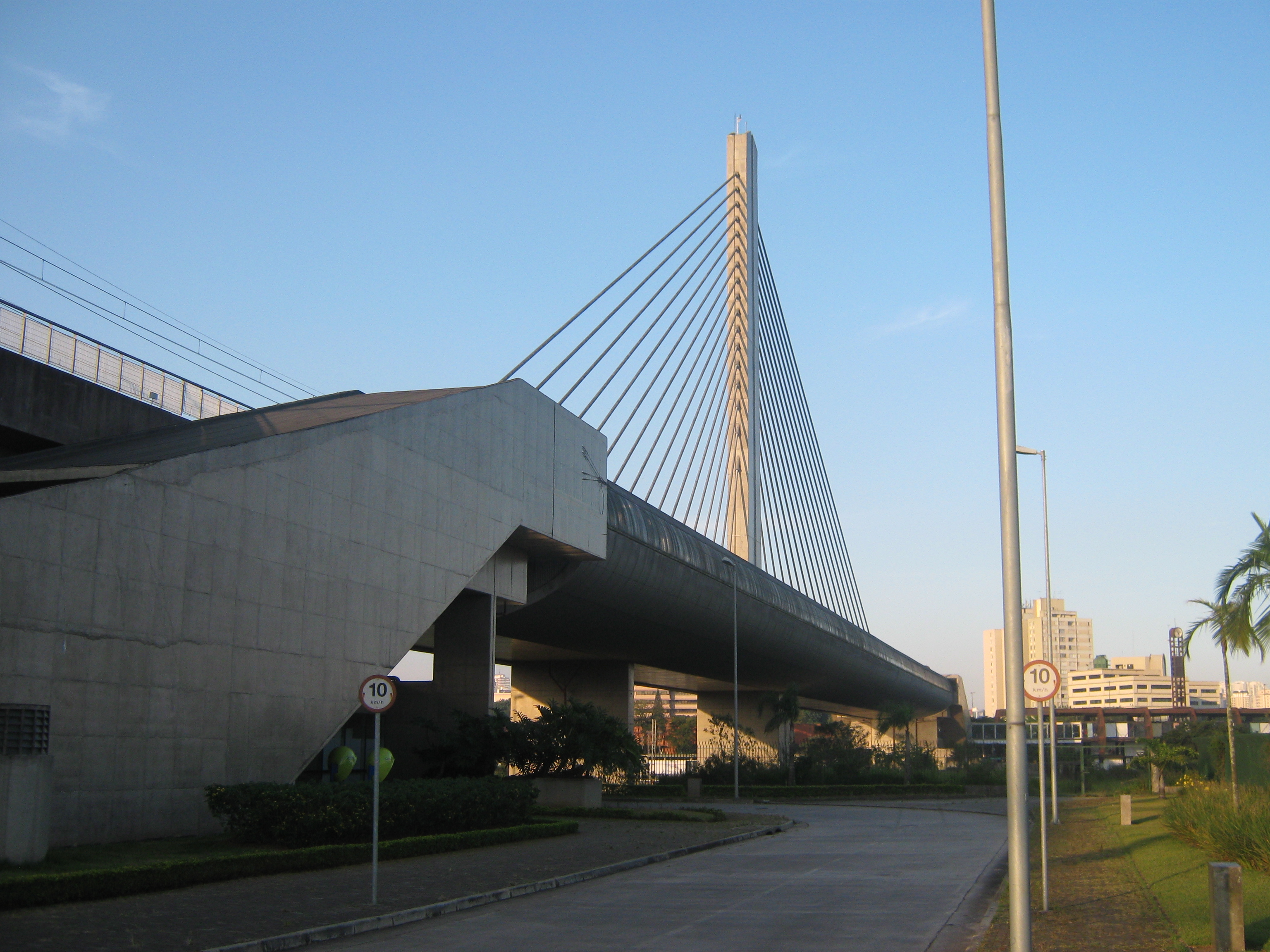
- Santo Amaro Station

General information
- Location: Av. Guido Caloi, 2221; São Paulo; Brazil
- Coordinates: 23°39′20″S 46°43′14″W
- Owner: Government of the State of São Paulo
- Operator: Companhia do Metropolitano de São Paulo (2002–2018); ViaMobilidade (2018–present)
- Platforms: Side platforms
- Connections: Guido Caloi Bus Terminal

Construction
- Structure type: Elevated
- Accessible: y
- Architect: Luiz Carlos Esteves

Other information
- Station code: STA

History
- Opened: October 20, 2002

Services
Preceding station	São Paulo Metro	Following station
Giovanni Gronchi towards Capão Redondo	Line 5	Largo Treze towards Chácara Klabin

Out-of-system interchange
Preceding station	São Paulo Metropolitan Trains	Following station
João Dias towards Osasco	Line 9 transfer at Santo Amaro	Socorro towards Varginha
Track layout
Location

Santo Amaro is a metro station on Line 5 (Lilac) of the São Paulo Metro in the Santo Amaro district of São Paulo, Brazil.

== CPTM transfer ==
Passengers may transfer from here to Line 9 (Emerald) of the ViaMobilidade commuter train.

== SPTrans lines ==
The following SPTrans bus lines can be accessed. Passengers may use a Bilhete Único card for transfer:

Line #	Destination
6008/10	Jardim Planalto
7004/10	Term. Rod. Jd. Jacira
709P/10	Term. Pinheiros

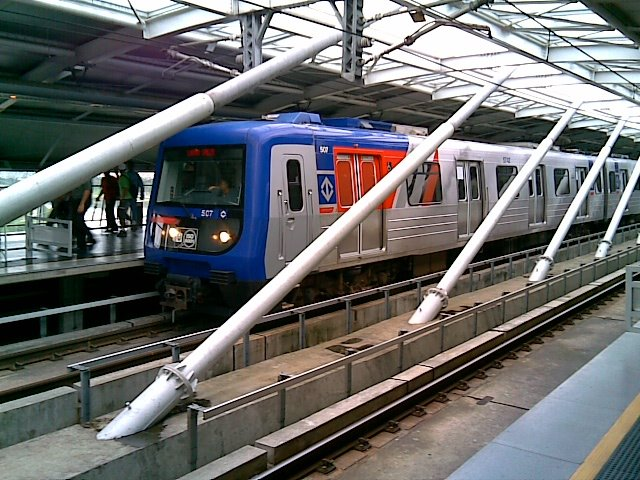
Train at Santo Amaro
