= Berrini (CPTM) =

Railway station in São Paulo, Brazil

Coordinates: 23.6047°S 46.6968°W

Berrini–Casas Bahia
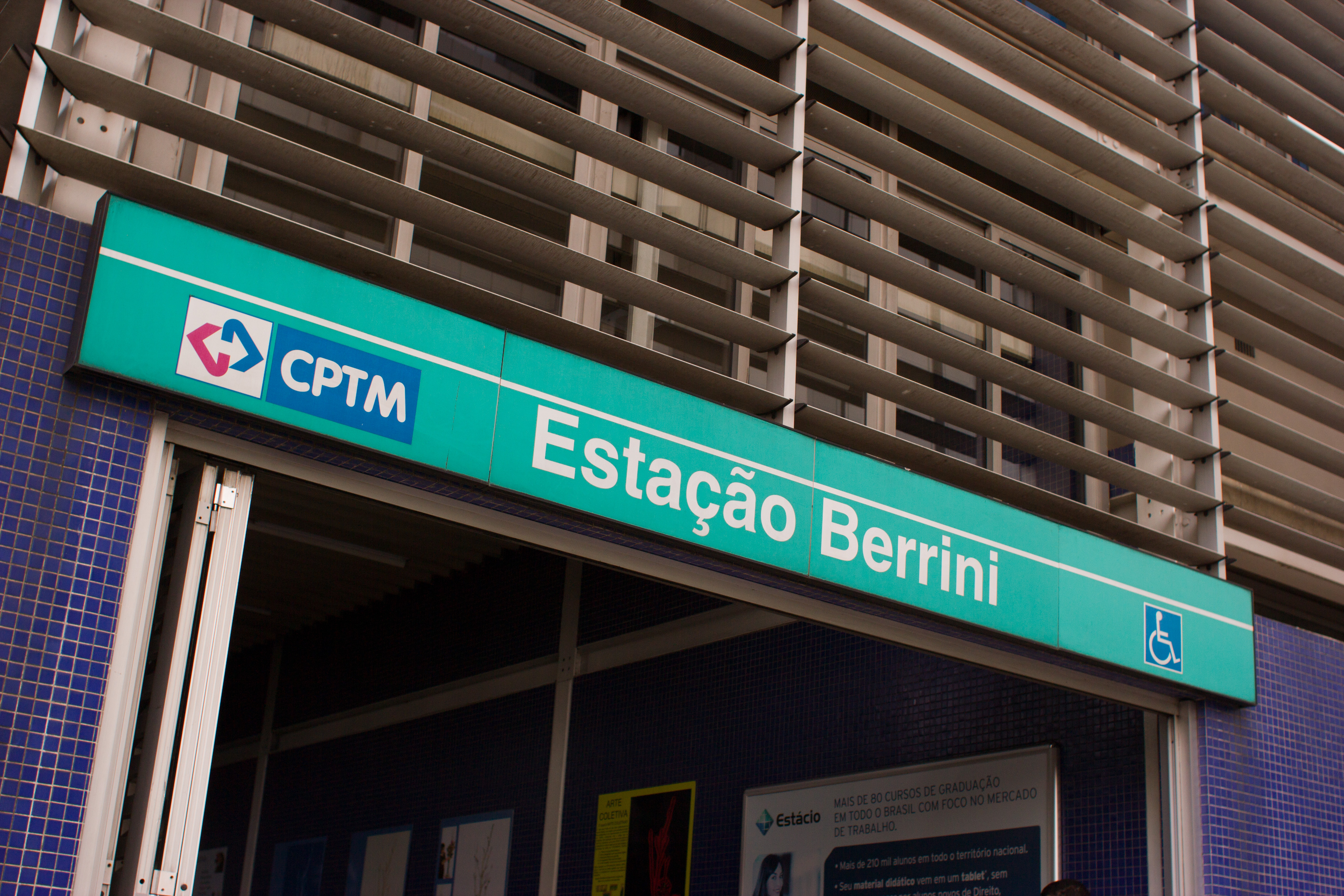

General information
- Location: R. Guilherme Barbosa de Melo × R. Joel Carlos Borges; Itaim Bibi; Brazil
- Owner: Government of the State of São Paulo
- Operator: ViaMobilidade Linhas 8 e 9 (Motiva)
- Platforms: Island platform
- Connections: Diadema–Morumbi Metropolitan Corridor

Construction
- Structure type: At-grade
- Architect: Luiz Carlos Esteves

Other information
- Station code: BRR

History
- Opened: 14 June 2000; 26 years ago

Services
Preceding station	São Paulo Metropolitan Trains	Following station
Vila Olímpia towards Osasco	Line 9	Morumbi towards Varginha
Track layout
Location

Berrini, also known as Berrini–Casas Bahia for sponsorship reasons, is a train station on ViaMobilidade Linhas 8 e 9 Line 9-Emerald, located in the district of Itaim Bibi in São Paulo.

== History ==
The station was built by CPTM, during the "South Line Dinamization" project, and opened on 14 June 2000, located next to Avenida Engenheiro Luís Carlos Berrini, a tribute to engineer Luís Carlos Berrini, who named the station.
