= Morumbi (CPTM) =

Railway station in São Paulo, Brazil

Morumbi–Claro
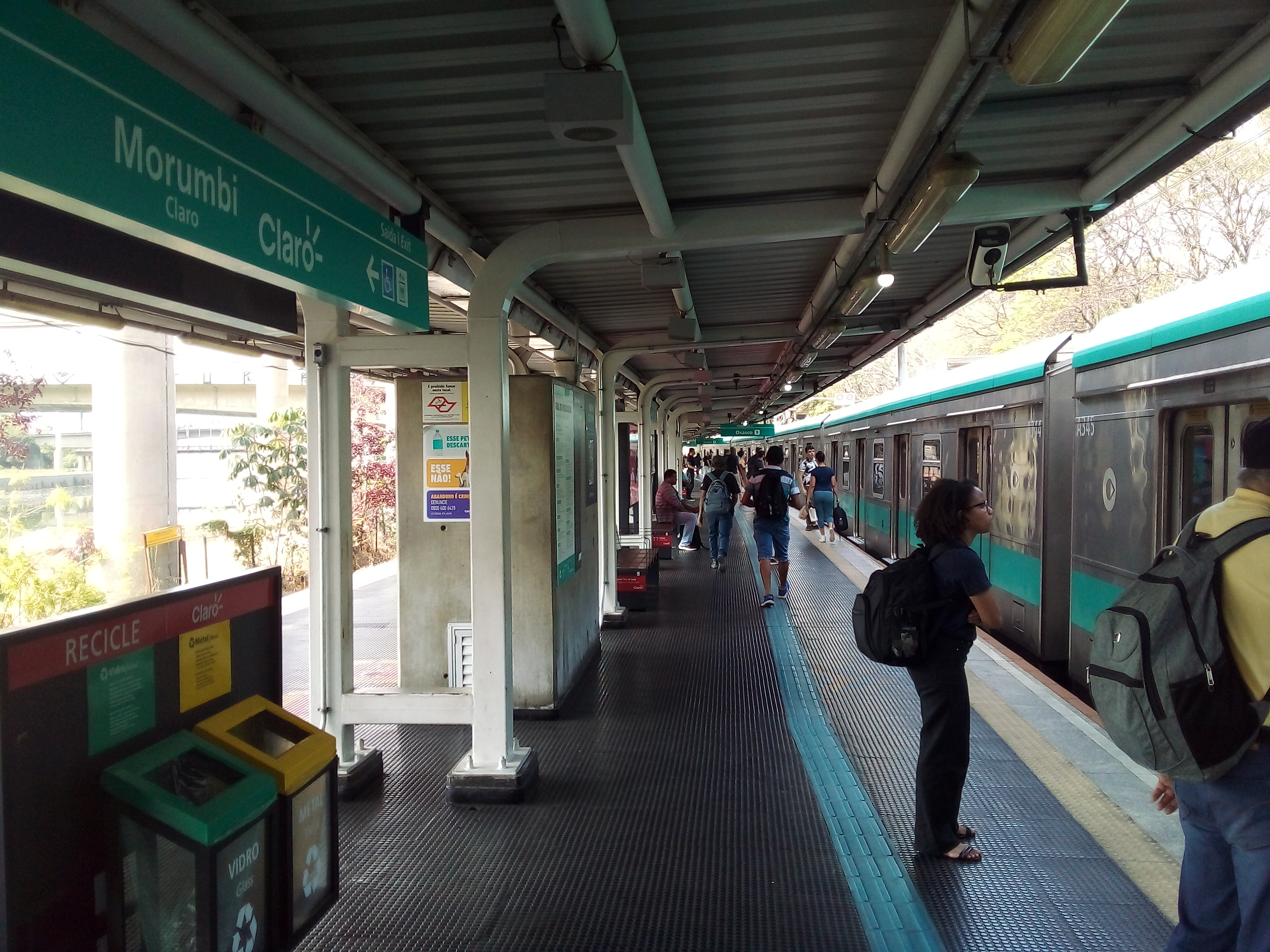
- Train stopping at the station.

General information
- Location: Av. das Nações Unidas, 14171; Santo Amaro; Brazil
- Coordinates: 23°36′50″S 46°41′43″W
- Owner: Government of the State of São Paulo
- Operator: ViaMobilidade Linhas 8 e 9 (Motiva)
- Platforms: Island platforms
- Connections: Diadema–Morumbi Metropolitan Corridor

Construction
- Structure type: At-grade
- Accessible: Yes
- Architect: Luiz Carlos Esteves

History
- Opened: January 25, 1957; 69 years ago
- Rebuilt: June 30, 2000; 26 years ago

Services
Preceding station	São Paulo Metropolitan Trains	Following station
Berrini towards Osasco	Line 9	Granja Julieta towards Varginha

Out-of-system interchange
Preceding station	São Paulo Metro	Following station
Terminus	Line 17 transfer at Morumbi	Chucri Zaidan towards Aeroporto de Congonhas or Washington Luís
Track layout
Location

Morumbi, also known as Morumbi–Claro for sponsorship reasons, is a train station on ViaMobilidade Linhas 8 e 9 Line 9-Emerald, located in the limits of district of Santo Amaro. It is connected to Motiva Linhas 5 e 17 Line 17-Gold, opened in March 2026.

== History ==
Morumbi station was built and opened by Estrada de Ferro Sorocabana (along with Jurubatuba branch), on January 25, 1957, and demolished in the 1970s by FEPASA during the remodeling of commuter trains. Because of the lack of funds, its reconstruction project was paralyzed during all the 1980s, being reestablished only in 1994, when the architectural project was hired from architect Luiz Carlos Esteves. In 1992, CPTM launched the project South Dinamization, which wanted to conclude the construction of the remaining stations of the line.

== Toponymy ==
The word "Morumbi" is an indigenous term of Tupi origin that can mean "green fly" (moru: fly, and mbi: green). The ethnologist Eduardo Navarro defends that "Morumbi" has other meanings, as from the tupi maromby, which meaning is "river of the big fishes" (maromba: "big fish"; y: "river"), or marumbi, term of Portuguese language that means "lagoon full of taboas".
