= Santo Amaro (CPTM) =

Railway station in São Paulo, Brazil

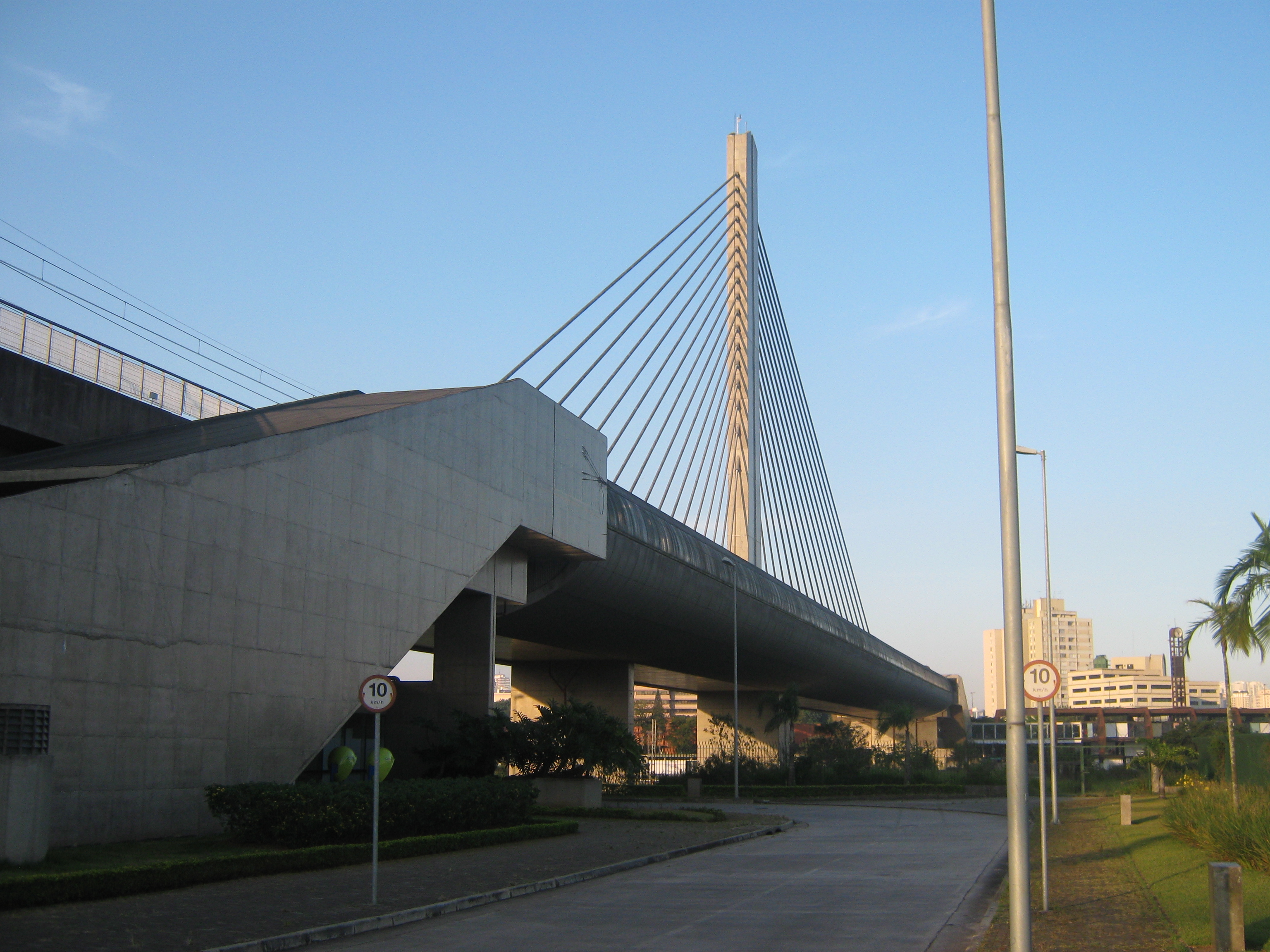
- Santo Amaro Station

General information
- Location: Av. das Nações Unidas, s/n
- Coordinates: 23°39′20″S 46°43′14″W
- Owner: Government of the State of São Paulo
- Operator: ViaMobilidade Linhas 8 e 9 (Motiva)
- Platforms: Island platform
- Connections: Guido Caloi Bus Terminal

Construction
- Structure type: At-grade
- Accessible: y
- Architect: João Walter Toscano

Other information
- Station code: SAM

History
- Opened: January 26, 1986; 40 years ago
- Former names: Largo Treze

Services
Preceding station	São Paulo Metropolitan Trains	Following station
João Dias towards Osasco	Line 9	Socorro towards Varginha
Out-of-system interchange
Preceding station	São Paulo Metro	Following station
Giovanni Gronchi towards Capão Redondo	Line 5 transfer at Santo Amaro	Largo Treze towards Chácara Klabin
Track layout
Location

Santo Amaro is a train station on ViaMobilidade Linhas 8 e 9 Line 9-Emerald in the Santo Amaro district of São Paulo, Brazil.

== Characteristics ==
Santo Amaro station, which initial name was Largo Treze, was opened on January 26, 1986 by FEPASA. It is part of CPTM Line 9-Emerald.

The architectonical project was chosen to be integrated into the collection of the Modern Art Museum of Centre Georges Pompidou in Paris, France. Designed by João Walter Toscano, one of the pioneers of the use of steel in civil construction in Brazil, the station was opened in 1986 and stands out for the transparency and the use of natural light, in a reinterpretation of traditional elements of the railway, like the clock tower that refers to 19th century stations.

In that time, the line currently known as CPTM Line 9-Emerald, of which the station is part of, had Pinheiros station as terminus, and the opening of Largo Treze station was considered by Veja São Paulo magazine "a giant step in the enhancement of this line and the daily transportation of a part of the city population". The same publishing classified the station architecture, of steel and reinforced concrete, as "pretty and dashing". The location of the station is at 2 kilometers south from the old Santo Amaro station, demolished in the second half of the 1970s.
