= Granja Julieta (CPTM) =

Railway station in São Paulo, Brazil

Coordinates: 23.6276°S 46.7120°W

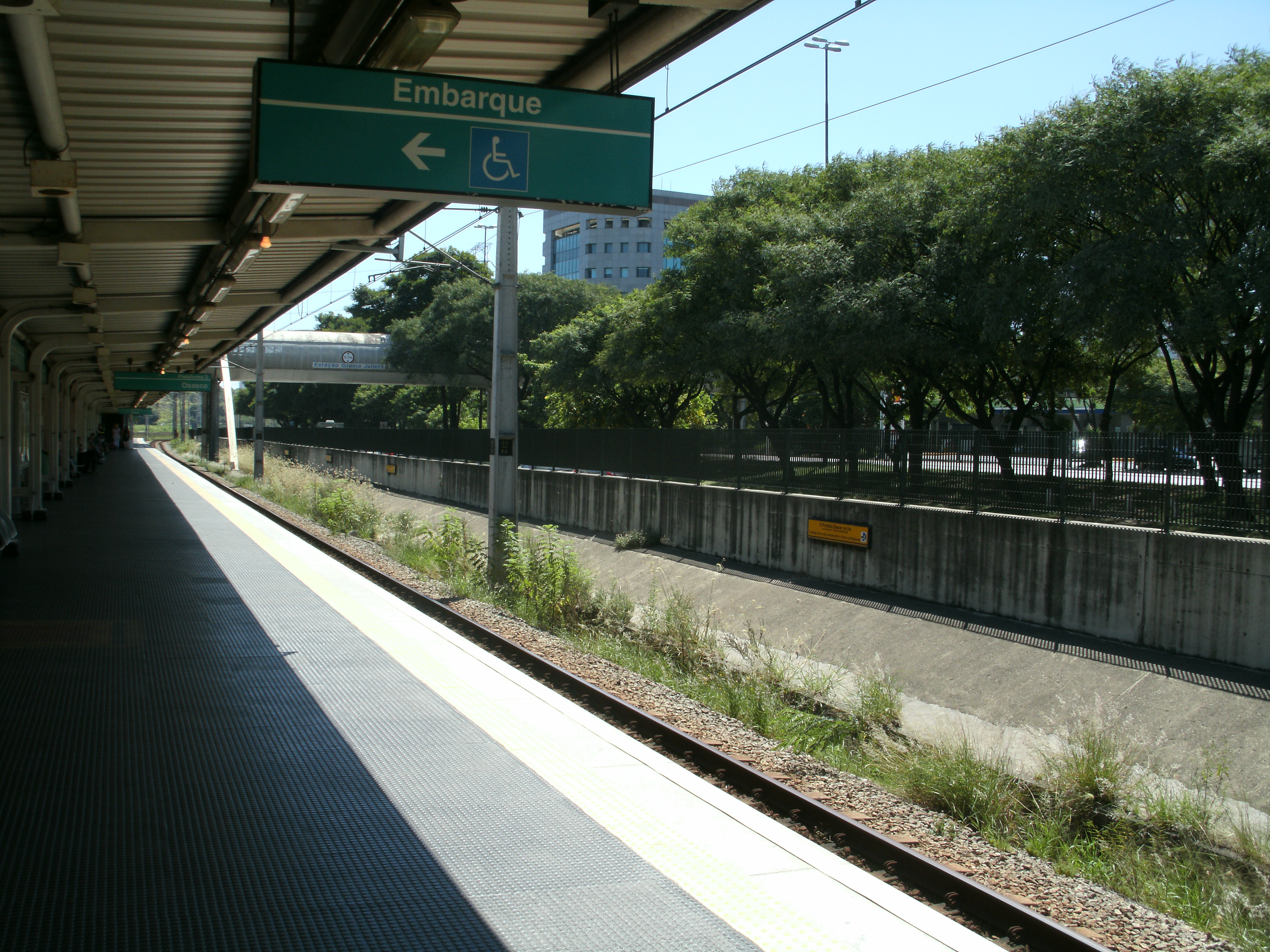

General information
- Location: R. Alexandre Dumas, 4403; Santo Amaro; Brazil
- Owner: Government of the State of São Paulo
- Operator: ViaMobilidade Linhas 8 e 9 (Motiva)
- Platforms: Island platform

Construction
- Structure type: At-grade
- Architect: Luiz Carlos Esteves

Other information
- Station code: GJT

History
- Opened: 4 May 2000; 26 years ago

Services
Preceding station	São Paulo Metropolitan Trains	Following station
Morumbi towards Osasco	Line 9	João Dias towards Varginha
Track layout
Location

Granja Julieta is a train station on ViaMobilidade Linhas 8 e 9 Line 9-Emerald, located in Chácara Santo Antônio neighbourhood, district of Santo Amaro in São Paulo, Brazil.

== History ==
Granja Julieta is a station opened on 4 May 2000, and integrated Jurubatuba Branch, in the old Sorocaba Railway, built between 1952 and 1957. In 2001, the average passenger circulation was of 3,200 people.

== Characteristics ==
The station has advanced architectural drawing, with project based in modules, catwalk over Via Professor SImão Faiguenboim, boarding mezzanine, elevators for people with disabilities, access ramp, rubber floor, cover, and maps with street and location of points of interest.
