= Jurubatuba (CPTM) =

Railway station in São Paulo, Brazil

Jurubatuba–Senac
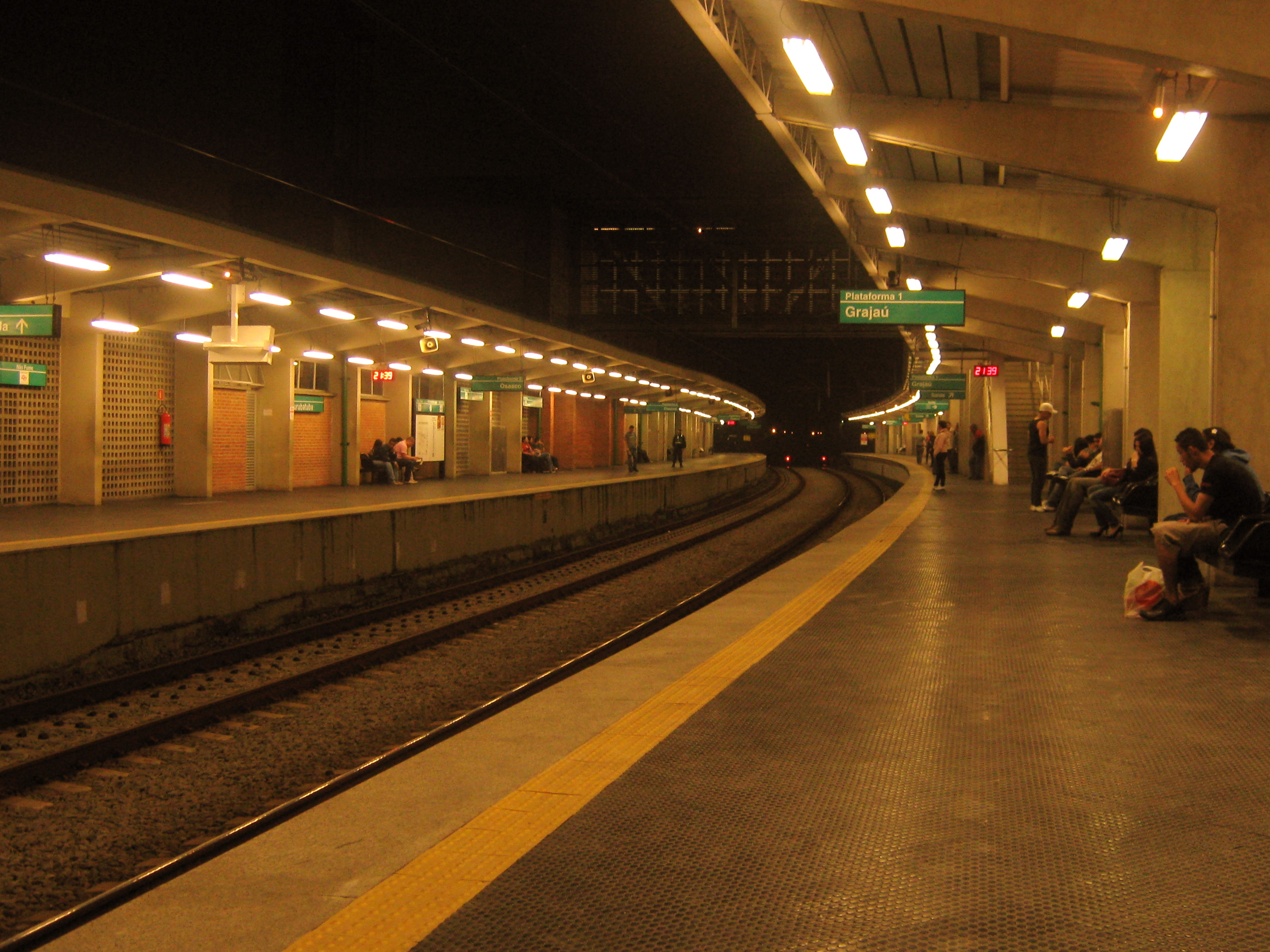

General information
- Location: Av. Octales M. Ferreira, 391; Campo Grande; Brazil
- Coordinates: 23.677425°S 46.7022°W
- Owner: Government of the State of São Paulo
- Operator: ViaMobilidade Linhas 8 e 9 (Motiva)
- Platforms: Side platforms

Construction
- Structure type: At-grade
- Architect: João Toscano (1985)

Other information
- Station code: JUR

History
- Opened: 25 January 1957; 69 years ago
- Rebuilt: 14 March 1987; 39 years ago (FEPASA); 17 October 2007; 18 years ago (CPTM)

Services
| Preceding station | São Paulo Metropolitan Trains | Following station |
|---|---|---|
| Socorro towards Osasco | Line 9 | Autódromo towards Varginha |
Track layout
Location

Jurubatuba, also known as Jurubatuba–Senac for sponsorship reasons, is a train station on Line 9-Emerald, operated by ViaMobilidade. It's located in the district of Campo Grande, in South Zone of São Paulo.

== History ==
Jurubatuba station was opened by Sorocaba Railway (EFS) on 25 January 1957, along with Jurubatuba Branch.

In the 1970s, Fepasa incorporated EFS and started reforms in the metropolitan train system, which included Jurubatuba station, reopened on 14 March 1987. CPTM, created in 1992, incorporated the metropolitan train lines from FEPASA in 1996. In the 2000s, the station was modernized and remodeled and was reopened on 17 October 2007.
