= Pinheiros (São Paulo Metro) =

São Paulo Metro station

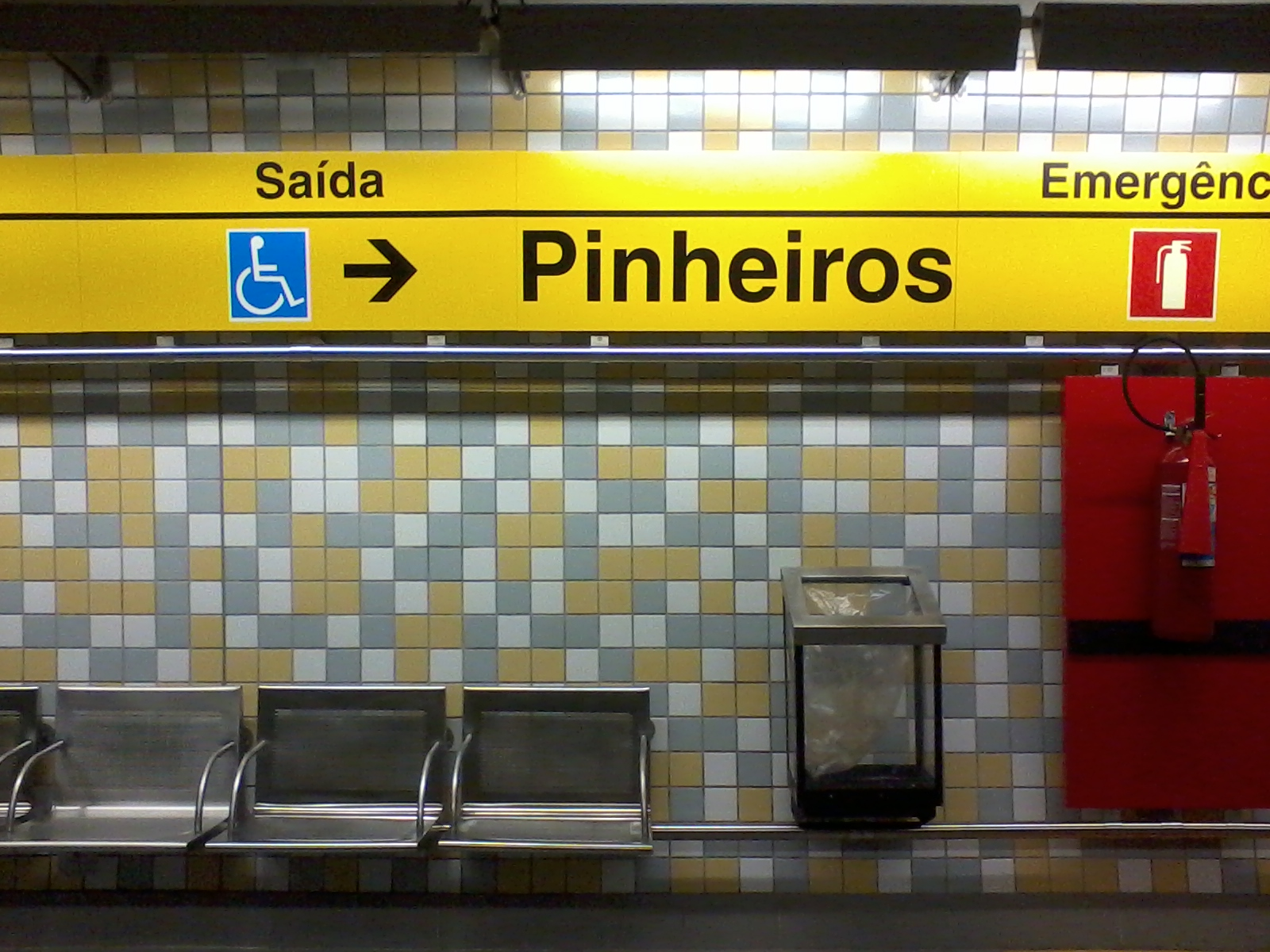
- Platform of Pinheiros station (Line 4)

General information
- Location: São Paulo; Brazil
- Coordinates: 23.536111°S 46.634722°W
- Owner: Government of the State of São Paulo
- Operator: Motiva Linha 4
- Platforms: Side platforms
- Connections: Pinheiros Bus Terminal

Construction
- Structure type: Underground
- Accessible: y

Other information
- Station code: PIN

History
- Opened: 16 May 2011

Passengers
- 87,170/business day

Services
Preceding station	São Paulo Metro	Following station
Butantã towards Vila Sônia-Professora Elisabeth Tenreiro	Line 4	Faria Lima towards Luz

Out-of-system interchange
Preceding station	São Paulo Metropolitan Trains	Following station
Cidade Universitária towards Osasco	Line 9 transfer at Pinheiros	Hebraica-Rebouças towards Varginha
Track layout
Line 4 track layout
Location

Pinheiros is a metro station on Line 4-Yellow of the Brazilian São Paulo Metro operated by Motiva Linha 4. Already completed, passengers may transfer without any fee to Line 9-Emerald of ViaMobilidade.

== History ==
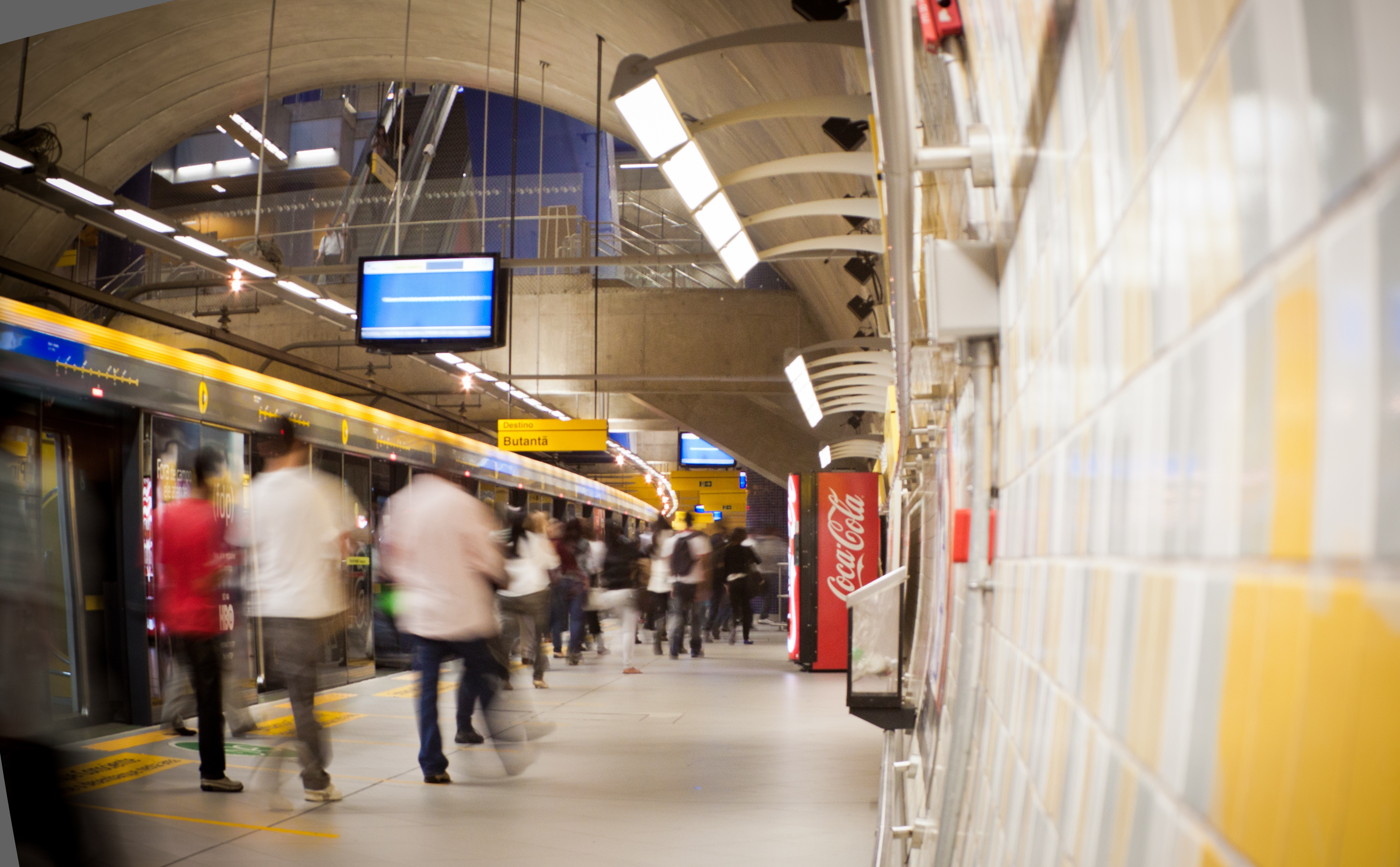
Platform of the station, 2012

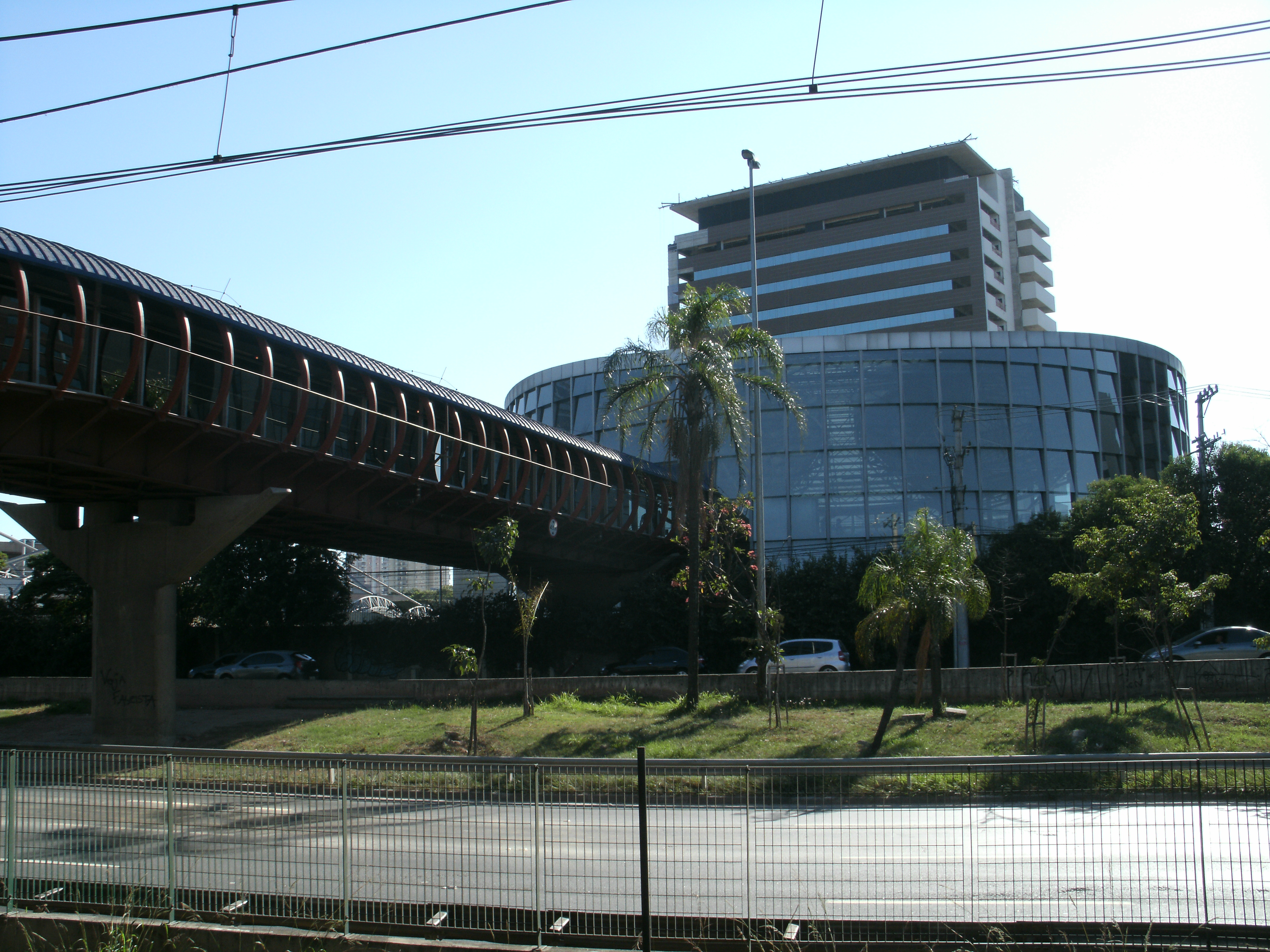
Pinheiros station building of Lines 4 and 9 and access catwalk to the CPTM Line 9 station

Projected by the São Paulo Metro since the 1970s, the subway station Pinheiros was under construction from September 2004 until May 2011. It is the 62nd São Paulo Metro station. The Metro planned that almost 100,000 passengers were supposed to make the connection when the station would be concluded, what scheduled until mid-2011, according to the state government, which was accomplished with the opening of the station, on 16 May 2011. The station is located next to the Pinheiros Urban Bus Terminal.

During the construction work of the station, in January 2007, it was registered the most serious accident in the history of the São Paulo subway. Great part of the access tunnel of the construction of the station fell apart, opening a crater of more than 80 metres (260 ft) of diameter. Seven people died in the accident. Many condemned houses and many cars were swollen by the crater, including a micro-bus that was in the region during the accident.

After it, the construction was kept on hold until May 2008. During this time, the opening schedule, originally estimated to the end of 2008, was delayed to 2011 or 2012. On 9 May 2008, it was announced that the official schedule would again be the beginning of 2010. This scheduling was delayed many times, and the Metro started to announce the conclusion as "until the end of 2010", estimate given by Governor Alberto Goldman in the second semester of 2010, besides they didn't announce dates as official. To accomplish this term, there was a change in the connection project between the CPTM and Metro stations, that, from an underground passage, it was substituted by an improvised catwalk. According to Metro employees heard by the newspaper Folha de S. Paulo in October 2010, talking about the ground instability occurred after the 2007 accident and had influence in the change. Metro denies any relation between the happening and the decision and cites the increase of the CPTM Line 9-Emerald demand, which came from 115,000 passengers per day in 2009 to 279,000 in 2010, what would obligate CPTM to operate in a restrict way in that track if there was an underground passage.

In the beginning of 2011, the station was still not open, and Jurandir Fernandes, Secretary of Metropolitan Transports of the new state administration, established a new date, now in the middle of the year, along with Butantã station. After the balance of the Goldman administration rated Pinheiros and Butantã stations as "completed", only waiting for tests, the new government published that there were finishing to be done and the CPTM connection. The environmental licence to operate the station was obtained along with São Paulo State Environmental Company (CETESP) on February. With that, according to Folha de S. Paulo newspaper report, the Metro would have an "off the records" goal to open the Butantã station on March and Pinheiros until April, with prevision of working during the peak times until June. The same newspaper would investigate, a month later, that, besides the opening schedule was kept, the CPTM connection was only scheduled to May, and the operation in full time until the end of the semester. On April, the opening was scheduled to 16 May 2011. Residents of the region heard by Jornal da Tarde said they were relieved for finally the station have an official opening date after a long period of construction. The rent prices fell after the January 2007 accident, changing the profile of the neighbourhood.

The station was opened, as the most recent prediction, on 16 May 2011, and it had protests of families of the victims of the 2007 accident in the station construction. The connection with the CPTM homonym station wasn't completed at time, and passengers who wanted to make the connection had to leave the station, go around the block and pay a new fee. The prediction was that, when the connection with the CPTM was completed in Pinheiros, the volume of the Line 4-Yellow commuters would triplicate. The connection was opened on 3 July 2011, one day before the scheduled date, because of a CPTM employees' strike in the day before. The catwalk has 56.56 metres (185.6 ft) of length, 8.9 metres (29 ft) of width, and 6.65 metres (21.8 ft) of height.

Pinheiros was the deepest São Paulo Metro station until September 2018, with the opening of Line 5-Lilac station Santa Cruz. Its platforms are localized 30 m (98 ft) under Pinheiros River stream bed.

== Station layout ==
G	Street level	Exit/entrance, fare control, ticket office, customer service, Bilhete Único/TOP recharge machines, transfer to
S1	Stairs level 1	Access to platforms
S2	Stairs level 2	Access to platforms
S3	Stairs level 3	Access to platforms
M	Concourse	Distribution concourse
P Platform level
P Platform level	Side platform, doors open on the right
P Platform level	Southbound	← toward Vila Sônia–Professora Elisabeth Tenreiro
P Platform level	Northbound	toward Luz →
P Platform level	Side platform, doors open on the right
