= Ceasa (CPTM) =

Railway station in São Paulo, Brazil

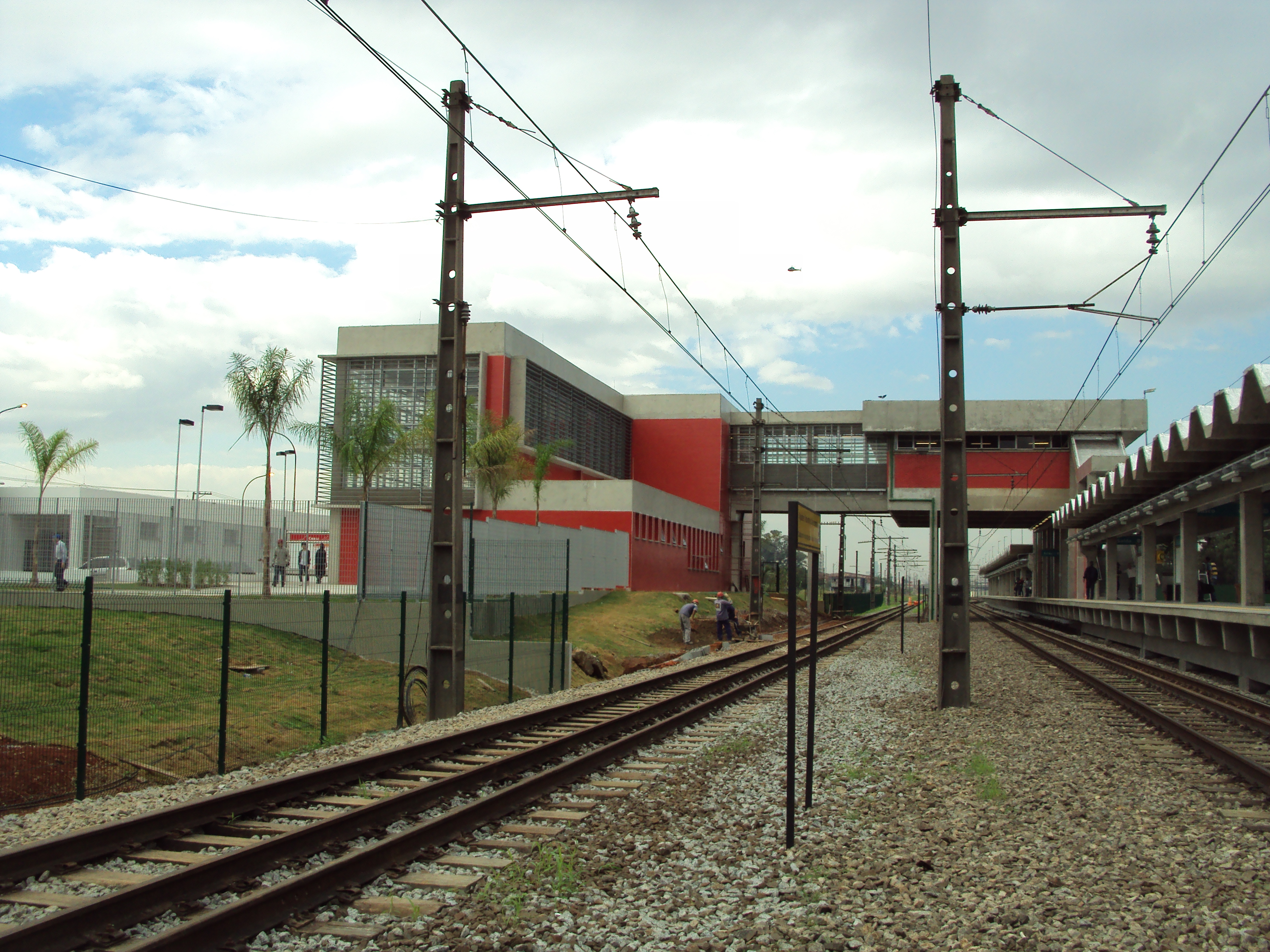
- On the left, building built between 2009 and 2010. On the right, building built in 1980.

General information
- Location: Av. das Nações Unidas, 1390; Vila Leopoldina; Brazil
- Coordinates: 23.537412°S 46.742604°W
- Owner: Government of the State of São Paulo
- Operator: ViaMobilidade Linhas 8 e 9 (Motiva)
- Platforms: Island platform

Construction
- Structure type: At-grade

Other information
- Station code: CEA

History
- Opened: 4 April 1981; 45 years ago

Services
Preceding station	São Paulo Metropolitan Trains	Following station
Presidente Altino towards Osasco	Line 9	Villa Lobos-Jaguaré towards Varginha
Track layout
Location

Ceasa is a train station on ViaMobilidade Linhas 8 e 9 Line 9-Emerald, located in the district of Vila Leopoldina, city of São Paulo.

== History ==
The station was built by Fepasa in 1979, during the modernization of Jurubatuba Branch and old Sorocaba Railway, and opened on 4 April 1981, being located next to São Paulo Depots and General Warehouses Company (CEAGESP). Since 1996, the station is operated by CPTM. It was reformed and reopened on 28 March 2010.
