= Villa Lobos-Jaguaré (CPTM) =

Railway station in São Paulo, Brazil

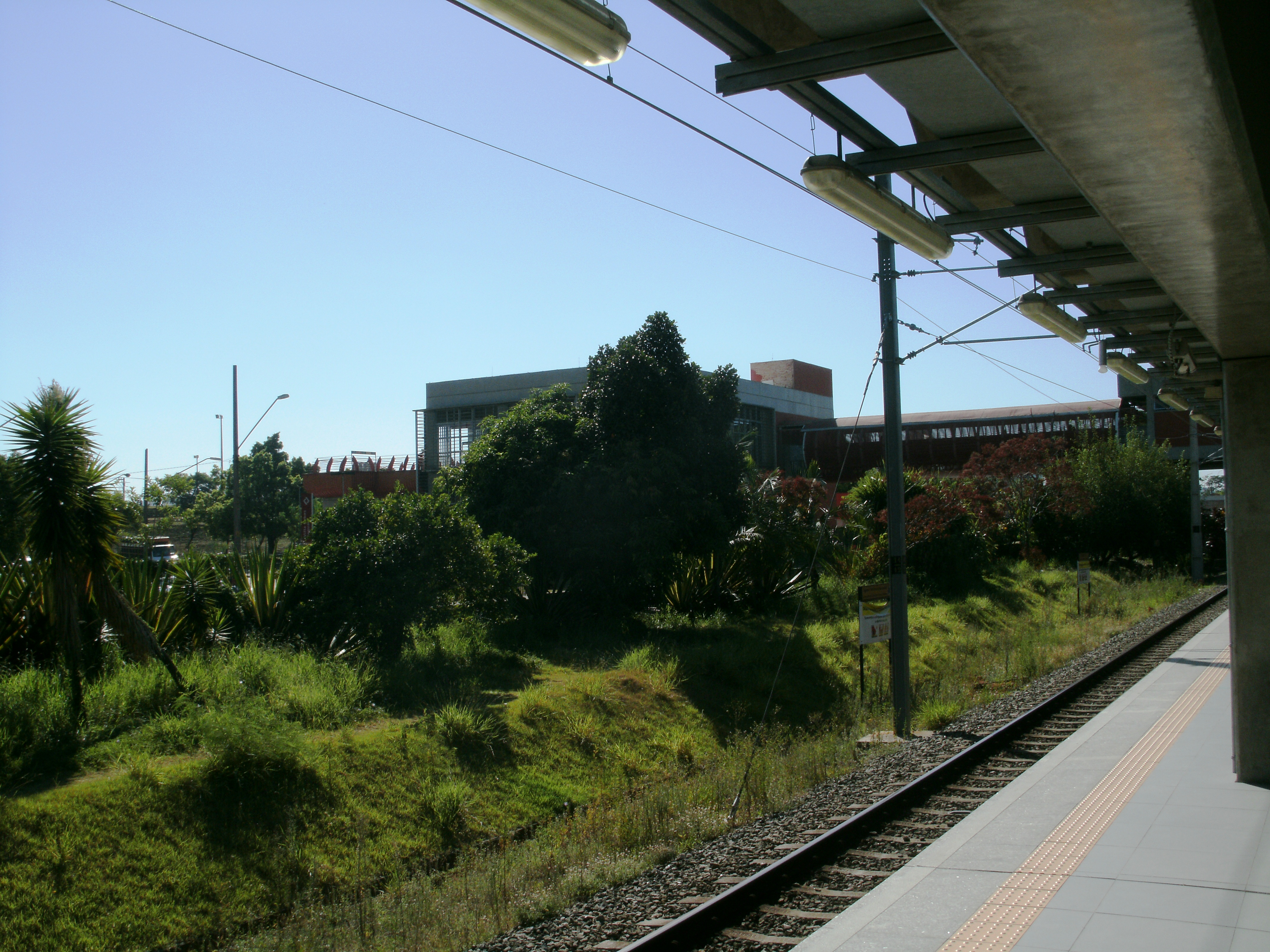

General information
- Location: Av. das Nações Unidas, 2100; Jaguaré; Brazil
- Coordinates: 23.546009°S 46.732798°W
- Owner: Government of the State of São Paulo
- Operator: ViaMobilidade Linhas 8 e 9 (Motiva)
- Platforms: Island platform

Construction
- Structure type: At-grade

Other information
- Station code: JAG

History
- Opened: 4 April 1981; 45 years ago
- Former names: Jaguaré

Services
Preceding station	São Paulo Metropolitan Trains	Following station
Ceasa towards Osasco	Line 9	Cidade Universitária towards Varginha
Track layout
Location

Villa Lobos-Jaguaré is a train station on ViaMobilidade Linhas 8 e 9 Line 9-Emerald, in the district of Jaguare in São Paulo. In the future, it might be connected with an unnamed CPTM line in project.

== History ==
The station was built by Fepasa in 1979, during the modernization of Jurubatuba branch of the old EFS, and opened on 4 April 1981, named Jaguaré, located next to Villa-Lobos Park, opened in 1994. Since 1996, it is operated by CPTM. It was reformed and reopened on 28 March 2010.
