= Socorro (CPTM) =

Railway station in São Paulo, Brazil

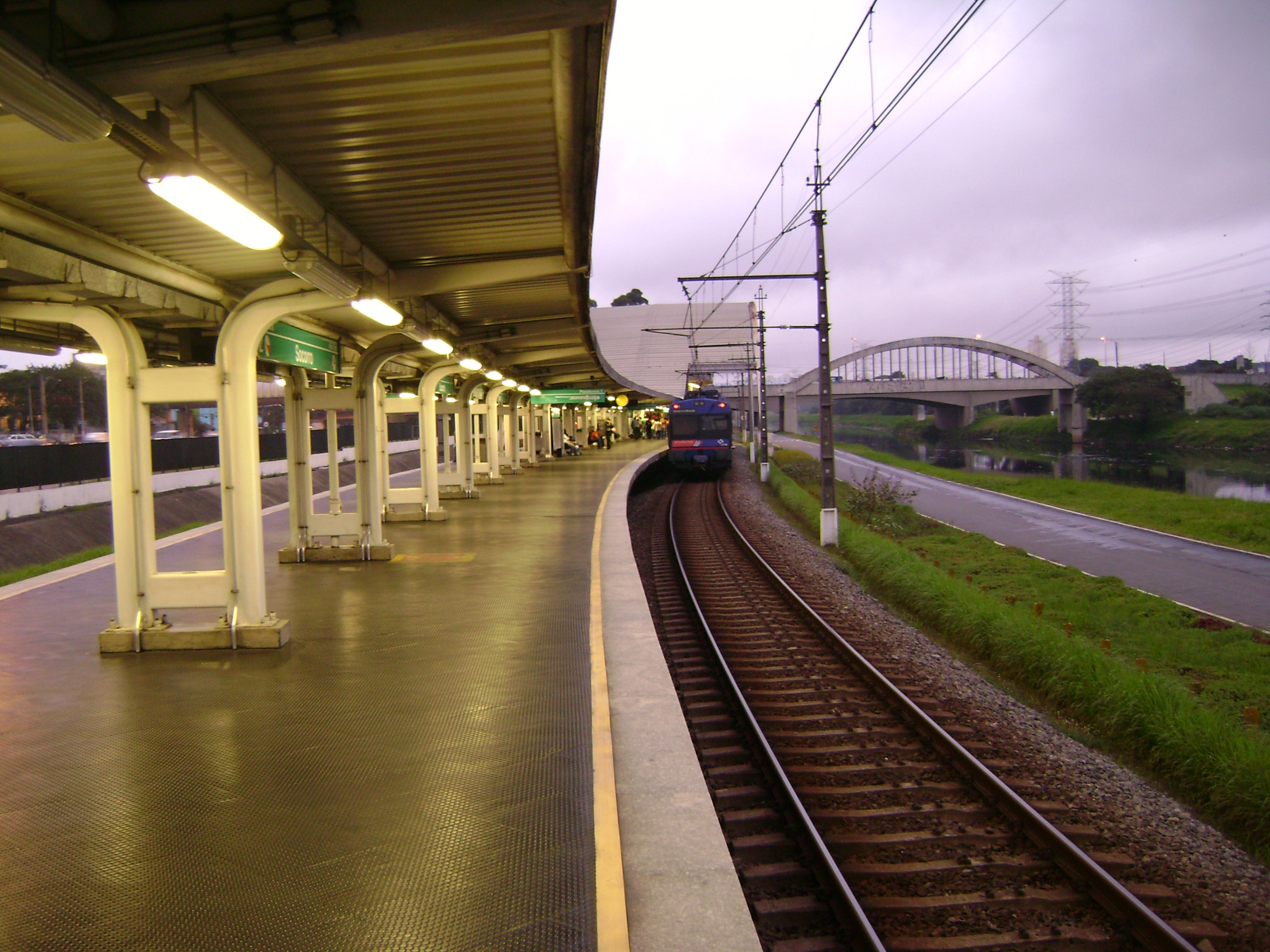
- Platform of the station in the evening.

General information
- Location: Av. das Nações Unidas, s/n Santo Amaro; Brazil
- Coordinates: 23.663486°S 46.710815°W
- Owner: Government of the State of São Paulo
- Operator: ViaMobilidade Linhas 8 e 9 (Motiva)
- Platforms: Island platform

Construction
- Structure type: At-grade
- Architect: Luiz Carlos Esteves

Other information
- Station code: SOC

History
- Opened: 11 November 1960; 65 years ago
- Rebuilt: 4 May 2000; 26 years ago

Services
Preceding station	São Paulo Metropolitan Trains	Following station
Santo Amaro towards Osasco	Line 9	Jurubatuba towards Varginha
Track layout
Location

Socorro is a train station on ViaMobilidade Linhas 8 e 9 Line 9-Emerald, located in the district of Santo Amaro in São Paulo.

== History ==
The original Socorro station was opened by EFS on 11 November 1960. In the 1970s, it was demolished so a new one could be constructed, which was reopened on 4 May 2000, in a different location, by CPTM.

== See also ==
- Socorro (district of São Paulo)
- Line 9 (CPTM)
- Subprefecture of Capela do Socorro
- Roman Catholic Diocese of Santo Amaro
