= Pinheiros (disambiguation) =

Pinheiros is a district in the city of São Paulo, Brazil.

Pinheiros may also refer to:

== In São Paulo ==
- Subprefecture of Pinheiros
- Pinheiros (CPTM), a railway station
- Pinheiros (São Paulo Metro), a ViaQuatro railway station
- Pinheiros River, a river that flows through the city
- Esporte Clube Pinheiros, a multi-sports and social club
  - Esporte Clube Pinheiros (basketball)
  - Esporte Clube Pinheiros (handball)
  - Esporte Clube Pinheiros (women's volleyball)

== Elsewhere in Brazil ==
- Pinheiros, Espírito Santo, a municipality
- Morro dos Pinheiros, a neighborhood in Teresópolis
- Esporte Clube Pinheiros (PR), a football club in Curitiba 1914–1989
