= Pinheiros (CPTM) =

Railway station in São Paulo, Brazil

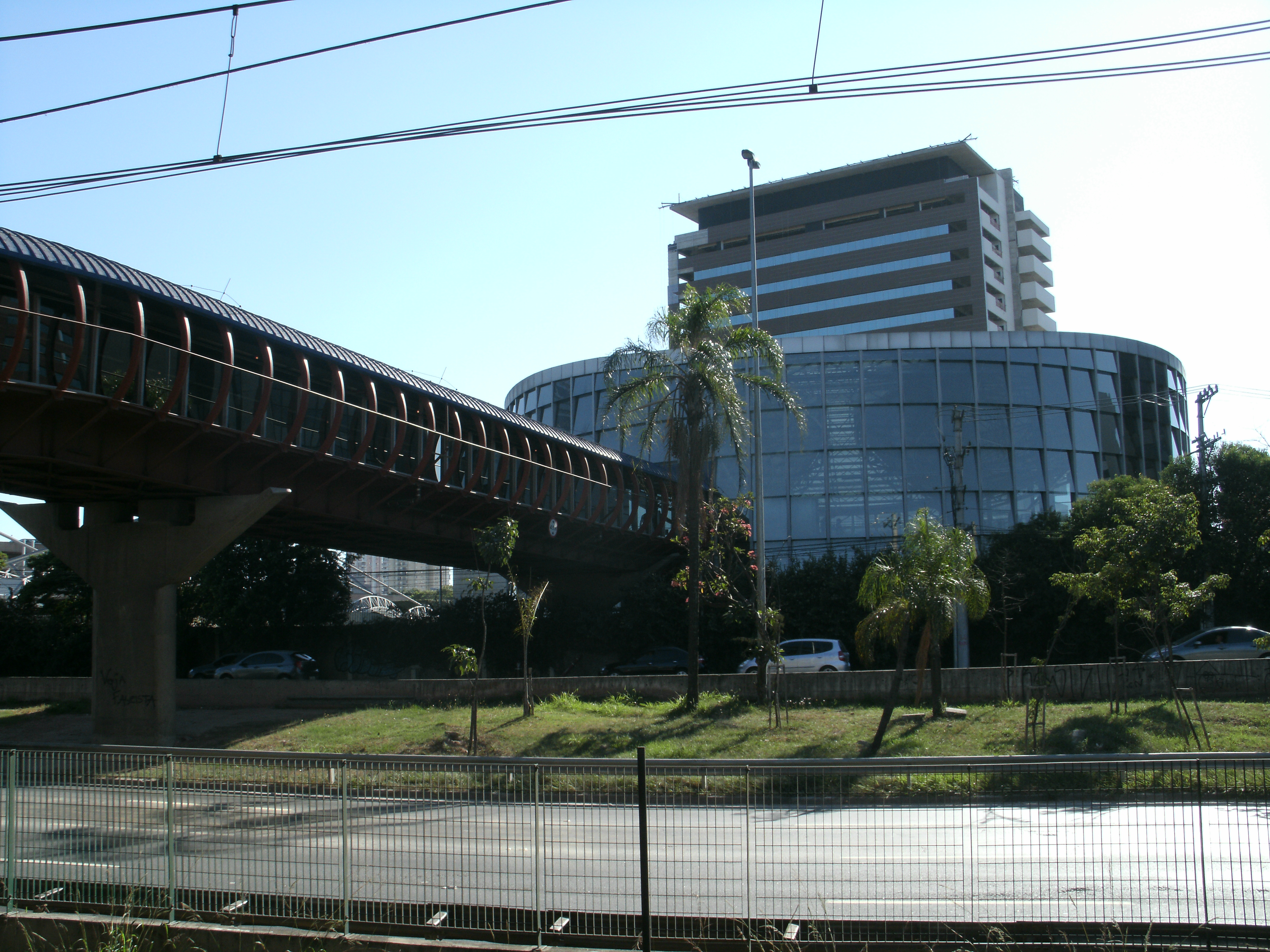
- Pinheiros station building of Lines 4 and 9 and access catwalk for CPTM Line 9 station.

General information
- Location: R. Capri, 145; Pinheiros; Brazil
- Coordinates: 23.536111°S 46.634722°W
- Owner: Government of the State of São Paulo
- Operator: ViaMobilidade Linhas 8 e 9 (Motiva)
- Platforms: Island platform
- Connections: Pinheiros Bus Terminal

Construction
- Structure type: At-grade

Other information
- Station code: PIN

History
- Opened: 4 April 1981; 45 years ago

Services
| Preceding station | São Paulo Metropolitan Trains | Following station |
|---|---|---|
| Cidade Universitária towards Osasco | Line 9 | Hebraica-Rebouças towards Varginha |
Out-of-system interchange
| Preceding station | São Paulo Metro | Following station |
|---|---|---|
| Butantã towards Vila Sônia-Professora Elisabeth Tenreiro | Line 4 transfer at Pinheiros | Faria Lima towards Luz |
Track layout
Location

Pinheiros is a train station on ViaMobilidade Linhas 8 e 9 Line 9-Emerald, with connection with Motiva Linha 4 Line 4-Yellow. It is located in the district of Pinheiros in São Paulo.

== History ==
Pinheiros station was opened, with temporary installations, by Estrada de Ferro Sorocabana (EFS), along with the Jurubatuba branch, on 25 January 1957. The definitive installations were opened in 1958. In 1971, Fepasa incorporated EFS and began a modernization plan of the Jurubatuba branch. The station was considered of difficult access, because any passenger who leaves that station, had to, obligatorily, cross two ways of Marginal Pinheiros, one of the most crowded roads of the city, which caused many trampling cases. Pinheiros station was rebuilt, being reopened on 4 May 1981. The station was transferred to CPTM in 1996.

To give more comfort to the commuters, especially commuters from Line 5-Lilac who use Line 9-Emerald to access Line 4-Yellow, CPTM does a special operation during peak hours, where this station is used as the terminus, avoiding overcrowding in the trains.
