= Presidente Altino (CPTM) =

Railway station in São Paulo, Brazil

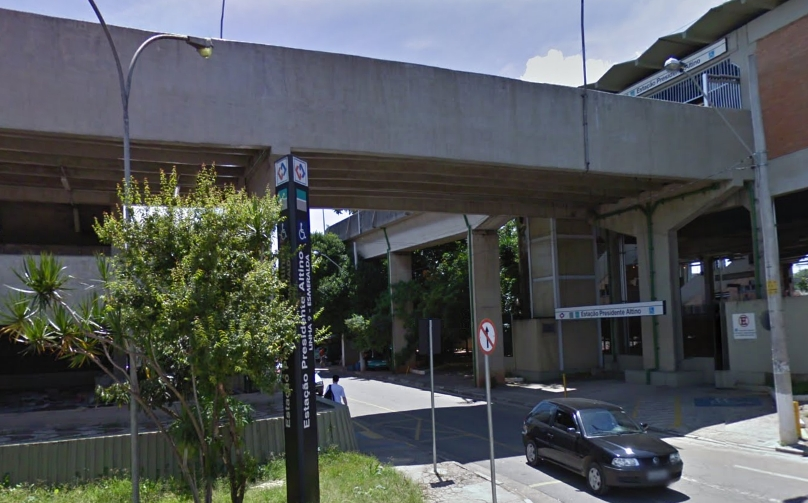
- Building of Presidente Altino station.

General information
- Location: R. Abílio Mendes, 8 Presidente Altino; Brazil
- Coordinates: 23.53125°S 46.76175°W
- Owner: Government of the State of São Paulo
- Operator: ViaMobilidade Linhas 8 e 9 (Motiva)
- Platforms: 2 Island platforms

Construction
- Structure type: Surface

Other information
- Station code: PAL

History
- Opened: 6 March 1919; 107 years ago
- Rebuilt: 25 January 1979; 47 years ago
- Former names: Km 14; General Miguel Costa

Services
| Preceding station | São Paulo Metropolitan Trains | Following station |
|---|---|---|
| Osasco towards Amador Bueno | Line 8 | Imperatriz Leopoldina towards Júlio Prestes |
| Osasco Terminus | Line 9 | Ceasa towards Varginha |
Track layout
Location

Presidente Altino is a train station on ViaMobilidade Linhas 8 e 9 Lines 8-Diamond and 9-Emerald, located in the district of President Altino in the city of Osasco.

== History ==
The station had its construction started in mid-1918 by Sorocaba Railway, named Km 14, but in the same year was renamed to Presidente Altino, a tribute to Altino Arantes, then President of the State of São Paulo and who privatized EFS in 1919.

In 1930, it was renamed to General Miguel Costa, but, in 1932, the renaming was undone, and the name Presidente Altino was kept until nowadays. In 1976, Fepasa begins the modernization of commuter trains and expand the existing maintenance yard next to the new station. which was reopened on 25 January 1979. In the same year, the station becomes an interchange station with the Jurubatuba branch. In 1996, CPTM starts operating West and South Lines from Fepasa and renames them as Line B-Gray and C-Celeste, respectively. In April 2008, it was determined that Line B-Gray would become Line 8-Diamond, and Line C-Celeste would become Line 9-Emerald.

=== Access catwalk ===
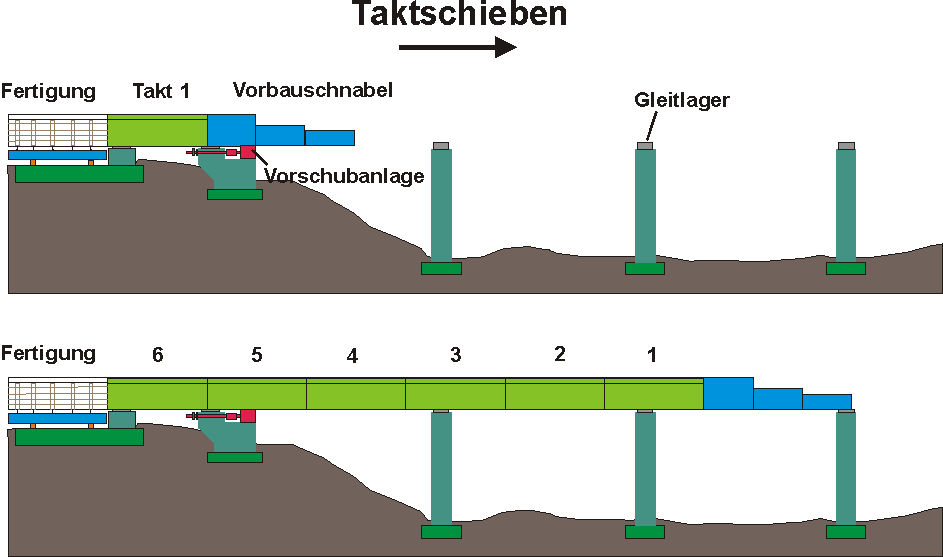
Increment launch method

To expand the access capacity of Presidente Altino station, Fepasa hired Construtora Azevedo e Travassos and Maubertec Engenharia e Projetos Ltda to implement a 170 metres (560 ft) catwalk over the station yard. To implement it, without interfering in the yard of the railway operation, it was used for the first time in Brazil the increment launch method, created in Germany. In about a year, the catwalk was delivered to the traffic.
