= Jaguaré (disambiguation) =

Jaguaré is a Brazilian municipality.

Jaguaré may also refer to:

- Jaguaré (district of São Paulo), subprefecture in São Paulo, Brazil
- Associação Jaguaré Esporte Clube, known as Jaguaré, Brazilian football club
- Villa Lobos-Jaguaré (CPTM), train station in São Paulo, Brazil
- Jaguaré (footballer) (1905-1946), Jaguaré Bezerra de Vasconcelos, Brazilian footballer

== See also ==
- Jaguar (disambiguation)
