= João Dias (CPTM) =

Railway station in São Paulo, Brazil

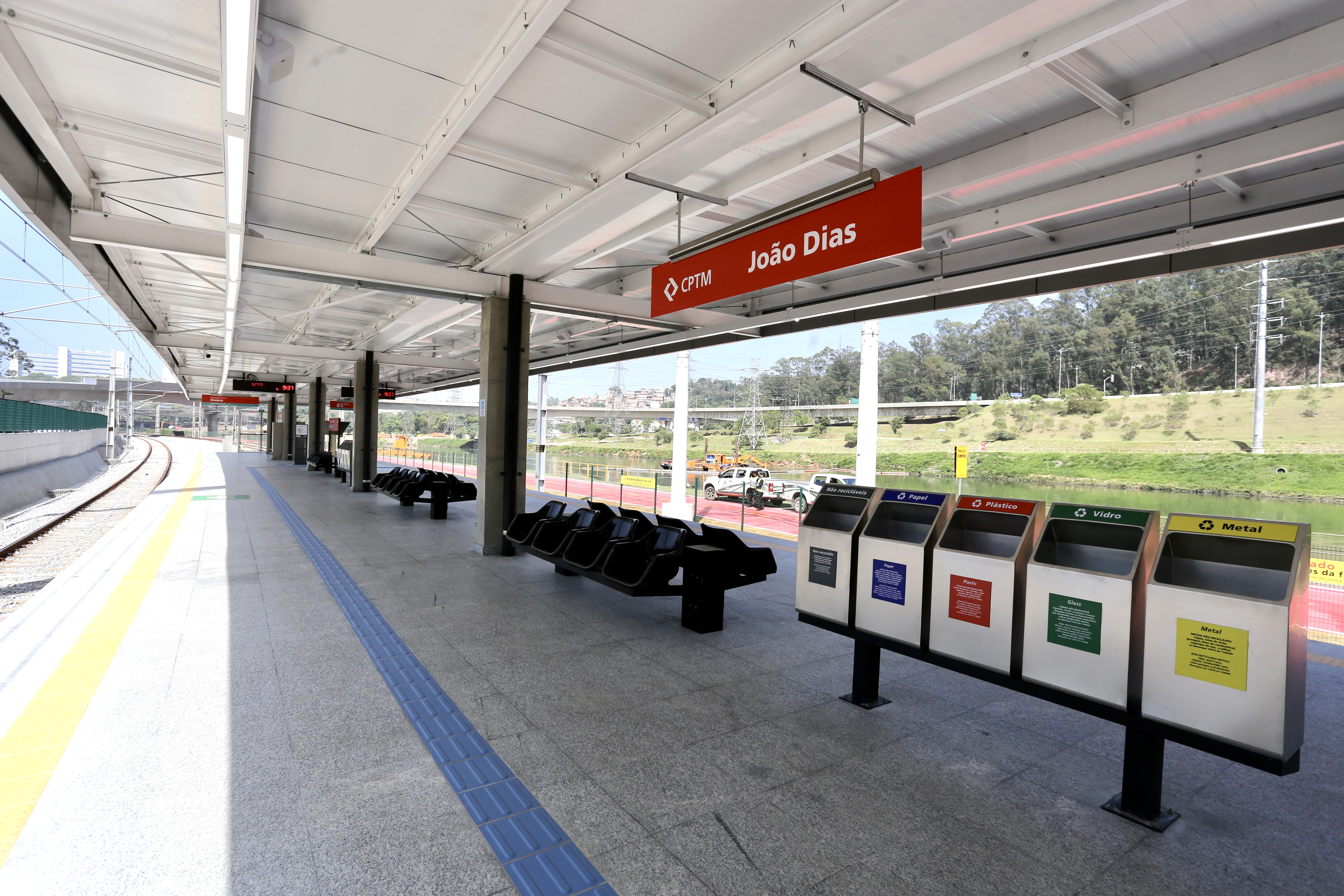
- The station on its opening day

General information
- Location: Av. das Nações Unidas, 17007; Santo Amaro; Brazil
- Coordinates: 23.640556°S 46.723333°W
- Owner: Government of the State of São Paulo
- Operator: ViaMobilidade Linhas 8 e 9 (Motiva)
- Platforms: Island platform

Construction
- Structure type: At-grade

Other information
- Station code: JOD

History
- Opened: 5 November 2021; 4 years ago

Services
Preceding station	São Paulo Metropolitan Trains	Following station
Granja Julieta towards Osasco	Line 9	Santo Amaro towards Varginha
Track layout
Location

João Dias is a train station on ViaMobilidade Linhas 8 e 9 Line 9-Emerald, in the district of Santo Amaro in São Paulo.

== History ==
João Dias station is a project from the 1980s in the FEPASA metropolitan train remodeling plan. After the execution of the plan during the turn of the 20th to the 21st century, the station was not built. In 2010, the plan returned in the CPTM Director Plan, scheduled to be built in 2025, with a daily average of 8,119 passengers.

Recently, the construction company Brookfield Brasil raised a set of business buildings named 17007 Nações, next to Line 9 and Marginal Pinheiros. As a counterpart of impact on traffic, because it is considered a traffic generator pole, Brookfield proposed the construction of João Dias station. On 1 March 2019, an agreement was signed between CPTM and Brookfield (through its dealership Tegra) predicting the donation of the station project and required area for it. The project predicts the implementation of João Dias station between Granja Julieta and Santo Amaro.

Construction began in April 2020 and the station is expected to be opened in the second half of 2022. In August 2021, the State Secretary of Metropolitan Transportation, Alexandre Baldy, confirmed the opening to September 2021, later delayed to October.
