= Cidade Universitária Station =

Cidade Universitária Station is the name of two stations.

- Cidade Universitária, a train station in São Paulo, Brazil.
- Cidade Universitária, a metro station in Lisbon, Portugal.

== See also ==
- Cidade Universitária, a neighborhood of Rio de Janeiro, Brazil.
