= Vila Leopoldina =

District of São Paulo, Brazil

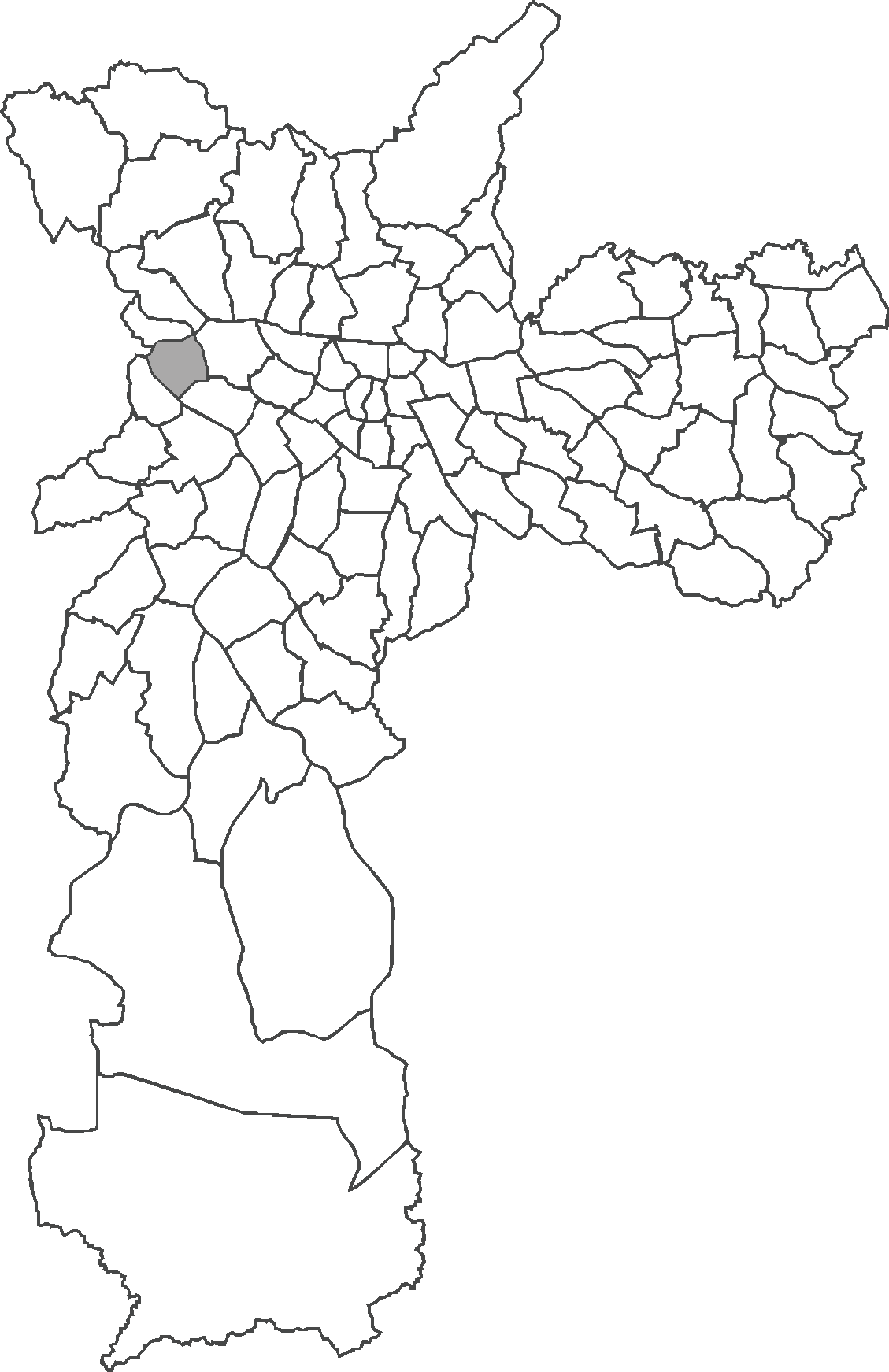
- Location in the city of São Paulo
- Country: Brazil
- State: São Paulo
- City: São Paulo

Government
  - Type: Subprefecture
  - Subprefect: Soninha Francine

Area
  - Total: 5.6 km^{2} (2.2 sq mi)

Population (2000)
  - Total: 26.870
- HDI: 0.907 –high
- Website: Subprefecture of Lapa

Vila Leopoldina is a district in the subprefecture of Lapa in the city of São Paulo, Brazil.

== History ==
It originated as an extension of the Lapa district and initially had characteristics of a working-class region. Initially, it was known as Emboaçava, in reference to a farm of the same name that existed in the region, and later as Várzea das Correias, in reference to the owner of the farm, João Correia da Silva.

In 1894, a company acquired the farms there and began to divide up the large plot of land with thousands of square meters, beginning the subdivision of the district. One of the company's partners, Dona Leopoldina Kleeberg, was responsible for naming the district as it is known today. At the time, the main means of getting to the region were by train, tram and steamboat.

The region received significant investment from the São Paulo Railway, which helped to build tram and electricity lines in the surrounding area. As a result, several industries began to establish themselves in the district. In the 1960s, the development of the region was boosted with the opening of the Lapa Market and the Ceasa (currently Ceagesp).

It has now become a well-established area of apartments for upper-middle-class residents, in addition to attracting advertising agencies, content producers, and photography and film studios. The district is served by metropolitan trains via lines 8–Diamante at Imperatriz Leopoldina Station and 9–Esmeralda at Ceasa Station.

As an attraction, the district is home to the Professor Dimas de Melo Pimenta Clock Museum, which houses more than 600 clocks of various models and from all over the world.

This district is also home to the Lapa Cemetery, opened in 1918 to house many people who died from the Spanish flu.

Vila Leopoldina hosted the first edition of the MITA Festival in 2022, held at the Spark Arena, set up inside the ARCA. The event featured attractions such as Gilberto Gil, Matuê, Marcelo D2, Two Door Cinema Club and headliners Gorillaz and Rüfüs du Sol.

An urban operation coordinated by the City of São Paulo is promoting a process of verticalization and densification of the district, originally occupied by industrial warehouses, with the aim of occupying the region and reducing urban degradation. The district has experienced an accelerated process of real estate expansion, with the construction of new and modern apartment buildings. As a result of this process, the region around Rua Carlos Weber has been called the "Nova Moema", a region that underwent a similar process in the 1970s.
