= Cidade Universitária (CPTM) =

Railway station in São Paulo, Brazil

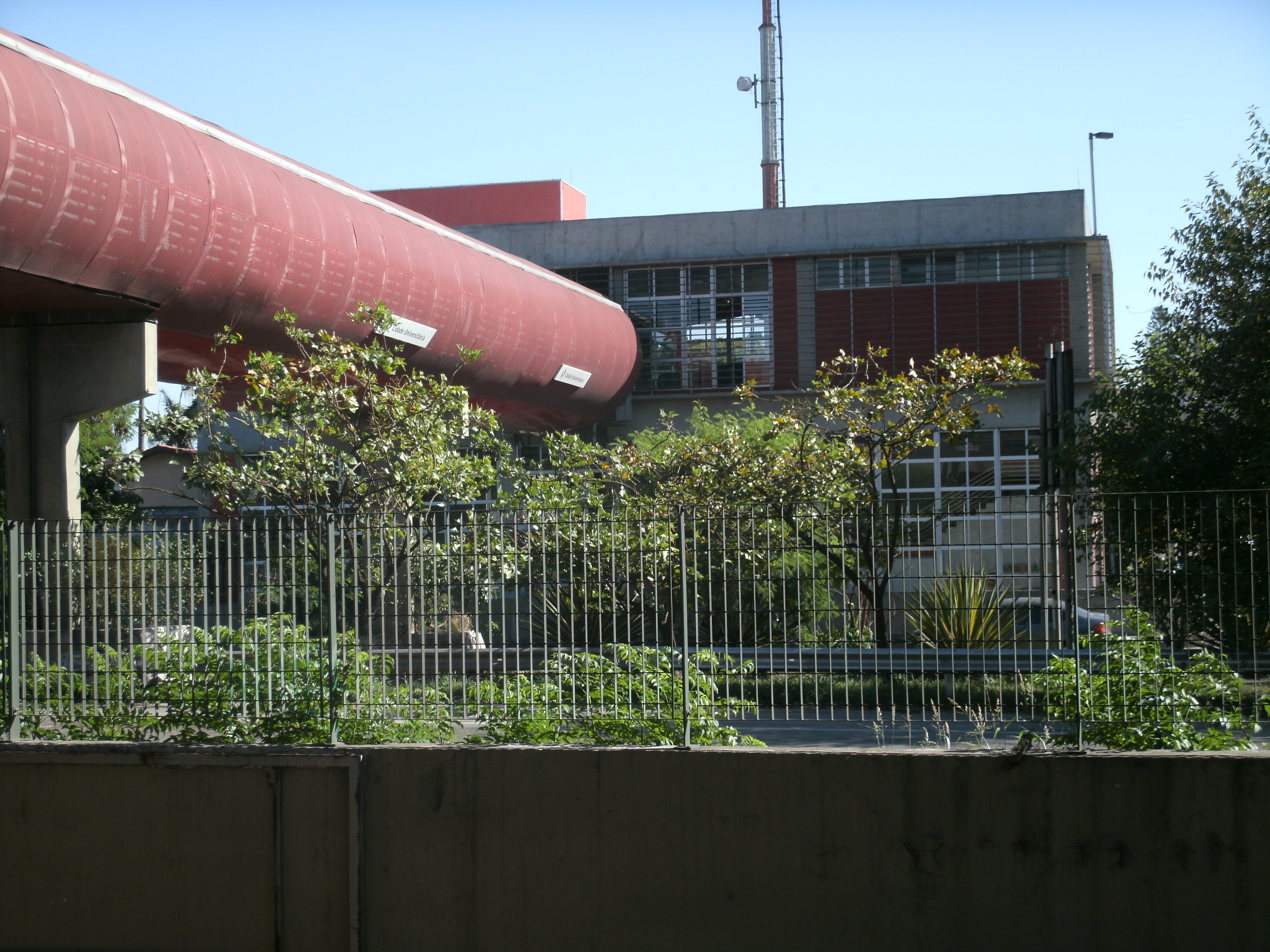

General information
- Location: Av. das Nações Unidas, 6202; Alto de Pinheiros; Brazil
- Coordinates: 23.557639°S 46.711764°W
- Owner: Government of the State of São Paulo
- Operator: ViaMobilidade Linhas 8 e 9 (Motiva)
- Platforms: Island platform
- Connections: Vila Madalena (2000–2011) (Note: Until 2011, the Orca Shuttle Service connected Cidade Universitária station and São Paulo Metro station Vila Madalena.)

Construction
- Structure type: At-grade

Other information
- Station code: USP

History
- Opened: 4 April 1981; 45 years ago

Services
Preceding station	São Paulo Metropolitan Trains	Following station
Villa Lobos-Jaguaré towards Osasco	Line 9	Pinheiros towards Varginha
Track layout
Location

Cidade Universitária is a train station on ViaMobilidade Linhas 8 e 9 Line 9-Emerald, in the district of Alto de Pinheiros in São Paulo.

== History ==
The station was built by Fepasa to attend University of São Paulo students, being opened on 4 April 1981. In 1996, CPTM starts operating the Fepasa commuter train lines, including this station. It was reformed and reopened on 28 March 2010. Between 28 August 2000 and 9 September 2011, it was connected with São Paulo Metro station Vila Madalena through the Orca Shuttle Service.
