= ViaMobilidade Series 8900 =

Series 8900
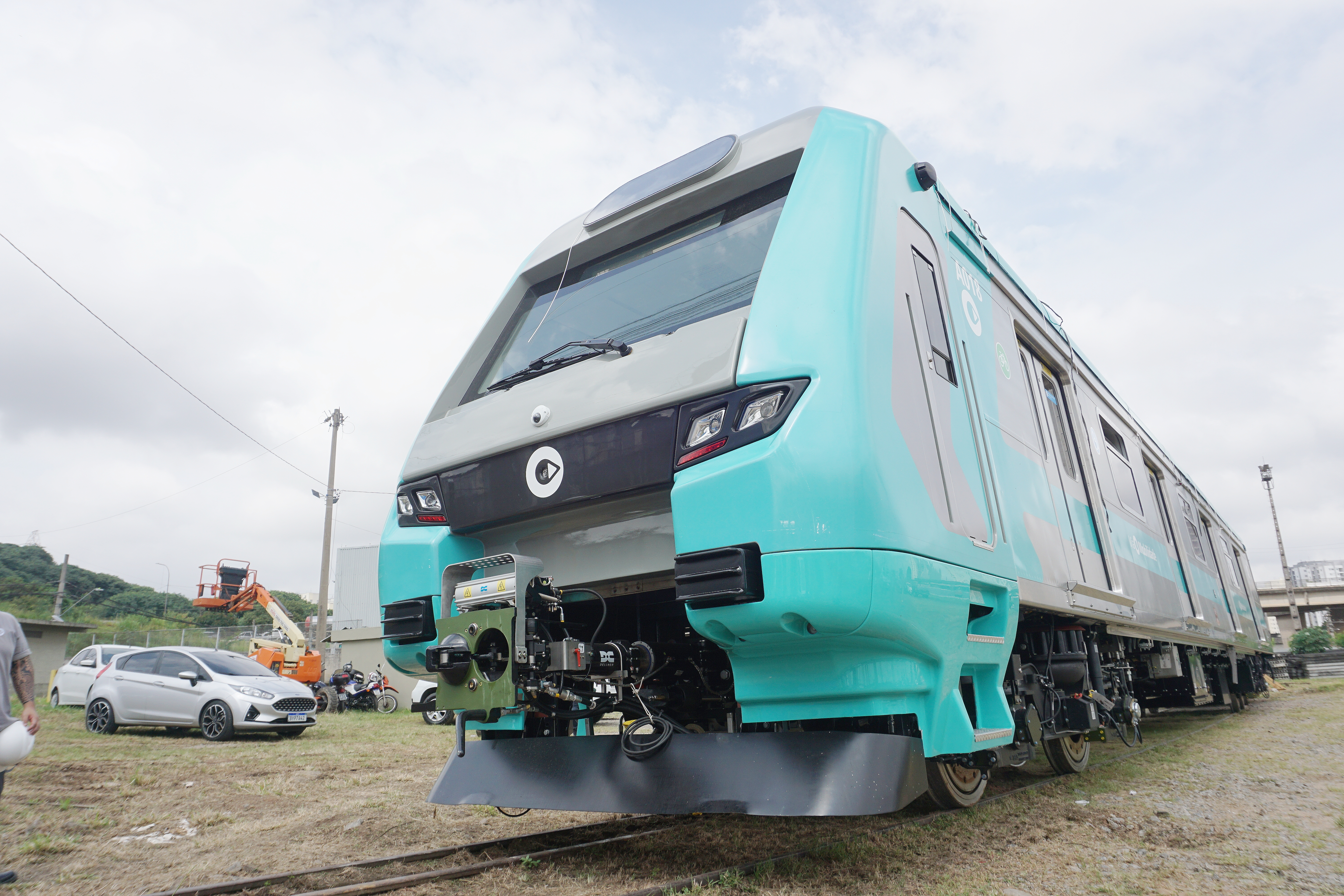
- A Series 8901 train on Presidente Altino Yard

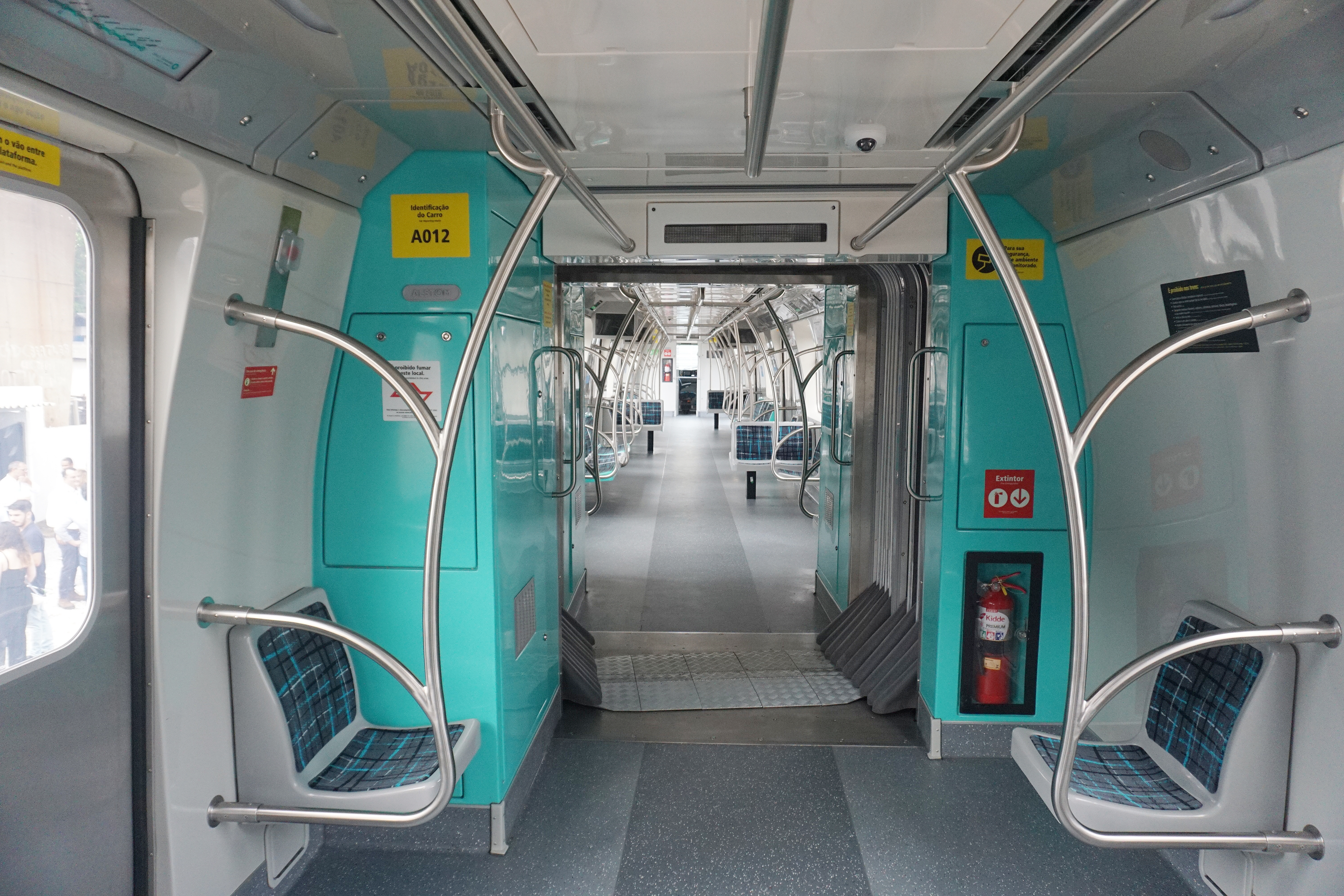
- In service: 2023–present
- Manufacturer: Alstom
- Built at: Taubaté, São Paulo
- Family name: Alstom Metropolis
- Constructed: 2022–2024
- Entered service: 8 June 2023
- Number built: 288 carriages (36 sets)
- Number in service: 280 carriages (35 sets)
- Formation: 8-car sets
- Fleet numbers: A01x–A36x
- Operator: ViaMobilidade
- Depot: Presidente Altino Yard

Specifications
- Car body construction: Stainless steel
- Doors: 8 sets of side doors per car
- Maximum speed: 90 km/h (56 mph)
- Traction motors: 16 × asynchronous 3-phase AC
- HVAC: Air conditioning
- Electric systems: 3 kV DC overhead line
- Current collection: Pantograph
- UIC classification: Bo′Bo′+2′2′+2′2′+Bo′Bo′+Bo′Bo′+2′2′+2′2′+Bo′Bo′
- Coupling system: Dellner
- Track gauge: 1,600 mm (5 ft 3 in)

The ViaMobilidade Series 8900 is a class of electric multiple units built by Alstom to operate on ViaMobilidade Lines 8-Diamond and 9-Emerald. The first train was delivered in 2023, which is already in service. Each composition was built based on a new pattern adopted by CPTM for the system's units, with air conditioning, 8 cars and free gangway, allowing access to all of the cars, having the Series 9000 rolling stock project as base.

== History ==
=== Background ===
During the concession process of Lines 8 and 9 of the Metropolitan Trains, the acquisition of 30 new trains by the future operator was included as contractual clause. Posteriorly, the amount was increased to 34 trains delivered until 18 months after the contract signing. Even before the result of the concession, Folha de S. Paulo pointed Chinese CRRC Qingdao Sifang as favorite to build the 30 trains for the future operator due to the 12 months deadline after the contract signing for the deliver of the first train.

In the last train acquisition, aiming companies with factories in Brazil, companies Construcciones y Auxiliar de Ferrocarriles (CAF) and Hyundai Rotem took twice as long as needed to deliver the Series 8500 and Series 9500 and were fined by CPTM. While Rotem was fined on R$4.27 million for the delays, CAF was fined on R$8.37 million. In 2014, Alstom and CAF delivered Series 200 trains for Porto Alegre Metro with 20 manufacturing defects, some of them severe, resulting in a 2% fine on the contract after 6 years for the repair.

During the disputed for the concession of Lines 8 and 9, CAF partnered with Mobitrens consortium (composed by Comport, Líder and Consbem), while other companies chose to not partner with any of the others consortiums. On 20 April 2021, the state government of São Paulo declared winner ViaMobilidade Linhas 8 e 9 consortium (composed by Grupo CCR and RuasInvest), with Mobitrens consortium placing second.

=== Construction ===
Three months after the concession contract signing, ViaMobilidade chose Alstom to build 36 trains (two more to replace two damaged CPTM Series 7000 trains delivered by the company as part of the contract), in a total of 288 cars.

The new trains began to be manufactured in a new Alstom plant, located in Taubaté. After the COVID-19 pandemic, Alstom faced difficulties in importing electronic parts and delayed the delivery of the trains. In November 2022, there were 22 cars under construction in Alstom's factory. The first train was supposed to be delivered on 20 January 2022.

The first train was delivered during an event on Presidente Altino Yard on 28 February 2023. The delay to deliver the trains made the operator to fine Alstom, while governor Tarcísio de Freitas announced a new scheduled for the delivery.

== Accidents and incidents ==
- 21 June 2023 – The first train operating presented a failure between João Dias and Santo Amaro stations. The passengers were evacuated and the composition transferred to the yard for analysis by Alstom. Damages on the train were found, due to passengers breaking a window in panic to leave the car. No one was harmed.

== See also ==
- Line 8 (CPTM)
- Line 9 (CPTM)
- ViaMobilidade
- São Paulo Metropolitan Trains rolling stock
