= Avenida Giovanni Gronchi =

Avenue in São Paulo, Brazil

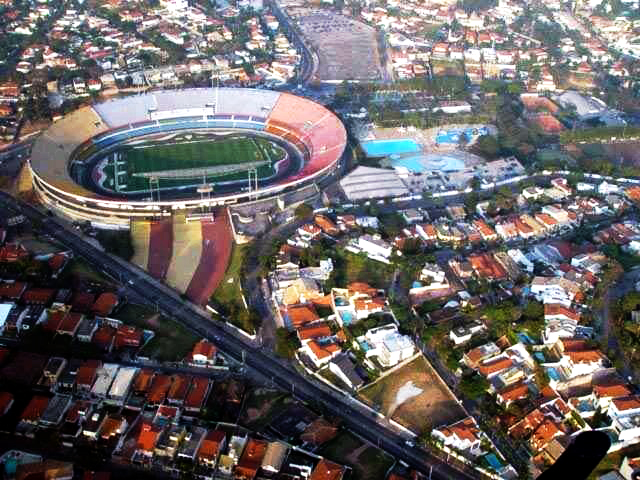
- The avenue seen diagonally in the lower part of the image, with the Estádio do Morumbi in the background
- Interactive map of Avenida Giovanni Gronchi
- Type: Avenue
- Length: 7,200 m
- Area: Morumbi; Vila Andrade; Vila Sônia
- Location: São Paulo, São Paulo, Brazil
- Arrondissement: Butantã Subprefecture; Campo Limpo Subprefecture
- Quarter: Vila Progredior; Jardim Leonor; Jardim Morumbi; Morumbi; Vila Sônia; Vila Andrade
- From: Avenida Morumbi, 3820
- To: Estrada de Itapecerica

Other
- Known for: Proximity to Estádio do Morumbi

Giovanni Gronchi Avenue is an important thoroughfare in the city of São Paulo, Brazil. It is the main traffic artery for the districts of Morumbi, Vila Andrade, and Vila Sônia, also connecting them to the Campo Limpo region. It is a road with predominantly commercial sections, interspersed with residential sections.

== Avenue ==
=== History ===
The avenue was named after the former Italian president who visited Brazil in 1958. The tribute, enacted by the São Paulo City Council in 1963, was made in disregard of a ruling, still in force today, which prohibits living persons from being honored in public places (Gronchi died in 1978, at the age of 91).

=== Currently ===
Shopping Jardim Sul and Morumbi Town Shopping are located on this avenue. The Estádio do Morumbi, belonging to São Paulo FC, an important tourist and sporting attraction in the city, is located in Roberto Gomes Pedrosa Square, which is crossed by this avenue. On days when the São Paulo team plays, it is common to see crowds of fans lining the streets along the avenue, singing songs related to the team and frequenting bars and bakeries along the avenue.

The final stretch of the road, between Carlos Caldeira Filho and João Dias avenues, is crossed by Line 5-Lilás of the São Paulo Metro, which has a station named after the avenue in its vicinity.
