= Giovanni Gronchi (São Paulo Metro) =

São Paulo Metro station

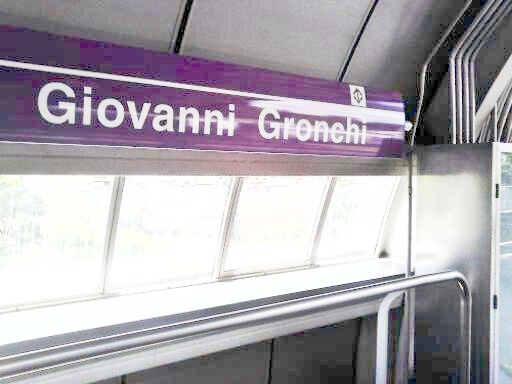
- Sign at Giovanni Gronchi Station

General information
- Location: Av. João Dias, 3569, Vila Andrade; São Paulo; Brazil
- Coordinates: 23°38′38″S 46°44′03″W
- Owner: Government of the State of São Paulo
- Operator: Companhia do Metropolitano de São Paulo (2002–2018); Motiva Linhas 5 e 17 (2018–present)
- Platforms: Side platforms
- Connections: João Dias Bus Terminal; Itapecerica–João Dias–Santo Amaro Bus Corridor

Construction
- Structure type: Elevated
- Accessible: y
- Architect: Luiz Carlos Esteves

Other information
- Station code: GGR

History
- Opened: October 20, 2002

Services
Preceding station	São Paulo Metro	Following station
Vila das Belezas towards Capão Redondo	Line 5	Santo Amaro towards Chácara Klabin
Track layout
Location

Giovanni Gronchi is a metro station on Line 5 (Lilac) of the São Paulo Metro in the Vila Andrade district of São Paulo, Brazil.

== See also ==
- Avenida Giovanni Gronchi
