= Line 9 (CPTM) =

Commuter rail line in São Paulo

Line 9 (Emerald)

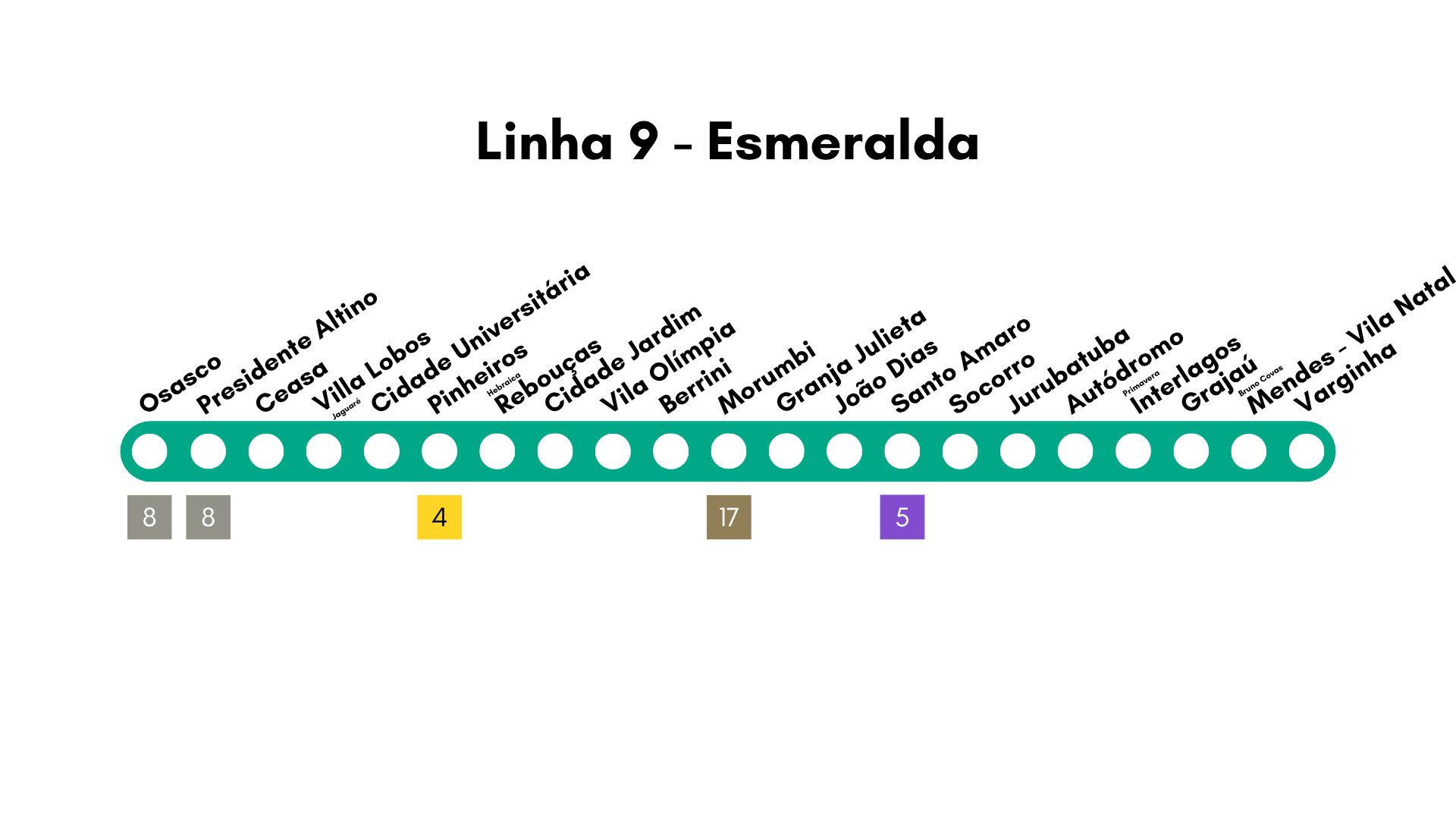

Overview
- Status: Operational
- Owner: Government of the State of São Paulo
- Locale: Greater São Paulo, Brazil
- Termini: Osasco; Varginha
- Connecting lines: Current: Planned: 20
- Stations: 21; 4 in project

Service
- Type: Commuter rail
- System: São Paulo Metropolitan Trains
- Services: Osasco ↔ Varginha; Pinheiros ↔ Jurubatuba (peak hour)
- Operator(s): ViaMobilidade (Motiva)
- Depot(s): Presidente Altino rail yard; Grajaú rail yard; Varginha rail yard
- Rolling stock: 152 CAF 7000 Series (19 trains); 64 CAF 7500 Series (8 trains); 280 CAF 8500 Series (35 trains); 200 Alstom 8900 Series (25 trains)

History
- Opened: 25 January 1957; 69 years ago
- Last extension: 10 August 2021; 4 years ago

Technical
- Line length: 39.1 km (24.3 mi)
- Character: At-grade
- Track gauge: 1,600 mm (5 ft 3 in)
- Old gauge: 1,000 mm (3 ft 3 3/8 in)
- Electrification: Overhead line, 3,000 V DC
- Operating speed: 80 km/h (50 mph)
- Signalling: Automatic block signaling

Line 9 (Emerald) (Portuguese: Linha 9–Esmeralda), formerly Line C (Sky Blue) (Linha C–Celeste) and Line C (Emerald) (Linha C–Esmeralda), is one of the thirteen lines that make up the São Paulo Metro Rail Transport Network in Brazil and one of the three lines operated by ViaMobilidade.

The line was previously operated by Fepasa, and subsequently by CPTM. Since 27 January 2022, ViaMobilidade has been operating it under a contract for 30 years, along with Line 8-Diamond.

== Characteristics ==
	Osasco ↔ Varginha
Extension	39.1 km (24.3 mi)
Average number of passengers carried/day	613.000
Gap time between trains (rush hour)	4 min
Stations	21
Trains (rush hour)	20 (24)
Time of ride	53 min (approx.)
Medium distance between stations	1.93 km (1.20 mi)
Seats offer (rush hour)	9345
Medium velocity (highest)	36 km/h / 22 mph (90 km/h / 56 mph)
Level crossing	0

== Stations ==
Code	Station	Platforms	Position	Connections	City
OSA	Osasco	Island platforms	At-grade	Osasco Bus Terminal; Osasco Road Terminal	Osasco
PAL	Presidente Altino	Island platforms	At-grade	ViaMobilidade Line 8 (CPTM)	Osasco
CEA	Ceasa	Island platform	At-grade	-	São Paulo
JAG	Villa Lobos-Jaguaré	Island platform	At-grade	-	São Paulo
USP	Cidade Universitária	Island platform	At-grade	-	São Paulo
PIN	Pinheiros	Island platform	At-grade	Pinheiros Bus Terminal	São Paulo
REB	Hebraica-Rebouças	Island platform	At-grade	-	São Paulo
CJD	Cidade Jardim	Island platform	At-grade	-	São Paulo
VOL	Vila Olímpia	Island platform	At-grade	-	São Paulo
BRR	Berrini	Island platform	At-grade	Diadema–Morumbi Metropolitan Corridor	São Paulo
MRB	Morumbi-Claro	Island platform	At-grade	Diadema–Morumbi Metropolitan Corridor	São Paulo
GJT	Granja Julieta	Island platform	At-grade	-	São Paulo
JOD	João Dias	Island platform	At-grade	-	São Paulo
SAM	Santo Amaro	Island platform	At-grade	Guido Caloi Bus Terminal	São Paulo
SOC	Socorro	Island platform	At-grade	-	São Paulo
JUR	Jurubatuba-Senac	Island platform	At-grade	-	São Paulo
AUT	Autódromo	Island platform	At-grade	-	São Paulo
INT	Primavera-Interlagos	Island platform	At-grade	-	São Paulo
GRA	Grajaú	Island platform	At-grade	Grajaú Bus Terminal	São Paulo
MVN	Bruno Covas/Mendes-Vila Natal	Island platform	Elevated	-	São Paulo
VAR	Varginha	Island platform	At-grade	Varginha Bus Terminal	São Paulo

== See also ==
- Santos-Jundiaí Railroad
- São Paulo Metropolitan Trains
- Line 10 (CPTM)
