= Diadema–Morumbi Metropolitan Corridor =

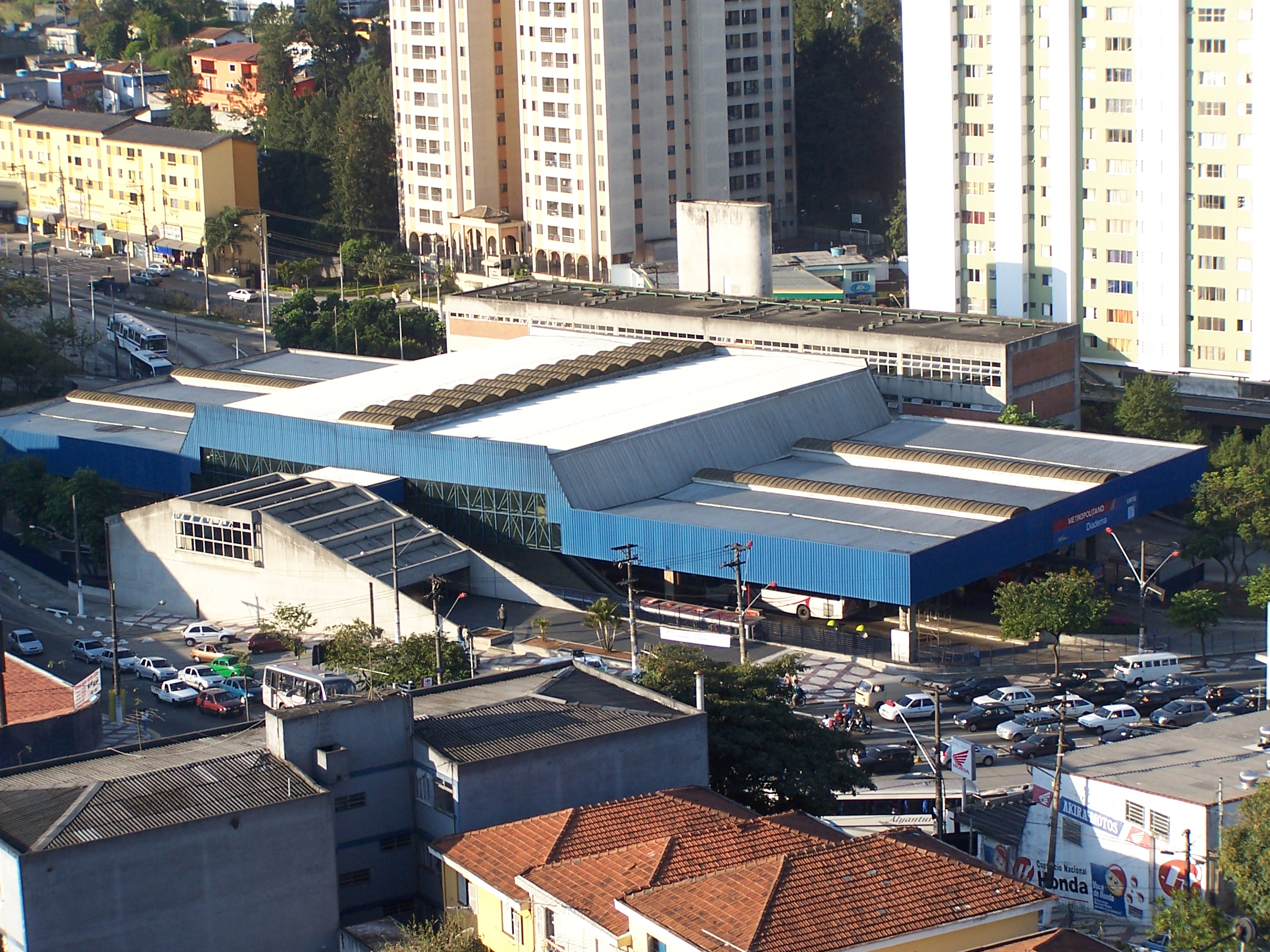
- Diademan Bus Terminal

Overview
- Owner: EMTU
- Locale: São Paulo; Diadema
- Transit type: Bus rapid transit
- Number of stations: 28
- Daily ridership: 85,000 passengers
- Website: www.metra.com.br

Operation
- Began operation: 2010 July 30; 16 years ago
- Operator: METRA

Technical
- System length: 12 km (7.5 mi)
- Top speed: 50 km/h (31 mph)

Diadema–Morumbi Metropolitan Corridor is an intermunicipal bus corridor of 12 kilometres (7.5 mi) corridor of extension that connect the cities of São Paulo and Diadema. Projected and built by EMTU, the line is currently administered by Metra, with an initial demand of 85,000 passengers per day.

== History ==
Project in the beginning of the 1980s, its construction only began in 1986, being paralyzed for many times. Only on 30 July 2010, 24 years later, the corridor was opened, under suspects of overpricing. Besides the line was planned to receive trolleybuses, it only operated with hybrid and diesel buses. Some constructions, such as Jardim Miriam Bus Terminal, never began.
