= ViaMobilidade Linhas 8 e 9 =

Brazilian rail transport company

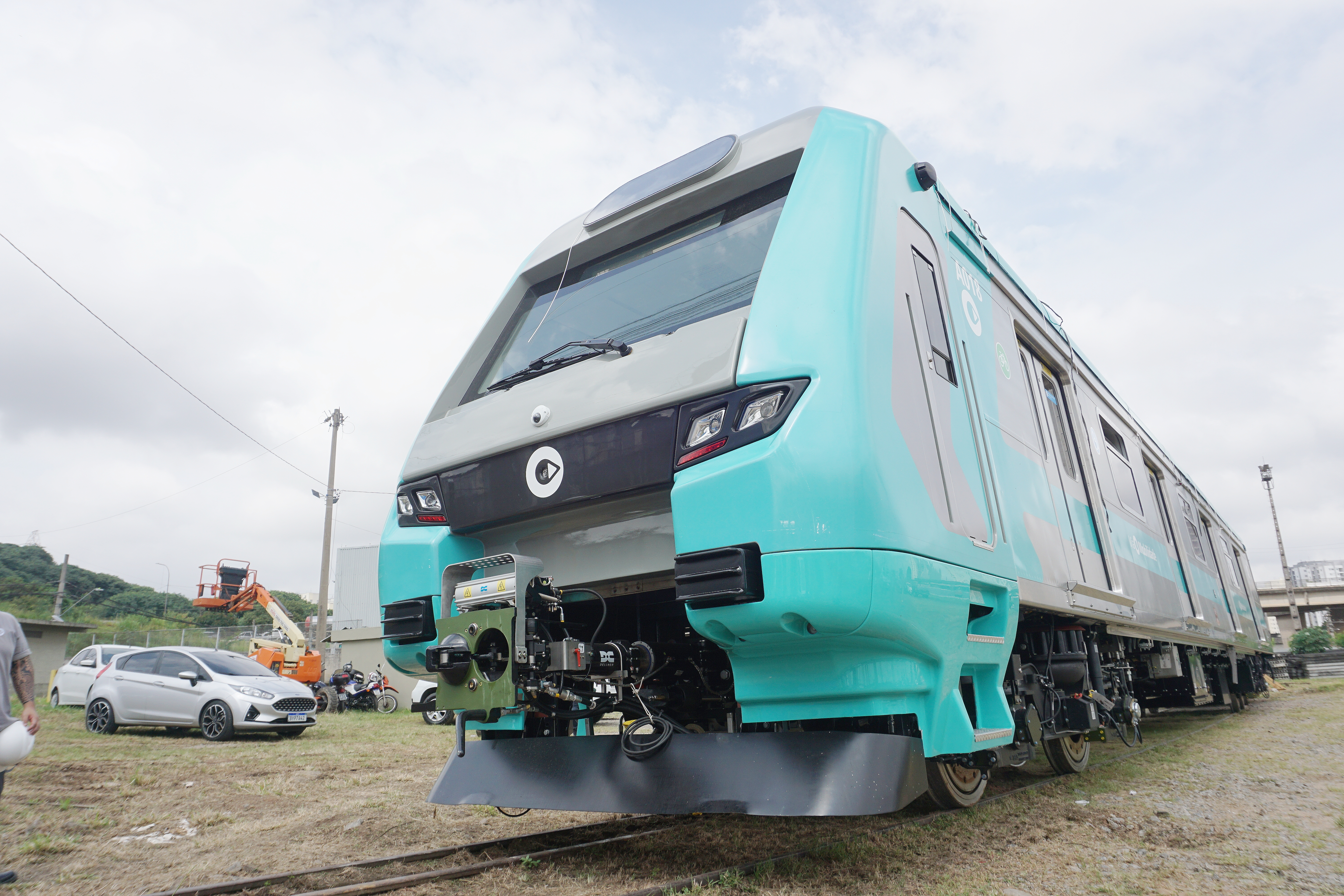

Overview
- Main regions: Greater São Paulo, Brazil
- Fleet: 280 Alstom 8900 Series (35 trains); 304 CAF 7000 Series (38 trains)
- Stations called at: 42
- Parent company: Motiva
- Key people: Andre Salcedo (CEO)
- Dates of operation: 2022–present
- Predecessor: CPTM

Technical
- Track gauge: 1,600 mm (5 ft 3 in)
- Electrification: Overhead line, 3,000 V DC
- Operating speed: 80 km/h (50 mph)

Other
- Website: trilhos.motiva.com.br/viamobilidade8e9/

ViaMobilidade Linhas 8 e 9 is a company in Brazil belonging to Motiva Trilhos, that has been responsible for the operation, maintenance and investments on Lines 8-Diamond and 9-Emerald for 30 years, through a public-private partnership concession contract in partnership with the State Government of São Paulo.

Besides Motiva, the consortium also has RuasInvest as an investor, a branch of one of the most traditional bus groups of São Paulo. Both companies also manage São Paulo Metro Line 4-Yellow of Motiva Linha 4, and Line 5-Lilac of Motiva Linhas 5 e 17.

== Lines ==
| Line | Color | Termini | Length | Stations |
|---|---|---|---|---|
| Line 8 | Diamond | Júlio Prestes ↔ Itapevi | 35.2 km (21.9 mi) | 20 |
| Line 9 | Emerald | Osasco ↔ Varginha | 39.1 km (24.3 mi) | 21 |

=== Operational Extensions ===
| Line | Color | Termini | Length | Stations | Notes |
|---|---|---|---|---|---|
| Line 8 | Diamond | Itapevi ↔ Amador Bueno | 6.3 km (3.9 mi) | 4 | Commute on this operational extension is free of charge, a fare being required to access the rest of the system on Itapevi station. |

=== Future developments ===
Planned
| Line | Color | Termini | Length | Stations |
|---|---|---|---|---|
| Line 8 | Diamond | Água Branca | —N/a | 1 |
| Line 9 | Emerald (Expansion) | Ceasa ↔ Água Branca | —N/a | 4 |

== See also ==
- Motiva
- Motiva Linha 4
- Motiva Linhas 5 e 17
- Line 8 (CPTM)
- Line 9 (CPTM)
