= Osasco (CPTM) =

Train station in Brazil

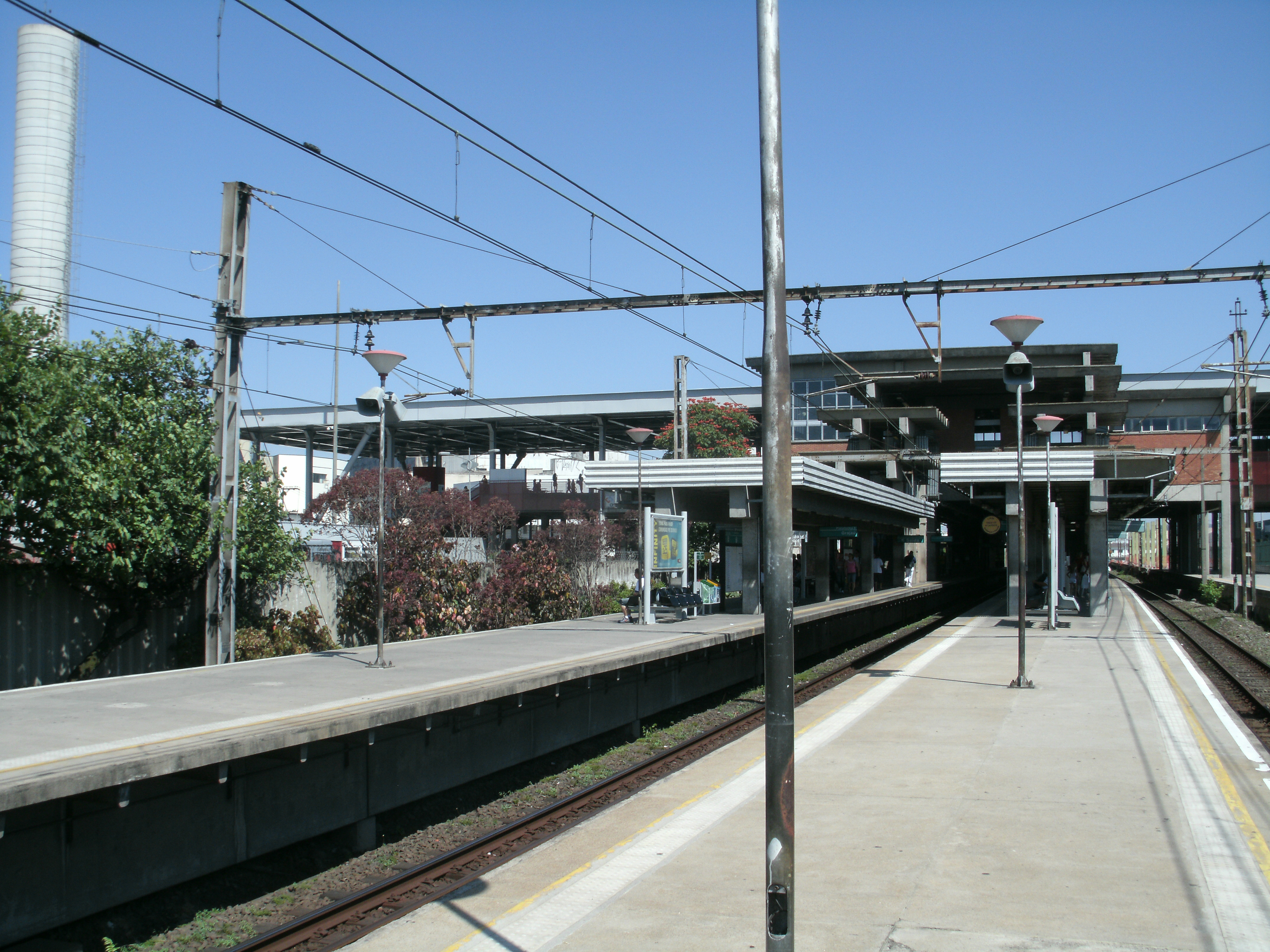
- Platforms on Osasco station.

General information
- Location: Praça Antonio Menck, s/n Centro; Brazil
- Coordinates: 23.536111°S 46.634722°W
- Owner: Government of the State of São Paulo
- Operator: ViaMobilidade Linhas 8 e 9 (Motiva)
- Platforms: 2 Island platforms
- Connections: Osasco Bus Terminal; Osasco Road Terminal

Construction
- Structure type: Surface

Other information
- Station code: OSA

History
- Opened: 20 August 1895; 131 years ago
- Rebuilt: 25 January 1979; 47 years ago

Services
Preceding station	São Paulo Metropolitan Trains	Following station
Comandante Sampaio towards Amador Bueno	Line 8	Presidente Altino towards Júlio Prestes
Terminus	Line 9	Presidente Altino towards Varginha
Track layout
Location

Osasco is a train station on ViaMobilidade Linhas 8 e 9 Lines 8-Diamond and 9-Emerald, located in the city of Osasco.

== History ==
The station was built by Antonio Agù and opened on 20 August 1895 by Estrada de Ferro Sorocabana. Due to the prestige and influence of the Italian immigrant, the station was named after its city, Osasco.

A station is opened by the Kilometer 16, named Osasco, which became necessary for train detours.

— Telegram sent by George Oetterer, superintendent of Estrada de Ferro Sorocabana, on 20 August 1895.

In the 1940s, Cobrasma factory was opened, next to the line. Later, it would provide trains of Fepasa West Line (current CPTM Line 8-Diamond), which circulate until nowadays. In 1960, a new building was built in the station, which became saturated in a short period of time. Meanwhile, the then-neighbourhood of Osasco fought and got its emancipation.

In 1971, Fepasa dissolved Estrada de Ferro Sorocabana and, at the end of that decade, rebuilt most of the West Line stations. Osasco received a new station, opened on 25 January 1979. In the same year, Osasco was chosen as a start point for Fepasa South Line (current CPTM Line 9-Emerald).

In 1996, West and South Lines were transferred to CPTM.
