= Varginha (CPTM) =

Railway station in São Paulo, Brazil

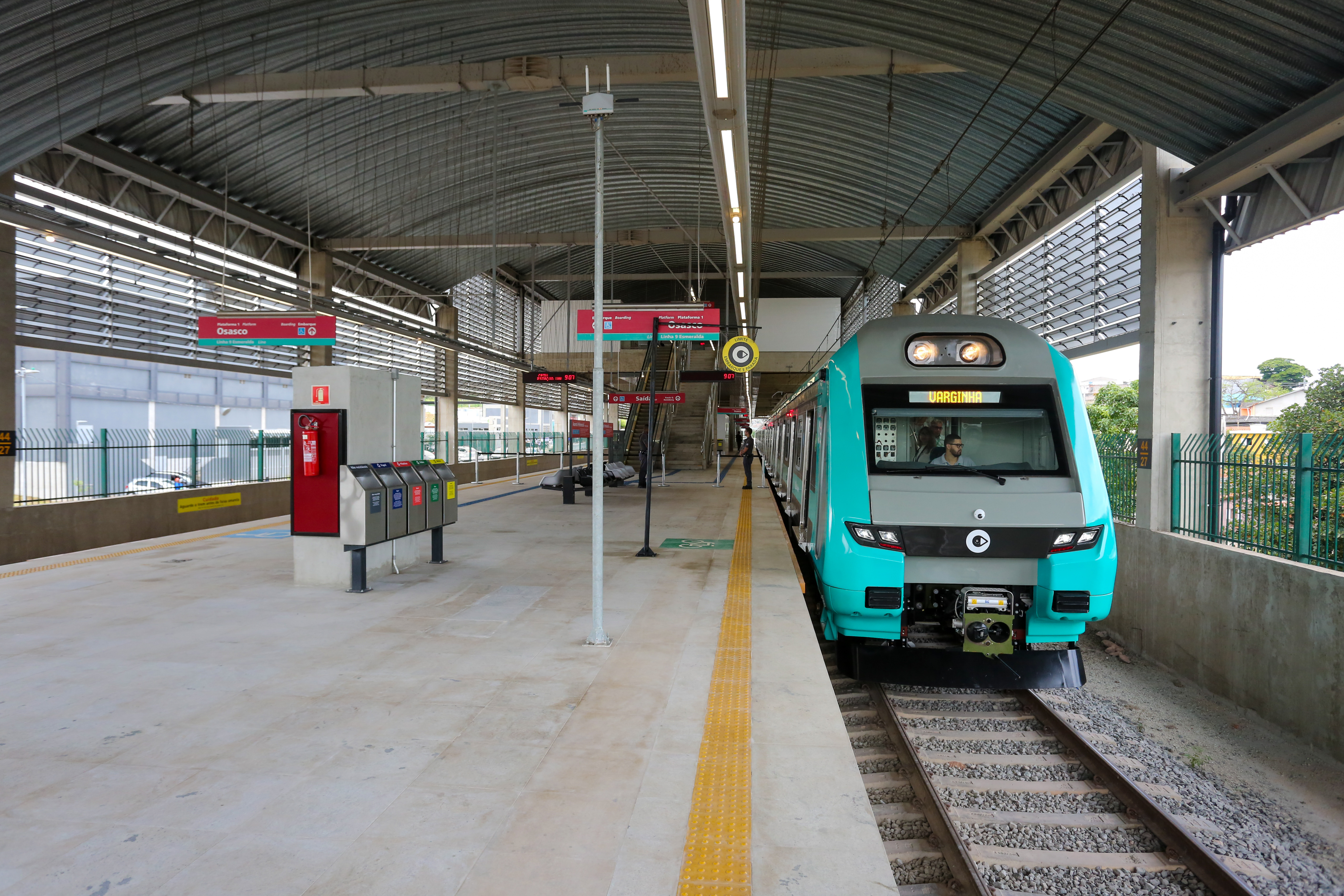

General information
- Location: Av. Paulo G. Reimberg, s/n Grajaú; Brazil
- Coordinates: 23.770833°S 46.711944°W
- Owner: Government of the State of São Paulo
- Operator: ViaMobilidade Linhas 8 e 9 (Motiva)
- Platforms: Side platforms (1992–2001); Island platform (2025)
- Connections: Varginha Bus Terminal

Construction
- Structure type: At-grade

Other information
- Station code: VAG

History
- Opened: 26 September 1996
- Closed: November 2001
- Rebuilt: 27 January 2025

Services
| Preceding station | São Paulo Metropolitan Trains | Following station |
|---|---|---|
| Bruno Covas/Mendes-Vila Natal towards Osasco | Line 9 | Terminus |
Track layout
Location

Varginha is a train station on ViaMobilidade Linhas 8 e 9 Line 9-Emerald, in the district of Grajaú in São Paulo. It is part of a plan of the State Government to extend the Line Emerald in 4.5 kilometres (2.8 mi) towards south of the city, from Grajaú station. It was rebuilt in the place where was located the old Varginha station, which belonged to the Jurubatuba branch, of the extinct FEPASA.

The branch was deactivated by CPTM in November 2001, "due to infrastructure precariousness" of the line at the time, which was not compatible with the rest of the railway, nor with the new administrative policies adopted by the company during that period, as it aimed a "pattern elevation" of the services provided by the company, transforming Line C-Celeste (current Line 9-Emerald), just like other railways transferred to it, from suburban services to metropolitan services. Currently, Line 9 is the only which operates in this model, popularly known as "surface metro", as the railway is completely segregated from external interferences and the trains operate in a less than 5 minutes time between trains.

Before being deactivated by CPTM, the station had an average movement of 30,000 passengers per day.

It was reopened on January 27th 2025.

Besides the station is named Varginha, referencing Jardim Varginha neighbourhood, located southeast of the station, the station building is in southwest of Vila Natal neighbourhood, in the limits with Jardim Guanabara, South Side of São Paulo.

== Demand ==
The station has linear demand for being located inside a residential neighbourhood and serve as a strategic point for the unburdening of the region roads and the Avenida Senador Teotônio Vilela public transportation system and Avenida Paulo Guilguer Reimber, absorbing and distributing great part of the passengers from the districts of Grajaú, Varginha and Parelheiros, having as consequence the unburdening of the passengers flow from the Grajaú Bus Terminal and Varginha Bus Terminal.

Besides that, the station has many public equipments, stores, and commercial ventures in its surroundings, such as UBS (Basic Unit of Health) Chácara do Conde, AMA/UBS Jardim Campinas, Holy Trinity Parish, E.M.E.I (Municipal Elementary School) Maria Eugenia Fakhoury, E.M.E.F. (Municipal Middle School) Prof. Eliza Rachel Macedo de Souza, besides many popular restaurants and supermarkets through Av. Paulo G. Reimberg and region.

== Characteristics ==
=== 1992 Varginha station ===
Surface station with two adjacent tracks in metric gauge and one side platform in west to the station. Platform structure built temporarily in wood and partially covered in a structure made of the same material.

The station had an auxiliary building at the end of the platform with public telephones (orelhão) and buffer stops, made of concrete, in the end of the main track, avoiding a runaway train derail from the tracks and invade the level crossing, in front of the station.

=== 2025 Varginha station ===
The station is located in a confluence by the number 1000, between Avenida Paulo Guilguer Reimber and Rua Oregon, southwest from Vila Natal. Besides Varginha station, a new urban bus terminal will be built under the SPTrans responsibility. The new terminal will be in the same place of the current one, located by the end of the avenue, which is currently saturated due to the high demand of passengers from nearby districts. Because of that, Avenida Paulo Guilguer Reimber will be duplicated by the Prefecture to allow the bus flow from Avenida Senador Teotônio Vilela, reducing the current overflow in the region.

After Varginha station, there are 700 metres (2,300 ft) of track, used as train parking and start point for a possible extension to the district of Parelheiros.

The implantation of the new signaling system and train control (TCS - Traffic Control System) will be under the responsibility of the infrastructure company Alstom.

Iron: 3,000 tonnes (3,000 long tons)
Concrete: 8,000 square metres (86,000 sq ft)
Metallic structure: 451 tonnes (444 long tons)
Station extension: 2,100 square metres (23,000 sq ft)
Total area: 15,000 square metres (160,000 sq ft)
