= Museum of Sacred Art of São Paulo =

Museum in São Paulo, Brazil

- Museu de Arte Sacra de São Paulo
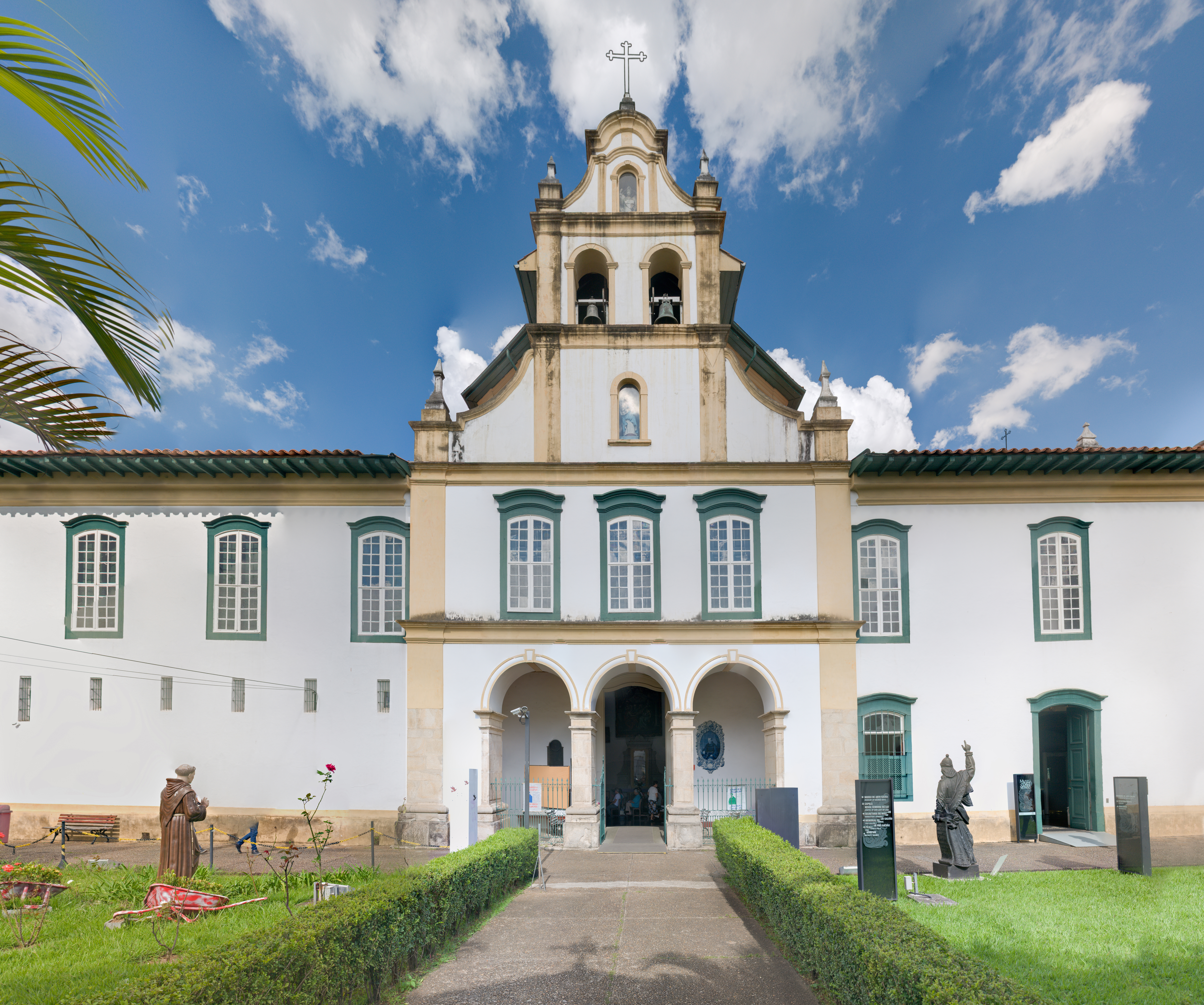
- Sacred Art Museum of São Paulo

- Location of São Paulo Museum of Sacred Art in São Paulo Museum of Sacred Art of São Paulo (Brazil)
- Former name: Museum of the Curia
- Established: 18 June 1970
- Location: São Paulo, Brazil
- Coordinates: 23.530261°S 46.631298°W
- Directors: José Carlos Marçal de Barros, Maria Inês Lopes Coutinho e Luiz Henrique Marcon Neves
- Public transit access: Tiradentes
- Website: www.museuartesacra.org.br

The Museum of Sacred Art of São Paulo (Portuguese: Museu de Arte Sacra de São Paulo) a museum dedicated to the collection and display of sacred art of Brazil. It is located in the Luz neighborhood of São Paulo in the left wing of the Luz Monastery, a religious institution founded in 1774 by Frei Galvão. The monastery is the only colonial building of the eighteenth century in São Paulo to preserve its original building elements, materials and structure. The monastery was listed as an architectural monument of national importance in 1943 by the National Institute of Historic and Artistic Heritage (IPHAN) and subsequently by the State of São Paulo Council for the Defense of the Historical, Archaeological, Artistic and Touristic Heritage (CONDEPHAAT).

The museum was founded in 1970 and is maintained jointly by the State Government of São Paulo and the Archdiocese of São Paulo. The collection includes Brazilian and foreign works sacred works dating from the sixteenth century, and includes works by noted artists such as Aleijadinho, Agostinho da Piedade, Agostinho de Jesus, Valentim da Fonseca e Silva, Manoel da Costa Ataíde, Almeida Júnior, and Benedito Calixto.

== Museum of the Curia ==
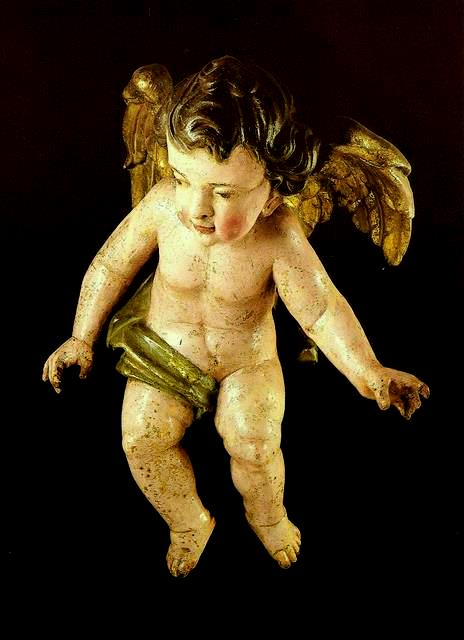
Valentim da Fonseca e Silva (ca. 1750–1813) Anjo, 18th century

The collection of the Museum of Sacred Art of São Paulo began early in the early twentieth century on the initiative of Dom Duarte Leopoldo e Silva (1867-1938), the first archbishop of São Paulo. He was responsible for the distribution of sacred works during the demolition of the São Paulo Cathedral in 1911 for the construction of the present cathedral. Dom Duarte distributed the sacred works to various churches throughout the greater São Paulo area with the goal of bringing the collection together into a unified collection at a later date. The archdiocese opened the Museum of the Curia (O Museu da Cúria) in 1907, and the collection grew over the 20th century.

== Foundation and opening ==
The Curia Museum continued to collect pieces during the period of demolition and rebuilding of several churches from the state São Paulo during first half of the twentieth century. The collection was kept in a room in the Curia on Rua Santa Teresa. In 1969, when Abreu Sodre was governor of São Paulo, the Secretary of Finance, Luis Arrobas Martins, engaged in the creation and consolidation of a network of cultural facilities in the state. He began negotiations with Cardinal Agnelo Rossi (1913-1995) aiming at the creation of the São Paulo Museum of Sacred Art. An agreement for the merger of the existing collection of the Curia and similar collections of sacred art owned by the state government was signed on October 28, 1969. The agreement between the government and the Archdiocese was approved at the same time as the restoration work of the Luz Monastery by IPHAN. The museum opened to the public on June 29, 1970.

The initial collection was joined by other works of sacred pieces acquired by private collectors such as Luis Arrobas Martins (1920-1977), Pietro Maria Bardi (1900-1999), and Ciccillo Matarazzo (1898-1977). The Luz Monastery underwent another makeover in the 1970s under the direction of CONDEPHAAT to restore its appearance to that of the early eighteenth century. It is now considered the most outstanding work of colonial architecture that remains in the São Paulo metropolitan area. Antonio de Oliveira Godinho (1920-1992) became director of the museum in 1979 and fundamentally reshaped the profile and display of the collection. The newly elected Pope John Paul II visited the museum in the same year.

== See also ==
- UNASP São Paulo Memory Center (Adventist University Center of São Paulo museum)

== Bibliography ==
- Museu de Arte Sacra de São Paulo (1971). Catálogo do Museu de Arte Sacra de São Paulo (in Portuguese). São Paulo: Museu de Arte Sacra de São Paulo.
