= Adventist University Center of São Paulo =

Education institute in Brazil

- Centro Universitário Adventista de São Paulo
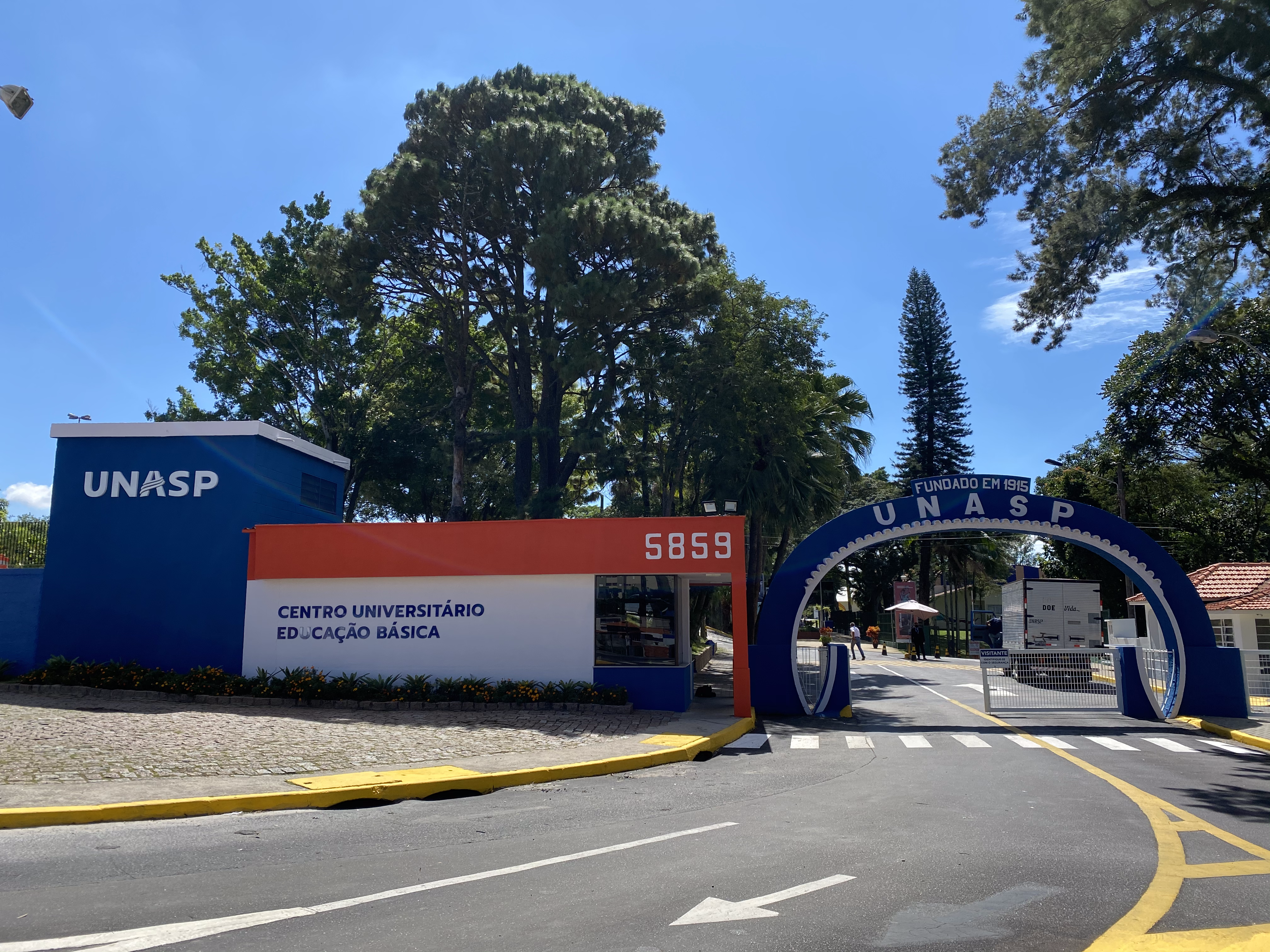
- Motto: Educate and serve
- Type: Private and confessional
- Established: May 6, 1915; 110 years ago
- Religious affiliation: Seventh-day Adventist education
- Chancellor: Euler Pereira Bahia
- Rector: Martin Kuhn
- Location: São Paulo, São Paulo (state) (Headquarters); 23°39′59″S 46°46′59″W
- Website: unasp.br

The Adventist University Center of São Paulo (Portuguese: Centro Universitário Adventista de São Paulo), also known as UNASP, is a basic and higher education institution that integrates the Seventh-day Adventist education system. It has 3 campuses in the state of São Paulo: São Paulo (headquarters), Engenheiro Coelho, and Hortolândia. It also runs an application center in Artur Nogueira and offers distance education.

It dates back to the end of the 19th century when the first theological training course was launched. The first departments beyond theology were established in the 1960s and 1970s. In 1999, it became a university center.

== History ==
=== Formation of mission schools ===
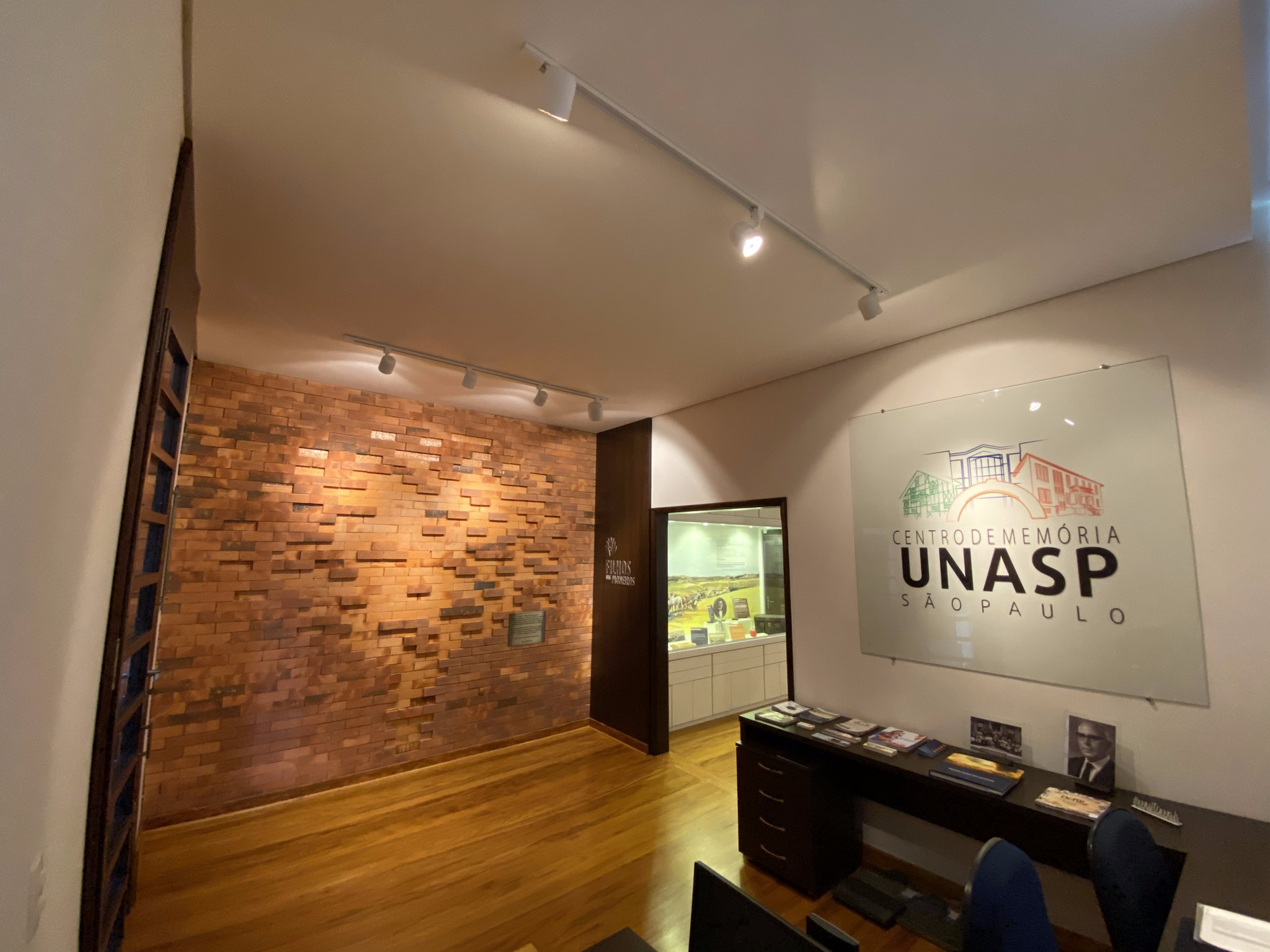
Entrance to the UNASP São Paulo Memory Center.

Adventist education in Brazil began in the southern region at the end of the 19th century. At the time, the leadership of the Seventh-day Adventist Church (SDA) created the first elementary schools in the cities of Curitiba and Gaspar to support the development of Adventist work in Brazil. Faced with expansion, the SDA decided to establish a preparatory school to train the future leaders and missionaries of the church who would serve throughout Brazil.

On October 15, 1897, the first SDA school was founded in the city of Gaspar Alto under the name Colégio Internacional de Gaspar Alto (English: Gaspar Alto International School). On August 19, 1903, on the recommendation of the SDA, the college was transferred to Taquari with the name Colégio Superior de Taquari (Taquari High School). In 1904, John Lipke assumed the directorship and in 1910, the institution closed.

=== Establishment in Santo Amaro ===
The property of the Colégio Superior de Taquari was sold by the Adventist Church of Rio Grande do Sul for Rs$11, which would be used to find a new school. On April 28, 1915, the Association of Seventh-day Adventists in Brazil purchased a 145-hectare property in the district of Capão Redondo, in São Paulo, for Rs$20. On May 6, 1915, the area was occupied and activities began. Tents were assembled to provide the missionaries and students with a place to sleep, eat and store materials until the first building was constructed.

On July 3, 1915, classes began in improvised structures with 12 students. On August 1, 1915, the cornerstone was laid for the first building of the Colégio da União Conferência Brasileira dos Adventistas do Sétimo Dia (Brazilian Conference of Seventh-day Adventists Union School). It had John Lipke as headmaster, John Boehm as manager and Paulo Hening and Augusta Boehm as teachers. In 1922, the school celebrated the first graduation with nine students from the ministerial and normal courses.

From 1925, the school's management invested in an agro-industrial boarding school with the breeding of Dutch dairy cattle imported from the United States. In 1932, it began producing juices and whole foods, which later became the Superbom food company. In 1937, the high school was formalized and in 1942, it received the name Colégio Adventista Brasileiro (Brazilian Adventist School - CAB). Between the 1940s and 1960s, the main secondary-technical courses were made official.

=== Creation of departments and institutes ===
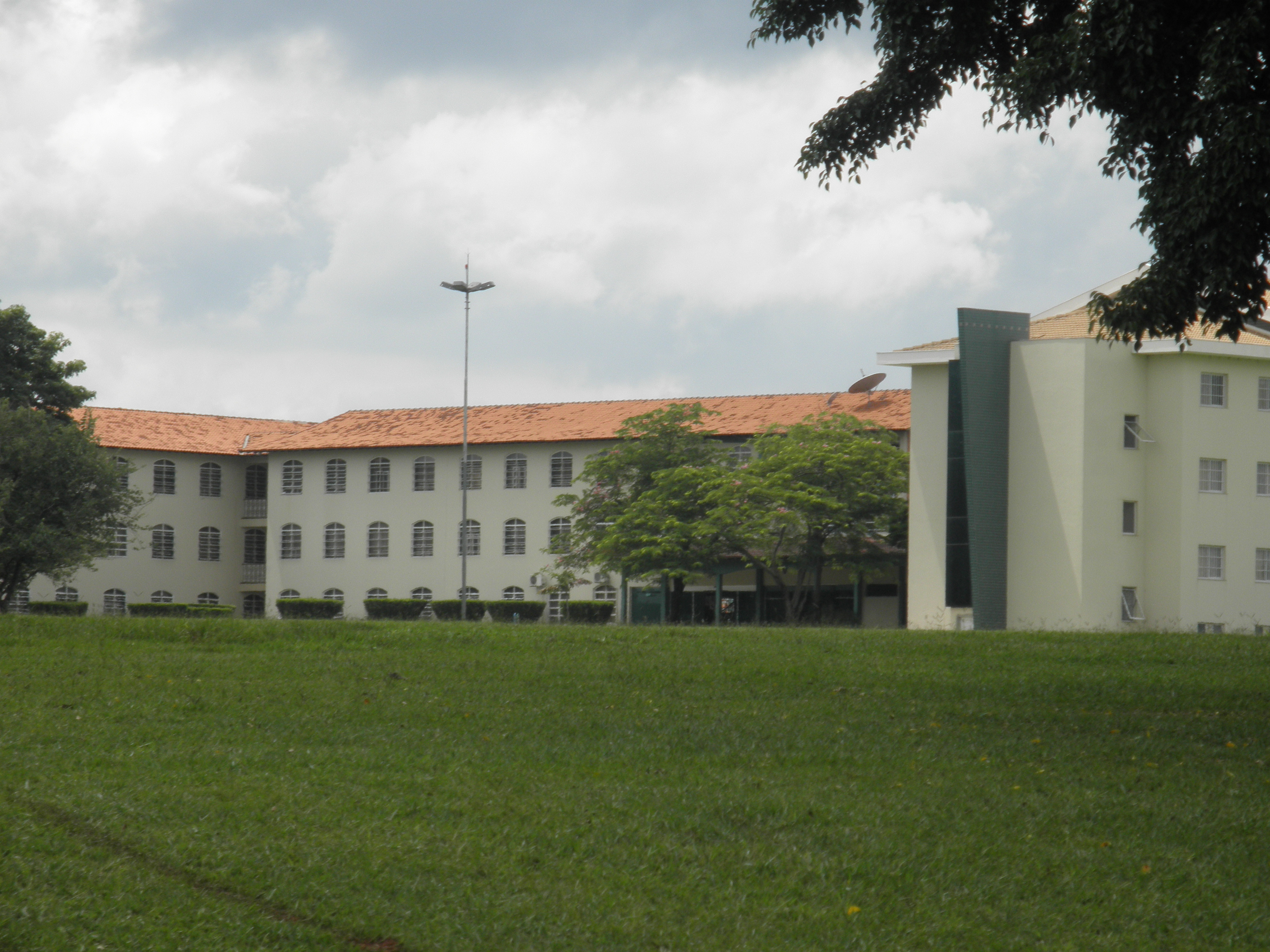
Buildings of the UNASP Engenheiro Coelho campus in 2014.

In 1940, the General Conference of Seventh-day Adventists authorized the creation of a nursing course in Brazil. However, the difficulties of forming a teaching staff delayed the launch of the course until 1943, when it began classes on the premises of the Casa de Saúde Liberdade (now the São Paulo Adventist Hospital). The first class graduated in 1945. At the time, the course lacked organization and was not part of a faculty.

In 1950, new structures were built in Capão Redondo to include the nursing course, which would be relocated there. In 1962, the Colégio Adventista Brasileiro was renamed the Instituto Adventista de Ensino (Adventist Educational Institute - IAE) to accommodate the different programs planned. On May 30, 1968, the Faculdade Adventista de Enfermagem (Adventist Faculty of Nursing - FAE) was authorized to operate by Decree No. 62,800 issued by the National Education Council (CNE).

In 1971, the SDA in São Paulo started a pedagogy course linked to the Faculty of Theology in order to train teachers for the Adventist schools that existed in Brazil. In 1973, through Decree No. 72.610, the Faculdade Adventista de Educação (Adventist Faculty of Education - FAEd) was authorized to operate legally. The IAE Deliberative Council voted in favor of converting the IAE into the Universidade Adventista do Brasil (Adventist University of Brazil - UAB/UNABRA), but the project fell through.

=== Expansion ===
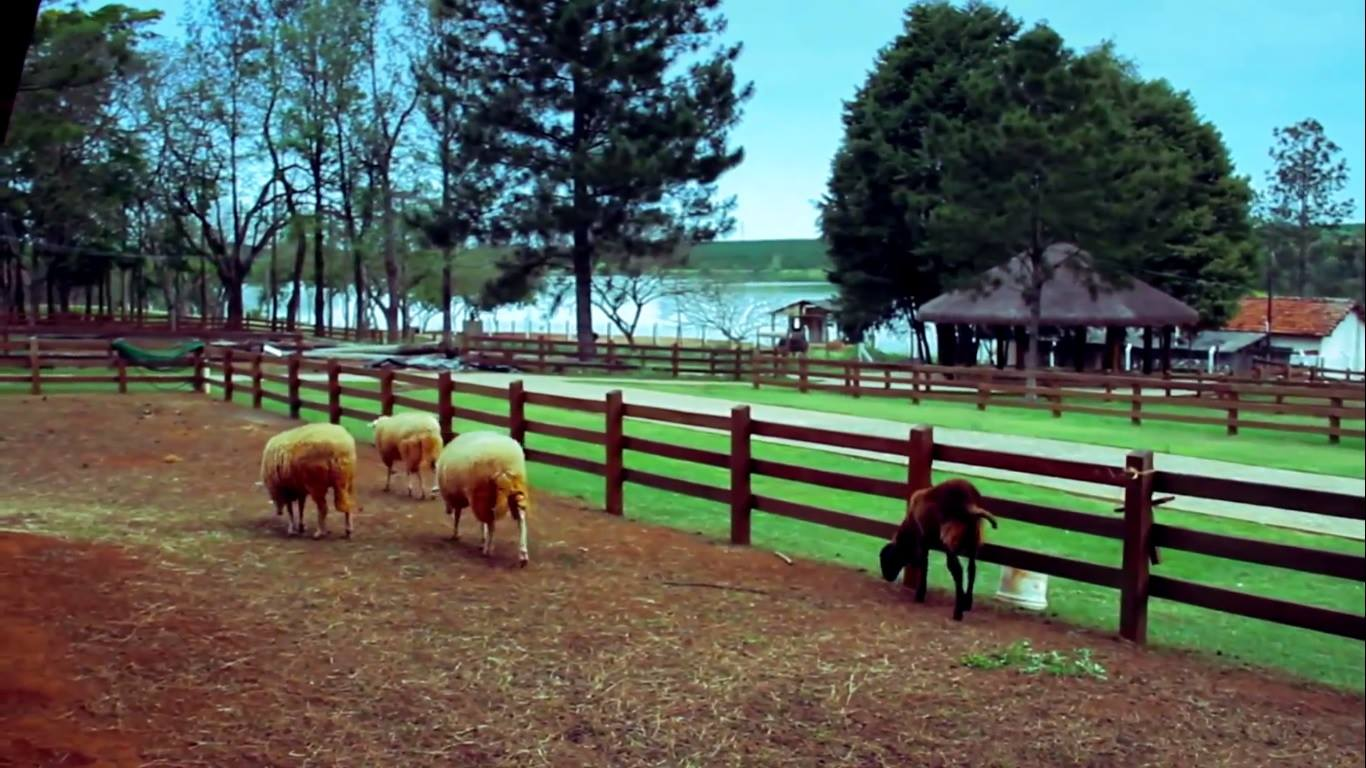
UNASP Engenheiro Coelho campus farm in 2015.

In 1979, São Paulo City Hall expropriated the IAE area (currently the São Paulo campus) and reduced the size of the land by 80%. In 1983, the Adventist Church bought a farm in Engenheiro Coelho to create the "new IAE". The São Paulo campus began to offer courses in the areas of Exact, Natural and Health Sciences, while the Engenheiro Coelho campus focused on the areas of Theology, Humanities and Technology. Between 1988 and 1989, new higher education courses were introduced, and between 1997 and 2007, they were expanded.

=== Elevation to university center ===
In 1992, the institution considered the possibility of converting it into a university, but did not get a response from the National Education Council (CNE). Since then, the SDA leadership dedicated efforts to the project of a university center. On September 9, 1999, the Ministry of Education authorized the operation of the Centro Universitário Adventista de São Paulo (Adventist University Center of São Paulo - UNASP), which is maintained by the Seventh-day Adventist Network.

In 2002, the Seventh-day Adventist Network incorporated the Instituto Adventista São Paulo (Adventist Institute São Paulo - IASP), founded in 1949 in Hortolândia, which covered elementary and higher education through the Faculdade Adventista de Hortolândia (Adventist College of Hortolândia). UNASP was recognized by the National Council of Education (CNE) through Ordinance No. 1,655 of June 3, 2004. In 2018, UNASP was composed of the São Paulo, Engenheiro Coelho and Hortolândia campuses.

== Campuses ==
=== City of São Paulo ===
It offers courses in Administration, Systems Analysis and Development, Architecture and Urbanism, Computer Science, Accounting, Law, Physical Education, Nursing, Computer Engineering, Physiotherapy, Gastronomy, Nutrition, Pedagogy, Psychology, and Advertising.

=== Hortolândia ===
It offers degrees in Administration, Accounting, Law, Physical Education, Nursing, Computer Engineering, Psychology, Advertising, and Information Systems.

=== Engenheiro Coelho ===
It offers degrees in Administration, Architecture and Urbanism, Accounting, Law, Agronomic Engineering, Civil Engineering, Computer Engineering, Production Engineering, Journalism, Literature (English and Portuguese), Veterinary Medicine, Music, Pedagogy, Psychology, Advertising, Radio and TV, Theology, Translator, and Interpreter.

== Teaching, research and extension ==
UNASP has 55 courses, 36 of which are bachelor's degrees, 3 technologists and 16 undergraduate degrees. It also has 82 postgraduate courses, 80 of which are only lato sensu and two stricto sensu courses, which are aimed at professionalization. There is not even a stricto sensu academic course in theology, the oldest of the teaching offerings at UNASP. The lack of these academic master's and doctorate courses naturally lowers the institution's score in several aspects of research, a crucial factor for the full transformation of the university center into a university.

It has programs focused on Outpatient Nutrition Care, Care for the Elderly in Asylums, Children's Shelters, Adult Literacy, Digital Literacy for the Visually Impaired, and Digital Literacy for the Elderly. It also operates four primary and secondary education institutions that support the teaching of pedagogy and undergraduate degrees:

- Colégio UNASP Artur Nogueira (UNASP Artur Nogueira School);
- Colégio UNASP Engenheiro Coelho (UNASP Engenheiro Coelho School);
- Colégio UNASP Hortolândia (UNASP Hortolândia School);
- Colégio UNASP São Paulo (UNASP São Paulo School).

== Gallery ==
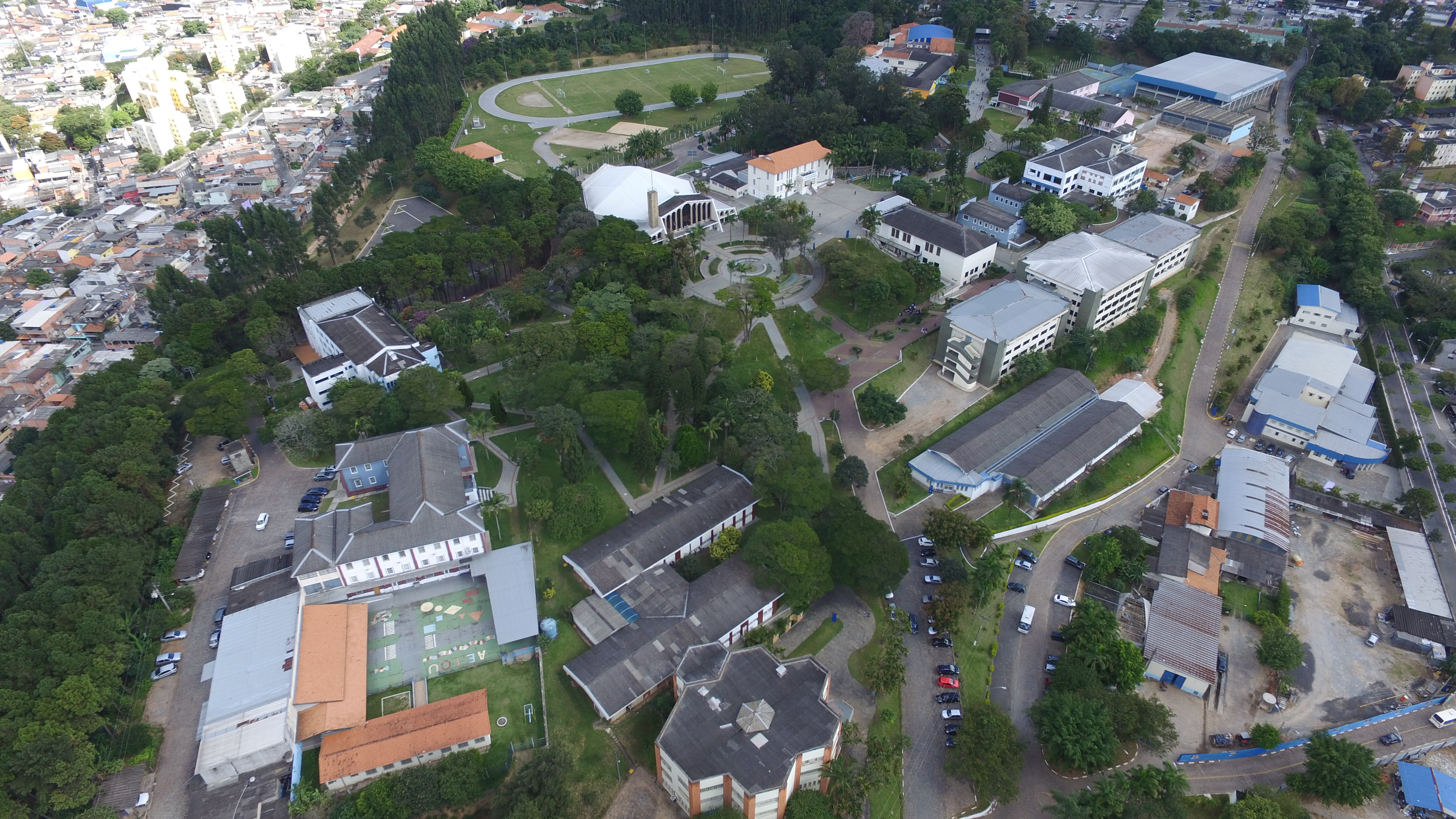
Aerial view of the São Paulo campus

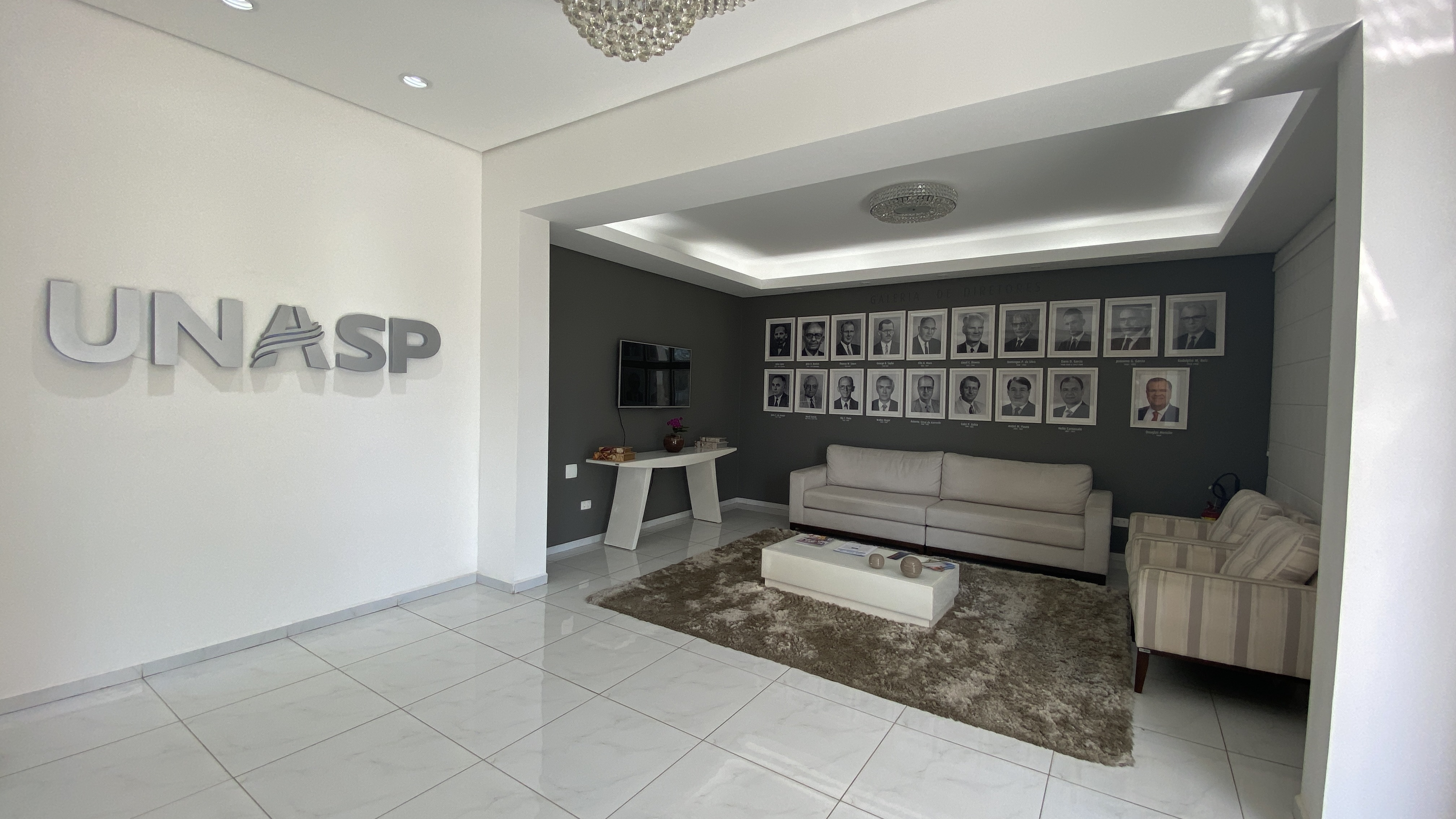
UNASP São Paulo administrative building.

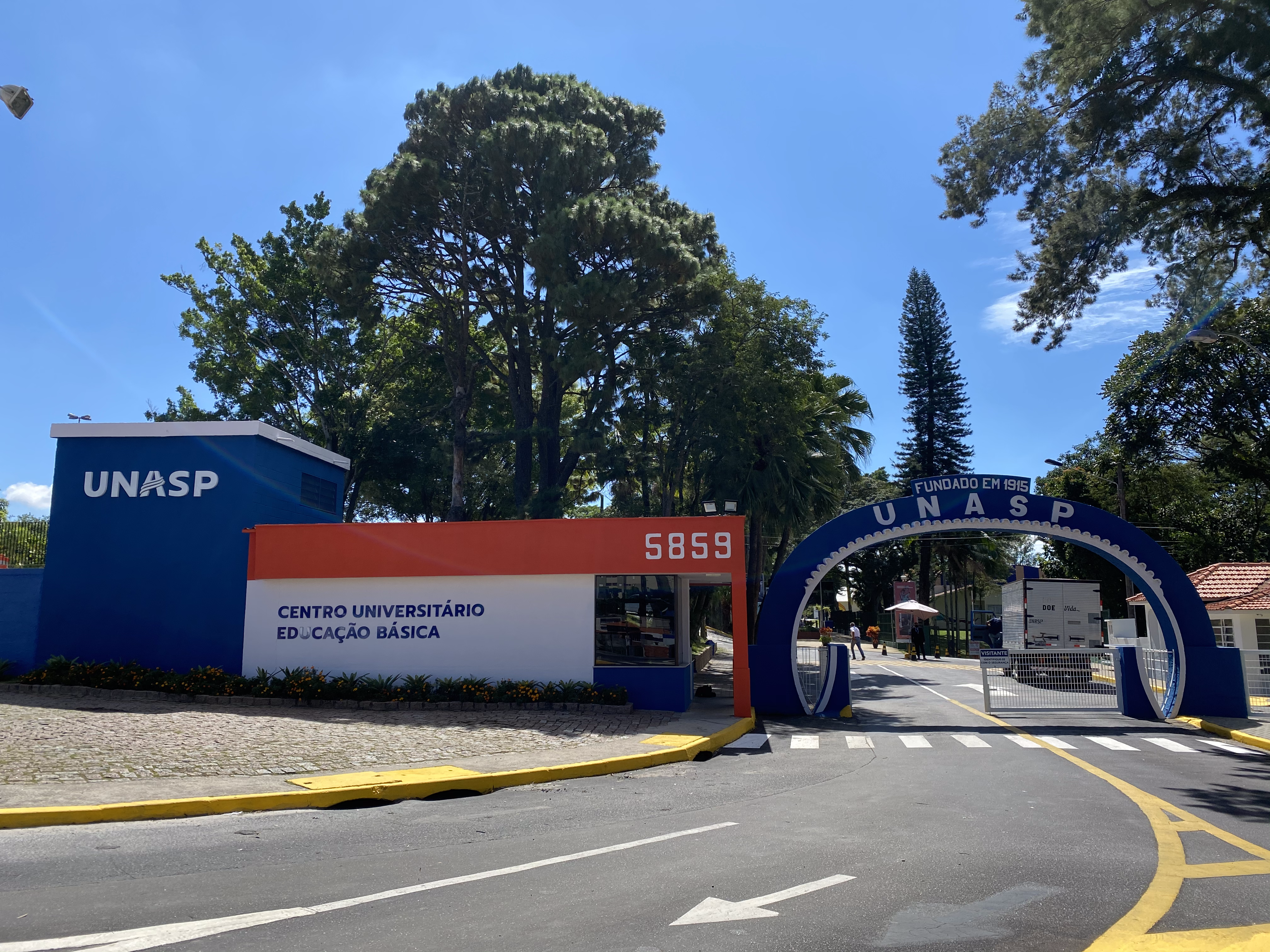
UNASP São Paulo facade.

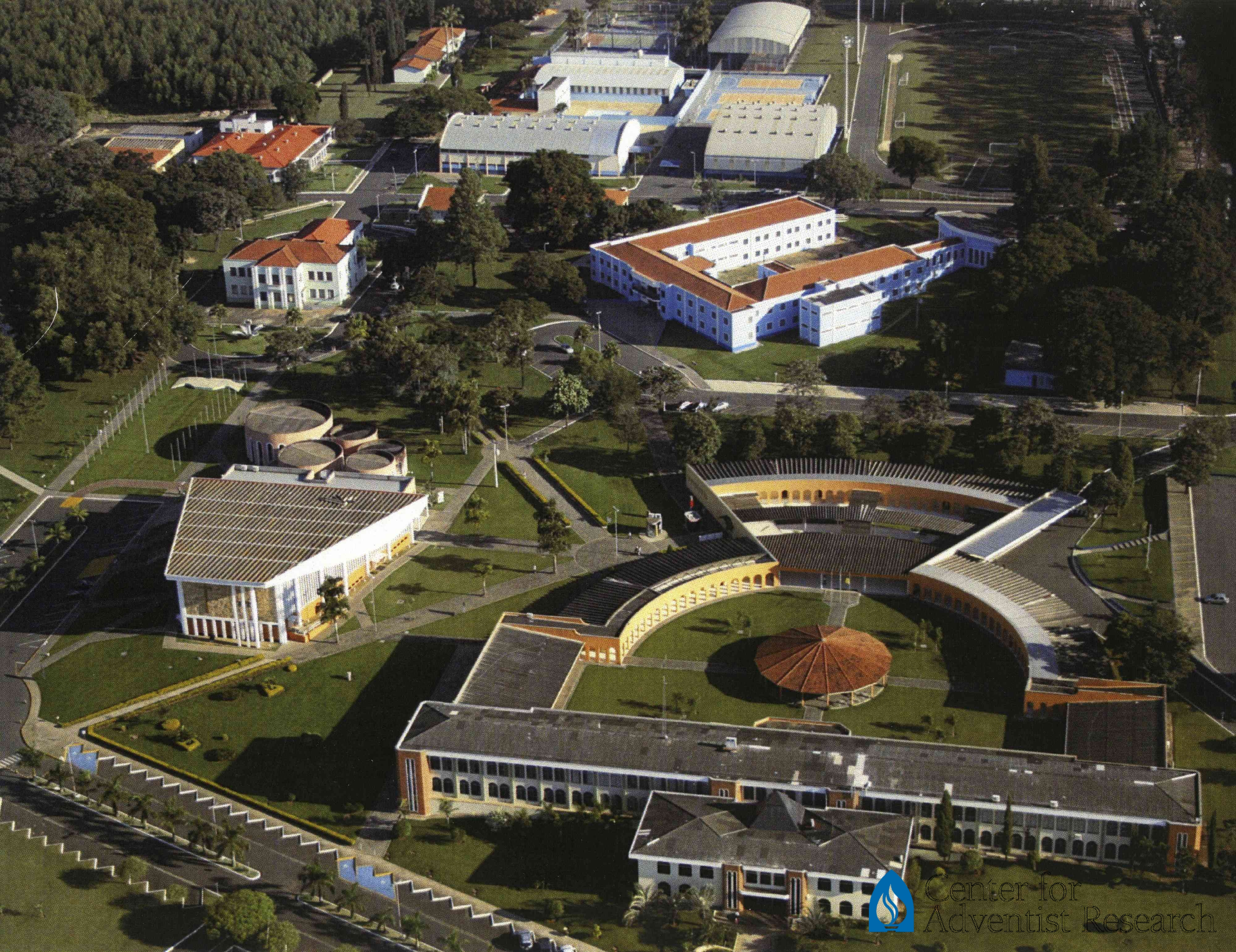
Aerial view of the Hortolândia campus.

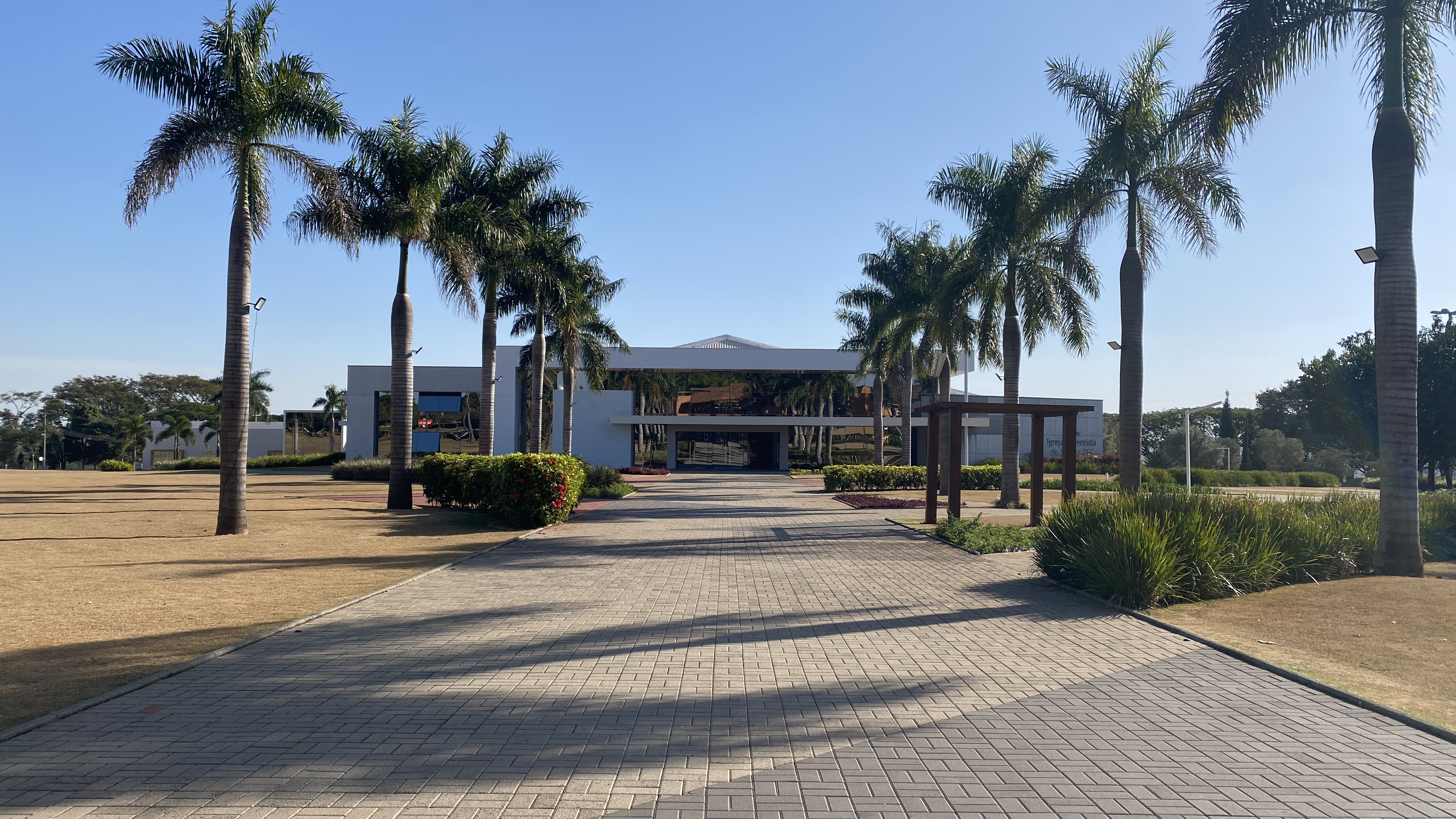
UNASP Engenheiro Coelho temple.

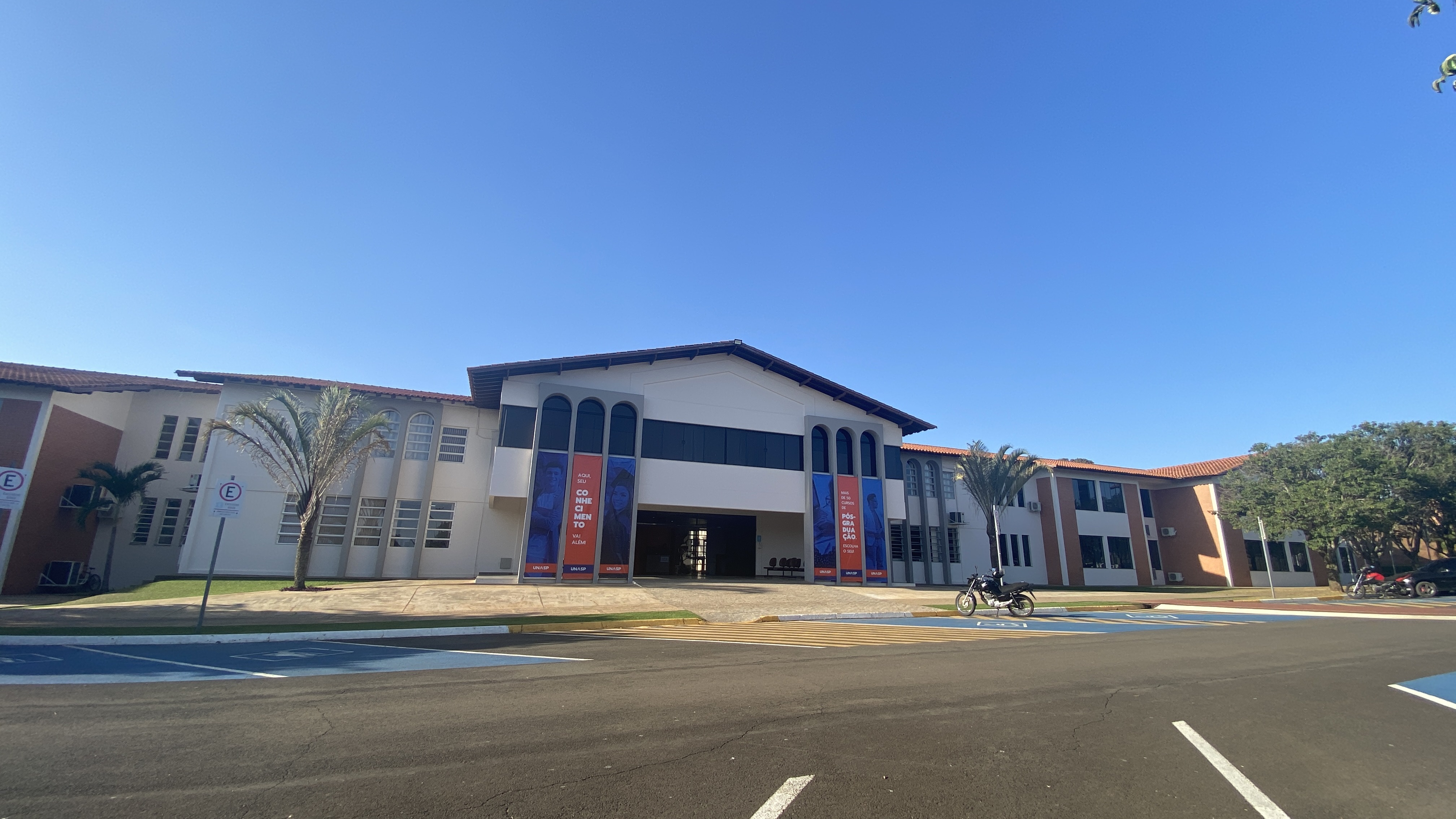
UNASP Engenheiro Coelho classroom building.

== See also ==
- Seventh-day Adventist education
- UNASP São Paulo Memory Center
