= Engenheiro Coelho =

Municipality in the state of São Paulo in Brazil

- Municipality
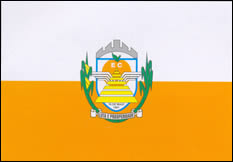
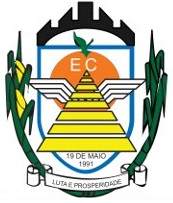
- Flag Coat of arms

- Location in São Paulo state

- Location in Brazil
- Coordinates: 22°29′18″S 47°12′54″W
- Country: Brazil
- Region: Southeast Brazil
- State: São Paulo
- Metropolitan Region: Campinas

Government
  - Prefect: Pedro Franco de Oliveira (2017 – 2020) (PMDB)

Area
  - Total: 109.94 km^{2} (42.45 sq mi)
- Elevation: 655 m (2,149 ft)

Population (2020)
  - Total: 21,249
  - Density: 193.28/km^{2} (500.59/sq mi)
- Time zone: UTC−3 (BRT)
- Postal code: 13165-000
- Phone code: 19

Engenheiro Coelho is a municipality in the east of the State of São Paulo, Brazil. It is part of the Metropolitan Region of Campinas. The population is 21,249 (2020 est.) in an area of 109.94 km^{2} (42.45 sq mi). It is located about 158 km (98 mi) from São Paulo and 900 km (560 mi) from Brasília. Engenheiro Coelho was founded on May 19, 1991, from a rural community, therefore, it has kept an agricultural economy mainly based on the cultivation of orange, sugarcane, and cassava.

== Education ==
- UNASP (Adventist University of São Paulo), which offers many courses from Elementary School to University.

== Media ==
In telecommunications, the city was served by Telecomunicações de São Paulo. In July 1998, this company was acquired by Telefónica, which adopted the Vivo brand in 2012. The company is currently an operator of cell phones, fixed lines, internet (fiber optics/4G) and television (satellite and cable).

== Religion ==
Christianity is present in the city as follows:

=== Catholic Church ===
The Catholic church in the municipality is part of the Roman Catholic Diocese of Limeira.

=== Protestant Church ===
The most diverse evangelical beliefs are present in the city, mainly Pentecostal, including the Assemblies of God in Brazil (the largest evangelical church in the country), Christian Congregation in Brazil, among others. These denominations are growing more and more throughout Brazil.

== See also ==
- List of municipalities in São Paulo
- Interior of São Paulo
