= Passeio Público (Rio de Janeiro) =

Park in Rio de Janeiro, Brazil

Coordinates: 22°54′49.67″S 43°10′33.55″W

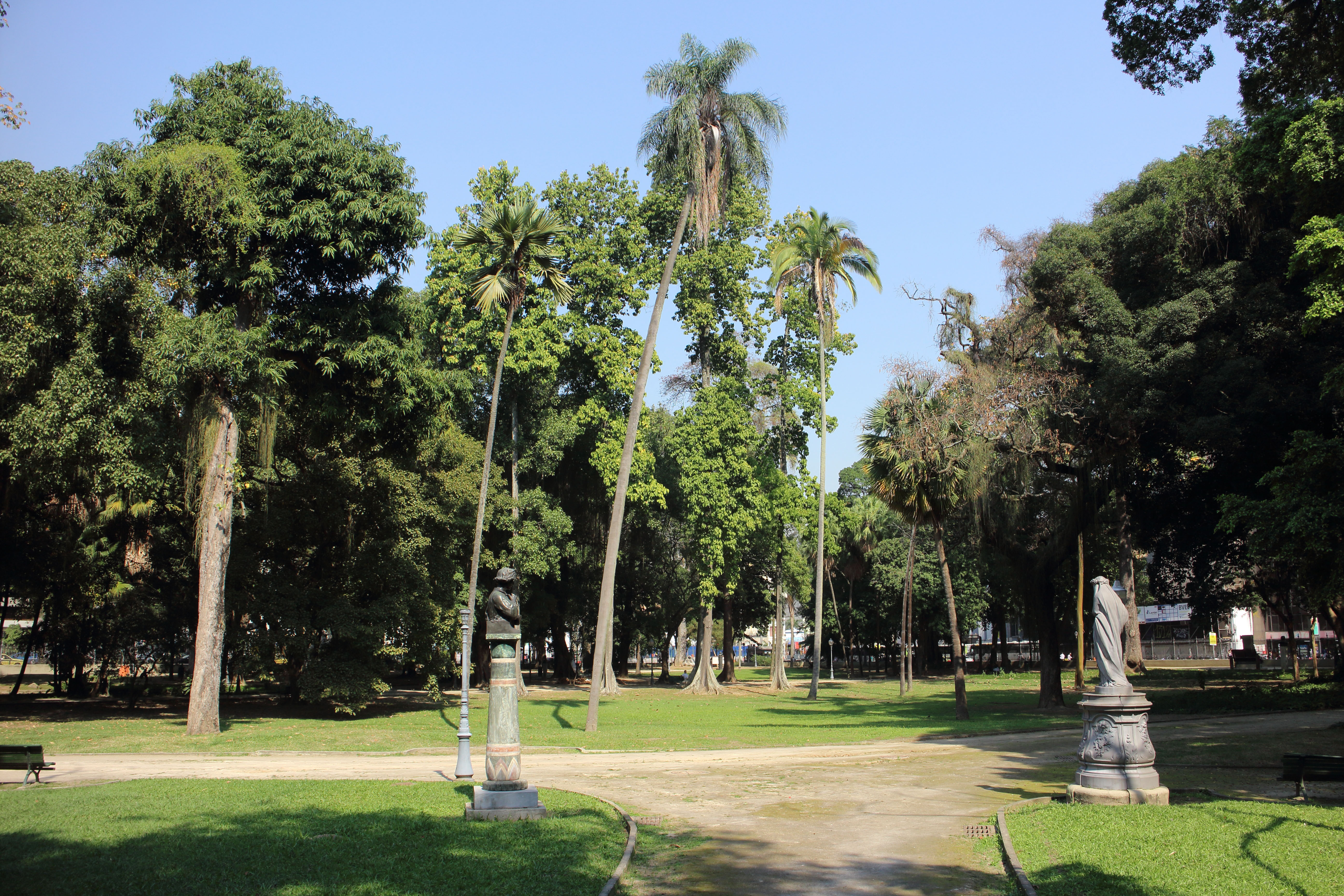

- Location within Rio de Janeiro
- Type: Public park
- Location: Rio de Janeiro, Brazil
- Created: 1779

National Historic Heritage of Brazil
- Designated: 99/6
- Reference no.: 1938

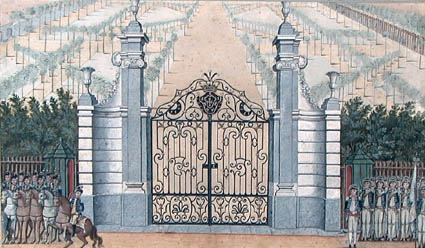
18th-century painting showing the entrance of the Passeio Público.

The Passeio Público is a public park in the historic centre of Rio de Janeiro, Brazil. Built after 1779, it is the oldest public park of Brazil and one of the oldest in the Americas.

== History ==
In 1763, the seat of government of colonial Brazil was transferred from Salvador de Bahia to the city of Rio de Janeiro. Among other improvements in the new colonial capital, Viceroy Luís de Vasconcelos had the idea of creating a public park in the capital of the colony, inspired by the Passeio Público (Public Park) created in the 1760s in Lisbon, as well as the Baroque-Rococo garden of the Royal Palace of Queluz. Thus, in 1779 the Viceroy commissioned the building of the park to Valentim da Fonseca e Silva (Master Valentim), the main sculptor and urban planner of Rio at the time and an active collaborator of the Viceroy. The works would be completed in 1783.

The park was built on land reclaimed from a lagoon located beside the Guanabara Bay. This lagoon — known as Lagoa do Boqueirão — was polluted and bred diseases, and its elimination was considered a major improvement in the urban conditions of Rio.

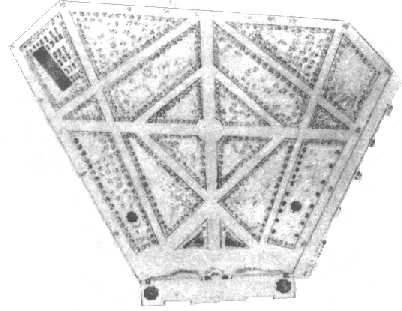
1862 drawing showing the Master Valentim's design of the Passeio Público

=== Original design ===
Master Valentim planned a park in the French formal garden style, in the shape of an irregular hexagon, using straight pathways arranged in a geometrical and symmetrical form. By the sea, the park had a terrace from which wonderful views of Guanabara Bay could be enjoyed. This terrace also had two pavilions decorated with paintings. Master Valentim decorated the park with various species of trees, as well as fountains and statues.

The park was originally encircled by a stone wall and was mostly used by Rio's high colonial society, but after 1793 it was opened to the general public.

=== Decoration ===
The beautiful iron gate at the entrance of the park, in Rococo style, is still in its original place and carries the effigies of Queen Mary I of Portugal and the King consort, Pedro III, with the Latin inscription Maria Iª et Petrus III Brasiliae Regibus 1783.

Inside the park, Master Valentim built two fountains positioned back to back and collectively known as the Fonte dos Amores (Love Fountain). One face of the fountain (the Fonte dos Jacarés, Caiman Fountain) had a basin decorated with plants and bronze statues of caimans, a bronze coconut tree, and egrets from whose beaks the water flowed. Unfortunately the tree and the birds have been lost, but the two intertwined caimans are still in place. At the back of this fountain, facing the sea, is located the Fonte do Menino (Boy's Fountain), which had the coat of arms of the Viceroy Vasconcelos, vases and a bronze statue of a boy holding a turtle. Water flowed from the mouth of the turtle to a basin. This statue was stolen and later replaced by one with a different design.

The bronze statues of Master Valentim were the first to be cast in Rio, and are a precocious representation of autochthonous fauna (caimans, egrets), which would become widespread in the Romantic Brazilian art of the 19th century.

In 1806, Master Valentim added the final touch to the park — two granite pyramids with medallions made of Portuguese Lioz stone, one with the inscription Saudade do Rio (Nostalgia for Rio) and the other Ao Amor do Público (To the Love of the People).

Between 1785 and 1790, the pavilions of the Passeio Público were decorated with oval paintings by one of Master Valentim's collaborators, the painter Leandro Joaquim. The oval paintings were among the first landscape paintings produced in Brazil and show various views of Guanabara Bay. Six of these paintings have survived and are now in the Museu Nacional de Belas Artes and the Museu Histórico Nacional.

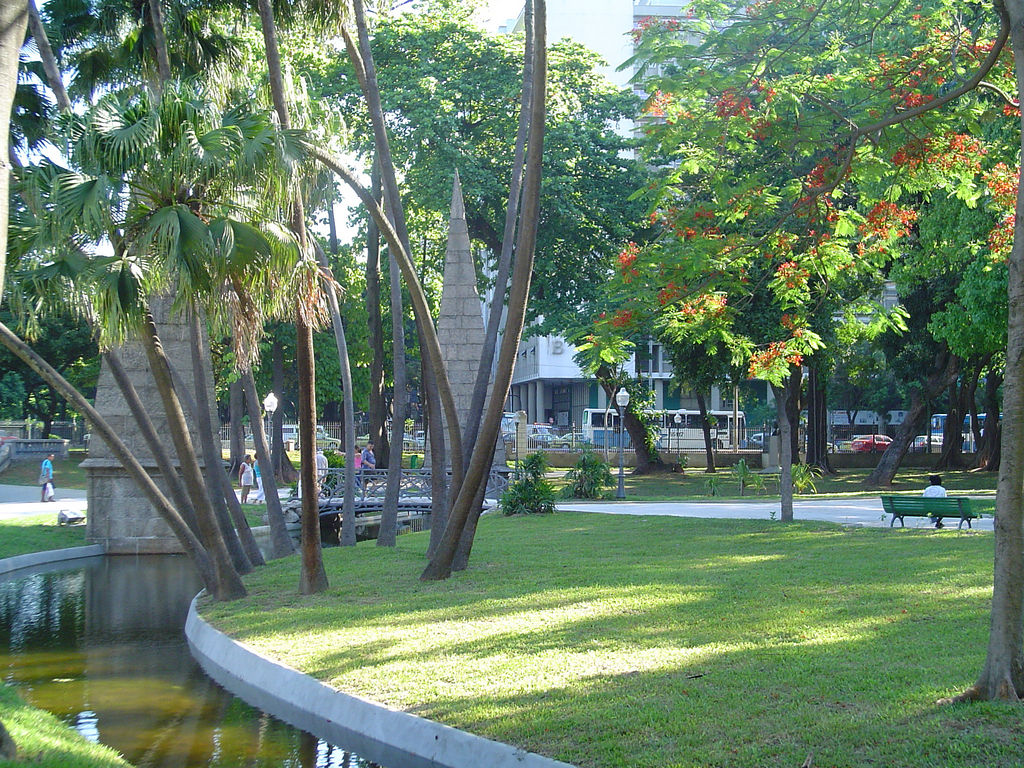
View of the Passeio Público with its decorative granite pyramids

=== The Glaziou Reform ===
In 1864, French landscape designer Auguste François Marie Glaziou was commissioned to modernise the old park. Glaziou greatly altered the original design by Valentim, following the English Garden style, which attempts to recreate a 'natural' landscape. The geometrical arrangement of the Passeio Público gave way to a labyrinth of winding pathways, with a lake, bridge and different plant species. He kept, however, the sculptural work by Valentim — the fountains, gate and pyramids.

=== Decline and renewal ===
During the 20th century, various commemorative busts dedicated to Brazilian personalities were placed in the Passeio Público, including one bust of Master Valentim, inaugurated in 1912.

A series of land reclaimings nearby led the park to get far from the sea and lose its view of Guanabara Bay — greatly altering the original intention of the park. The terrace was modified in the 1920s when the Cassino building (actually a theatre) was built in its place. The Cassino was later demolished.

During a great part of the 20th century, the Passeio Público — and the whole historical centre of Rio — fell into decay. This situation was reversed when the park finally went through a careful and extensive renovation, carried out between 2001 and 2004 by the city's municipal government.
