= Valentim da Fonseca e Silva =

Brazilian architect and artist

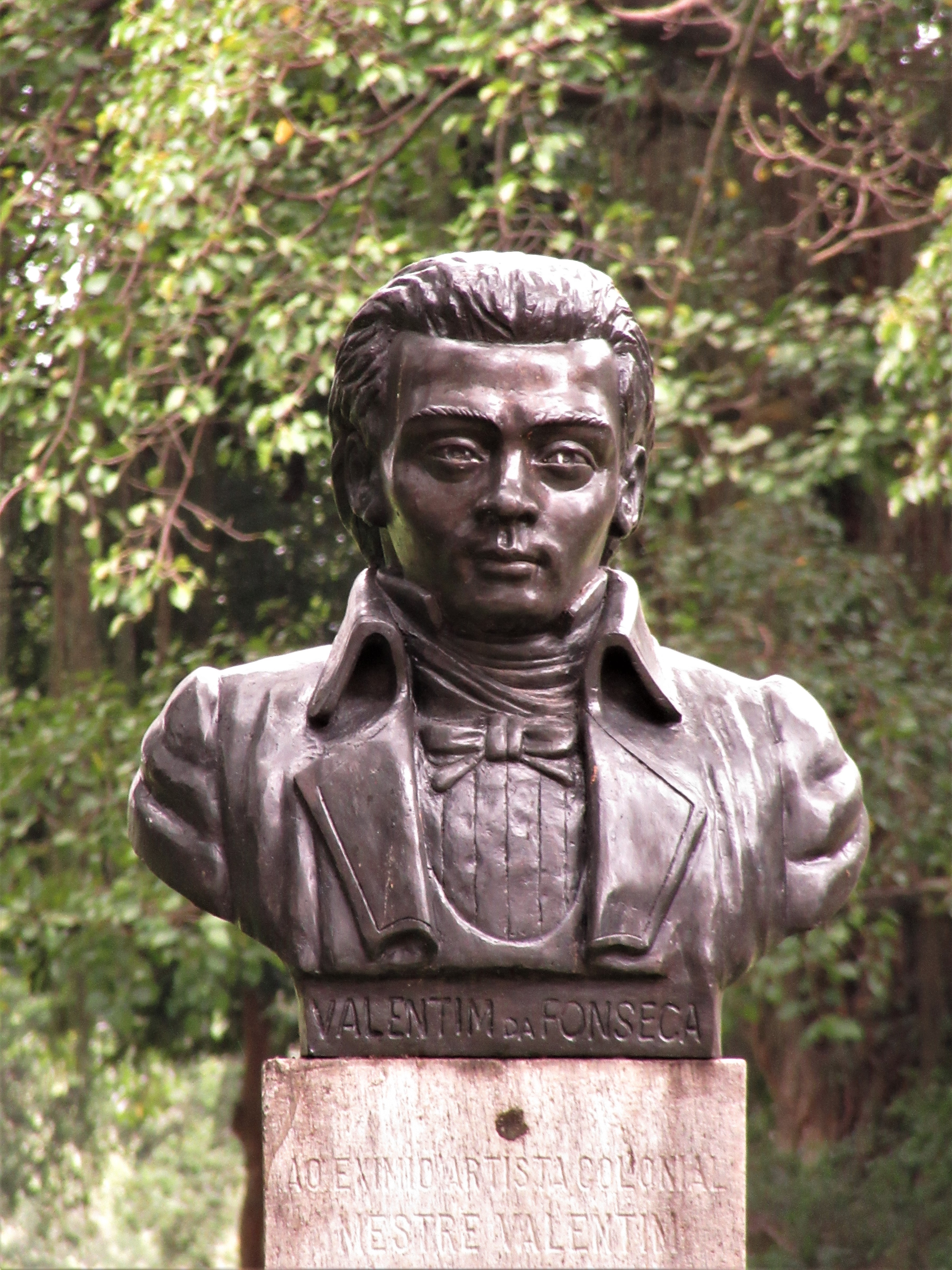
- Bust of Mestre Valentim, Passeio Público, Rio de Janeiro
- Born: c. 1745; Serro, Minas Gerais, Colonial Brazil, Portuguese Empire
- Died: March 2, 1813; Rio de Janeiro, Brazil, United Kingdom of Portugal, Brazil and the Algarves
- Known for: Sculpture, architecture, urban planning
- Style: Rococo

Valentim da Fonseca e Silva (c. 1745 – March 2, 1813), better known as Mestre Valentim, was a Brazilian sculptor, architect and urban planner, recognized for his contribution to 18th century Rio de Janeiro's public spaces and civic architecture. His work, particularly in sculpture, fountains, and cast-iron ornamentation, played a key role in shaping Rio's urban landscape during the period when the city was elevated to the status of the capital of the Portuguese Viceroyalty. His sculptures were the first to contain elements of tropical flora and fauna. Like Antonio Francisco Lisboa, also known as Aleijadinho, he is one of the most famous artists of colonial Brazil and was of mixed race. Mestre Valentim recounts details of his life in his testament. He is the Patron of the 37th chair of the Brazilian Academy of Fine Arts.

== Early life and education ==
Mestre Valentim was born in Serro do Frio, Minas Gerais, Brazil, to Manoel da Fonseca e Silva, a white man, and Amatilde da Fonseca, a black woman. Although he never married, his relationship with Josefa Maria da Conceição resulted in a daughter named Joana. Although the details of his artistic training are up to debate, he may have traveled to Portugal with his family as a child, where he received his artistic and technical training. His European education allowed him to develop expertise in baroque and rococo styles, which he later adapted to Brazilian artistic traditions. Upon returning to Brazil, he worked on various projects under Viceroy Luís de Vasconcelos e Souza, becoming one of Rio de Janeiro's most influential urban planner and sculptors.

== Career ==
He began his career as a sculptor, and numerous sculptural works within Rio de Janeiro's churches have been attributed to him. He was also instrumental in creating a foundry and in producing the first large-scale bronze cast sculptures made in Brazil.

=== Public Works and Urban Planning ===
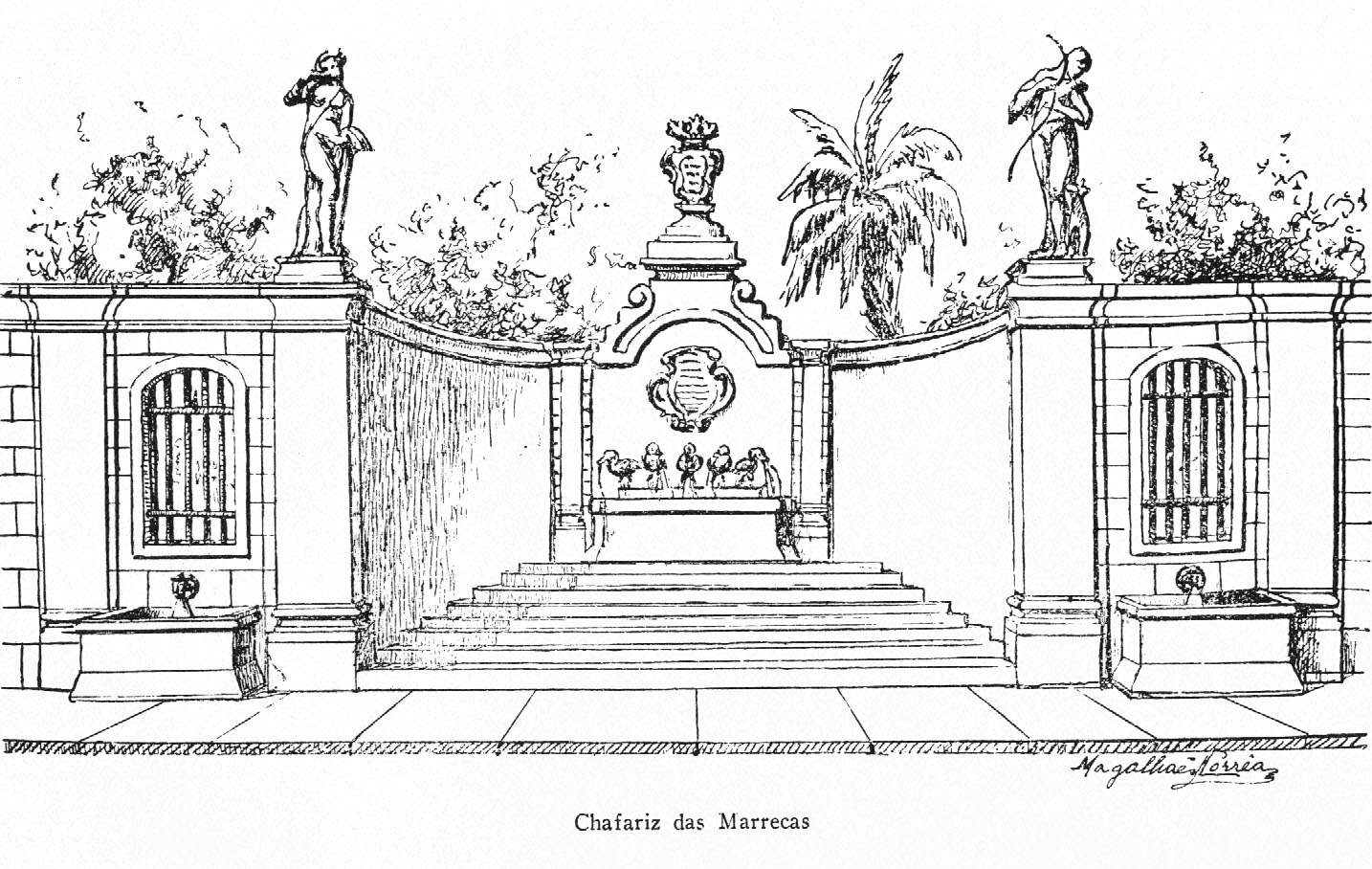
Chafariz das Marrecas 18th-century fountain in Rio de Janeiro, Brazil, designed by Mestre Valentim

During the late 18th century, Rio de Janeiro lacked a proper aqueduct system, making water distribution a major concern for the city's growing population. Mestre Valentim played a crucial role in addressing these issues through the design and construction of public fountains, which combined functionality with artistic innovation. One of his earliest projects, the Marrecas Fountain (1783), was commissioned by Viceroy Luís de Vasconcelos e Souza after Valentim successfully completed sanitation work in the Boqueirão da Ajuda Lagoon, an area later developed into the Passeio Público. Designed in an exedra form, the fountain's geometric projection deviated from traditional European models, introducing ornamental details that gave it a unique architectural identity.

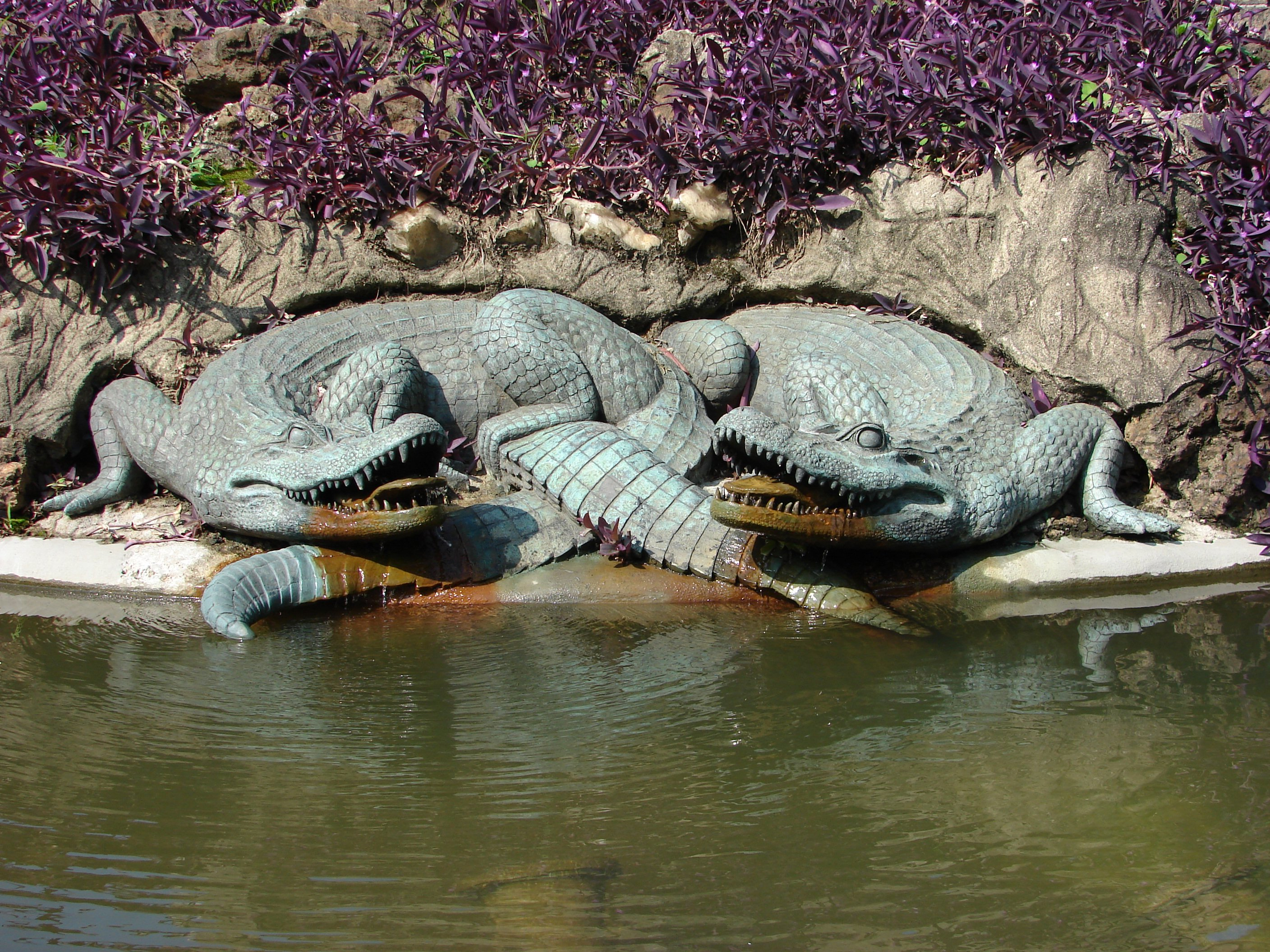
Alligator fountain, Passeio Publico, Rio de Janeiro

His Alligator Fountain, considered one of the most elaborate decorative motifs in Passeio Público, marked an early attempt to stylize Brazilian fauna in public art. Unlike European fountains, which typically featured gargoyle-style waterspouts, Valentim's fountains had water flowing from the mouths of native animals, an innovation in Brazilian artistic nationalism. Another significant work, the Os Elefants Fountain, included sculpted figures on angular stone pillars, which used a technique not yet widespread in Brazil at the time known as artistic casting. His experimentation with metal casting began a few years earlier with the sculpting of alligators, birds, and coconut trees for Passeio Público.

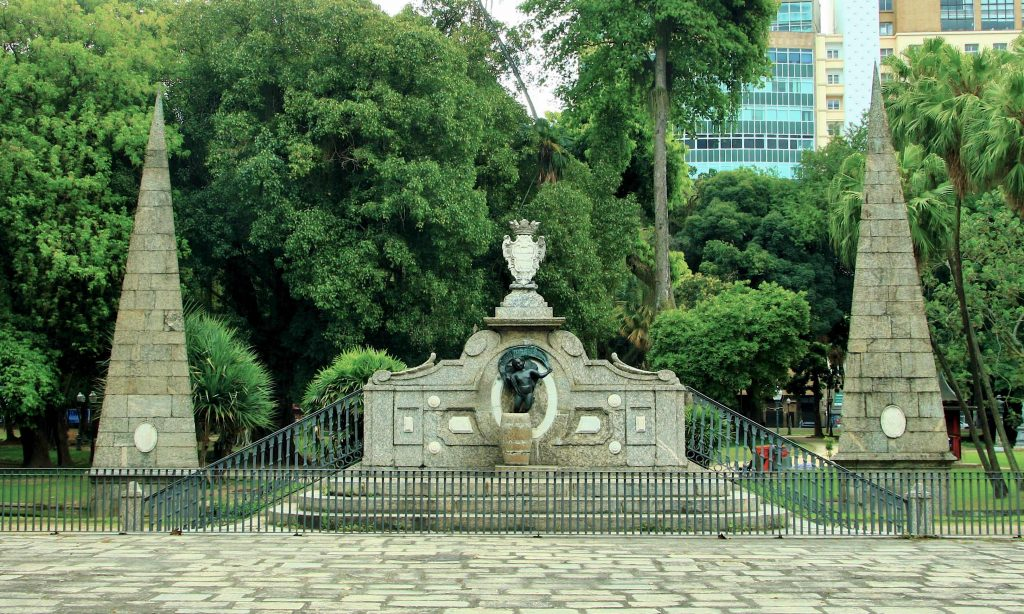
Obelisks, Mestre Valentim, Passeio Publico, Rio de Janeiro, begun 1779, inaugurated 1783

One of Mestre Valentim's most significant contributions to urban planning was his work on Passeio Público, Brazil's first public park, completed under Viceroy Vasconcelos. The sculptural works of the park include stylized entrance gates; two obelisks; statutes of Greek gods and Brazilian plants and animals; and several fountains. The park featured two pavilions containing paintings by Leandro Joaquim (1738–1798). Modeled after European civic gardens, particularly those in Lisbon, the park was laid out in an irregular hexagonal shape with a network of pathways intersecting at parallel, perpendicular, and diagonal angles. Unfortunately, most of Mestre Valentim's design has since been altered, many of the sculptures removed, and the pavilions eliminated. This design provided Rio de Janeiro with its first structured leisure space, reflecting the city's transition toward modern city planning.

Exceptional for an artist of color in colonial Brazil, Mestre Valentim became an architect. He received numerous commissions from the viceroy Dom Luiz de Vasconcelos e Souza. Also unusual for a colonial Brazilian artist is the fact that a portrait painted during his lifetime still exists today. João Francisco Muzzi's painting includes Mestre Valentim presenting architectural plans to the viceroy.

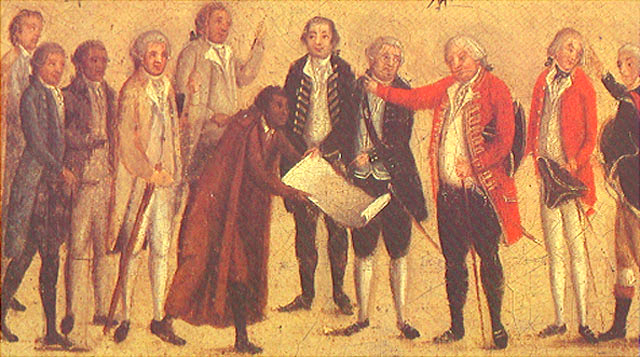
detail, João Francisco Muzzi, Happy and quick rebuilding of the church of the old Monastery of Nossa Senhora do Parto, started in August 25th, 1789 and concluded in Dezember 2nd of the same year.

== Controversies and Historical Misinterpretations ==
Some of Mestre Valentim's work were modified or misattributed in later historical accounts. The Marrecas Fountain, was altered with inscriptions honoring other figures, leading to disputes over its original design and intent. Historian Magalhães Corrêa criticized some of Valentim's projects, questioning their authenticity and execution.

Additionally, European travelers in the 19th century often misinterpreted his fountains, describing ornamental details that did not exist in the original designs. These factors contributed to ongoing debates about his artistic legacy. Today, little of his designs remain.

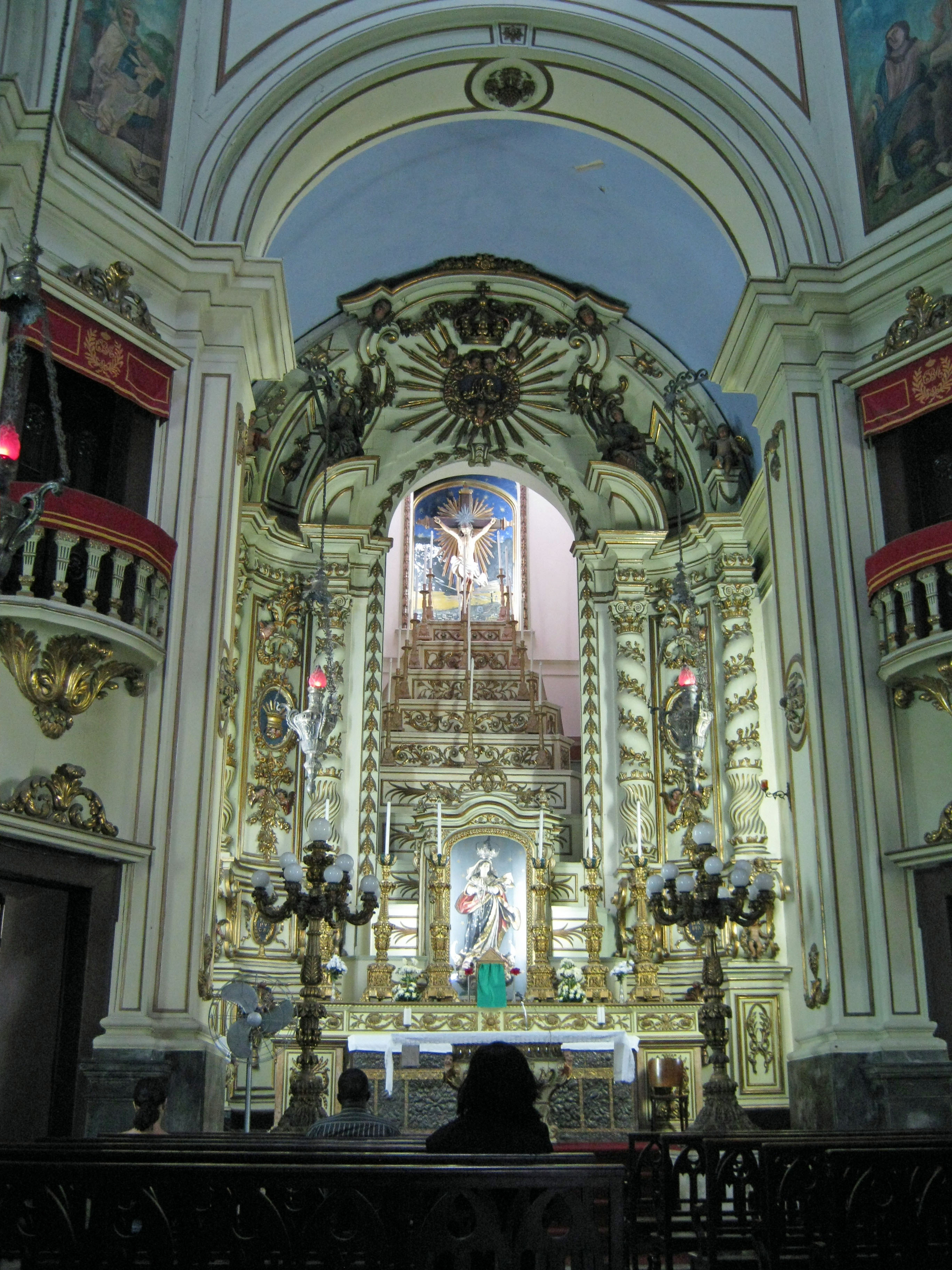
Igreja de Nossa Senhora da Conceição e Boa Morte

== Other works ==
Igreja de Nossa Senhora da Conceição e Boa Morte is a church located in central region of Rio de Janeiro. The altarpiece of the high alter was carved by Mestre Valentim.

Mosteiro de São Bento is a Benedictine abbey located in downtown Rio de Janeiro. The chandeliers in the chapel were made by Mestre Valentim between 1781 and 1783.

Igreja da Ordem Terceira do Carmo is located in São Paulo Brazil.

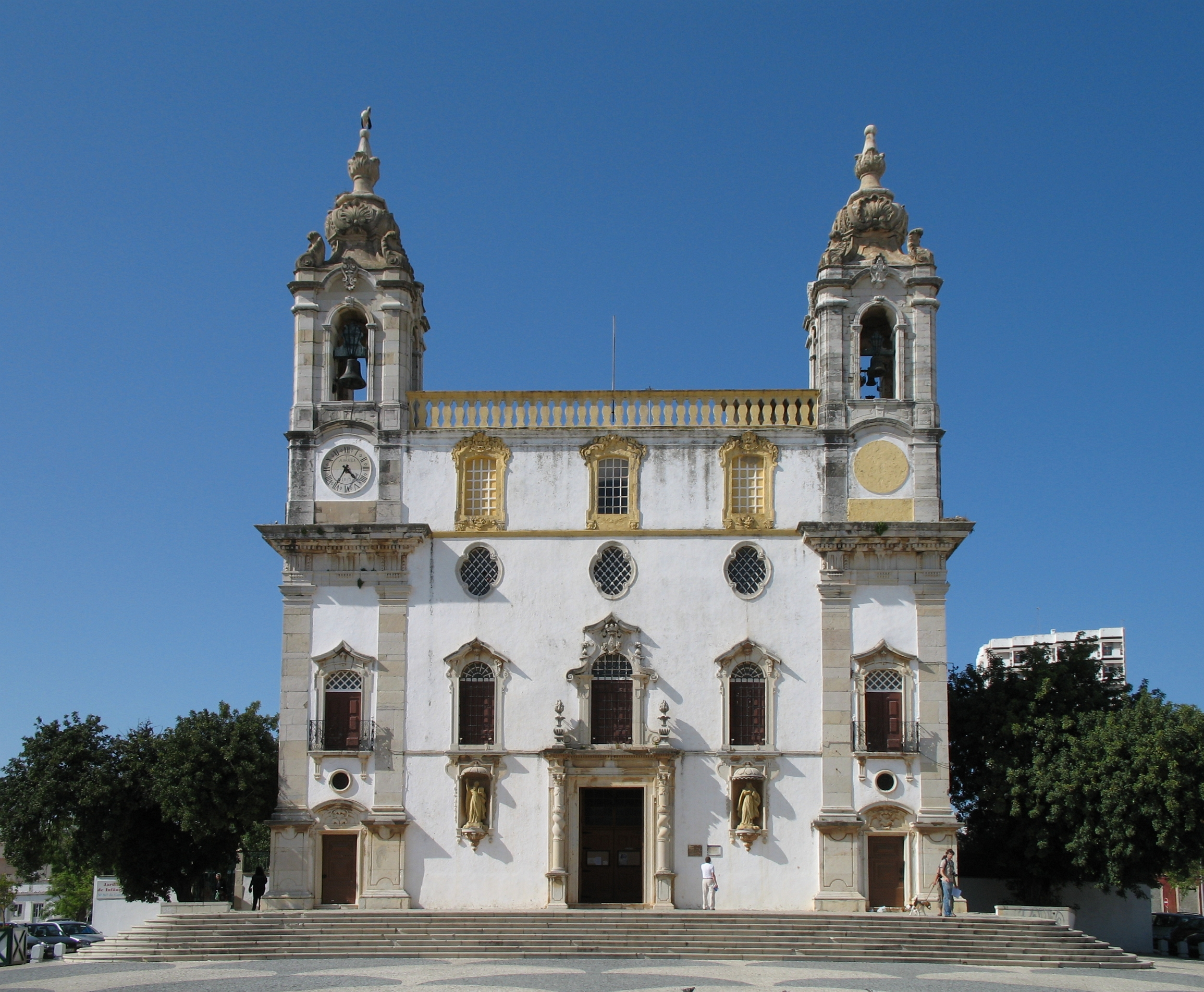
Igreja da Ordem Terceira do Carmo

Igreja de São Francisco de Paula is a Roman catholic church located in Largo de São Francisco de Paula, in thecity of Rio de Janeiro. The high altar and the chapel of Our Lady of Victory was done by Mestre Valentim.

Recolhimento de Nossa Senhora do Parto in Rio de Janeiro housed abandoned women and girls until the fire of August 24, 1789. There, Mestre Valentim began the recovery process and was completed three months later.
