= UNASP São Paulo Memory Center =

Museum in Capão Redondo, São Paulo, Brazil

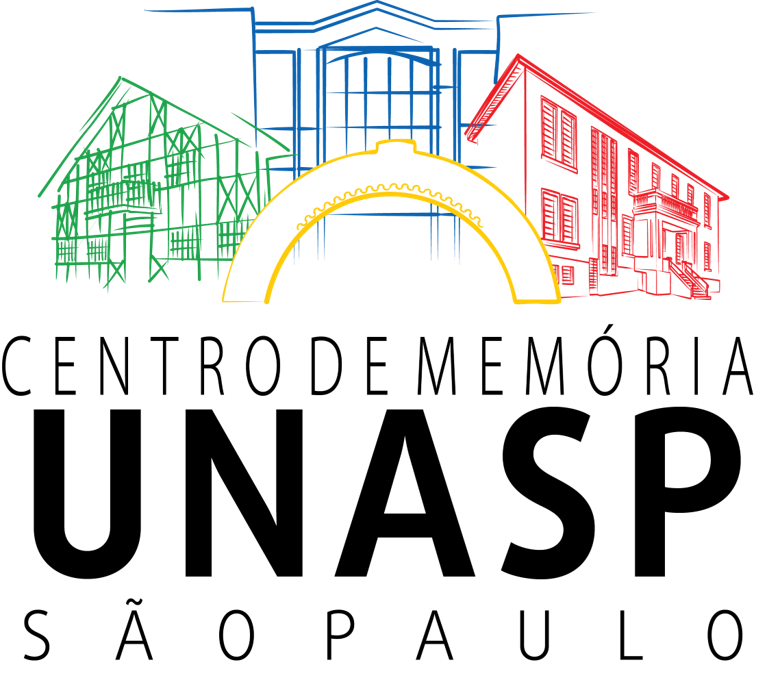

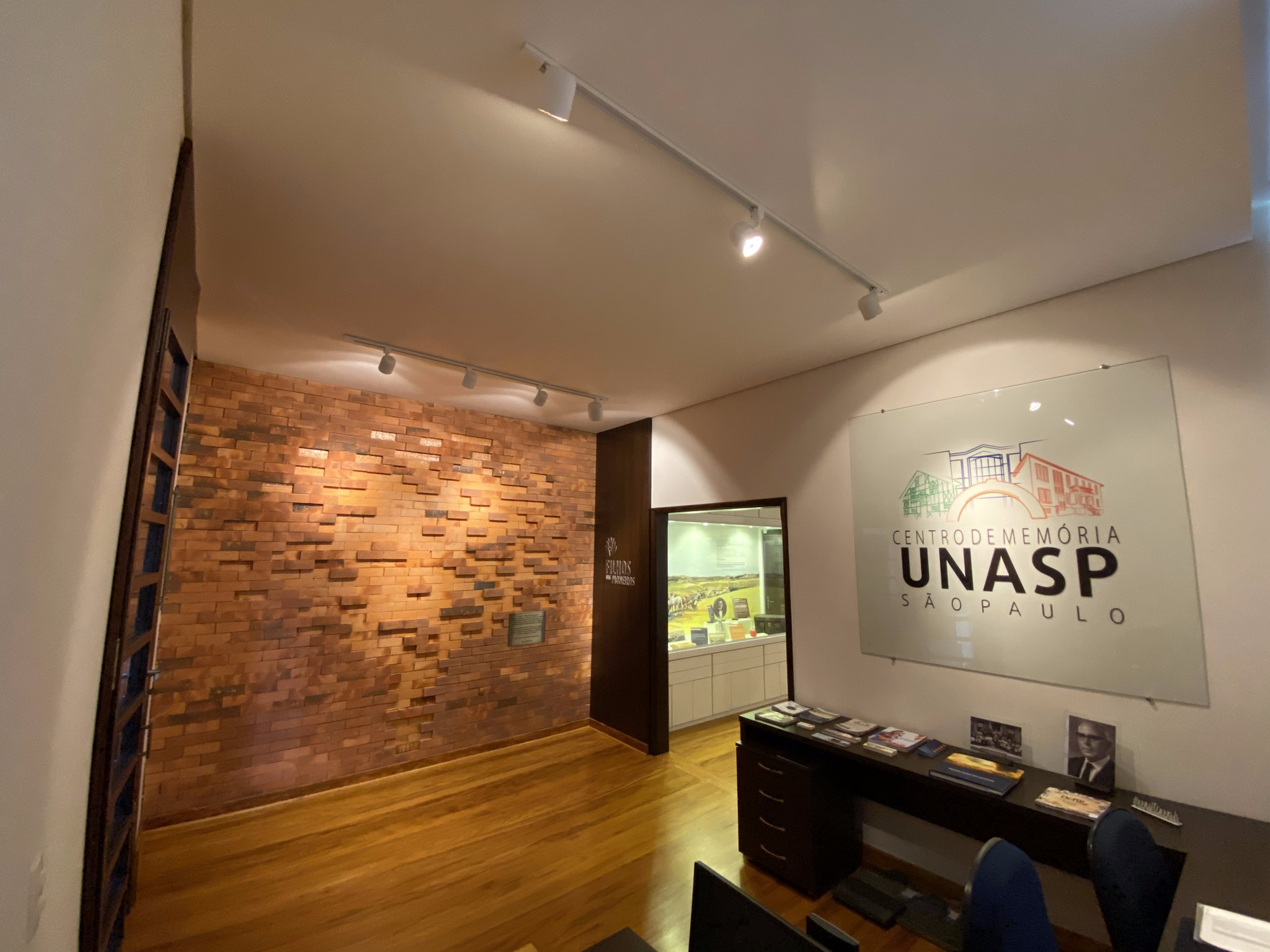

- Location within São Paulo State
- Location: Capão Redondo, São Paulo, São Paulo, Brazil
- Coordinates: 23°40′0.3″S 46°46′46.8″W
- Type: Museum
- Director: Emily Kruger Bertazzo
- Website: unasp.br/sp/memoriaunaspsp/

Created and maintained by the Adventist University Center of São Paulo (UNASP) São Paulo campus, the UNASP São Paulo Memory Center is the first museological institution in Capão Redondo. It aims to preserve and disseminate the memory of UNASP, as well as of the early days of the Capão Redondo neighborhood, located in the southern part of the city of São Paulo. The museum produces research, exhibitions, events and books relating the history of the neighborhood and the memory of its sustaining institution, as well as of the Seventh-day Adventist Church and the Adventist Education Network.

Currently, the Memory Center has free and open access for all audiences. Individual or group visits are received and must be booked in advance. The space has an access ramp for people with special needs.

== History ==
The UNASP is an educational institution founded in 1915 in Capão Redondo. It was called Adventist Seminary, Adventist College, Brazilian Adventist College, Adventist Institute of Education (IAE), and in 1999 it was renamed UNASP. It is the first institution installed in the then hinterland of Santo Amaro, in the district we know today as Capão Redondo, south zone of the city of São Paulo.

In 2015, UNASP celebrated its centennial with more than 100 commemorative events and products throughout the year, among concerts, tributes etc. Once the centennial was over, it was realized the need to open a museum that would tell the story of the institution and the neighborhood, due to the fact that this is the oldest institution operating uninterruptedly for over 100 years.

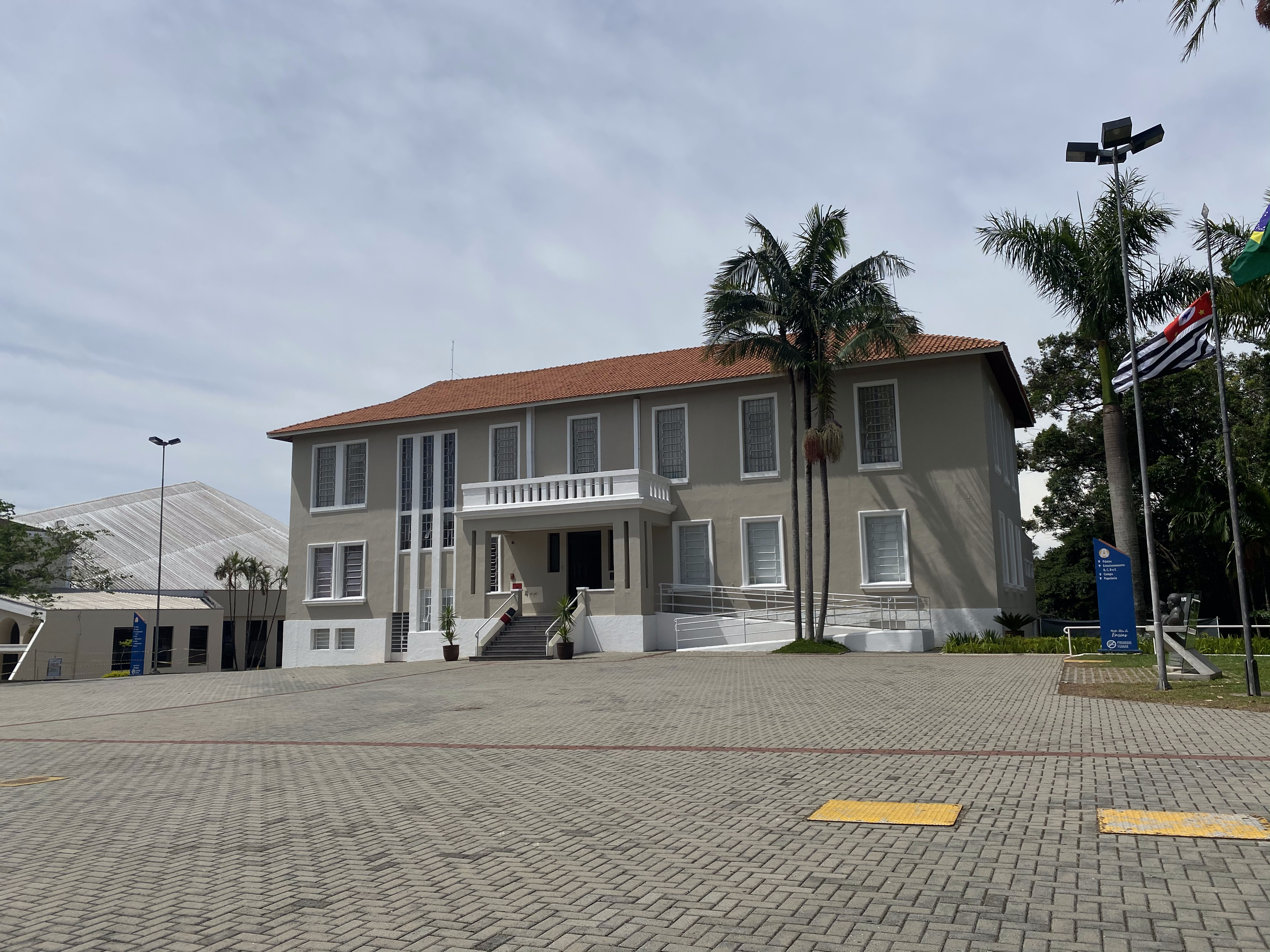
Central Building in 2021, a CONPRESP listed building where the UNASP Memory Center is located.

In parallel to these events, the UNASP's Heritage Registration Process took place between 2014 and 2018. A group of alumni organized to assemble a request with the Department of Historical Heritage of the city of São Paulo (DPH DP), to be evaluated by the Municipal Council for the Preservation of the Historical, Cultural and Environmental Heritage of the City of São Paulo (CONPRESP) the possibility of tumbling the architectural and environmental complex of the Adventist University Center.

The request was accepted by DPH, a survey was conducted, and on November 28, 2018, Resolution No. 58 of 2018 was published in the Official Gazette, concluding the process with the listing of the complex, being this the first listed site of Capão Redondo. The Heritage Registration is the public recognition that the institution has historical, cultural, architectural, and environmental relevance for the neighborhood and the city. According to the São Paulo City Hall's GeoSampa website, the UNASP complex is the only listed property in the district of Capão Redondo.

In view of these events, the General Directorate of UNASP, decided to start a Project for Implementation of a Memory Center at the UNASP São Paulo campus, this space would aim to rescue, organize and disseminate details about the memory of the institution, as well as of the beginnings of Capão Redondo, given that the founding of this institution was one of the first vectors for the urbanization of the neighborhood.

Thanks to the efforts of Dr. Douglas Menslin, general director of UNASP São Paulo in the period, in May 2016 a team was assembled to begin to rescue historical materials and organize the Implementation Project. After some research was done, materials were gathered for the collection, and some temporary exhibitions were displayed in the institution's spaces. In 2019, a space was inaugurated for the Memory Center, located in the Central Building of the institution. Belonging to the listed complex, this building is the oldest that has virtually all of the original architectural features preserved.

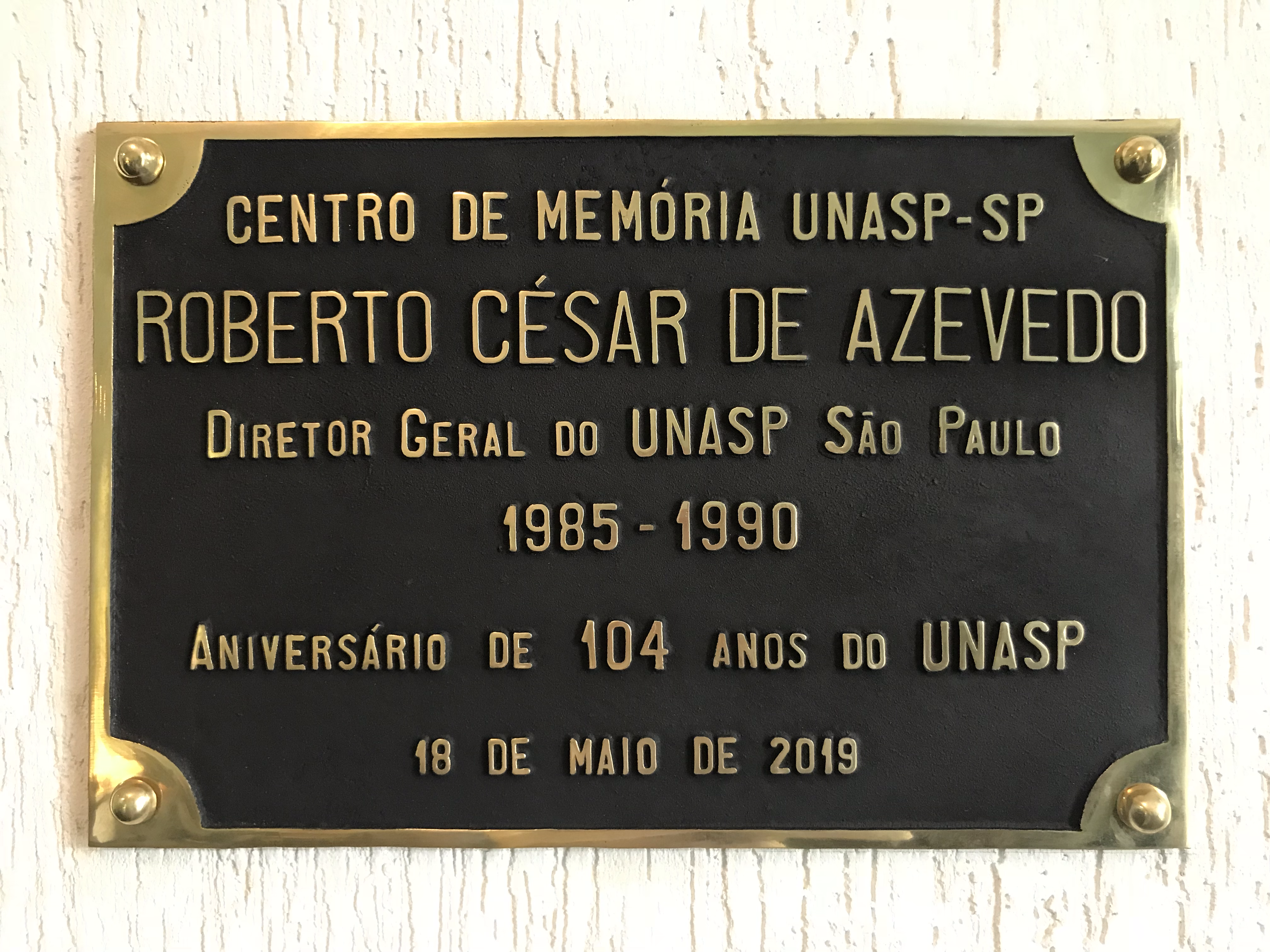
Inauguration sign of the UNASP São Paulo Memory Center.

== Tribute ==
The Memory Center space is named after one of UNASP's directors. Professor Roberto Azevedo was born in 1943, was a student of the Scientific Course of the IAE (now UNASP) in the 1960s, attended Biological Sciences at USP, graduating in 1967. He was professor of biology at IAE between 1964 and 1972. He served as administrator in other instances of the Adventist Education Network, and between 1985 and 1990 was the General Director of UNASP. Prof. Roberto has a significant role in the advancement of Adventist education in Brazil and in the preservation of its memory.

== The Memory Center ==
=== Collection ===
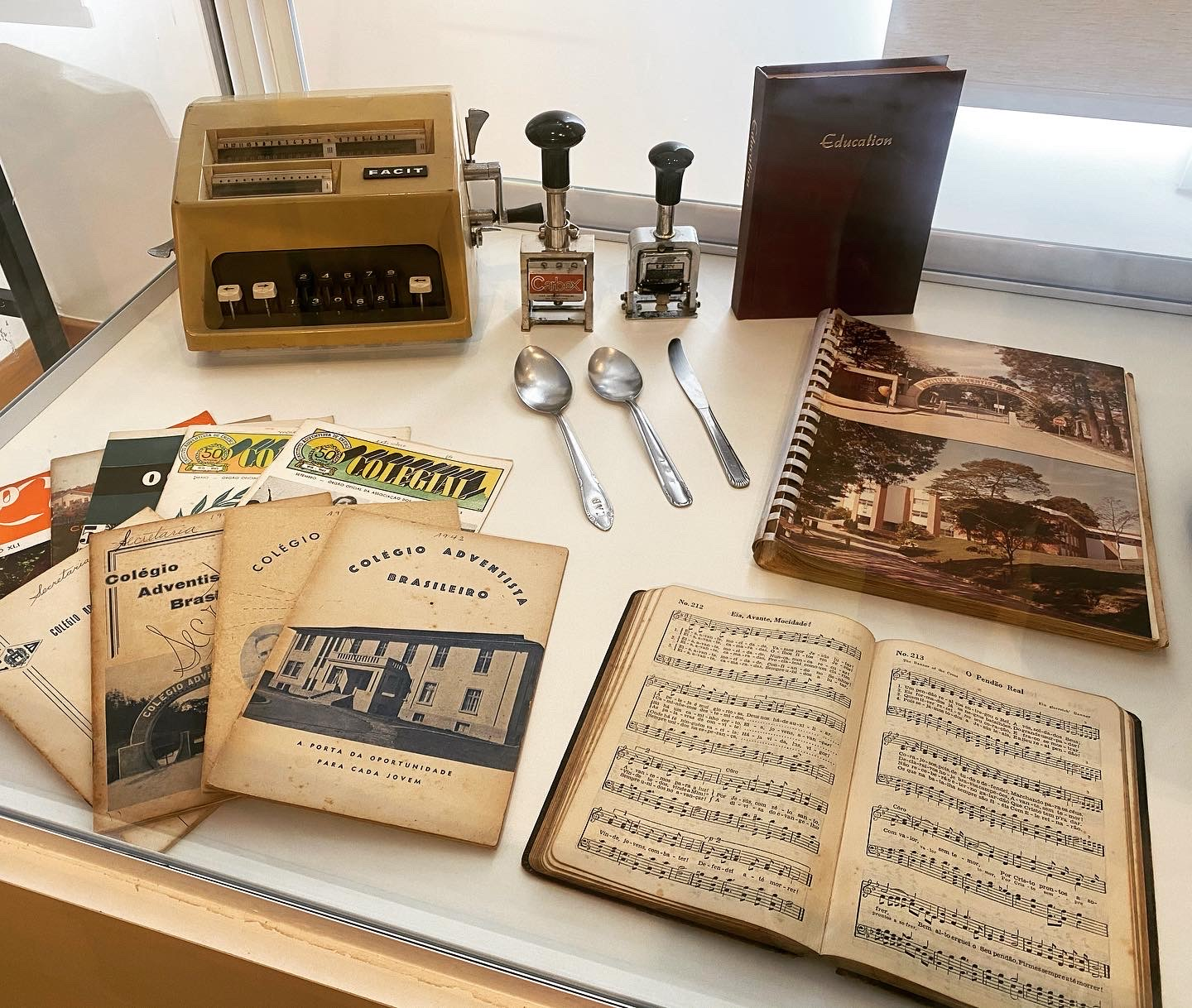
Objects from the Memory Center's collection.

The museum has hundreds of pieces of various origins and types that tell the story of the institution and the neighborhood. They are three-dimensional objects, cartographic, iconographic, videographic, and periodical documents, among others, which are still being organized and catalogued. They are items gathered within the institution itself or donated by families of former students and collaborators.

=== Research ===
In partnership with the course of Architecture and Urbanism of UNASP, the Memory Center has a research group registered with CNPQ: the Laboratory of History and Memory Studies of UNASP (LEHME). The group has 10 researchers, academics from UNASP and the Adventist Education Network. It also has undergraduate students, foreign collaborators and technicians.

The objective of the group is to research about

- the memory of the Adventist Church in Brazil and, in special, the institutional memory of UNASP;
- the history of the Capão Redondo neighborhood;
- Cultural Heritage, material and immaterial, listing and preservation.

=== Exhibition ===
The inaugural long term exhibition is entitled "Murmurs of a Hill: the missionary movement and the construction of the Adventist Seminary, 1915-1925". This exhibition talks about the process of implantation of the farm of the then Seminary, now UNASP, in the rural area of the hinterland of Santo Amaro. Topics such as the construction of the first buildings, the integral education model, the Dutch plantations and cattle, the first graduation, and the history of the founders are covered. The three-dimensional pieces and photographs are accompanied by phrases or whispers written by the pioneers of the institutions themselves, written in letters and documents in the collection.

=== Gallery ===
Photos from inside the Memory Center:

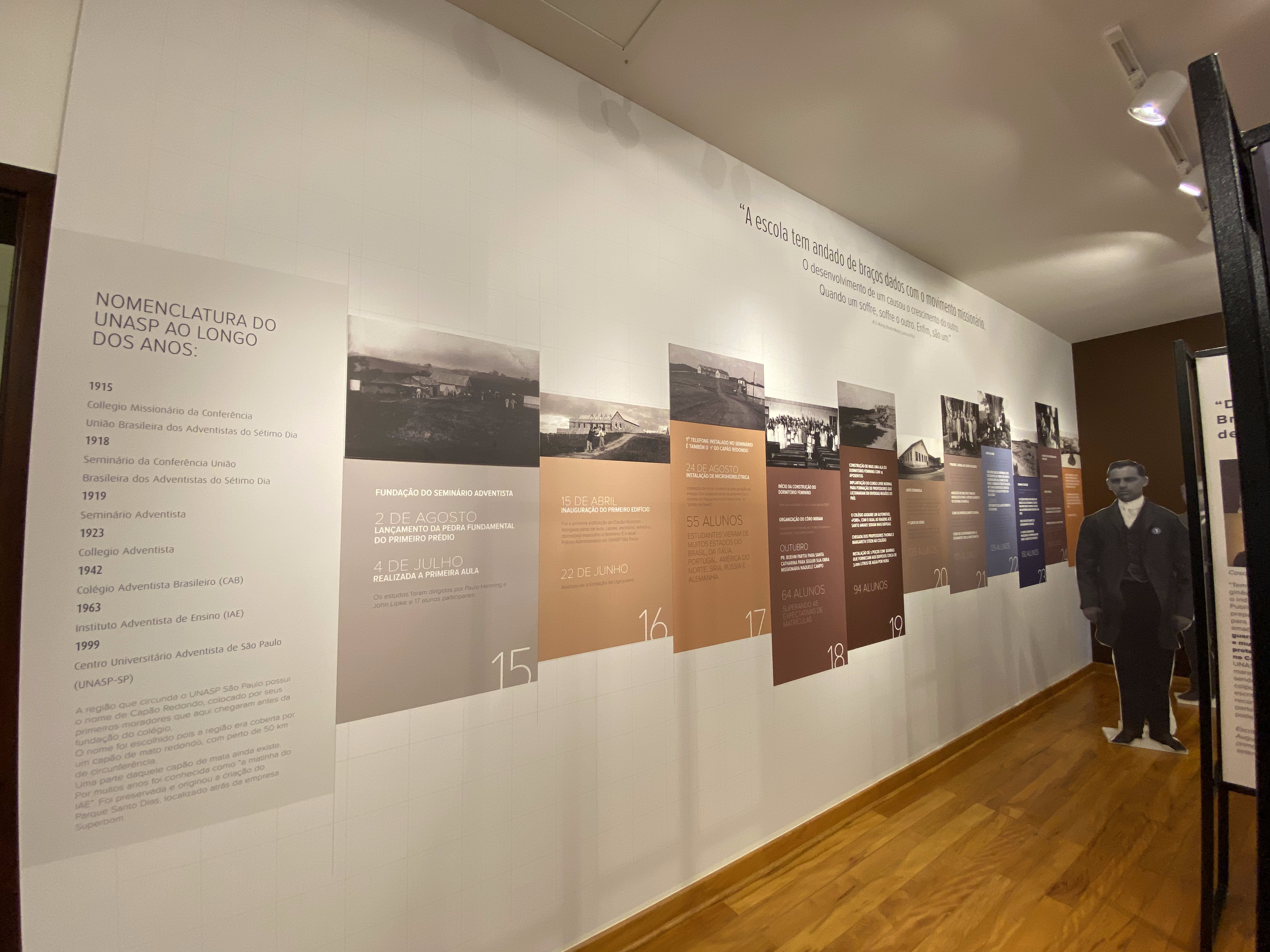

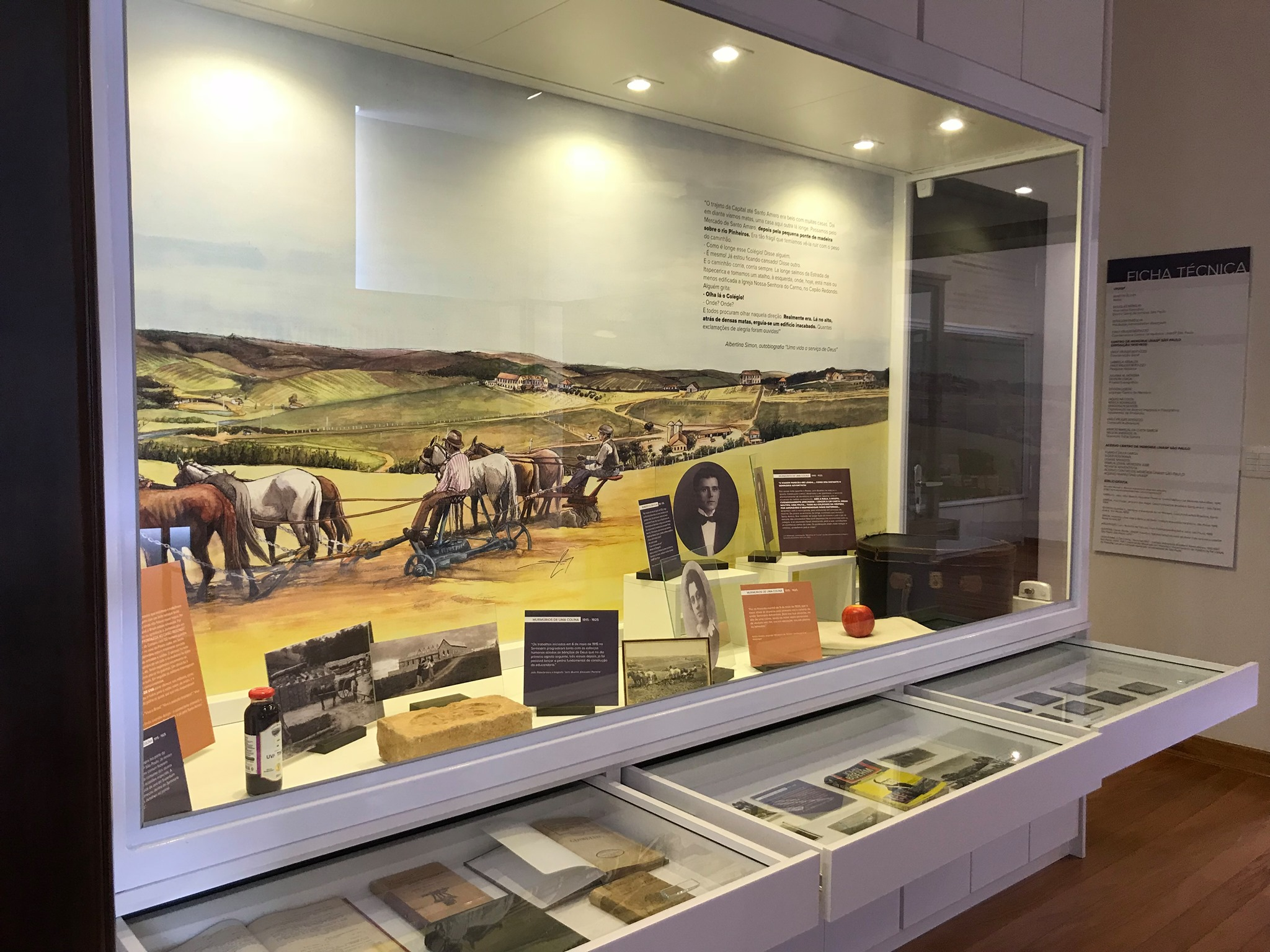

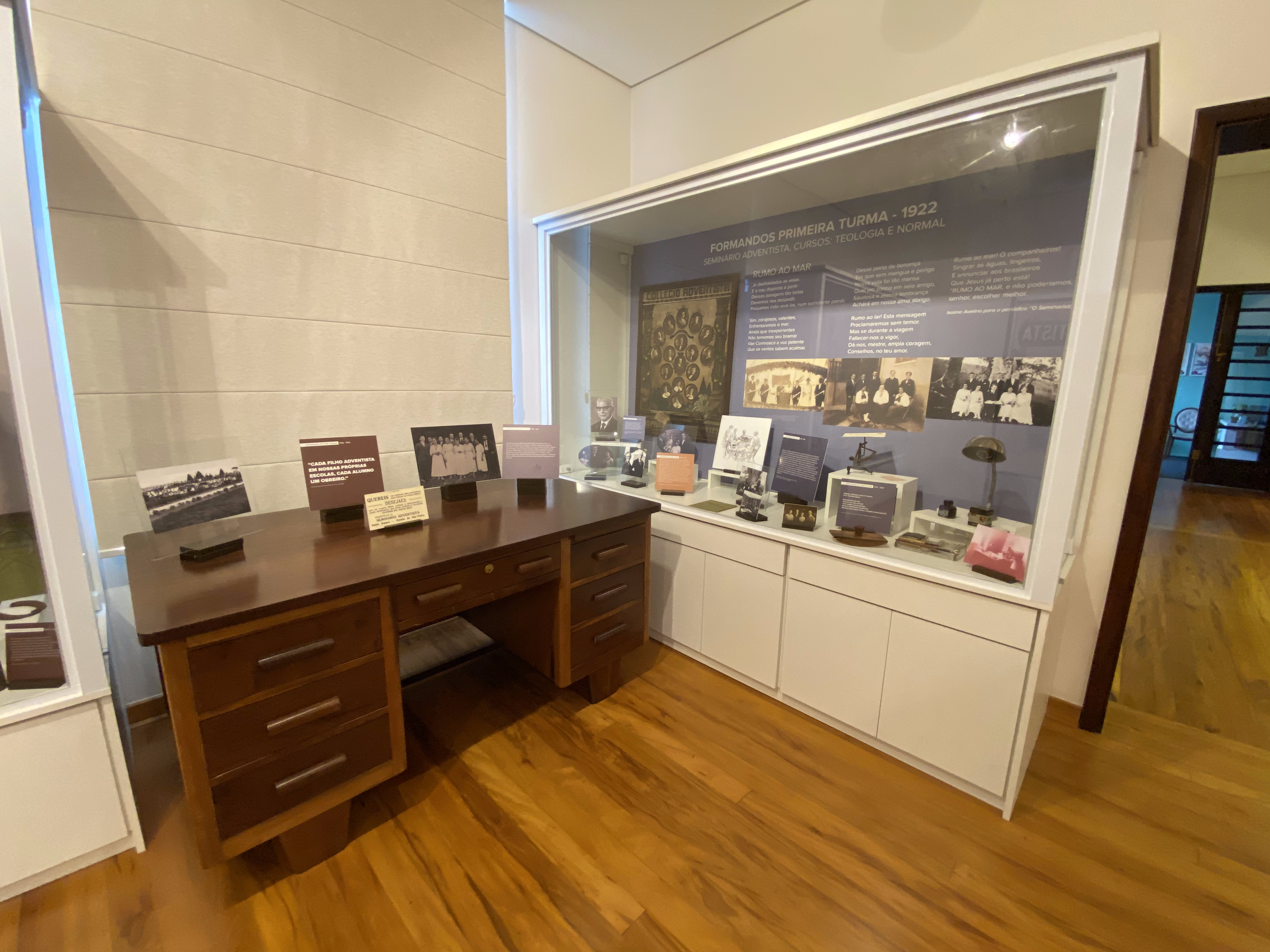

== See also ==
- Seventh-day Adventist Church
- Seventh-day Adventist education
- Capão Redondo

== Bibliography ==
- Menslin, Douglas (2004). A educação adventista no Brasil: uma história de aventuras e milagres. UNASPRESS.
- Menslin, Douglas (2021). UNASP no tempo: Histórias, tradições e transformações. Unaspress.
- Hosokawa, Elder (2001). Da Colina, "Rumo ao Mar": Colégio Adventista Brasileiro Santo Amaro 1915-1947 (Thesis). São Paulo: Faculdade de Filosofia, Letras e Ciências Humanas, Universidade de São Paulo.
