= Capão Redondo =

District of São Paulo, Brazil

Coordinates: 23.6687°S 46.77°W

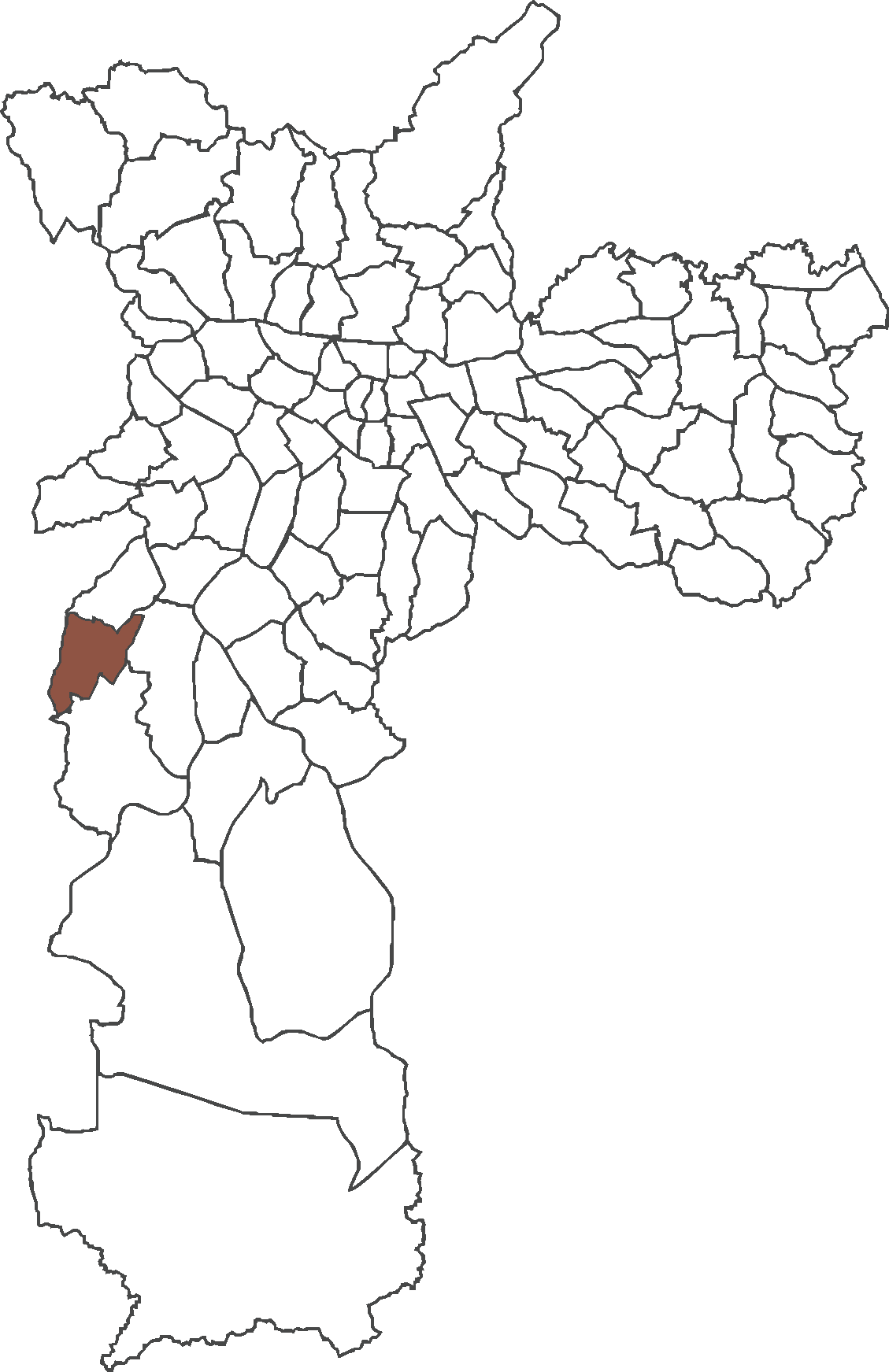
- District of the city of São Paulo
- Country: Brazil
- State: São Paulo
- Municipality: São Paulo
- Subprefecture: Campo Limpo

Area
  - Total: 13.60 km^{2} (5.25 sq mi)

Population (2007)
  - Total: 268,729
  - Density: 19,759/km^{2} (51,180/sq mi)
- Website: Subprefecture of Campo Limpo

Capão Redondo is one of 96 districts in the city of São Paulo, Brazil.

== See also ==
- UNASP São Paulo Memory Center
