= Poá (CPTM) =

Railway station in São Paulo, Brazil

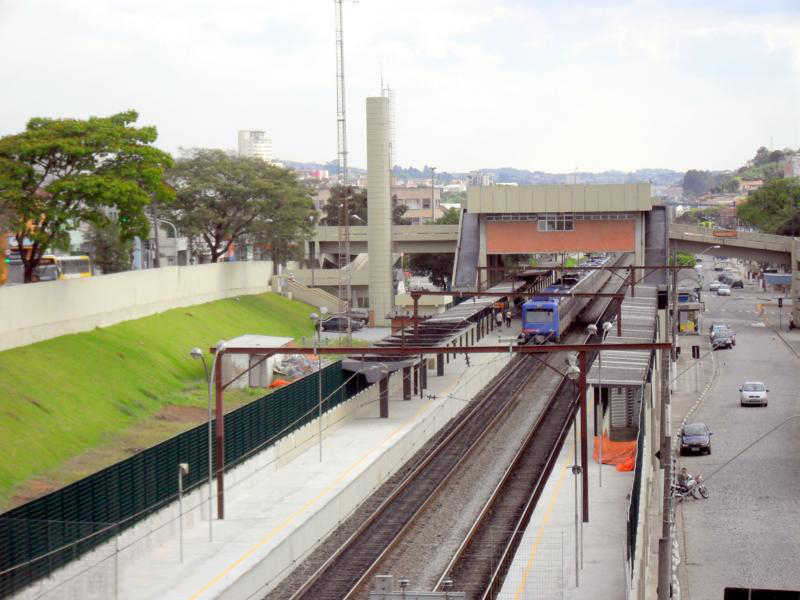
- Poá station, in 2009, before modernization work.

General information
- Location: Av. Brasil, s/n Centro; Brazil
- Coordinates: 23.525363°S 46.343556°W
- Owner: Government of the State of São Paulo
- Operator: CPTM
- Platforms: Side platforms
- Connections: Poá Bus Terminal

Construction
- Structure type: Surface

Other information
- Station code: POA

History
- Opened: 6 January 1875
- Rebuilt: 30 August 2016

Services
Preceding station	São Paulo Metropolitan Trains	Following station
Ferraz de Vasconcelos towards Palmeiras-Barra Funda	Line 11	Calmon Viana towards Estudantes
Track layout
Location

Poá is a train station on CPTM Line 11-Coral, located in the city of Poá.

== History ==
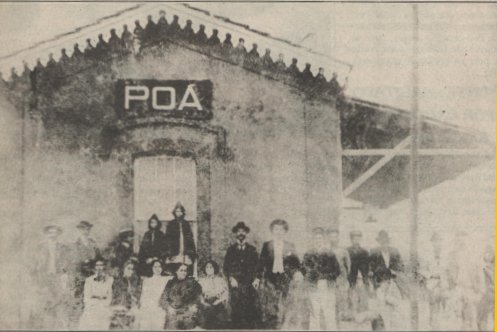
First building of the station, in 1875.

With the opening of North Railway in mid-1875, supply posts were created between the stations. One of them was in Poá, then district of Mogi das Cruzes. Only on 1 March 1891, a new building was constructed, and the post was promoted to station. With Poá growth, the station existing there was expanded in the 1920s.

The construction of the current station started in 1985 by CBTU. Harmed by financial problems, the building of the new building was concluded only in 1989.

On 1 June 1994, CBTU stations and lines were transferred to CPTM. Since then, the station belongs to this company.

=== Project ===
On 29 January 2005, CPTM launched the concurrence no. 8379402011, aiming the modernization/reconstruction of 12 stations divided in 6 allotments of 2 station. Poá station is part of Allotment no. 6, along with Itapevi station. On 18 March 2005, the final result was published, being ratified the Sondotecnica/Urbaniza consortium by the cost of 1,056,808 BRL (631,749.06 USD). The project was presented to the public in June 2007, during public hearings for the construction hiring.

The modernization work of Poá station was hired only in 2011, through bidding notice no. 8419110011 launched on 1 November 2011. The final result, as published on 6 March 2012, was that it was won by the Pedra Coral consortium, who bid 16,158,333.13 BRL (8,273,305.42 USD).

After delays, the reformed station was delivered on 30 August 2016, at final cost of 20,189,267.15 BRL (10,337,203.23 USD), above previously budgeted.
