= Antonio Gianetti Neto (CPTM) =

Railway station in São Paulo, Brazil

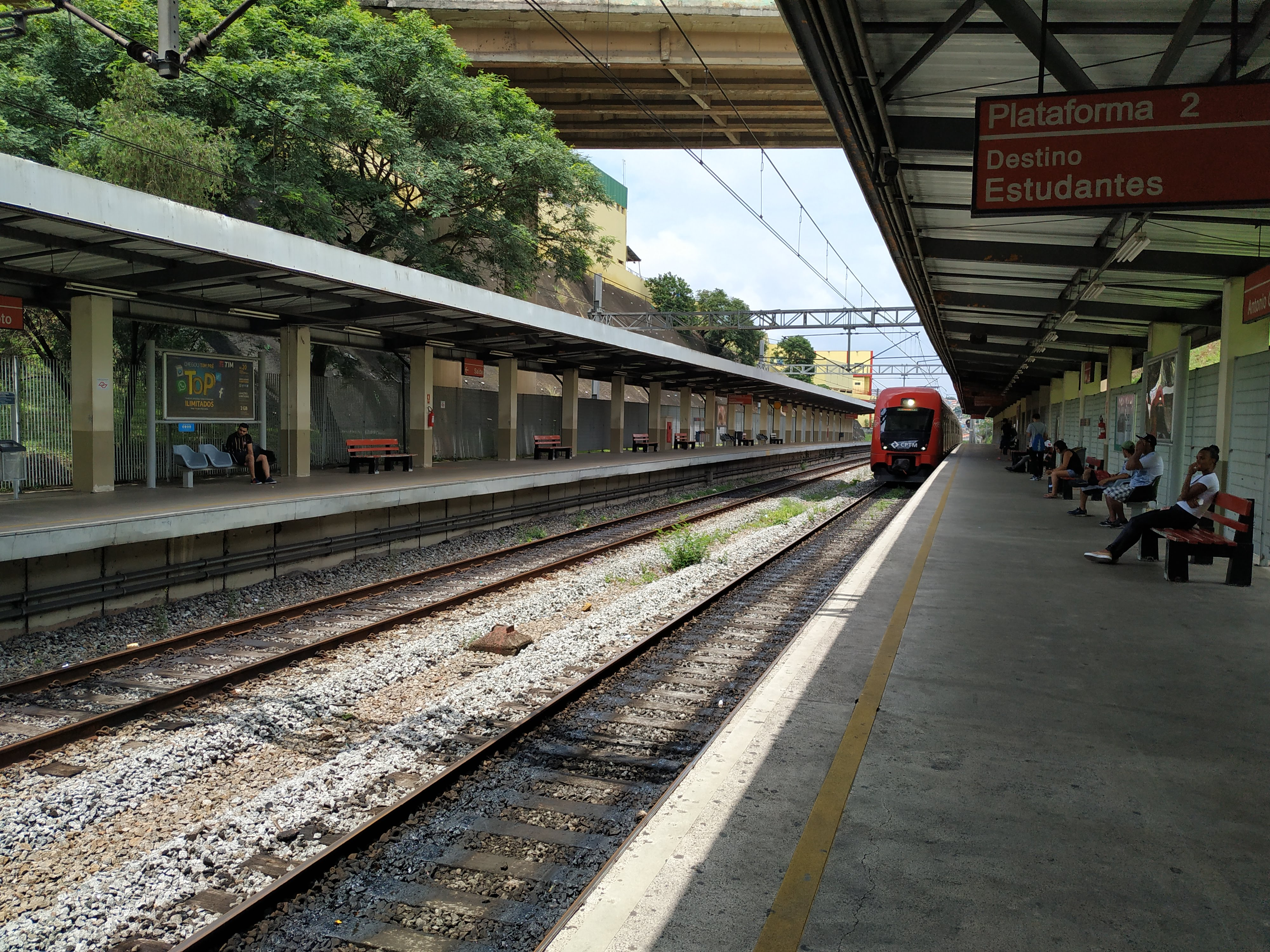
- Platforms of the station in 2018.

General information
- Location: Av. Gov. Jânio Quadros, s/n Parque São Francisco; Brazil
- Coordinates: 23.554359°S 46.383687°W
- Owner: Government of the State of São Paulo
- Operator: CPTM
- Platforms: Side platforms

Construction
- Structure type: Surface

Other information
- Station code: AGN

History
- Opened: 10 January 1998
- Former names: Lageado

Services
| Preceding station | São Paulo Metropolitan Trains | Following station |
|---|---|---|
| Guaianases towards Palmeiras-Barra Funda | Line 11 | Ferraz de Vasconcelos towards Estudantes |
Track layout
Location

Antonio Gianetti Neto is a train station on CPTM Line 11-Coral, located in the city of Ferraz de Vasconcelos.

== History ==
The first project for the station in the region was made by Brazilian Urban Trains Company (CBTU) in 1985, named that time as Parque de São Francisco. However, the construction never happened by lack of funds.

The station was built and opened by CPTM on 10 January 1998, named Lageado. On 19 August 1998, it was renamed to Antonio Gianetti Neto. It was the first station built by CPTM.

== Toponymy ==
The renaming happened when a Project from State Deputy Guilherme Gianetti (PMDB) was approved in the State Legislative Assembly by the other deputies. Deputy Gianetti wanted to pay tribute to his uncle, already deceased, by his contribution to the city of Ferraz de Vasconcelos and its region. Antonio Gianetti Neto went to Ferraz with his family as a child. He was one of the first in confection of bricks, having a brick factory. In the 1950s, found Agricultural and Pastoral Industry, in the neighbourhood of Cambiri, where he lived. The industry provided quartz for Gothard Factory and employed at the time 120 employees. Around 1962, opened Brasil Construction Material Warehouse, in Rua Godofredo Ozório Novais. Donated part of the materials for the construction of a school and made it easy the purchase of materials for residents build their houses.
