= Line 11 (CPTM) =

Line 11 (Coral)
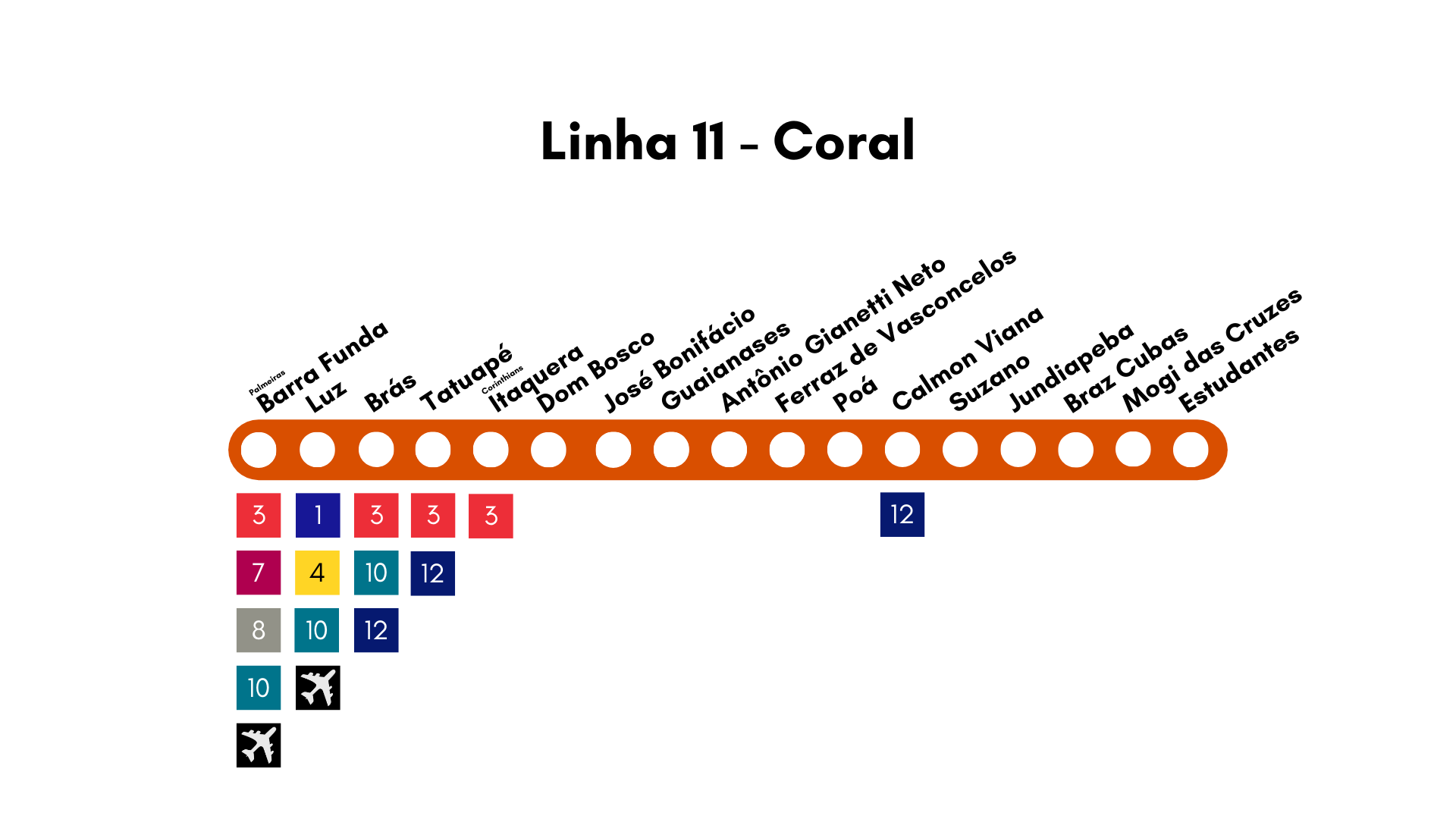

Overview
- Status: Operational
- Owner: Government of the State of São Paulo
- Locale: Greater São Paulo, Brazil
- Termini: Palmeiras–Barra Funda; Estudantes
- Connecting lines: Current: Future: Planned: 19
- Stations: 17 in operation 1 in construction 4 in project

Service
- Type: Commuter rail
- System: São Paulo Metropolitan Trains
- Services: Palmeiras–Barra Funda ↔ Estudantes; Palmeiras–Barra Funda ↔ Guianases; Guianases ↔ Estudantes
- Operator(s): CPTM
- Depot(s): Artur Alvim rail yard; Engenheiro São Paulo shelter; Guaianases rail yard; Mogi das Cruzes rail yard; Roosevelt rail yard
- Rolling stock: 288 CAF 8000 Series

History
- Opened: 1890; 136 years ago (Note: As part of Estrada de Ferro Central do Brasil)
- Last extension: 27 April 2000; 25 years ago

Technical
- Line length: 54.1 km (33.6 mi)
- Track gauge: 1,600 mm (5 ft 3 in)
- Electrification: Overhead line, 3,000 V DC
- Operating speed: 90 km/h (56 mph)
- Signalling: Automatic block signaling

Line 11 (Coral) (Portuguese: Linha 11–Coral), formerly Line E (Orange), is one of the thirteen lines that make up the São Paulo Metro Rail Transport Network in Brazil and one of the five lines operated by CPTM.

The section between stations Luz and Guaianases was completely modernized in late '90s, when many stations parallel to Line 3 - Red were closed. Since then, this part of the Line 11 - Coral is also known as the East Express (Portuguese: Expresso Leste). After the modernized section was opened in May 2000 the line was divided into two sections, and passengers were required to switch trains to proceed. Since April 2019 the line is once again unified, but in rush hours additional trains might travel between Luz and Guaianases only in order to increase seat availability to the most demanding stations.

As of April 2019, about 752,800 passengers use Line 11 - Coral each business day, with a headway of 4 minutes during rush hours and 8 minutes off-peak.)

== Stations ==
Code	Station	Platforms	Position	Connections	City
BFU	Palmeiras-Barra Funda	Island platforms	At-grade	Barra Funda Bus Terminal; Barra Funda Road Terminal	São Paulo
LUZ	Luz	Island and side platforms	At-grade	Touristic Express	São Paulo
BAS	Brás	Island platform	At-grade	Brás Bus Terminal	São Paulo
TAT	Tatuapé	Island platform	At-grade	North Tatuapé Bus Terminal; South Tatuapé Bus Terminal	São Paulo
**PEN**	**Penha-Lojas Besni**	Side platforms	Elevated	(Future); North Penha Bus Terminal; South Penha Bus Terminal	São Paulo
ITQ	Corinthians-Itaquera	Side platforms	Elevated	(Planned); Itaquera Bus Terminal	São Paulo
DBO	Dom Bosco	Side platforms	Elevated	-	São Paulo
JBO	José Bonifácio	Side platforms	Elevated	-	São Paulo
GUA	Guaianases	Island platforms	At-grade	Guaianases Bus Terminal	São Paulo
AGN	Antonio Gianetti Neto	Side platforms	At-grade	-	Ferraz de Vasconcelos
FVC	Ferraz de Vasconcelos	Island platform	At-grade	Ferraz de Vasconcelos Bus Terminal	Ferraz de Vasconcelos
POA	Poá	Side platforms	At-grade	Poá Bus Terminal	Poá
CMV	Calmon Viana	Side and island platforms	At-grade	Companhia Paulista de Trens Metropolitanos Line 12 (CPTM)	Poá
SUZ	Suzano	Island platform	At-grade	(Planned); Suzano Bus Terminal	Suzano
JPB	Jundiapeba	Side platforms	At-grade	-	Mogi das Cruzes
BCB	Braz Cubas	Side platforms	At-grade	-	Mogi das Cruzes
MDC	Mogi das Cruzes	Side and island platforms	At-grade	Touristic Express; Central Bus Terminal	Mogi das Cruzes
EST	Estudantes	Island and side platforms	At-grade	Estudantes Bus Terminal; Mogi das Cruzes Road Terminal	Mogi das Cruzes

Obs.: Stations in bold are under construction.
