= Jundiapeba (CPTM) =

Railway station in São Paulo, Brazil

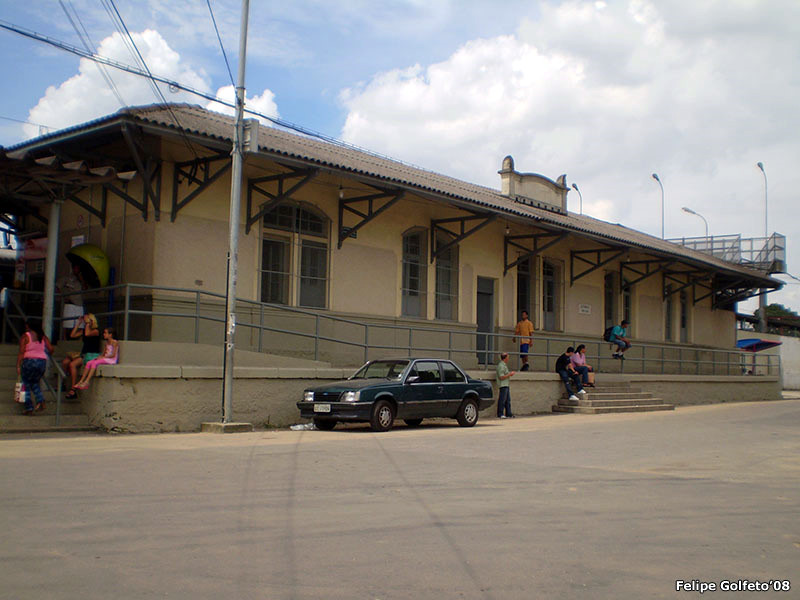

General information
- Location: Av. Dona Áurea Martins dos Anjos × R. Adriano Pereira; Jundiapeba; Brazil
- Coordinates: 23.542685°S 46.258079°W
- Owner: Government of the State of São Paulo
- Operator: CPTM
- Platforms: Side platforms

Construction
- Structure type: Surface

Other information
- Station code: JPB

History
- Opened: 20 July 1914
- Former names: Santo Ângelo

Services
Preceding station	São Paulo Metropolitan Trains	Following station
Suzano towards Palmeiras-Barra Funda	Line 11	Braz Cubas towards Estudantes
Track layout
Location

Jundiapeba is a train station on CPTM Line 11-Coral, located in the district of Jundiapeba in Mogi das Cruzes.

== History ==
Jundiapeba train station was built by EFCB and opened on 20 July 1914 named Santo Ângelo. It was renamed to Jundiapeba in mid-1950s. The station was transferred from CBTU to CPTM in 1994.
