= Braz Cubas (CPTM) =

Railway station in São Paulo, Brazil

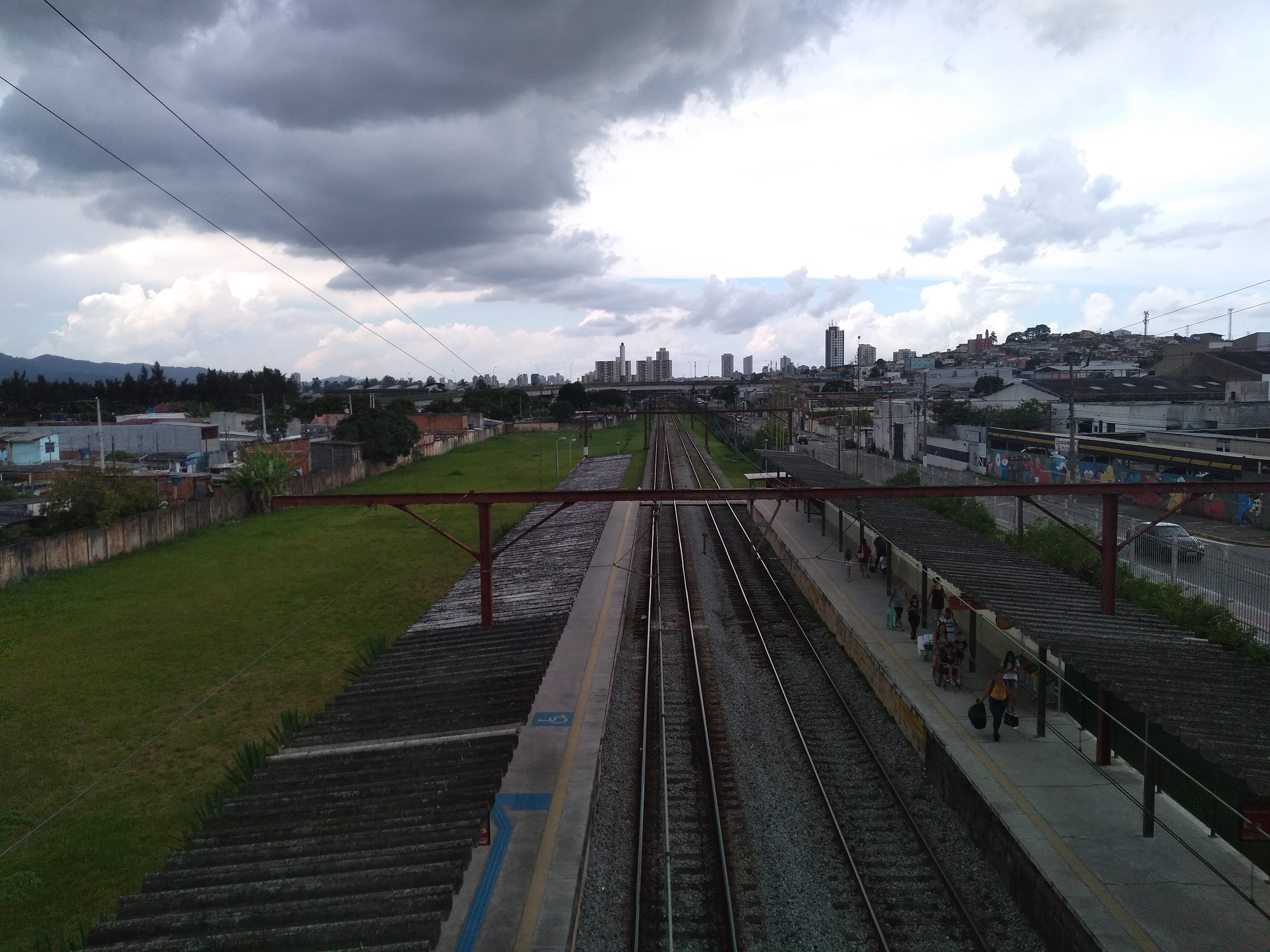
- View of the platforms of Braz Cubas station.

General information
- Location: Av. Anchieta, s/n Vila Socorro Velho; Brazil
- Coordinates: 23.536212°S 46.225142°W
- Owner: Government of the State of São Paulo
- Operator: CPTM
- Platforms: Side platforms

Construction
- Structure type: Surface

Other information
- Station code: BCB

History
- Opened: 13 September 1929
- Former names: Brás Cubas

Services
| Preceding station | São Paulo Metropolitan Trains | Following station |
|---|---|---|
| Jundiapeba towards Palmeiras-Barra Funda | Line 11 | Mogi das Cruzes towards Estudantes |
Track layout
Location

Braz Cubas is a train station on CPTM Line 11-Coral, located in the city of Mogi das Cruzes. Built next to Avenida Anchieta, the station in close to the commercial center of the district of Brás Cubas, the most populous in Mogi.

== History ==
Braz Cubas station was opened by EFCB as a telegraph post on 20 August 1914. Since 1994, it is operated by CPTM.

The station was a scene of a national commotion crime: on 8 December 2003, two youngsters were thrown through the windows of a train that was leaving Braz Cubas station by 3 skinheads. One of the youngsters died and the other one lost his arm.
