= Calmon Viana (CPTM) =

Railway station in São Paulo, Brazil

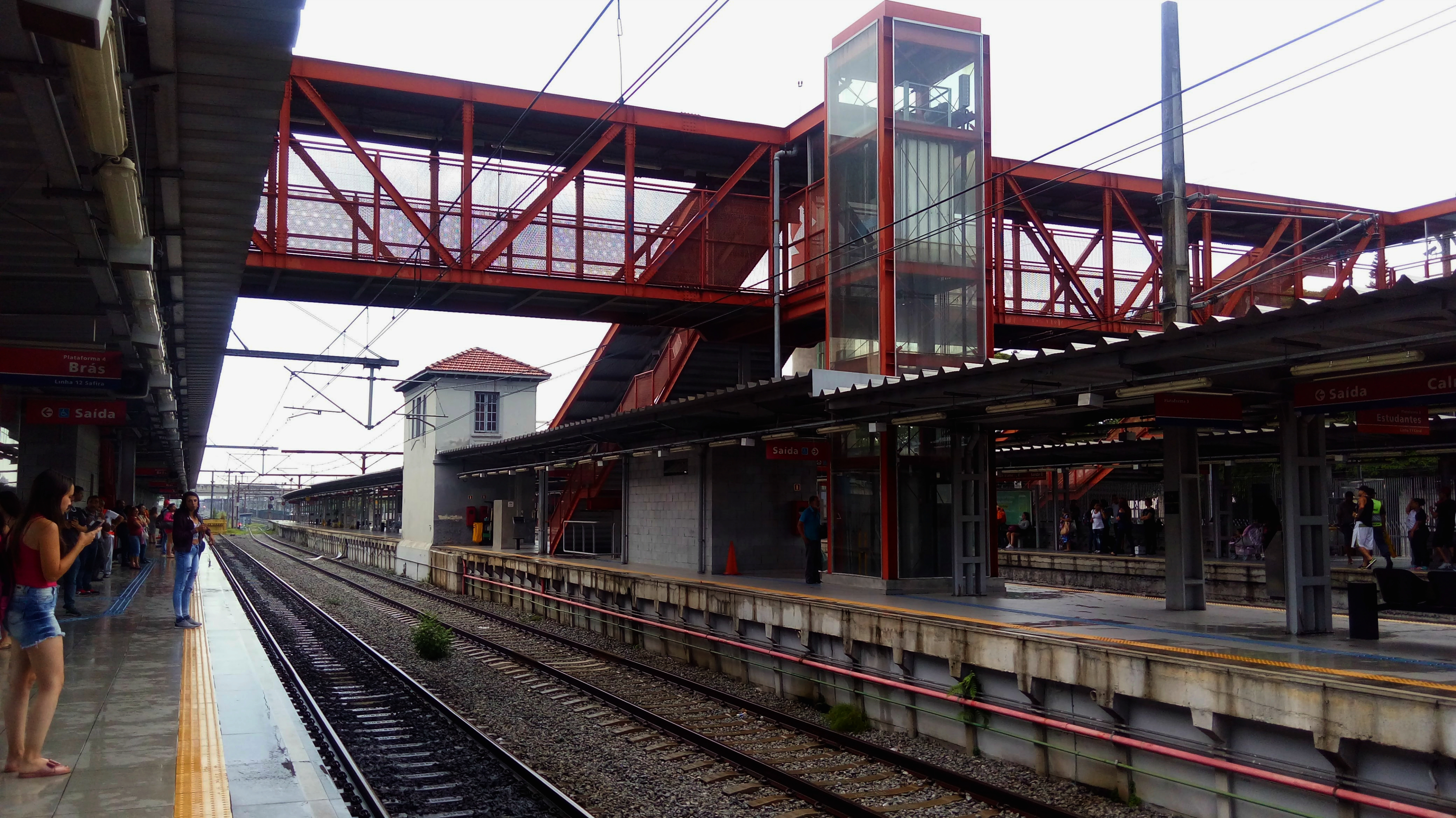
- View of the station from Line 12 Platform 2 during rain in 2018.

General information
- Location: Av. Brasil, 198; Calmon Viana; Brazil
- Coordinates: 23.525436°S 46.332623°W
- Owner: Government of the State of São Paulo
- Operator: CPTM
- Platforms: Island and side platforms Cross-platform interchange

Construction
- Structure type: Surface

Other information
- Station code: CMV

History
- Opened: 3 May 1924
- Rebuilt: 15 October 2010

Services
Preceding station	São Paulo Metropolitan Trains	Following station
Poá towards Palmeiras-Barra Funda	Line 11	Suzano towards Estudantes
Aracaré towards Brás	Line 12	Terminus
Track layout
Location

Calmon Viana is a train station on CPTM Lines Line 11-Coral and 12-Sapphire, located in Calmon Viana, district of Poá.

== History ==
Built along with Variante de Poá by EFCB on 7 February 1926, only was opened with the branch on 1 January 1934. It was named after the assistant engineer of the 5th Division of EFCB, Antonio Calmon Viana. Before being operated by CPTM, the station was administrated by other state companies: EFCB, RFFSA, EBTU and CBTU) which were, at the time, responsible for the lines.

For decades, it kept the original structure and not passing by any great reform, what caused too much time of discomfort to commuters because of an old and outdated structure, lacking accessibility items.

On 15 October 2010, the station was reopened after a great reform that preserved the main building, modernized the station infrastructure with the installing of a new metallic catwalk; elevators, restrooms and modern signaling for disabled people; public restrooms and bike parking; besides many improvements in visual communication. A new platform was built, the fourth of the station. In the station opening ceremony, a new train was delivered for Line 12-Sapphire. Many authorities were present, like Governor of São Paulo Alberto Goldman, Mayor of Poá Francisco Pereira de Souza, and Chairman of CPTM Sérgio Avelleda.

After the reform, a gradual increase of boardings occurred, being the only transference catwalk overloaded. In some moments, unhappy commuters chose to change platforms by crossing the tracks. After many complaints reached the Legislative Assembly, State Deputy Marcos Damasio (PL) requested to the CPTM, through the Indication No. 1492/2019, the install of a second transference catwalk between the platforms.

== Toponymy ==
Antônio Vicente Calmon Viana was born in Bahia on 12 April 1867, grandson of Francisco Vicente Viana, 1st Baron of Rio das Contas. Joined the Politechnical School of the University of Brazil, graduating in Engineering. After acting in railways in Pernambuco, joined EFCB in 1895. Worked as division assistant in 1914. Died on 2 June 1923. In his memory, a little station located in the district of Poá was named Calmon Viana.

== Characteristics ==
Belongs to CPTM Lines 11-Coral and 12-Sapphire, being the terminus of the last one. Along with it, there is a rail yard used by CPTM as support for maintenance services and composition maneuver, besides an energy substation made by EFCB. The current building was reformed in 2010, preserved the original structure, and added a new platform to the station. It's totally adapted to people with disabilities and also has a bike parking lot.
