= Ferraz de Vasconcelos (CPTM) =

Railway station in São Paulo, Brazil

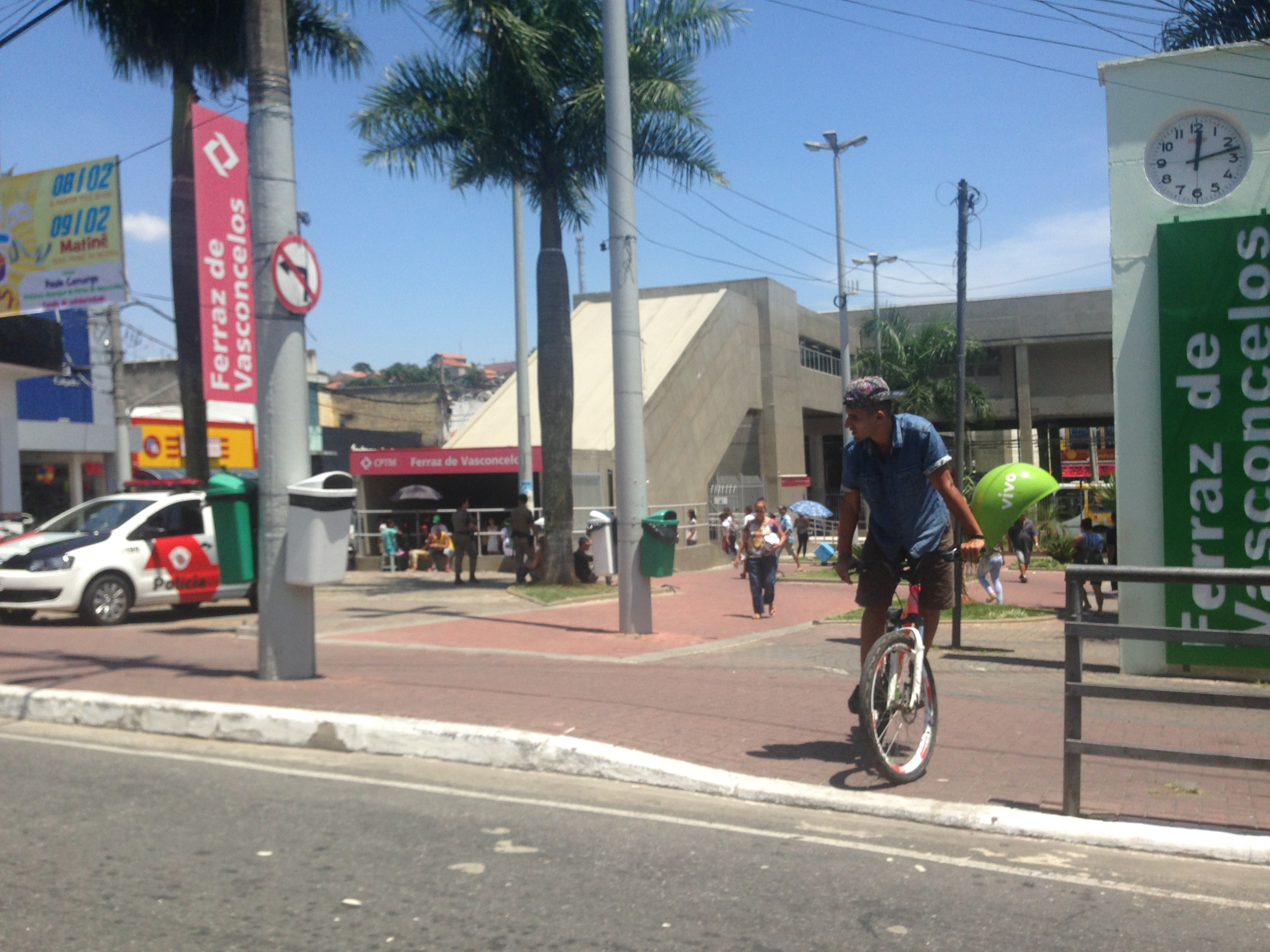
- Entrance of the station, along with Praça da Independência.

General information
- Location: R. Ver. Diomar Novaes, s/n Centro; Brazil
- Coordinates: 23.540998°S 46.368731°W
- Owner: Government of the State of São Paulo
- Operator: CPTM
- Platforms: Side platforms (1926–2011); Island platform (2015–present)
- Connections: Ferraz de Vasconcelos Bus Terminal

Construction
- Structure type: Surface

Other information
- Station code: FVC

History
- Opened: 27 July 1926
- Closed: 3 September 2011
- Rebuilt: 27 August 2015

Services
Preceding station	São Paulo Metropolitan Trains	Following station
Antonio Gianetti Neto towards Palmeiras-Barra Funda	Line 11	Poá towards Estudantes
Track layout
Location

Ferraz de Vasconcelos is a train station on CPTM Line 11-Coral, located in the city of Ferraz de Vasconcelos.

== History ==
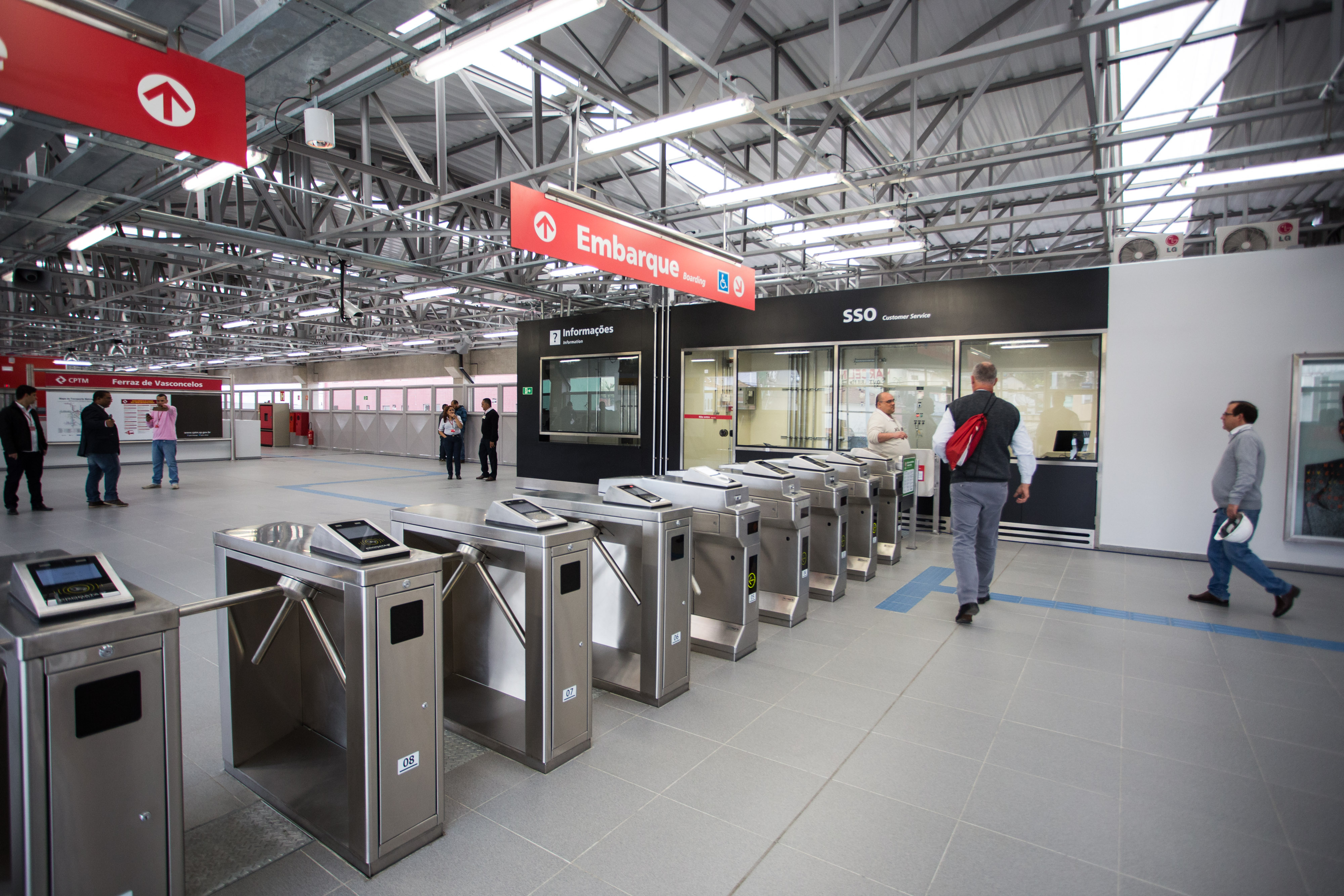
Ticket gates area and station mezzanine, after its rebuilt.

The station was built by Santa Branca Farm, owner of Romanópolis company and delivered to Estrada de Ferro Central do Brasil (EFCB) on 29 July 1926. It was named Ferraz de Vasconcelos after José Ferraz de Vasconcellos, chief of 2nd Traffic District of EFCB, who died in 1924. The station gave rise to the homonymous city, and in 1944 received a new building, which was reformed and delivered by RFFSA on 27 August 1983. In 1994, the station was transferred to CPTM.

=== Projects ===
CPTM is currently modernizing its lines, in which was included the rebuilt of Ferraz de Vasconcelos station. In mid-2011, a temporary station was built, which was working on September of the same year and the old one was demolished months later. However, the construction had been practically on hold for a year.

The temporary station, built beside a brook, was target of complaint because of technical irregularities in technical rules, as steps size, extensive stairs, and catwalk and platforms made of wood. Initially, the deliver date was scheduled to the end of 2012, but CPTM only opened it on 26 August 2015, 3 year later.
