= FVC =

FVC may refer to:

- Fair Vote Canada, an electoral reform advocacy group in Canada
- Ferraz de Vasconcelos (CPTM), a railway station in Brazil
- Financial vehicle corporation in the European Union
- Fingerprint Verification Competition
- FIRST Vex Challenge, a high school robotics competition
- Forced vital capacity
- Fortuneo–Vital Concept, a French cycling team
- Forth Valley College in Scotland
- Fraser Valley College, now the University of the Fraser Valley, in British Columbia, Canada
