= Guaianases (CPTM) =

Railway station in São Paulo, Brazil

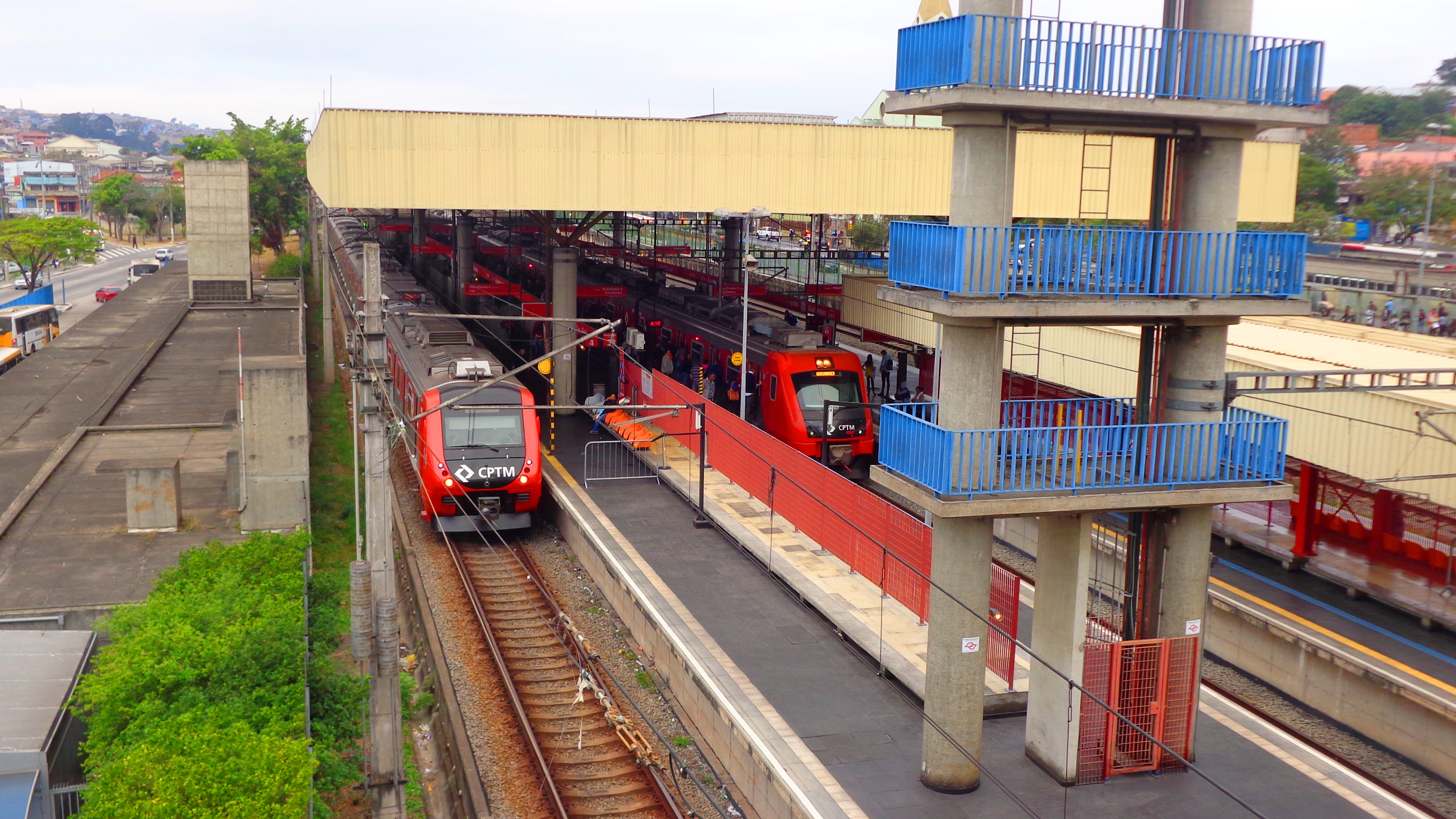

General information
- Location: Av. Salvador Gianetti, s/n Guaianases; Brazil
- Coordinates: 23.542316°S 46.415584°W
- Owner: Government of the State of São Paulo
- Operator: CPTM
- Platforms: Island platforms
- Connections: Guaianases Bus Terminal

Construction
- Structure type: Surface

Other information
- Station code: GUA

History
- Opened: 27 May 2000

Services
Preceding station	São Paulo Metropolitan Trains	Following station
José Bonifácio towards Palmeiras-Barra Funda	Line 11	Antonio Gianetti Neto towards Estudantes
Track layout
Location

Guaianases is a train station on CPTM Line 11-Coral, located in the limits between Lajeado and Guaianases districts, both in the East Side São Paulo.

== History ==
In 1987, Governor-elect Orestes Quércia orders to the São Paulo Metropolitan Company a study about the expansion of Metro East-West Line towards Guaianazes. The study results say that just a line expansion would cause its collapse because of overcrowding, indicating that the ideal solution would be revitalize the railway administrated by CBTU. Contradicting studies, Quércia launched the construction on 14 October of that same year. In that moment, the state of São Paulo was in debt with the Brazilian Development Bank (BNDES), causing the constructions to be put on hold until May 1988, when they were resumed. Construction was stopped many times, with the state priorizing the construction of Metro Paulista Branch, until they were completely abandoned in 1992, during Governor Fleury's administration.

In 1995, in Covas administration, construction was resumed by CPTM, which had financial conditions to assume the construction financial with BNDES, being opened on 27 May 2000.

=== Project ===
Although its modern conception station, Guaianases doesn't have escalators and elevators, getting complaints from the commuters. Between 2012 and 2014, CPTM hired GP Sistran company to make the basic and executive project for the installing of these equipments. Although the Guaianases accessibility project was signed in to PAC Mobilidade, CPTM had their request denied because of the Brazilian economic crisis, so the project was archived for now.
