= Dom Bosco (CPTM) =

Railway station in São Paulo, Brazil

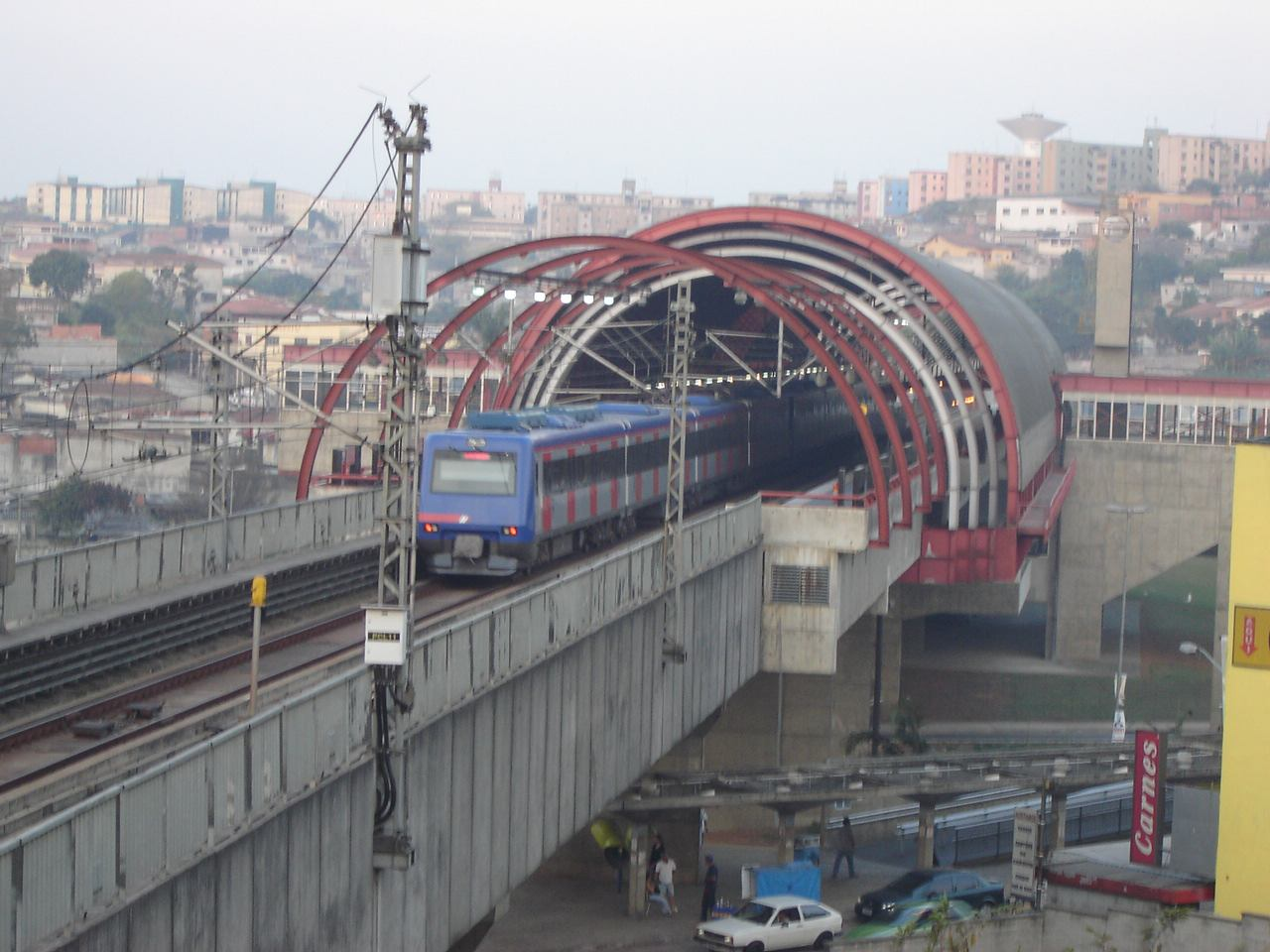
- A train arriving at the station.

General information
- Location: Rua Sábbado D'Angelo, 1024; Itaquera; Brazil
- Coordinates: 23.541873°S 46.448216°W
- Owner: Government of the State of São Paulo
- Operator: CPTM
- Platforms: Side platforms

Construction
- Structure type: Elevated
- Architect: João Toscano and Odiléa Toscano

Other information
- Station code: DBO

History
- Opened: 27 April 2000
- Former names: Pêssego

Services
Preceding station	São Paulo Metropolitan Trains	Following station
Corinthians-Itaquera towards Palmeiras-Barra Funda	Line 11	José Bonifácio towards Estudantes
Track layout
Location

Dom Bosco is a train station on CPTM Line 11–Coral, located in the city of São Paulo. It was named for its proximity to the acting area of Dom Bosco Social Work.

== History ==
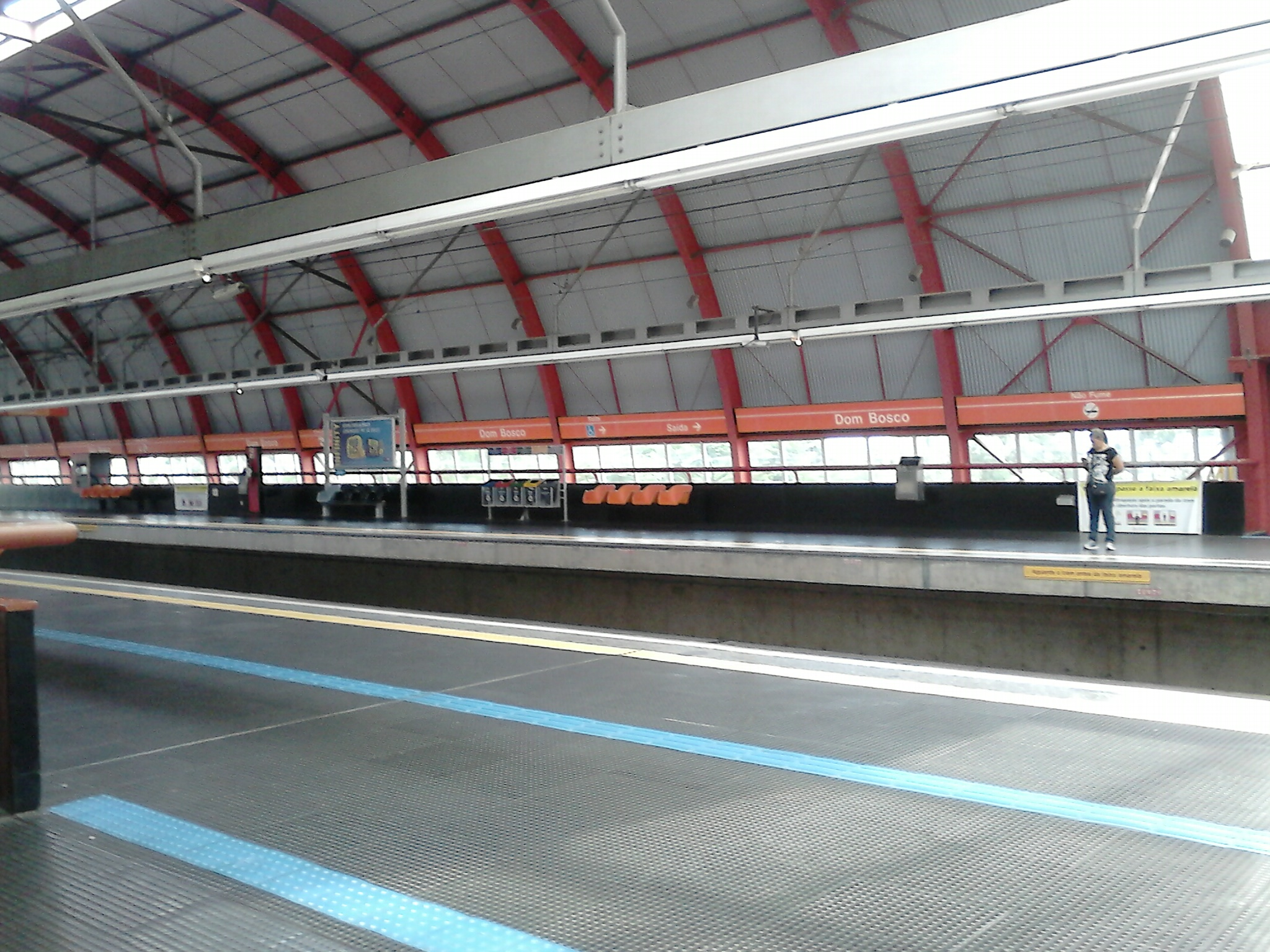
Platform of the station

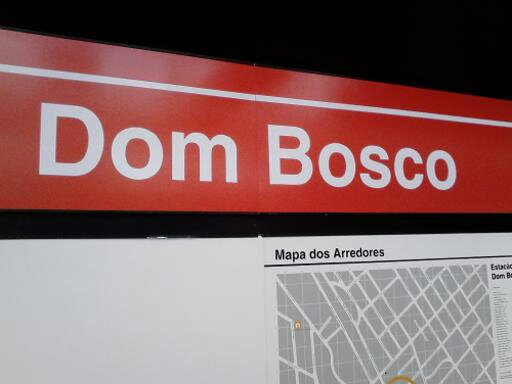
Sign of the station name

In mid-1987, São Paulo Metro hired a study for the expansion of East-West Line from Itaquera to Guaianazes. The study did not recommend the extension of the line due to the risk of collapse caused by overcrowding, but Quércia administration started the construction of the branch (called East Extension) in November 1987. The construction included Pêssego, José Bonifácio and Guaianazes stations and were made by constructor Andrade Gutierrez. Shortly after, the construction were put on hold by Metro for lack of BNDES financing, which claimed for Metro debt in the paying of other financings. The work of East Extension, originally scheduled to end in 1991, went past its deadline, and was stopped in 1992 during Fleury administration.

In 1995, during Covas administration, São Paulo Government renegotiated the construction contracts. Pêssego station construction was resumed by constructor Constran, with the work supervision transferred from the Metro to the CPTM. On 25 May 2000, the station, renamed to Dom Bosco, was opened and integrated to the CPTM network.

== Toponymy ==
Toponymic studies coordinated by Metro in the end of 1980s concluded that the new station show be named Pêssego, for crossing the old Peach Road. Until 1998, the name Pêssego was used to call the station. In 1998, State Deputies Walter Feldman (PSDB), Roberto Gouveia (PT), Ricardo Tripoli (PSDB) and Vitor Sapienza (PMDB) elaborated projects and indication to rename Pêssego station to Dom Bosco, with the reason to pay tribute to Dom Bosco Social Work, and get votes from the local catholic community. Feldmans project (338/1998) was approved and became State Law 10,427/99.
