= Suzano (disambiguation) =

Suzano may refer to:

- Suzano, a municipality in São Paulo state, Brazil
- Suzano (CPTM), a train station in the city of Suzano
- Suzano massacre, a school shooting that took place on March 13, 2019
- Suzano Papel e Celulose, a Brazilian producer of paper and pulp
- Esporte Clube União Suzano, a Brazilian sports club
- União Suzano, a Brazilian football club
