= José Bonifácio (CPTM) =

Railway station in São Paulo, Brazil

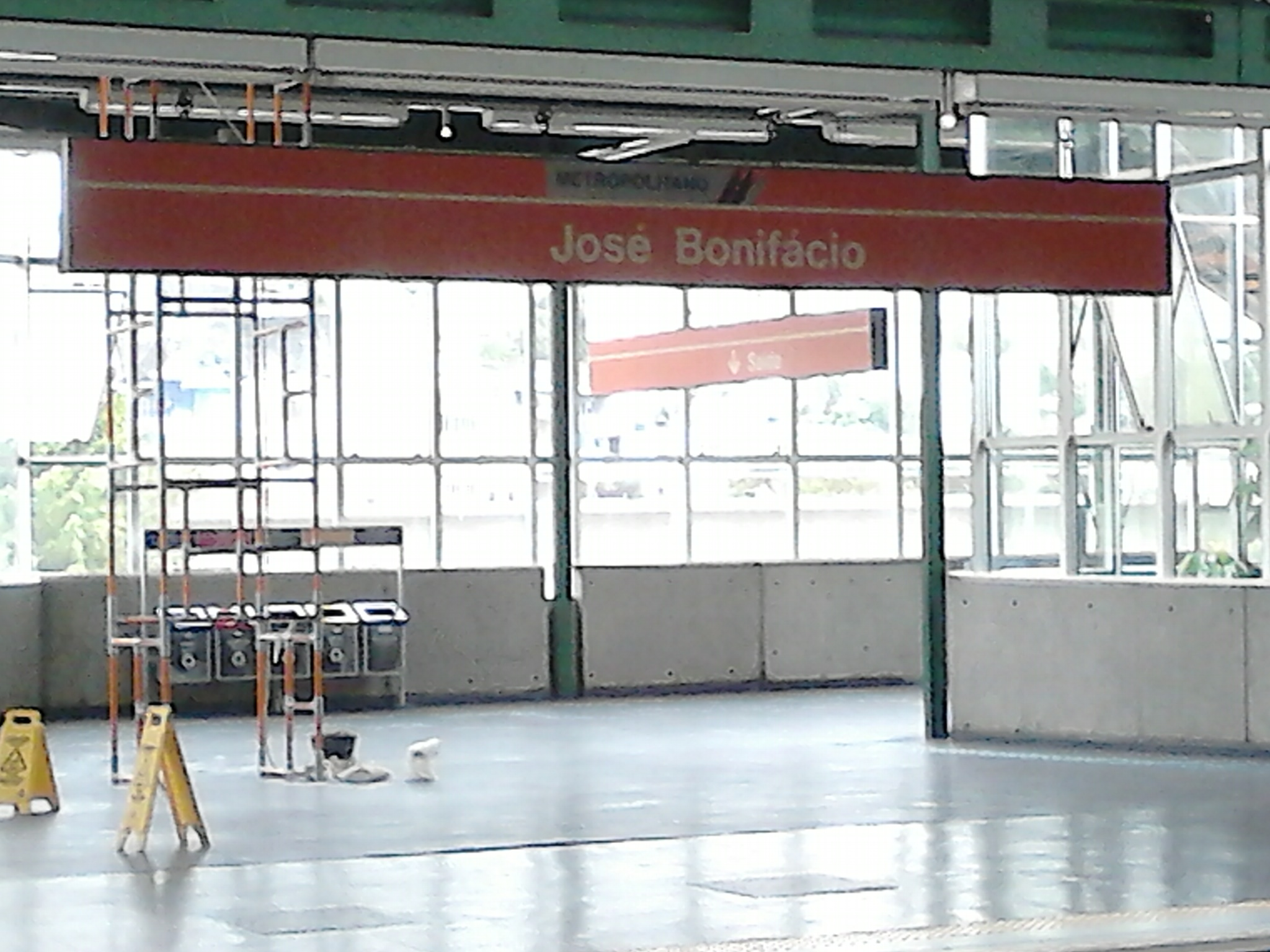

General information
- Location: Av. Nagib Farah Maluf, 1500; José Bonifácio; Brazil
- Coordinates: 23.542316°S 46.415584°W
- Owner: Government of the State of São Paulo
- Operator: CPTM
- Platforms: Side platforms

Construction
- Structure type: Elevated

Other information
- Station code: JBO

History
- Opened: 27 May 2000

Services
Preceding station	São Paulo Metropolitan Trains	Following station
Dom Bosco towards Palmeiras-Barra Funda	Line 11	Guaianases towards Estudantes
Track layout
Location

José Bonifácio is a train station on CPTM Line 11-Coral, located in the district of José Bonifácio, East Side of São Paulo. The station also has an integrated urban bus terminal with lines that attend Areas 3 (yellow) and 4 (red).

== History ==
José Bonifácio station originated in a controverse project for expansion of Metro East-West Line to Guaianazes, initiated in 1987. Although the studies of São Paulo Metropolitan Company didn't recommend the expansion of the line, Governor Quércia's administration started the construction anyway. Initiated in an official ceremony on 14 October 1987, the construction of José Bonifácio station was put on hold right after because of lack of funds, blocked by Brazilian Development Bank (BNDES) because of Metro debts with the bank. In May 1988, the construction work was resumed, but in slow motion, as the Metro priority was the Paulista Branch. After a slow progress, the station construction was put on hold again in 1992.

The construction was only resumed in 1995, when they were transferred to CPTM, which could renegotiate the loan with BNDES. The station was opened on 27 May 2000.
