= Luz Station =

Railway station in São Paulo, Brazil

Luz Station Estação da Luz
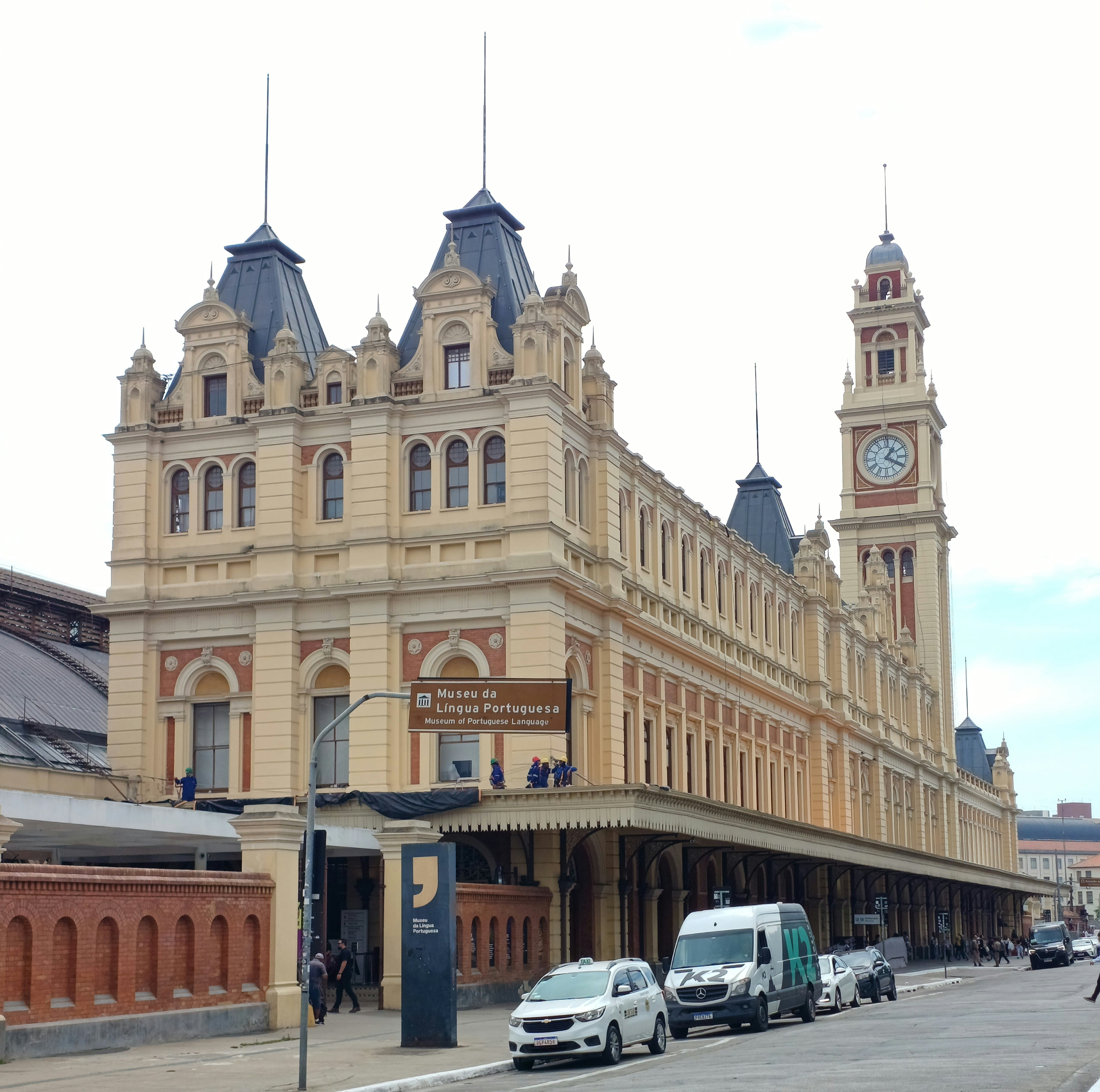
- Luz Station building.

General information
- Location: Praça da Luz 1 Bom Retiro, São Paulo; Brazil
- Coordinates: 23°32′6″S 46°38′7″W
- System: Commuter rail and Intercity rail
- Owner: Government of São Paulo
- Operator: CPTM
- Platforms: 5
- Connections: Line 1 (São Paulo Metro) Line 4 (São Paulo Metro)

Construction
- Accessible: true
- Architect: Charles Henry Driver

Other information
- Station code: LUZ

History
- Opened: 16 February 1867

Services
Preceding station	São Paulo Metropolitan Trains	Following station
Palmeiras-Barra Funda Terminus	Line 10	Brás towards Rio Grande da Serra
Palmeiras-Barra Funda Terminus	Line 11	Brás towards Estudantes
Palmeiras-Barra Funda Terminus	Line 13-Airport Express	Guarulhos-CECAP towards Aeroporto–Guarulhos
Jundiaí Terminus	Touristic Express	Terminus
Terminus	Touristic Express	Mogi das Cruzes Terminus
Terminus	Touristic Express	Pref. Celso Daniel-Santo André towards Paranapiacaba
Out-of-system interchange
Preceding station	São Paulo Metro	Following station
Tiradentes towards Tucuruvi	Line 1	São Bento towards Jabaquara
Terminus	Line 4	República towards Luz
Transfer at: Luz (São Paulo Metro)

National Historic Heritage of Brazil
- Designated: 1976
- Reference no.: 944
Location
- Location within São Paulo Location within Brazil

Luz Station (Portuguese: Estação da Luz, IPA: [(i)staˈsɐ̃w dɐ ˈlus]) is a commuter rail and intercity rail station in the Bom Retiro district of São Paulo, Brazil, serving RFFSA, the intercity rail network of Brazil, CPTM Line 10-Turquoise, Line 11-Coral and Line 13-Jade (Airport Express). It has subway connections to São Paulo Metro Line 1-Blue and ViaQuatro Line 4-Yellow via its underground metro station of the same name.

It is currently located in Bairro da Luz and was built between 1895 and 1901, designed by the British architect Charles Henry Driver for the São Paulo Railway, a company based in London that was responsible for building the first railway line in the state of São Paulo, connecting the port of Santos to the city of Jundiaí.

The station houses the Museum of the Portuguese Language, established in 2006. The Luz Metro station is also located within the complex.

== History ==
The station was built in the late 19th century with the purpose of being the headquarters of the newly founded São Paulo Railway. In the first decades of the 20th century, it was the main entrance to the city, a fact that gave it a major economic relevance, because the majority of the coffee from Santos was delivered in the station, along with the imported supplies. At the time of the station's construction in the mid-nineteenth century, the Luz neighborhood was characterized by a large embankment that connected the city's downtown area to the Grande Bridge. It also had a botanical garden, which was enlarged by the Governor João Teodoro Xavier de Matos, and would serve as the future home of Luz station.

Land for the station was earmarked from the Botanical Garden Square, though its exact location was not confirmed until 1865. With the support of construction engineer Daniel Fox, superintendent J.J. Aubertin requested to the governor that the station be constructed on the corner of Rua Brigadeiro Tobias, where the current metro station now stands. He also requested that construction follow the previous plans created by the inspector engineer Vasco de Medeiros; otherwise, the station would be displaced to the other side of the Botanical Garden, and two gates would need to be installed to serve Rua Alegre and Rua Constituição. If the station were to be constructed beside the current subway station, however, the installation of one gate would be sufficient to serve both streets.

The initial station building was a small, one-story block. Dispatch facilities, facilities for boarding and arrival, and the residence of the station chief were located inside the station, while buildings for line administration, company engineering, building repairs, and supplies storage were built outside.

On 17 March 1888, station expansion was proposed, leading to the construction of the "second" Luz station. Passenger platforms were expanded and the edifice renovated. After construction, another story was added, bringing the station's height to two stories. The edifice was rebuilt in the neoclassical style and an iron cover was installed over the entrance of the building and the platforms. In 1900, Alfredo Moreira Pinto described the second Luz station as follows:

[The station] currently occupies a building with a recessed central body, three windows and two doors on the second floor, three windows and a front porch on the first floor, and two salient side bodies with four windows each, with one on the second floor and the other on the first floor. In the central body, the lobby and the ticket office are located on the first floor, and the traffic distribution is located on the 2nd floor. Beside the lobby, there is the post office, a ladies' room and, in front of it, a bar. In the back of the building is an extensive platform with the station chief's office, the telegraph, and many cargo bays.

— Alfredo Moreira Pinto

This building was maintained until the beginning of the twentieth century, when it was demolished for the construction of the third Luz station.

The current building was finished in 1901. The materials for its construction were brought from UK. The station was designed and produced by Walter Macfarlane & Co. Saracen Foundry, Glasgow. The station was assembled in Glasgow, then disassembled and sent to São Paulo where it was reassembled. The building was designed by the British architect Henry Driver.

=== Fire ===
- In 1946, the station caught fire and during the rebuilding process, a new floor was added to the building. Since then, the rail transport in Brazil started to decline, the same happened with the Luz neighbourhood. Both factors led to the degradation of the station. However, in the 1990s, the station was repaired.
- On 21 December 2015, the station suffered a major fire that started at the Museum of the Portuguese Language. The fire devastated the station's major building, and claimed one firefighter life.

== Cultural influence ==
The station is a remnant from the period when the coffee was a major source of income to the city. For many years, the station's clock tower dominated the city landscape, and for a time, served as the basis for clock adjustment in the city. It was destroyed in a fire in 1946 but was replaced five years later.

At its height, in the early 20th century, when the Luz neighbourhood was an important part of the city, the station was part of an architectonic block that was a major reference inside the city. The station helped to build the city's image.

The station, along with the nearby São Paulo Picture Gallery, marks the boundaries of the Bom Retiro and Campos Elíseos districts. Until the 1970s, a monument to Ramos de Azevedo, the architect responsible for designing many buildings in the area, including the Picture Gallery, stood near the station. The monument was later removed during the construction of the São Paulo Metro.

== Services ==
Until 2010, Luz station served as * terminus for CPTM's Line 10-Turquoise. However, after the completion of track improvement works, the line was extended to Brás station. As a result, a platform was left vacant in Luz, allowing Line 7 to now use two platforms – one for boarding and another for disembarking.

Luz station has the second-highest traffic level of all stations on São Paulo's metro-rail network, serving 147,000 passengers per day. Only Brás station, with 150,000 passengers, is more frequented.

Several improvement works were undertaken during the station's recent history, including the construction of an underground transfer gallery below the CPTM tracks. Even so, however, there are concerns that the current Luz station will soon become inadequate as passenger loads grow. This would be exacerbated by planned increases in train frequency at Luz thanks to the future deactivation of Julio Prestes station on Line 8–Diamond and the installation of communications-based train control on Line 11.

The current Luz station is under railway heritage protection, meaning that it cannot be expanded in the future.

=== Touristic Express ===
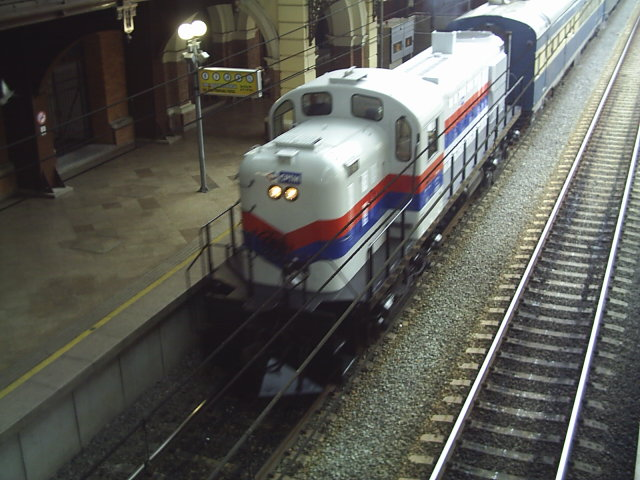
The Touristic Express in test phase.

Since 2009, Luz has been the terminus of the Touristic Express line, a touristic line that makes trips from Luz to Paranapiacaba and Jundiai. It uses diesel locomotives which carry a maximum of 170 people and travel at maximum speeds of 40 kilometres per hour (25 mph).

The Express connects tourists to São Paulo's "Fruit Circuit", which is a region known for its rural tourism and fruit production. Stations are located in the region's largest cities, namely Atibaia, Indaiatuba, Itatiba, Jarinu, Jundiaí, Louveira, Morungaba, Valinhos, Vinhedo, and the district of Paranapiacaba.

== Gallery ==
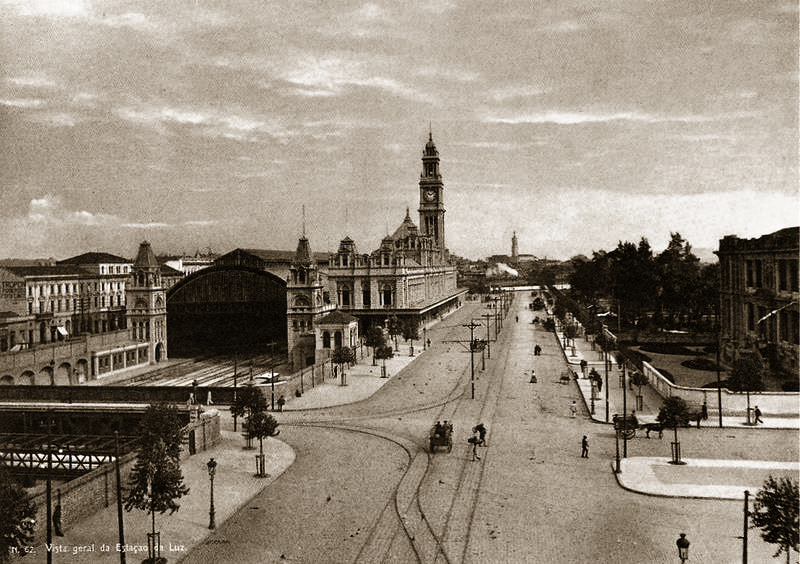
Station in 1900

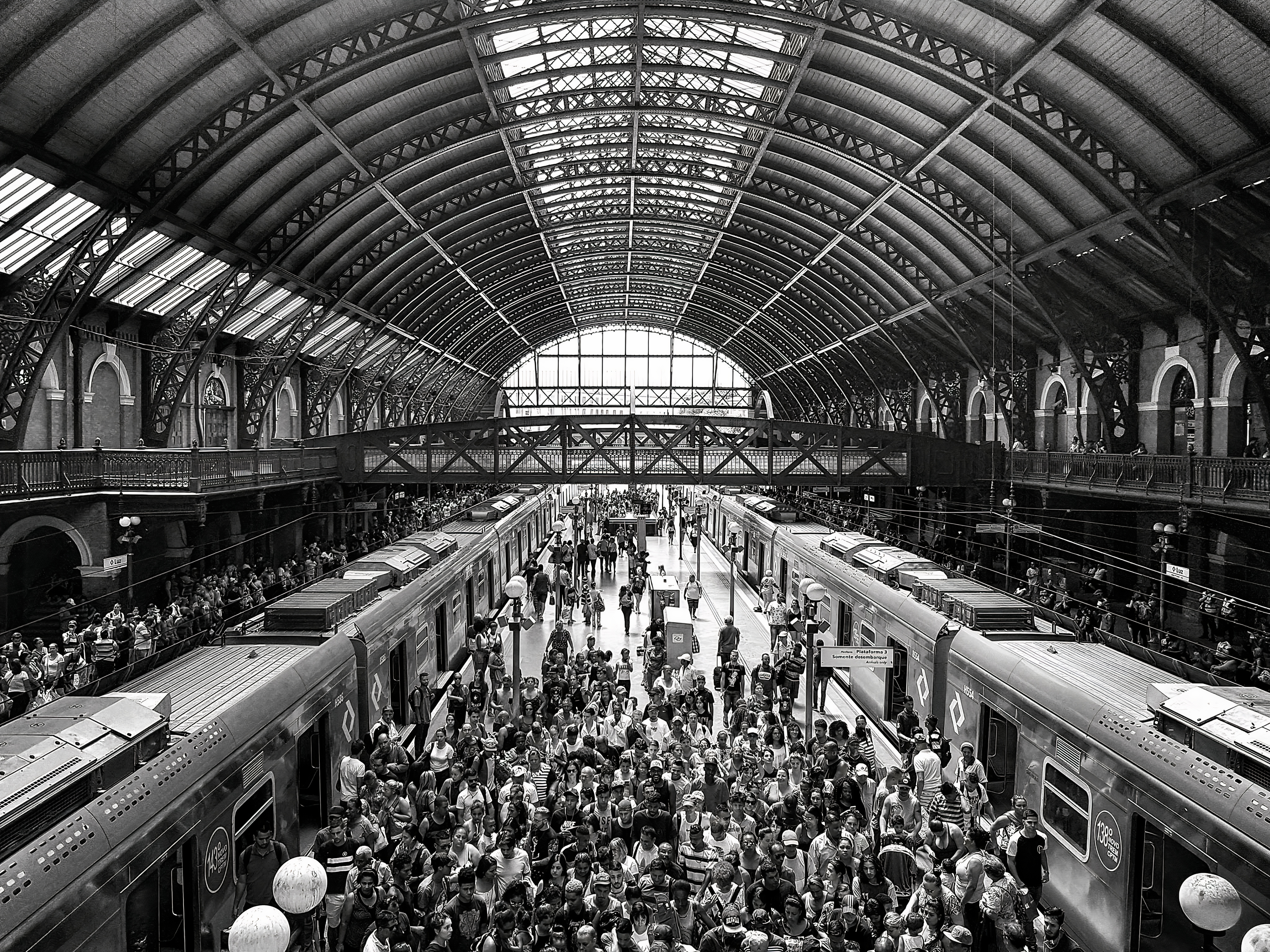
Interior

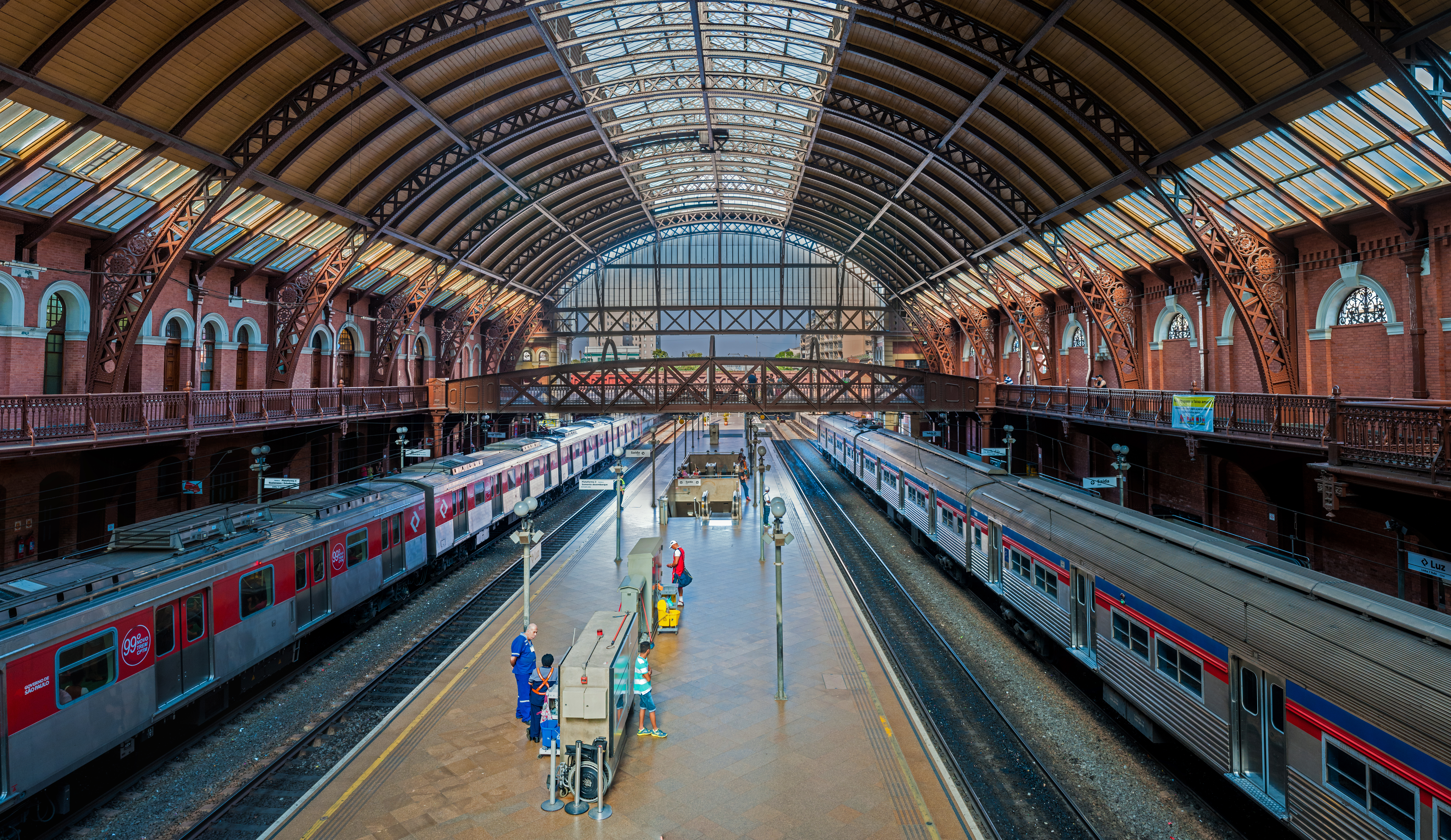
Interior of the station

== See also ==
- Museum of the Portuguese Language
- São Paulo Railway
- São Paulo Metro
- Companhia Paulista de Trens Metropolitanos
