= Edmilson (footballer, born 1974) =

Brazilian footballer

Personal information
- Full name: Edmilson Carlos Abel
- Date of birth: 23 February 1974 (age 52)
- Place of birth: Ferraz de Vasconcelos, Brazil
- Height: 1.77 m (5 ft 9 1/2 in)
- Position: Midfielder

Senior career*
Years	Team	Apps	(Gls)
1993–1998	Nacional		
1999	Paraguaçuense		
1999	Juventus		
2000	Mirassol		
2000	Juventude		
2001	Kawasaki Frontale		
2001	Rio Branco		
2002–2003	Avaí		
2003	Juventus		
2004	Santo André		
2004–2005	15 Novembro		
2005–2006	Internacional		
2006	Marília		
2007	Grêmio		
2007	Criciúma		
2007–2008	Caxias do Sul		
2008	15 Novembro		
2008–2009	Linense		
2009–2010	Veranópolis		
- * Club domestic league appearances and goals

Edmilson Carlos Abel (Ferraz de Vasconcelos born 23 February 1974) is a Brazilian footballer who last played as a midfielder for Veranópolis.

== Club statistics ==
Club performance			League		Cup		League Cup		Total	
Season	Club	League	Apps	Goals	Apps	Goals	Apps	Goals	Apps	Goals
Japan			League		Emperor's Cup		J.League Cup		Total	
2001	Kawasaki Frontale	J2 League	20	2	0	0	4	0	24	0
Total			20	2	0	0	4	0	24	0
