= Mogi das Cruzes (CPTM) =

Railway station in São Paulo, Brazil

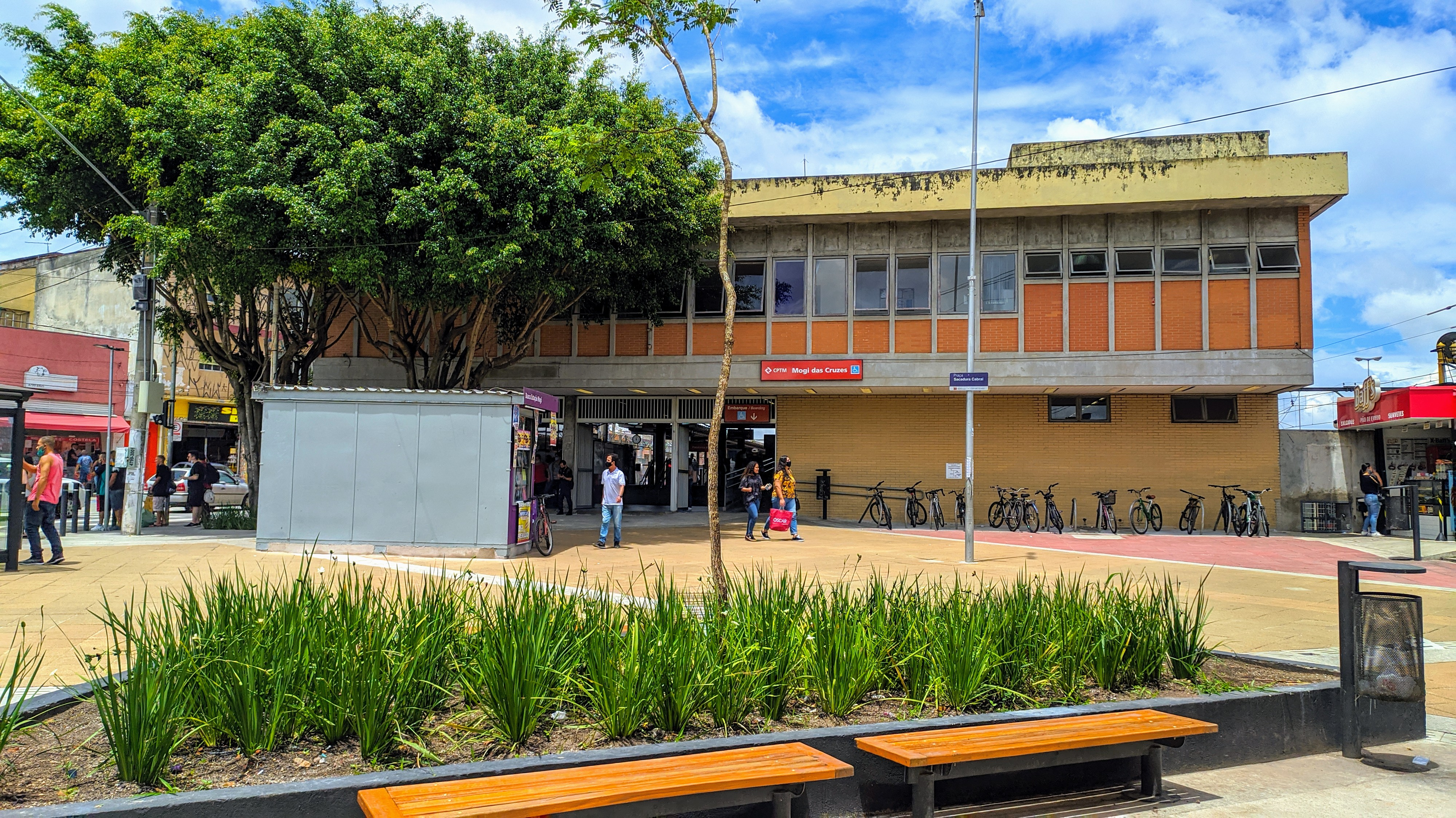
- View of main entrance of Mogi das Cruzes station.

General information
- Location: Praça Sacadura Cabral; Centro; Brazil
- Coordinates: 23.52111°S 46.196877°W
- Owner: Government of the State of São Paulo
- Operator: CPTM
- Platforms: 1 side platform and 3 island platforms
- Connections: São Paulo–Mogi das Cruzes Touristic Express; Central Bus Terminal

Construction
- Structure type: Surface

Other information
- Station code: MDC

History
- Opened: 6 November 1875
- Rebuilt: 20 August 1984

Services
Preceding station	São Paulo Metropolitan Trains	Following station
Braz Cubas towards Palmeiras-Barra Funda	Line 11	Estudantes Terminus
Luz Terminus	Touristic Express	Terminus
Track layout
Location

Mogi das Cruzes is a train station on CPTM Line 11-Coral, located in the district of Mogi das Cruzes.

== History ==
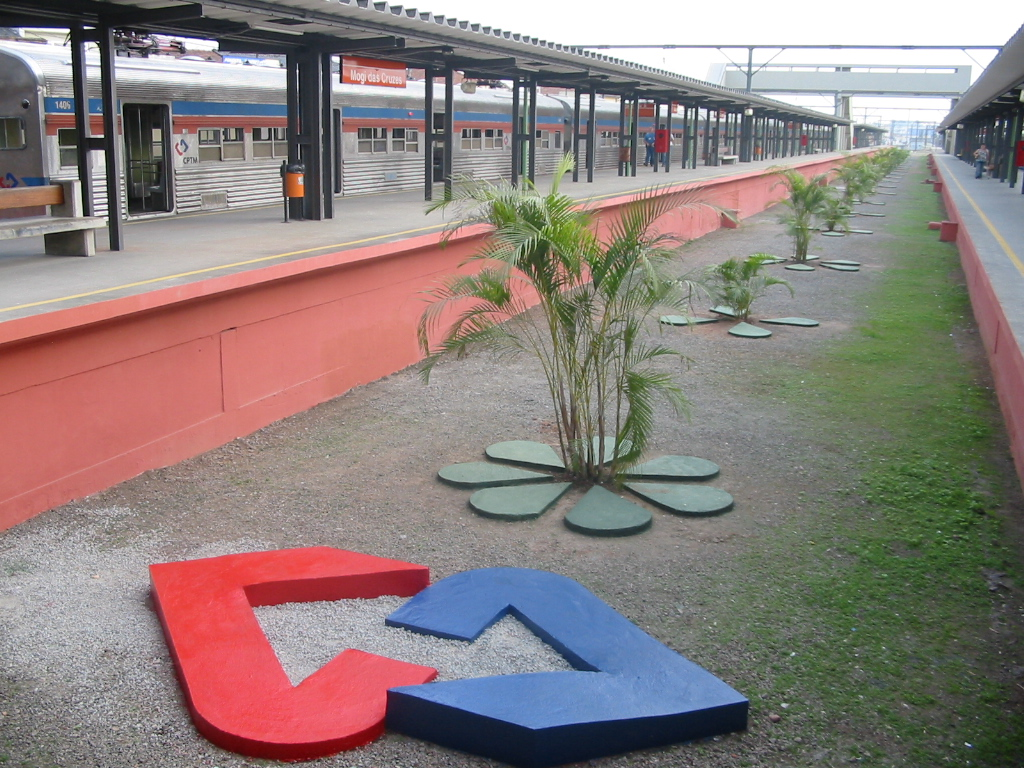
Old CPTM logo in the station's gardens.

Mogi das Cruzes station was built and opened by North Railway on 6 November 1875.

Due to the growing of the city of Mogi das Cruzes, EFCB built a new building, opened on 16 September 1929, as the place was a terminus for commuter trains of the "Central".

In the 1950s, it was expanded again, being reopened on 15 March 1958. The current station was built by RFFSA on 20 August 1984. Since 1994, it is operated by CPTM.
