= Suzano (CPTM) =

Railway station in São Paulo, Brazil

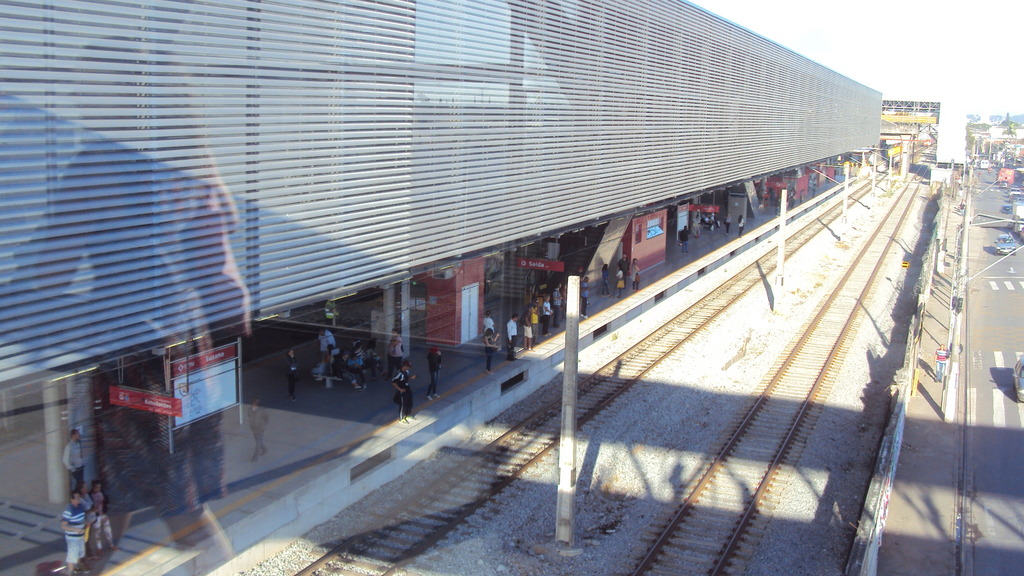
- View of the tracks on north side of the station.

General information
- Location: R. Prudente de Moraes, 473; Vila Amorim; Brazil
- Coordinates: 23.533729°S 46.309084°W
- Owner: Government of the State of São Paulo
- Operator: CPTM
- Platforms: Side platforms (1875–2013); Island platforms (2015–present)
- Connections: Suzano Bus Terminal

Construction
- Structure type: Surface

Other information
- Station code: SUZ

History
- Opened: 6 November 1875
- Opening: Unknown
- Closed: 26 January 2013
- Rebuilt: 11 February 2016
- Former names: Piedade; Concórdia; Guayó

Services
Preceding station	São Paulo Metropolitan Trains	Following station
Calmon Viana towards Palmeiras-Barra Funda	Line 11	Jundiapeba towards Estudantes
Future services
Calmon Viana towards Brás	Line 12	Terminus
Track layout
Location

Suzano is a train station on CPTM Line 11-Coral, located in the city of Suzano.

== History ==
=== Old history ===
The station was by of North Railway and was named Piedade stop, due to its proximity to Mercy Chapel, located in the village of Baruel. In 1879, Antonio Marques Figueira, considered one of the founders of the city, goes to the village and its growth starts, now named Concórdia, and, with that, a new station was necessary.

In the first decade of the 20th century, the wish of a new passenger station was reached after strong movement of local leaderships. The claims for better installations in the train stop were taken to the railway engineer Joaquim Augusto Suzano Brandão, who, after developing a solid study, attended the claims through the inclusion of the wished constructions in his work plan.

In 1894, the village receives a new station renamed as Guayó.

The new station was rebuilt in the same patterns of that time and, as a way to show the recognition for the services provided by Suzano Brandão, the residents accepted to rename the rail station with his name. In December 1907, Guayó station was renamed to Suzano station, a fair tribute to its idealizer.

EFCB operated the station until 1957, when it was incorporated to the Federal Railway Network, which built a new building in 1979. In 1994, the station was transferred to CPTM, along with the lines of the old CBTU.

=== Recent history ===
In the beginning of 2011, the construction work for the implantation of a new station started. However, they didn't last too much, as there were problems with estates expropriations, due to factors like indemnity, disturbed the work progress, delaying the delivery date for almost a year. In mid-2012, the temporary station was opened a little bit ahead from the old one, where the demolished houses were. On 27 January 2013, the old building was demolished, so the new one could be built in the same place. Initially, the deliver date of the new building was scheduled for December 2012, then to 2013, 2014, 2015, end of January 2016 and, finally, February 2016.

The new station was opened. after 9 delays, on 12 February 2016. On the same day, 6 more trains from East Express were incorporated to the line, raising in 20% the number of trains. With that, the number of daily direct travels to Guaianases were increased from 24 to 30.
