= Touristic Express =

Tourist train in Sao Paulo, Brazil

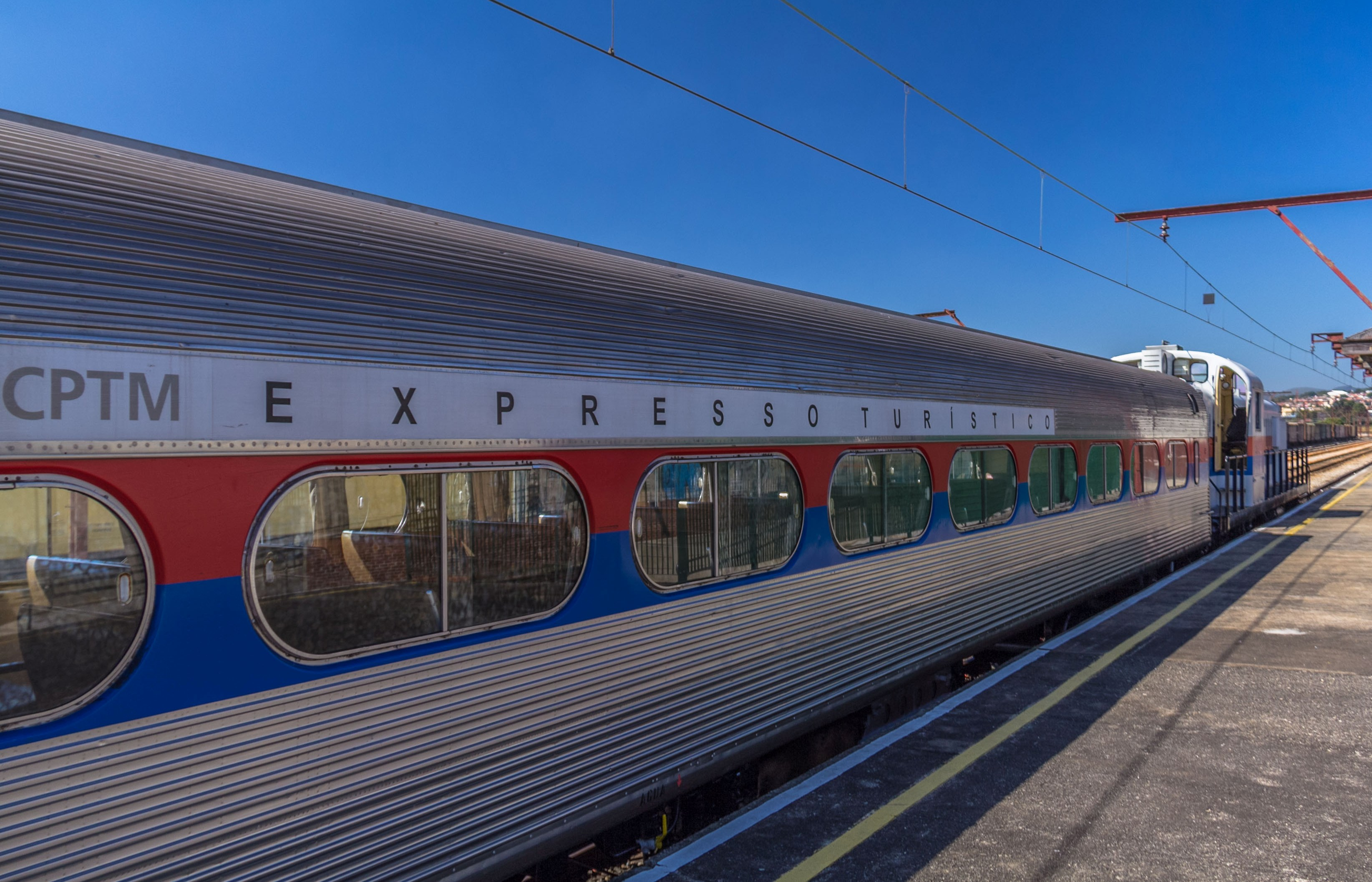

Overview
- Status: Operational
- Owner: Government of the State of São Paulo
- Locale: Greater São Paulo, Brazil
- Termini: Luz Station; Jundiaí, Mogi das Cruzes, or Paranapiacaba
- Stations: 5

Service
- Type: Commuter rail/Heritage railway
- System: São Paulo Metropolitan Trains
- Services: 3
- Operator(s): CPTM
- Ridership: 13,175 passengers (2018)

History
- Opened: 18 April 2009; 16 years ago

Technical
- Line length: 170 km (110 mi)
- Character: At-grade
- Track gauge: 1,600 mm (5 ft 3 in)
- Electrification: 3,000 V DC catenary
- Operating speed: 90 km/h (56 mph)
- Signalling: Automatic block signaling

The Touristic Express (Brazilian Portuguese: Expresso Turístico) is a service of the Companhia Paulista de Trens Metropolitanos, a tourist train that makes trips between Luz Station, in São Paulo, and Paranapiacaba, Mogi das Cruzes and Jundiaí, with the objective of showing and disseminating the history of railroads and trains, which boosted the capital and the cities that are part of the São Paulo railway network.

== Characteristics ==
The express forms a large tourist network along the CPTM lines, connecting the capital of São Paulo and the historic district of Paranapiacaba, in the Serra do Mar, in Santo André; with the Fruit Circuit in the interior of São Paulo, from the municipality of Jundiaí; and with the Flower Circuit in the municipality of Mogi das Cruzes.

The route is covered by ALCO RS-3 (6001 and 6004) and GE U20C (3157 and 3159) diesel-electric locomotives from CPTM, with custom paint and traveling at about 40 kilometers per hour. These drive Budd–Mafersa 800 stainless steel passenger cars for long distances, with a capacity of 88 and 87 people (PI 3253 and SI 3255), manufactured in 1962. The route to Mogi das Cruzes also has a bike rack with 45 positions.

These cars were provided by the National Department of Transport Infrastructure and belonged to the former EFA and Fepasa. Currently, two more passenger cars (SI 3254 and SI 3259) are under renovation to join the Express.

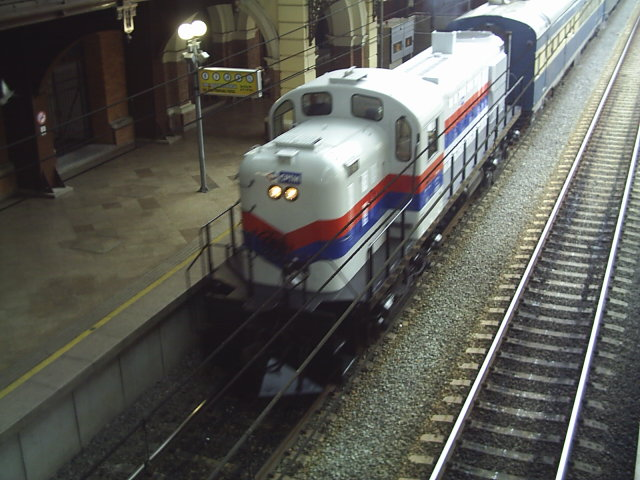
Expresso Turístico at Luz Station

== Passengers carried ==
From its creation until 2018, the Tourist Express transported more than 140 thousand passengers. However, the number of passengers is falling, as part of the tourism sector affected by the political-economic crisis in Brazil from 2014 to 2018:

Year	Passengers	Travel
2009	10,000	234
2010	15,000	234
2011	12,000	234
2012	17,000	104
2013	15,000	102
2014	15,000	102
2015	15,000	102
2016	14,000	102
2017	15,000	101
2018	13,000	99
2019	Not disclosed	Not disclosed

== Proposed routes ==
There were plans for four more new tourist routes, including one route connecting Luz to the city of São Roque, where there is the Wine Route (Portuguese: Roteiro do Vinho), and three others lasting a weekend:

- one connecting Luz to the climatic resort of Campos do Jordão, with a connection in the city of Pindamonhangaba, with a transfer to the Estrada de Ferro Campos do Jordão trains,
- one connecting Luz to the city of Aparecida do Norte, where there is the Basilica of Our Lady of Aparecida, and
- another route connecting Luz to the Santos coast, going down and up the Serra do Mar, in addition to serving the users of the Baixada Santista.

However, these projects depend on the authorization of ANTT, in addition to Rumo Logística (Luz/São Roque Section) and MRS Logística (Luz/Aparecida Section). However, none of these routes got off the ground.

Currently, CPTM is studying the concession of the Touristic Express to the private sector.

== See also ==
- Companhia Paulista de Trens Metropolitanos
- Associação Brasileira de Preservação Ferroviária
