= Poá =

- Municipality
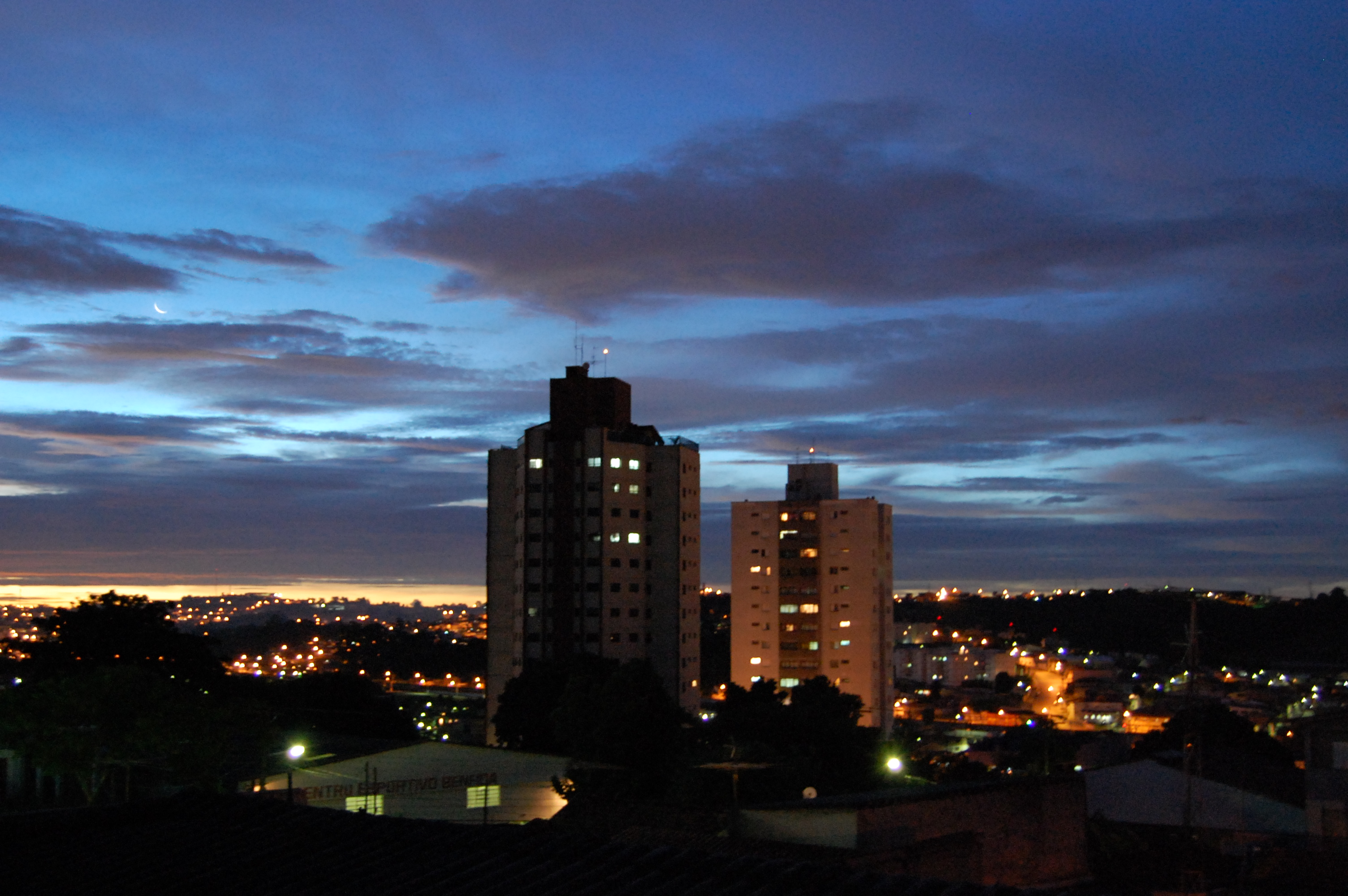

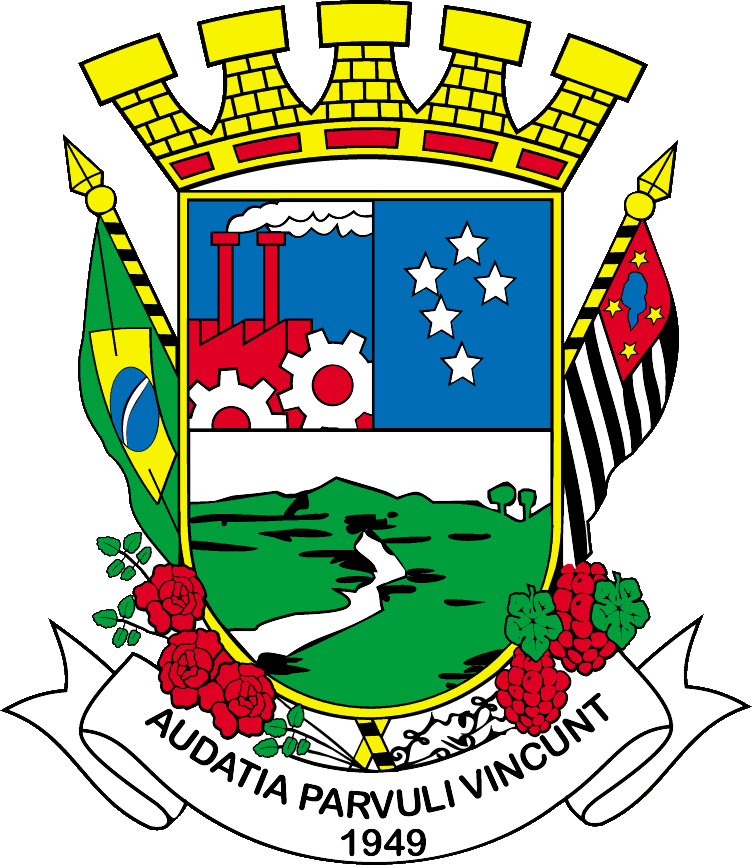
- Flag Coat of arms

- Location in São Paulo state

- Location in Brazil
- Coordinates: 23°31′43″S 46°20′42″W
- Country: Brazil
- Region: Southeast
- State: São Paulo

Government
  - Mayor: Giancarlo Lopes

Area
  - Total: 17.26 km^{2} (6.66 sq mi)
- Elevation: 822 m (2,697 ft)

Population (2022 Census)
  - Total: 103,765
  - Estimate (2025): 106,355
  - Density: 6,012/km^{2} (15,570/sq mi)
- Time zone: UTC−3 (BRT)
- Website: www.poa.sp.gov.br

Poá is a municipality in the state of São Paulo in Brazil. The water extracted from Fonte Áurea, or the Golden Fountain, is sold throughout Brazil. The population is 103,765 (2022 Census) in an area of 17.264 km^{2}.

== General appearance ==
Poá is one of the eleven municipalities in São Paulo considered to be spas by the state of São Paulo, as they meet certain prerequisites defined by state law. This status guarantees these municipalities a larger budget from the state for the development of regional tourism. In addition, the municipality acquires the right to add to its name the title of spa, a term by which it is designated both in official municipal records and in state references. The main sector of Poá's economy is services, since the installation of polluting industries was made difficult after 1970, the year in which it became a spa. In terms of territory, it is one of the smallest municipalities in the state of São Paulo (larger only than Águas de São Pedro and São Caetano do Sul). The verticalization of the city center is discouraged, with the aim of preserving the city's rural atmosphere, with narrow streets and the preservation of several old buildings.

== History ==
The municipality was created by state law in 1948.

Map of the state of São Paulo (1948).

Poá is one of eleven municipalities considered spa towns (Estancia Hidromineral) by the state of São Paulo, fulfilling certain prerequisites set by state law. This status ensures that these municipalities more money from the state to promote regional tourism and beyond that the city acquired the right to add the title "Estancia Hidromineral" to its name, a term which is designated by both the municipal expedient as the official state references. Poá's economy is mainly service-focused, since the installation of polluting industries has been banned since 1970, the year it became a spa town. Territory-wise, is one of the smallest municipalities in the state of São Paulo (only bigger than Aguas de São Pedro and São Caetano do Sul).

Verticalization in the city center is discouraged to preserve the small-town atmosphere of the city, with narrow streets and the preservation of several old buildings. The council is not the richest in the region, but still outperforms its neighbors in several social indicators, thus signaling that the economic growth of Poá is more equal and sustainable than in other cities, and that its population has a better quality of life due to public facilities (schools, parks and health units). In indexes like the human development index, the child development index and the index of development of basic education, Poá surpasses all municipalities. In 2007 it was considered one of the safest cities of São Paulo, specifically the 5th, behind only São Caetano do Sul, Barueri, Caieiras and Mogi das Cruzes.

== Geography ==
=== Climate ===
The climate of the city and across the metropolitan region of São Paulo, is subtropical. Little hot and rainy summer. Mild winters and sub. The average annual temperature is around 18C °, the coldest month is July (average of 14 °C) and the warmest is February (average of 22 °C). Annual rainfall is around 1400 mm.

== Demographics ==
- Urban area: 15,7 km ²
- Rural area: 03 km ²
- Infant mortality to 1 (per thousand): 14.0
- Life expectancy (years): 71.06
- Fertility rate (children per woman): 2.25
- Literacy: 94.31%
- Human Development Index: 0.806
- Human Development Index – Income: 0.726
- Human Development Index-M Longevity: 0.768
- Human Development Index-M Education: 0.925

== Tourism ==
Poá has a strong vocation for tourism, although this sector of the economy still is not the main activity of the municipality. Because of the lack of investment, the city hardly explores this market.

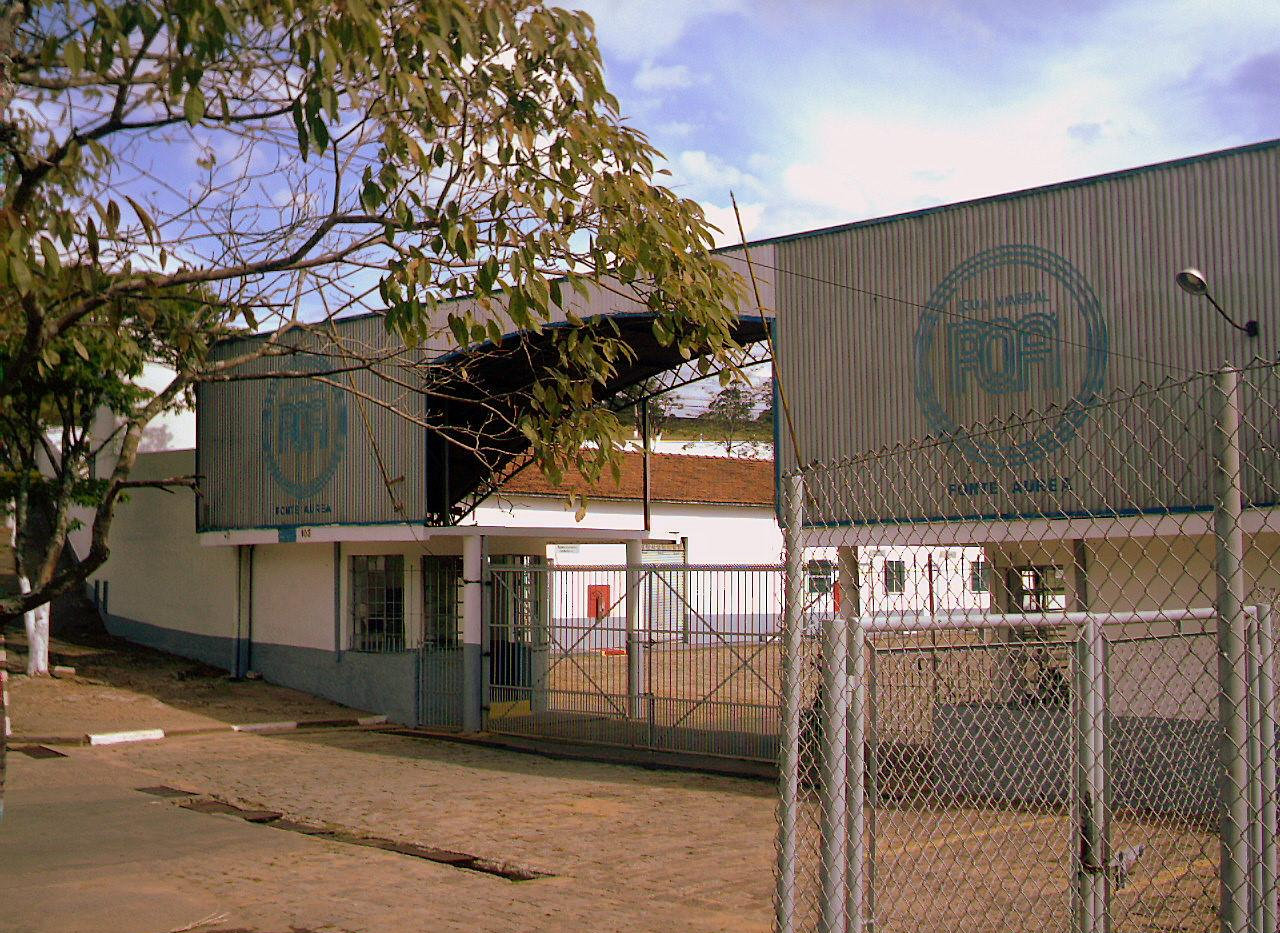
Facade of the Mineral Water Poá Company.

An example of a tourist attraction, is the municipal spa Vicente Leporace, located in front of the Fonte Aúrea, which was opened in 1970 as a condition for the council to receive the title of hidromineral and tourist resort. After being used for 30 years, it was deactivated at the beginning of the decade, because the mayor at the time, Eduardo Carlos Felippe, felt that there was no need to have a spa in the city. Since then the site is used as a physiotherapy center.

=== EXPOÁ ===
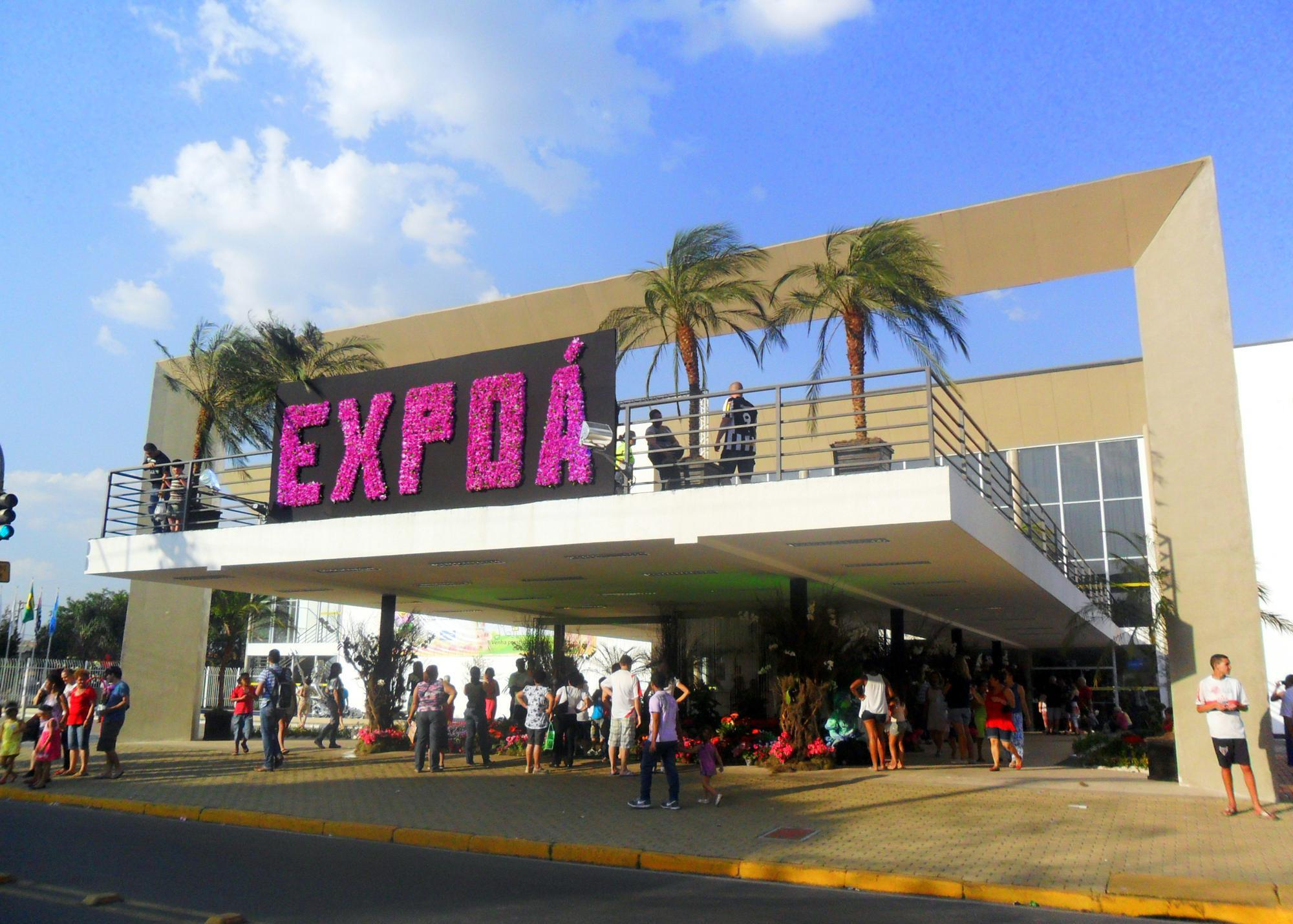
Main Square Event in one of the editions of the Expoá.

Because there are a lot of orchids existing in Poá and throughout the Upper Tietê, because of the favorable climate for the cultivation of the plant, in 1970 the Exhibition of Orchids and Ornamental Plants of Poá, better known as EXPOÁ, was established with the goal "to increase tourism in the city, as well as to provide a tribute to nature". The exhibition is recognized by the State Ministry of Sports and Tourism of the São Paulo State Government and since 1976 is part of the National Calendar of the Brazilian Institute of Tourism (formerly Embratur), linked to the Ministry of Tourism. It is held every year in September. From 1983 to 1993 the Expo was held at the Municipal Gymnasium Sports Americo Franco at Golden Village, and is currently held in the Event Square Lucilia Felippe Gomes, receiving approximately 300,000 visitors per year.

== Education, sport and culture ==
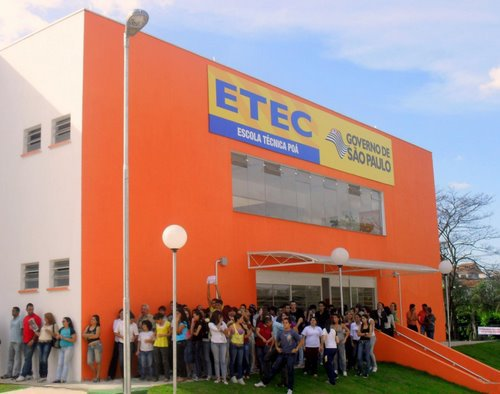
ETEC Technical School of Poá.

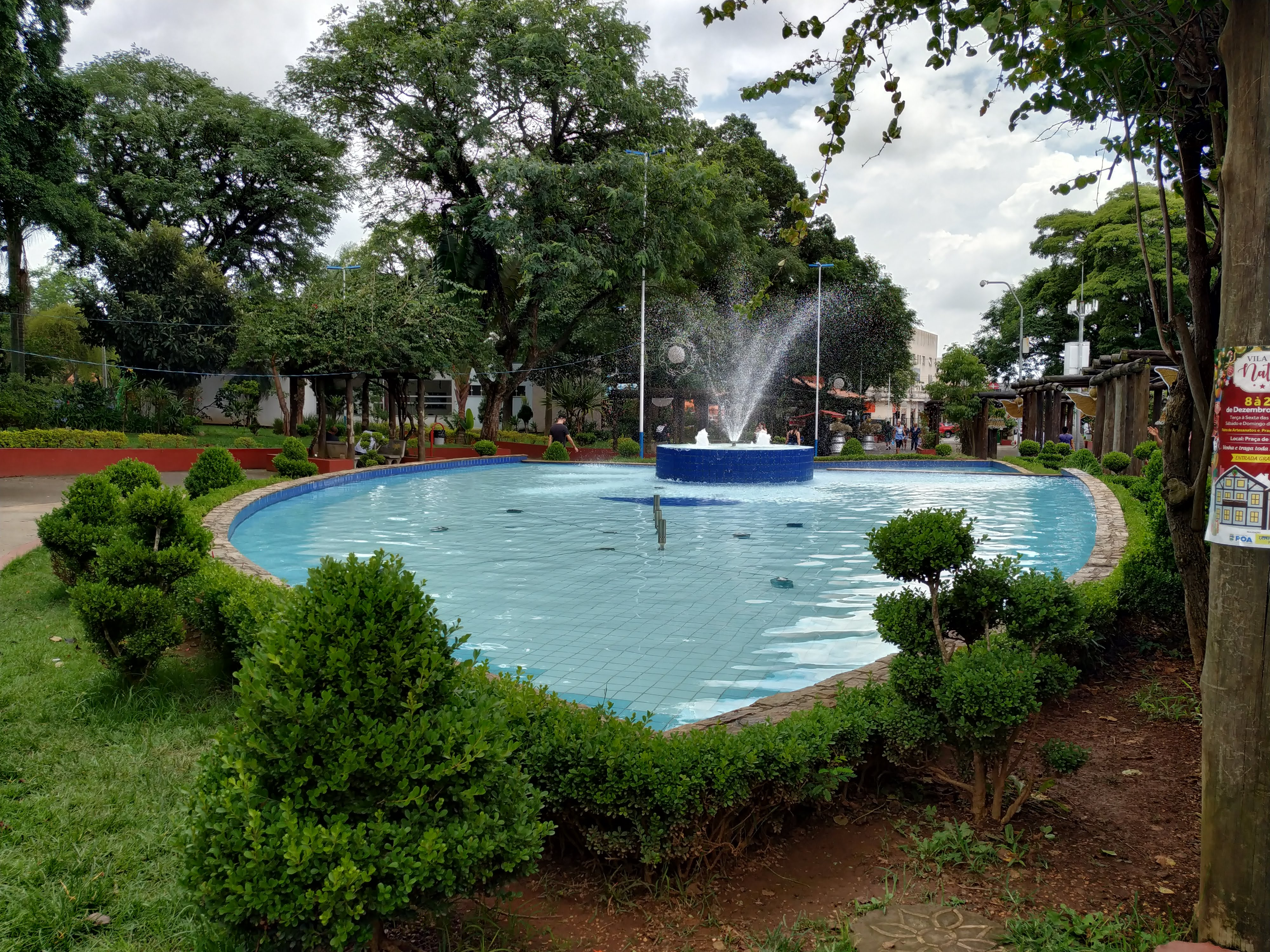
Bible Square

There are several schools located in the city, municipal, state, private and run by nongovernmental organizations. Among these is the unit of SESI, located in the Village Perracini the Napes - Center for Educational Support Specialist - which makes the inclusion of rooms in the normal classroom of students with various types of disabilities, located in Golden Village, which is ETEC and administered by the city of Poá - Poá State Technical College - which began its activities in the second half of 2009 and was inaugurated on 5 October that year. The deployment of ETEC was a partnership of municipal and state governments, where it invested R $1.5 million. They are offered technical courses and the school regularly. At the time of its inauguration, the building of ETEC Poá was considered by the Paula Souza Center, "one of the best network." The average candidate ETEC of Poá in 2009 was 6.1 applicants per vacancy.

In Poá, there are several locations available to the population, which were built from emancipation. The gym hall for example, located in Golden Village, started construction on January 25, 1957, by the state government. There are several sports associations legally registered in Poá. Three clubs, meanwhile, stands out for their ancient foundation and participation within the community: Esporte Clube XI Paulista, Poaense Athletic Association, Sports Club Concordia Poaense, and other associations like the Rotary Club and the Lyons Club offer free courses in rhythmic gymnastics, futsal, beach volleyball, capoeira, boxing, volleyball, basketball, judo, karate, and handball, among others, in their own municipal gymnasium and sports groups installed in neighborhoods such as those in towns and Julia Varela and St. Joseph's Garden.

Sports competitions are held sporadically in the various fields in the city, as in the neighborhoods Teresa Palma, Jardim América, Garden St. Helena, Juliet Villa, Villa Giulia, in the New Forest Poá, Vila Monteiro, Calmon Viana, together with companies neighborhood friends. Also occur capoeiristas meetings, the challenge of beach volleyball, indoor soccer battle, and streetball, among others. The skate park built in 2000, is installed next to the viaduct at the Centre, is open to the public and receives championships annually. Poá also has cultural spaces like the Public Library, Cultural Center and Municipal Museum Taiguara House Station. The squares within the existing neighborhoods and in the central region are also leisure facilities. The squares of the Bible and Events, for example, function as parks, as have recreational equipment such as playgrounds, restrooms and security. The Carnival is also a very traditional activity in the city, where there are parades of samba schools for over thirty years. Poá currently has ten active samba schools, among which we mention: the New Academic Poá, Empire Village Vampré, Clover Gold, Ultima Hora, Jau Village, and Villa Julia, among others.

== Economy ==
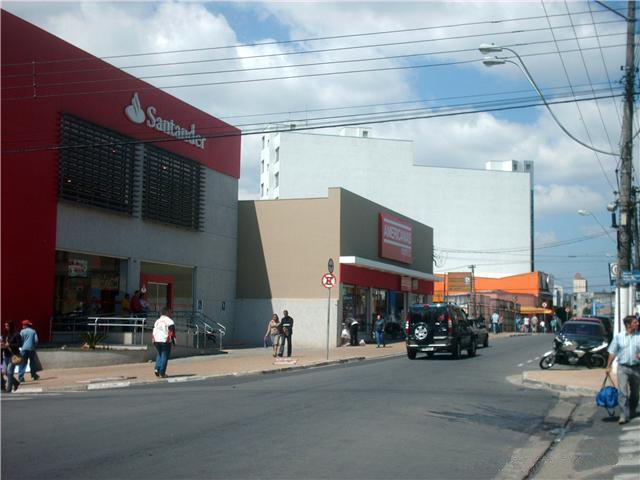
Nove de Julho Avenue

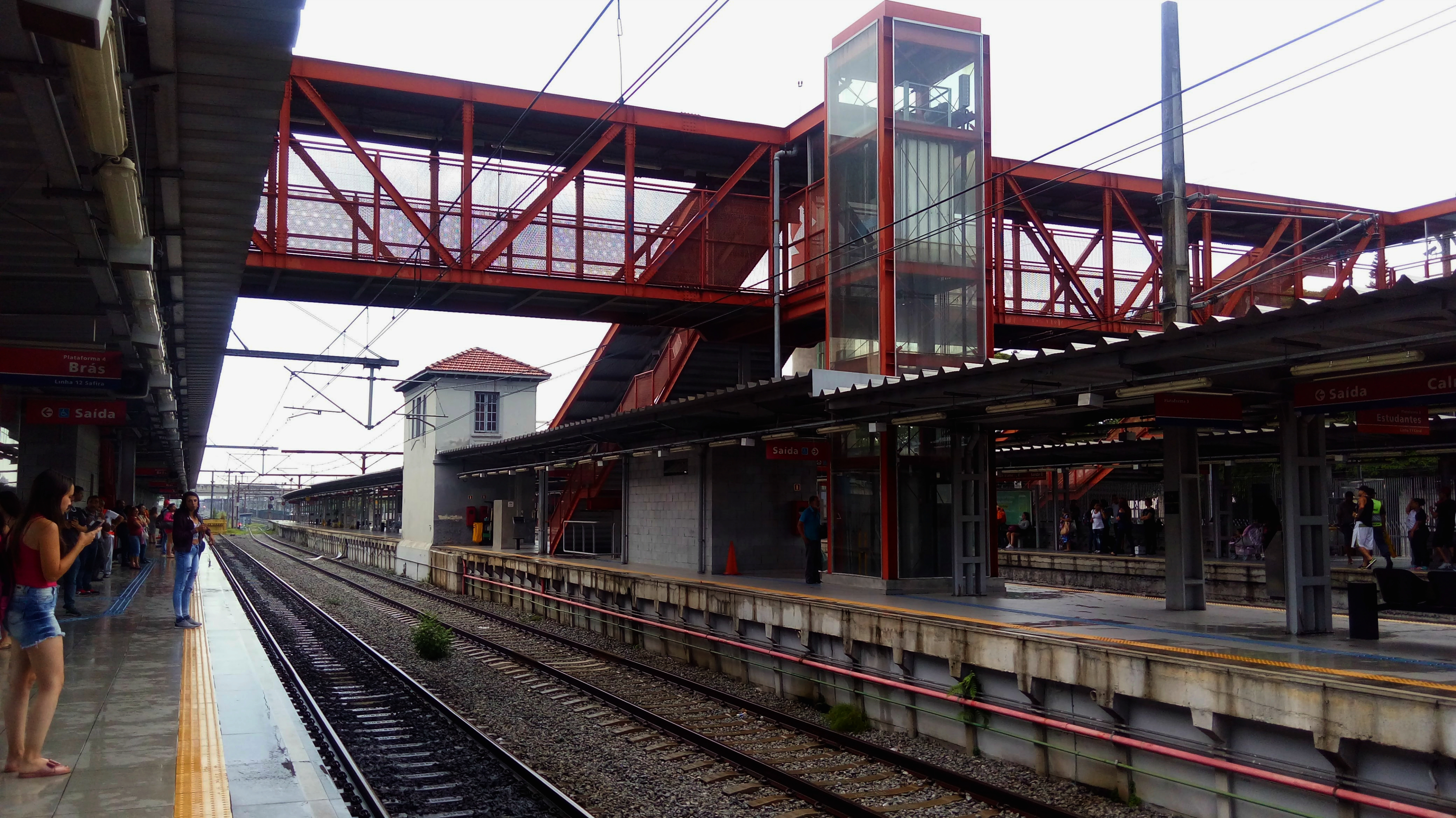
Calmon Viana Train station

In 2010, the Index of consumption potential of the inhabitants of Poá should consume R $1.4 billion. According to Target CPI, with a rate of 0.06408, Poá contributes six cents to every $100.00 spent in Brazil. This places the municipality in the 74th position in the state ranking. The city has 32,623 households and 31,813 cars caught on. Poaense each urban area in the city should consume R $12,459.76 in 2010.

Social stratification Data for 2010: Class Total Number of households consumed in the city The (per capita income above R $6,550.00 / month) 1441 households (4.5%) 18.9% B (per capita income between U.S. $2012.00 per month to R $6,549.00 / month) 11 313 households (35.1%) 49.1% C (per capita income between R $726.00 per month to R $2,011.00 / month) 14 853 households (46.1%) 27.5% D (per capita income between R $484.00 per month to R $276.00 / month) 4336 households (13.5%) 4.1% E (per capita income below R $276.00 / month) 230 households (0.7%) 0.4% 100% Total 32 623 households.

Sectors of the economy The economic sector of Poá has several activities: Industrial: After he received the title of office hidromineral, was prohibited the installation of polluting industries in the municipality, that in the 1970s, and those that existed have been given to move to a more rigid environmental legislation, to help preserve the groundwater in the city. The change resulted in the departure of some industries, but even so Poá houses large industries, among the nearly 200 installed on its territory. Highlights for the manufacturer of refractory Ibar (Brazilian Industry of Refractory items) which was installed in Poá five years before the emancipation of the municipality, the maker of electrical cables Inducabos, and the Brazilian subsidiary of the multinational Aunde, which produces automotive fabrics. Together, Ibar and Aunde occupy nearly half the area of Calmon Viana. The district that was formed between the two industries was renamed Vila Ibar.

Shopping: The main shopping streets of the city are street March 26 and July 9 Avenue that is in the center, housing most of the banks and "anchor stores" of the city. There are other commercial corridors such as Lucas Nogueira Garcez Avenue and Avenida Getulio Vargas, among others. It is estimated that there are approximately 2,000 commercial premises. Services: It is the sector of the economy that is more present in the city. There are various tax incentive laws and among them, and that attracts companies of its kind, is to reduce the tax on services (ISS), which has a much lower rate than in most towns. While its neighbor St. Paul (a city that focuses more on services company in Brazil), charge rate of 5% for most service activities, in Poá charge rate of 2%. are more than 20,000 service providers, among which we highlight the holding company of Banco Safra (Safra Leasing, located in the center) and Banco Itau (Itau Administradora Consortia and Itaucard Bank, both located in Vila das Acacias - also in the central region) and the subsidiary company of São Paulo TMKT telemarketing, (installed in Calmon Viana).

There is also horticultural activity in rural areas little is left of the city after the dispute of territory with Suzano in the 1950s and 1960s. Tourism began to be promoted now, in the early 2000s (decade). Yet the main event done in the city, the Expo comes to attract 350,000 people in seven days.

Composition of GDP
2006 data:
Sector of the economy GDP (US$)
Agriculture 545 000
Industry 392 085 000
Services 950 716 000
Taxes 602 681 000
Total 1,946,027,000

== Media ==
In telecommunications, the city was served by Companhia Telefônica da Borda do Campo. In July 1998, this company was acquired by Telefónica, which adopted the Vivo brand in 2012. The company is currently an operator of cell phones, fixed lines, internet (fiber optics/4G) and television (satellite and cable).

== See also ==
- List of municipalities in São Paulo
