= Ferraz de Vasconcelos =

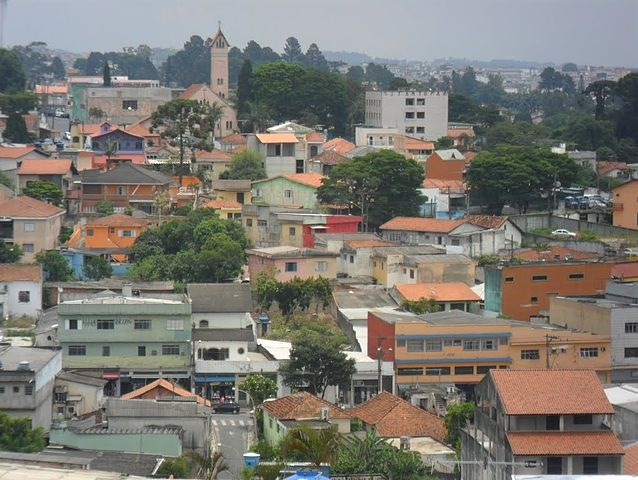
- Ferraz de Vasconcelos

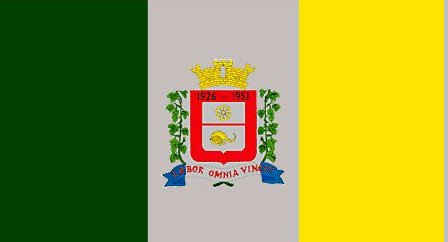
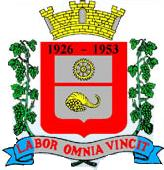
- Flag Coat of arms
- Nickname: Terra da Uva (Land Grape)
- Motto: Labor Omnia Vincit
- Location of Ferraz de Vasconcelos

- Location in Brazil
- Coordinates: 23°32′28″S 46°22′08″W
- Country: Brazil
- Region: Southeast
- State: São Paulo

Government
  - Mayor: Priscila Gambale

Area
  - Total: 29.56 km^{2} (11.41 sq mi)
- Elevation: 759 m (2,490 ft)

Population (2022 Brazilian Census)
  - Total: 179,198
  - Estimate (2025): 186,479
  - Density: 6,062/km^{2} (15,700/sq mi)
- Time zone: UTC−3 (BRT)
- HDI (2000): 0,772 – medium
- Website: Ferraz de Vasconcelos

Ferraz de Vasconcelos is a municipality in the state of São Paulo in Brazil. It is part of the Metropolitan Region of São Paulo. The population is 179,198 (2022 Census) in an area of 29.56 km^{2}.

== History ==
Ferraz de Vasconcelos is one of the cities of São Paulo founded by immigrants.

Ferraz de Vasconcelos was founded by two Italian immigrants, Helmuth Hans Hermann and Henry Louis Baxmann Kaesemodel.

Polo Italy Grape production in Brazil, the city is a pioneer in the cultivation of fruit. The first seedlings reach the hands of Italian immigrants who fixate on site. With the coming of Japanese agriculture becomes the main economic source. Today, the town hall and public buildings of the city are baptized Palace of Grape Italy.

== Geography ==
=== Location ===
Ferraz de Vasconcelos is situated in the eastern region of Greater São Paulo. Altitude: 759 meters above sea level. Limits are Poa and Suzano east, São Paulo west, Mauá southwest Ribeirão Pires and south Itaquaquecetuba north .

== Media ==
In telecommunications, the city was served by Companhia Telefônica da Borda do Campo. In July 1998, this company was acquired by Telefónica, which adopted the Vivo brand in 2012. The company is currently an operator of cell phones, fixed lines, internet (fiber optics/4G) and television (satellite and cable).

== Notable people ==
- Damiris Dantas, Brazilian basketball player
- Edmilson Carlos Abel, Brazilian footballer

== See also ==
- List of municipalities in São Paulo
