= Estudantes (CPTM) =

Railway station in São Paulo, Brazil

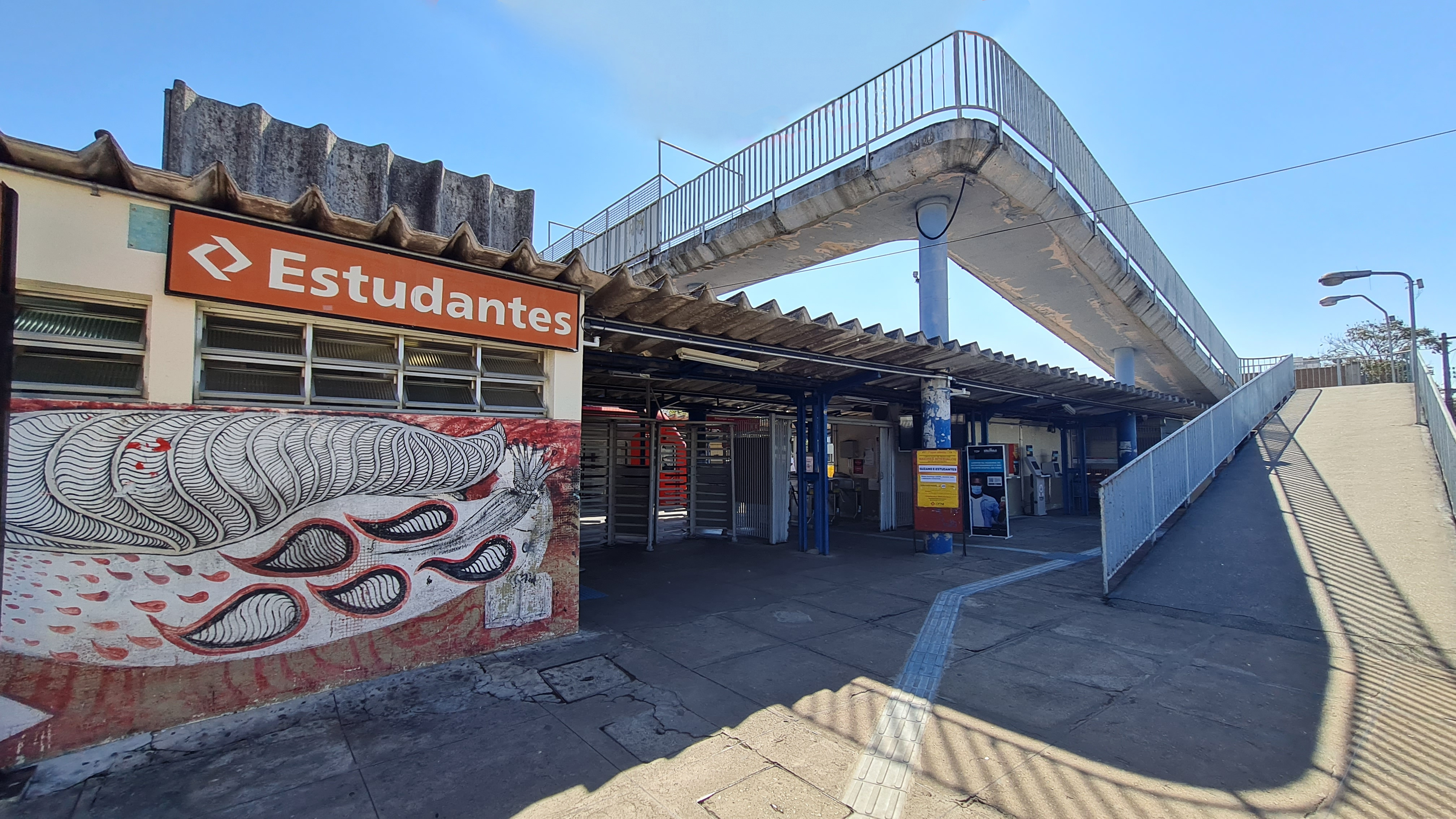
- Entrance of the station.

General information
- Location: R. Prof. Álvaro Pavan; Centro Cívico; Brazil
- Coordinates: 23.5155°S 46.184303°W
- Owner: Government of the State of São Paulo
- Operator: CPTM
- Platforms: Side and island platforms
- Connections: Estudantes Bus Terminal; Mogi das Cruzes Road Terminal

Construction
- Structure type: Surface

Other information
- Station code: EST

History
- Opened: 10 November 1976

Services
Preceding station	São Paulo Metropolitan Trains	Following station
Mogi das Cruzes towards Palmeiras-Barra Funda	Line 11	Terminus
Track layout
Location

Estudantes is a train station on CPTM Line 11-Coral, being the line terminus, located in the city of Mogi das Cruzes. It's in a privileged position, next to Braz Cubas and Mogi das Cruzes Universities, Mogi Shopping Mall, Estudantes Urban Bus Terminal, and Geraldo Scavone Bus Terminus, which are terminus for many bus lines.

== History ==
The creation of Braz Cubas University (1940) and Mogi das Cruzes University (1962) made an increase of students traffic from São Paulo, Suzano, Ferraz de Vasconcelos, among other cities, flow to the city of Mogi das Cruzes. Until then, the commuter train lines had Mogi das Cruzes as terminus station, obligating the students to take a bus to do the percourse of 2 kilometres (1.2 miles) remaining until these two campuses; With the demand growth, RFFSA created 2 special trains to attend to this demand: Alvorada and Estudantes. While the first was an express train with a different fee, the second attended exclusively the Mogi students demand. In one of these trips, on 8 June 1972, an electrical failure caused a collision between the students' train and a diesel express train. The accident caused the death of 23 people and wounded other 100. In the aftermath of the tragedy, Mogi residents claimed for an expansion of the commuter trains until the universities region.

In the end of 1975, RFFSA hired Civilia Ircos Constructions and Commerce Ltd. company to construction a new station, by the cost of 4,500,000 BRB. Construction started on 20 February 1976 and there was a promise to deliver it on mid-August. However, delays made the station to open only on 10 November 1976. On the same day, TUE Budd Mafersa-Series 1400 were delivered to the traffic.

In 1994, it was transferred to CPTM, which operated the station as an extension with scheduled departures at some hours of Variante Mogi Line, as the train needed to cross 4 level crossings in downtown Mogi, causing interruptions in the transit. In the mid-2000s, this operation was abolished and trains started to operate in full commercial time (4 a.m. to 12 a.m.).
