= Trivia Trens =

Brazilian rail transport company

Overview
- Main regions: São Paulo, Brazil
- Fleet: 64 CRRC Qingdao Sifang 2500 Series (8 trains); 288 CAF 8000 Series (36 trains); 280 CAF 8500 Series (35 trains); 72 Alstom 9000 Series (9 trains)
- Stations called at: 29
- Parent company: Grupo Comporte
- Key people: Claudio Andrade (CEO)
- Dates of operation: 2026–present
- Predecessor: Companhia Paulista de Trens Metropolitanos

Technical
- Track gauge: 1,600 mm (5 ft 3 in)
- Electrification: Overhead line, 3,000 V DC
- Operating speed: 80 km/h (50 mph)

Other
- Website: www.triviatrens.com.br

Trivia Trens is a company in Brazil belonging to Grupo Comporte, that has been responsible for the operation, maintenance and investments in lines 11-Coral, 12-Sapphire and 13-Jade through a public-private concession contract in partnership with the State Government of São Paulo.

== History ==
On 28 March 2025, Grupo Comporte won an international bidding for the concession of CPTM Lines 11, 12 and 13, named by the State Secretariat of Partnerships and Investments as "Lote Alto Tietê" (Allotment Higher Tietê). A ceremony was held on the headquarters of B3 in São Paulo, with the presence of governor Tarcísio de Freitas.

The concession will last for a period of 25 years, with projected investments of R$ 14.3 billion (US$ 2.5 billion in 2025) by Trivia, besides R$ 10 billion (US$ 1.78 billion) of contributions from the State Government of São Paulo for the construction of 10 new stations, renovation of the existing 24 stations and the removal of all level crossings, replacing with alternative access routes.

== Operation ==
Trivia Trens assumed officially the commuter lines in July 2026, after a year of transition from state-owned company CPTM, to ensure the safety and effectiveness of the system.

The rolling stock will be composed by 2500, 7000, 8000, 8500 and 9000 Series trains, acquired by CPTM, which will be transferred to the new operator during the concession period. A loan of 15 7000 Series trains will be made to Line 10-Turquoise in the proposed "Lote ABC-Guarulhos" plan (concession of Line 10 and construction of Line 14-Onyx), scheduled to be returned until 2031 and general overhaul made by CPTM.

Line 11-Coral will operate with 8000 and 8500 Series trains (predominantly 8000 Series), Line 12-Sapphire with 7000, 8500 and 9000 Series (predominantly 8500 Series) and Line 13-Jade only with 2500 Series trains.

== Lines ==
Line	Color	Termini	Length	Stations	Daily ridership (Apr 2019)
Line 11	Coral	Palmeiras-Barra Funda ↔ Estudantes	54.1 km (33.6 mi)	17	752,800
Line 12	Sapphire	Brás ↔ Calmon Viana	38.8 km (24.1 mi)	13	272,000
Line 13	Jade	Engenheiro Goulart ↔ Aeroporto-Guarulhos	12.2 km (7.6 mi)	3	13,300

=== Express services ===
Line	Color	Termini	Length	Stations
Line 13	Airport Express	Palmeiras-Barra Funda ↔ Aeroporto-Guarulhos	31.1 km (19.3 mi)	5

=== Future developments ===
Under Construction
Line	Color	Termini	Length	Stations
Line 11	Coral	Penha	—N/a	1

Planned
Line	Color	Termini	Length	Stations
Line 11	Coral (Expansion)	Estudantes ↔ César de Sousa	4.3 km (2.7 mi)	1
Line 11	Coral	Bom Retiro	—N/a	1
Line 11	Coral	Cerealista	—N/a	1
Line 11	Coral	Lajeado	—N/a	1
Line 12	Sapphire (Expansion)	Calmon Viana ↔ Suzano	2.6 km (1.6 mi)	1
Line 12	Sapphire	Gabriela Mistral	—N/a	1
Line 12	Sapphire	Cangaíba	—N/a	1
Line 12	Sapphire	União de Vila Nova	—N/a	1
Line 13	Jade (Expansion)	Aeroporto-Guarulhos ↔ Bonsucesso	10.5 km (6.5 mi)	4
Line 13	Jade (Expansion)	Engenheiro Goulart ↔ Gabriela Mistral	4.3 km (2.7 mi)	2

== See also ==
- TIC Trens
- Line 11 (CPTM)
- Line 12 (CPTM)
- Line 13 (CPTM)
