= CPTM Series 2000/2070 =

Class of EMU trains

Series 2000
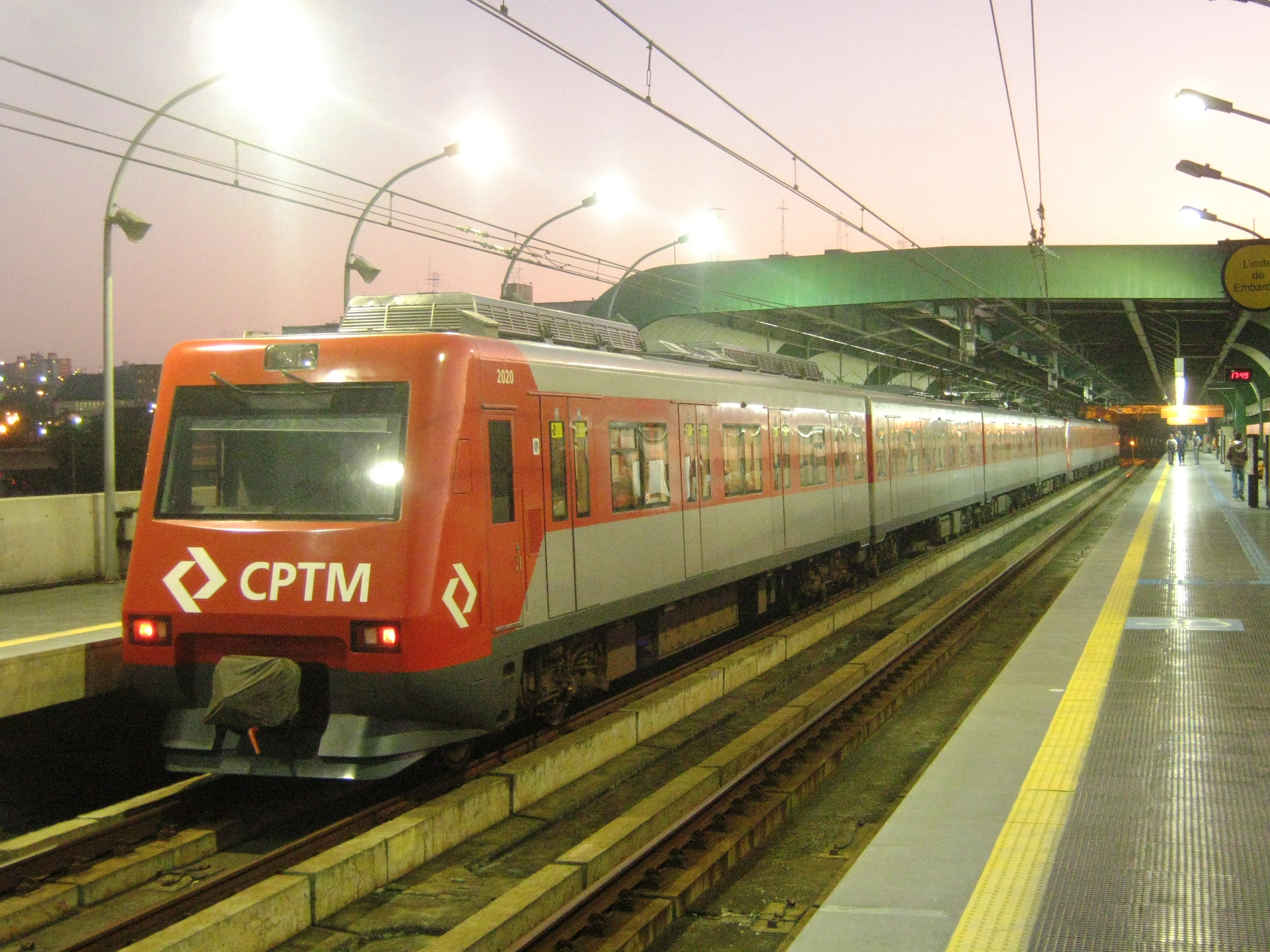
- A Series 2000 train on José Bonifácio station

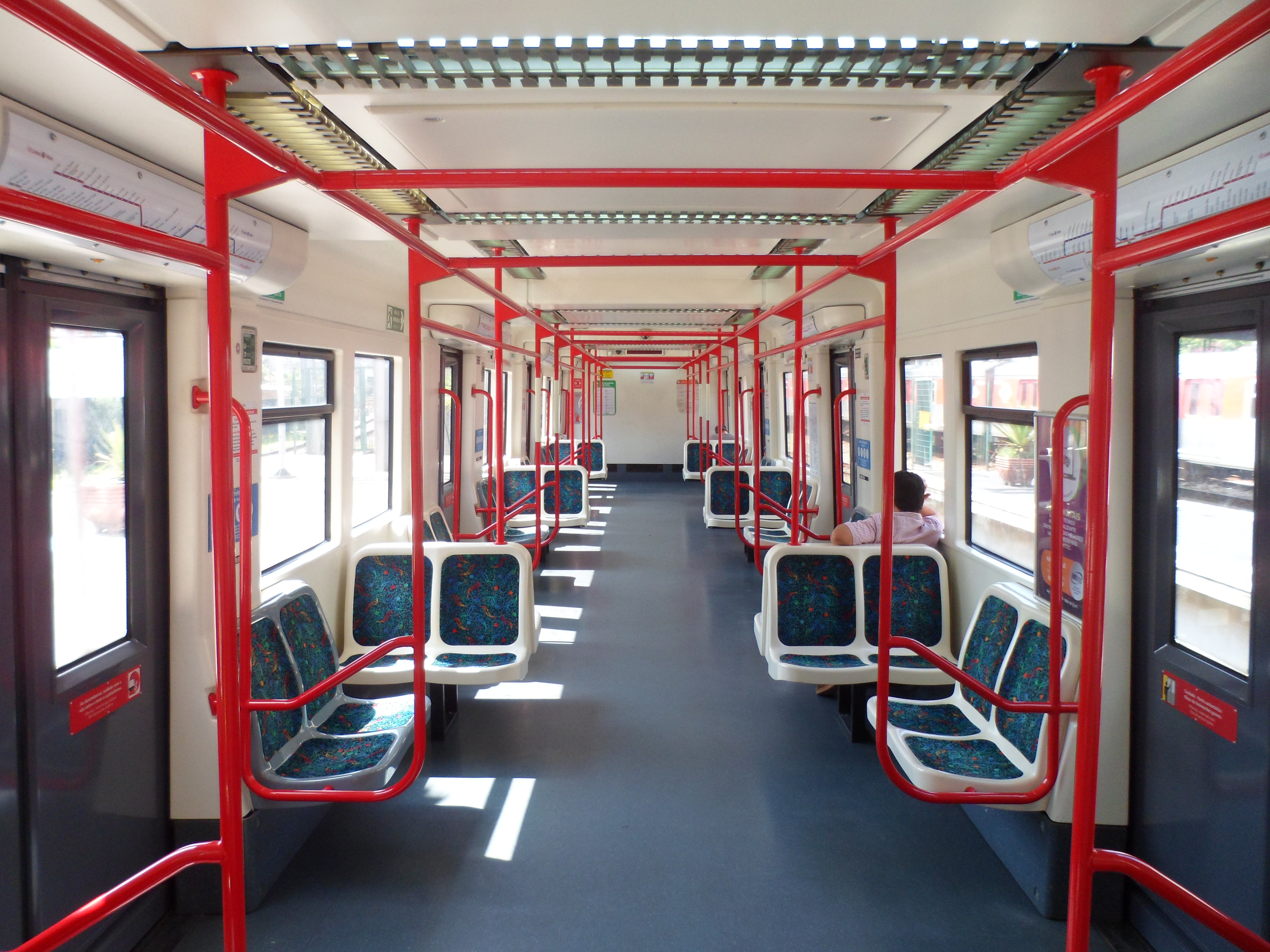
- In service: 2000–2024
- Manufacturer: CAF/Adtranz/Alstom
- Built at: Hortolândia, São Paulo
- Constructed: 1997–1999
- Entered service: 27 May 2000
- Refurbished: 2009–2015
- Scrapped: 2024
- Number built: 120 carriages (30 sets)
- Number in service: 0 carriages
- Successor: 8500 series
- Formation: 4-car sets (MC–R1–R2–MC)
- Fleet numbers: 2001/2002–2059/2060
- Capacity: 998 passengers
- Operator: CPTM
- Depots: Roosevelt Shelter; Engenheiro São Paulo Shelter
- Line served: Ex

Specifications
- Car body construction: Carbon steel
- Train length: 83,568 mm (274 ft 2.1 in)
- Car length: 21,174 mm (69 ft 5.6 in) (MC); 20.61 m (67 ft 7 in) (R)
- Width: 3.05 m (10 ft 0 in)
- Height: 4,389 mm (14 ft 4.8 in)
- Platform height: 1.1 m (3 ft 7 in)
- Entry: Step
- Doors: 8 sets of side doors per car
- Wheel diameter: 915 mm (36.0 in)
- Wheelbase: 2,250 mm (7 ft 5 in)
- Maximum speed: 90 km/h (56 mph)
- Traction system: Adtranz 3kV - 11RA GTO–VVVF
- Traction motors: 8 × Adtranz 6RIA4555 300 kW (400 hp) asynchronous 3-phase AC
- Power output: 2,400 kW (3,200 hp)
- Acceleration: 0.9 m/s^{2} (3.0 ft/s^{2})
- Deceleration: 0.77 m/s^{2} (2.5 ft/s^{2}) (service); 1.1 m/s^{2} (3.6 ft/s^{2}) (emergency)
- HVAC: Air conditioning
- Electric systems: 3 kV DC overhead line
- Current collection: Pantograph
- UIC classification: Bo′Bo′+2′2′+2′2′+Bo′Bo′
- Coupling system: Scharfenberg
- Track gauge: 1,600 mm (5 ft 3 in)

Notes/references
- Sourced from except where noted.

The CPTM Series 2000 was a class of electric multiple units part of the São Paulo Metropolitan Trains rolling stock.

== History ==
In 1987, the state government of São Paulo went against the opposition of the São Paulo Metropolitan Company and decided to expand the metro network on the east side of São Paulo. The project estimated the construction of 4 new stations between Itaquera and Guaianases. At the same time, the administration looked for a way to operate the CBTU East Line (Roosevelt–Mogi das Cruzes) in a consortium with the federal company. The measure aimed to divide the passenger demand on the East Side between the East Line and the new expansion of the Metro East-West Line. Later, CBTU backed off on the proposal.

Yet, in 1990, CBTU elaborated the minimum requirements for the acquisition of new trains for the East Line, base for a new express train service studied by the company at the time. In the following year, CBTU looked for financing with the World Bank. The acquisition proposal was approved by the World Bank in 1992, allowing a US$281 million financing.

With the process of transfer of the CBTU network from federal to state-level from 1993 to 1994, the newly created CPTM assumed the financing with the World Bank and launched an international bidding process, aiming the supply of 30 air conditioned electric multiple units. The bid was won by Consórcio Ferroviário Espanha-Brasil (Cofesbra), composed by Construcciones y Auxiliar de Ferrocarriles (CAF), Alstom and Adtranz. The contracted costed, as of 2 January 1995, R$ 245,447,871.20 (US$ 267,469,529.1).

The first trains were delivered in mid-1999 and all of the fleet was simultaneously on 27 May 2000, during the opening of the East Express.

=== Transfer to Line 12-Sapphire ===
From 7 August 2016, with the gradual delivery of the new Series 8500 on Line 11, the Spanish train was transferred to Line 12. The doors of Series 2000 follow a different pattern from other trains and they cause problem on their original line due to the excess of passengers. With the transfer to Line 12, besides being a low traffic line, Series 2000 replaced old Series 4400 EMU, which operated on Line 12 until 2018. The last of the Series 2000 was retired on 10 December 2024.

== CPTM Series 2070 ==
Series 2070
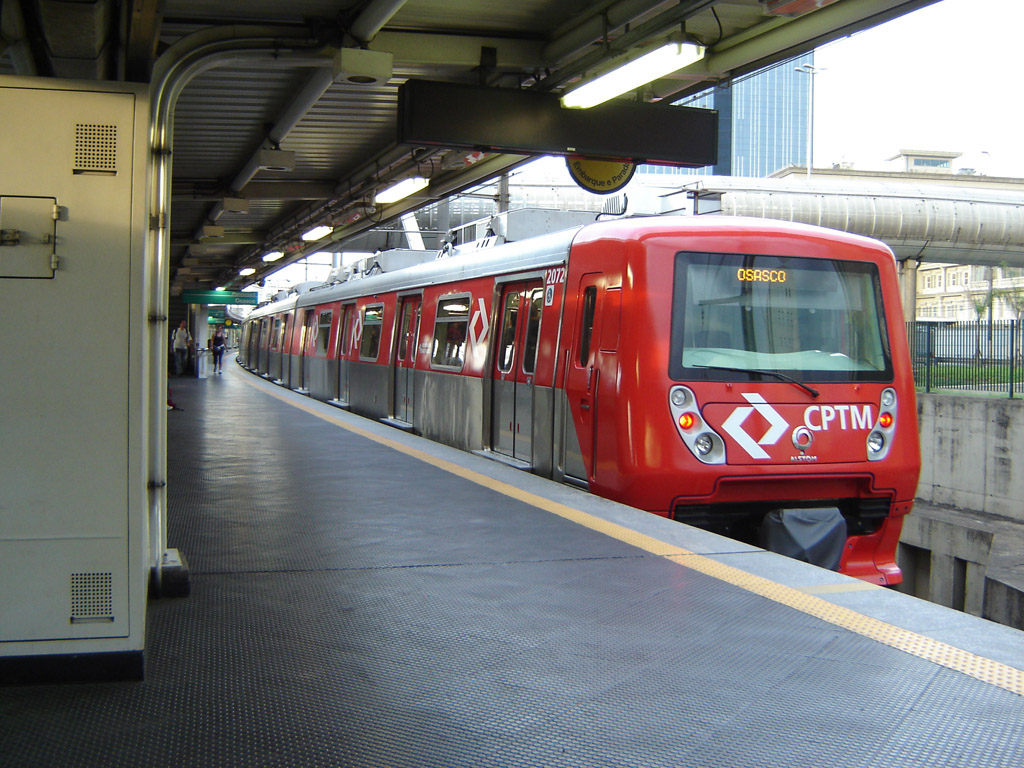
- A Series 2000 operating on Line 9-Emerald

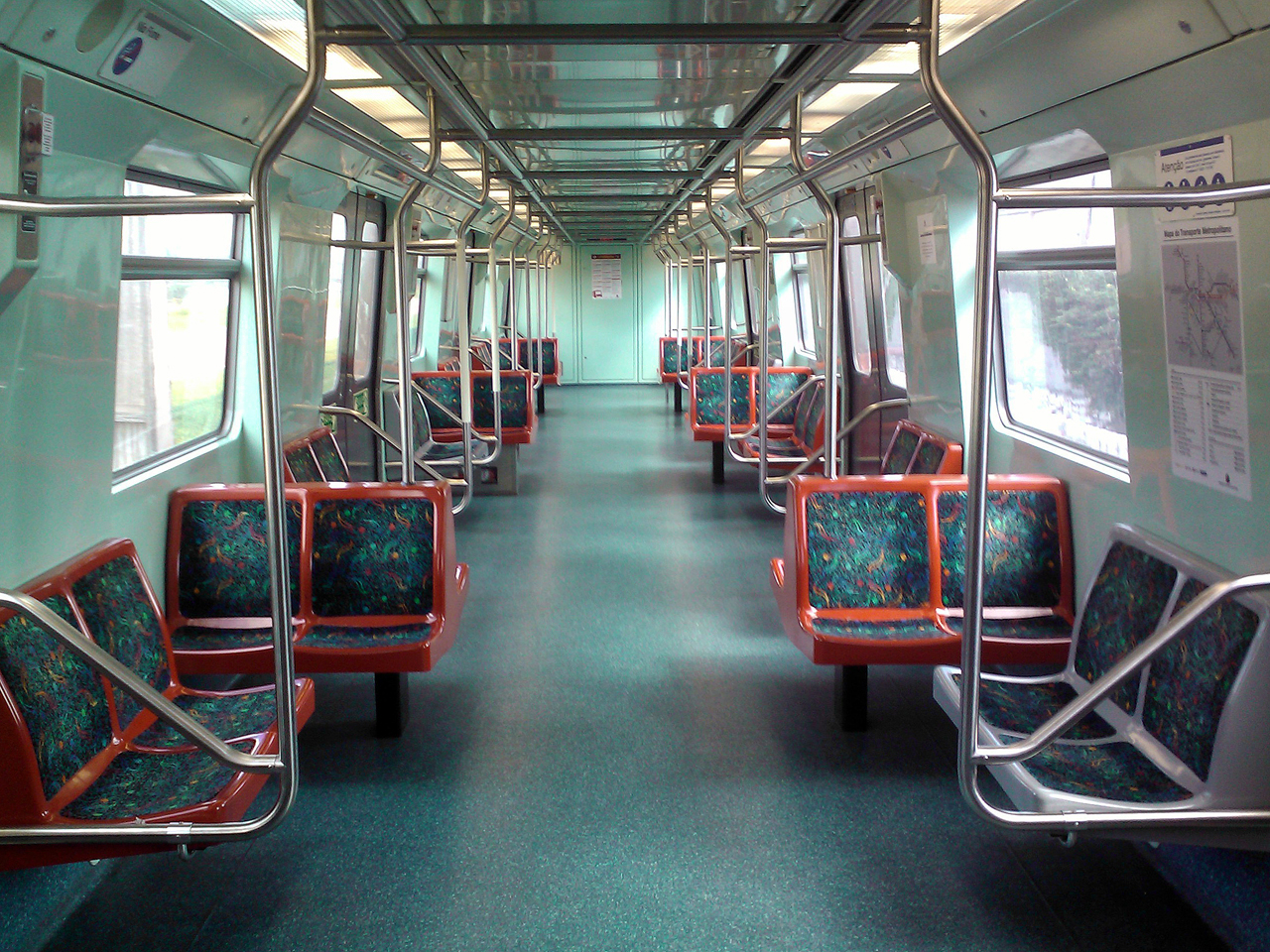
- In service: 2008–present
- Manufacturer: CAF/Bombardier/Alstom
- Built at: Lapa, São Paulo
- Constructed: 2008
- Entered service: 4 April 2008
- Number built: 48 carriages (12 sets)
- Number in service: 40 carriages (10 sets)
- Fleet numbers: 2071/2072–2093/2094
- Capacity: 962 passengers

Specifications
- Car body construction: Stainless steel
- Width: 3.04 m (10 ft 0 in)
- Height: 3.84 m (12 ft 7 in)
- Floor height: 1.33 m (4 ft 4 in)
- Maximum speed: 120 km/h (75 mph)
- Weight: 355,600 kg (784,000 lb)
- Traction system: Alstom ONIX 233 XHP IGBT–VVVF
- Deceleration: 1.1 m/s^{2} (3.6 ft/s^{2}) (service); 1.2 m/s^{2} (3.9 ft/s^{2}) (emergency)

Notes/references
- Same specs as 2000 series except where noted

=== History ===
During the acquisition of the Series 2000 for the East Express, a clause on the contract pointed and additive for the purchase of 12 new trains with 4 cars, predicting the success of the Express due to the government investment and the necessity to acquire more trains. However, the investment didn't come. Series 2000 had the contract signed in 1995, but the additional EMUs (Series 2070) only were delivered in 2008, 13 years later.

CPTM got involved in a controversy right before the delivery of these trains, which the operator had launched a new bid, won by French Alstom, which seemed weird, as half of the operating trains on East Express were from Spanish CAF, first winner of the bid. In the end, the trains were built by the French company in their factory in the district of Lapa, delivered in 2008 and initially operated on Line 9-Emerald, to complement the Series 2100 and Series 3000 EMUs that operated.

In 2010, the 12 units of 4 cars were turned into 6 units of 8 cars, due to the delivery of Series 7000 on Line 9, allowing more capacity in the train and possibility to share it with other lines, as is happened briefly on Line 8-Diamond, returning to Line 9 a little bit later.

=== Present day ===
The Series 2070, after their brief operation on Line 8 and return to Line 9, they were totally moved to Line 12-Sapphire, where they are still operating and share space with Series 2000, 8500 and 9000. Unit 2091–2092 is out of service since 2012 and unit 2093–2094 serves as a technical reserve in case a 2070 is transferred to maintenance.

== Accidents and incidents ==
- 23 February 2017 – Series 2070 train derails next to Itaim Paulista station. No one was harmed.
- 20 February 2020 – Small fire in a Series 2000 bogie. No one was harmed. The fire was caused by an overheat in the disk brake system.

== Irregular contract ==
The contract additive for the acquisition of the Series 2070 trains was considered irregular for the State Court of Accounts of São Paulo for not complying with the Biddings Law. The State Public Prosecutor's Office of São Paulo opened an investigation on the case. In 2022, a judge of the 7th Public Finances Circuit of the Court of Justice of São Paulo, Emílio Migliano Neto, pleaded guilty former CPTM chairman Mário Manuel Seabra Rodrigues Bandeira, former CAO and CFO Antonio Kanji Hoshikawa and former operation and maintenance director José Luiz Lavorente to a R$ 10 million (US$ 1,936,494.6) fine each. They can still appeal for this ruling.

== See also ==
- Line 12 (CPTM)
- Companhia Paulista de Trens Metropolitanos
- São Paulo Metropolitan Trains rolling stock
