= São Paulo Metropolitan Trains rolling stock =

The operational rolling stock of São Paulo Metropolitan Trains is composed different compositions of 12 different series, produced between 1956 and 2024, and it is the largest rolling stock of Brazil, split between Companhia Paulista de Trens Metropolitanos and ViaMobilidade. The company are passing by a deep stock modernization since 2007, which aims to withdraw the whole old trains. The modernization is being done also in the lines. Although, the biggest part of the modernization works is suffering delays since the initial prediction of completion was exceeded in 2012 and, because of that, the company has been withdrawing the old stock (trains prior to 1998) gradually. The trains are identified by serial numbers and they are with your visual communication being updated to the new red pattern in so far as they undergo into general review, which occurs after a certain mileage. Older trains already passed by several visual modifications, internal and external, besides small, medium and large reforms. All CPTM trains have a 1,600 mm (5 ft 3 in) broad track gauge and overhead catenary electric transmission of 3 kV DC. All lines operates with ATC system, however, Lines 7, 9 and 12 are being modernized to ATO, and Lines 8, 10, and 11 to CBTC. All operating compositions have the two new systems when the new signalling works.

== Current stock ==
- Series with links have an information page about them in Portuguese.
- All new EMUs undergo tests in all lines, but the Company keeps on exclusive tracks for various tests at Presidente Altino's courtyard and in Line 7.

Series	Image	Lines in operation	Previous lines	Build year	First owner	Manufacturer	Maximum speed	Trains/cars in operation	Notes
2070		Currently: Sapphire	Previous: Diamond; Emerald	2007/2008	CPTM	. Bombardier. Alstom. CAF	100 km/h (62 mph)	5/40	Unit 2091-2092 is immobilized by derailment and being "cannibalized" (reuse of parts) by CPTM's maintenance.
2500		Currently: Jade	Previous: ---	2019/2020	CPTM	. CRRC Qingdao Sifang	90 km/h (56 mph)	8/64	The compositions are equipped with luggage racks for passengers users of the airport.
3000		Currently: Out of service	Previous: Ruby; Diamond; Emerald; Turquoise ^{(with 8 cars)}	2000	CPTM	. Siemens. Mitsui. SGP	90 km/h (56 mph)	5/40	Started to operate in the new Express service in Line 10 in October 2016.; So far, no units has suffered accidents.; All of the compositions of this series are out of service.
5400		Currently: Out of service	Previous: Diamond^{(Op.Ext.)}	1978/1980	Fepasa	. Francorail. CCTU. MTE. Cobrasma	100 km/h (62 mph)	6/24	This series was born by the new formation and reform done in some of the withdrawn 5000 series, to operate in the reconstructed operational extension of Line 8, between Itapevi and Amador Bueno stations, since April 2014.
7000		Currently: Diamond (Note: Transferred to ViaMobilidade. From the 40 trains, 19 were returned to CPTM and 19 were permanently kept with ViaMobilidade, besides 2 out of service.) Emerald	Previous: Ruby; Turquoise; Coral; Sapphire	2009/2011	CPTM	. CAF	100 km/h (62 mph)	38/304	7005-7008 - Unit withdrawn after a serious accident.; 7069-7072 - Abandoned unit in CAF Hortolândia plant.
7500		Currently: Diamond (Note: Temporarily borrowed to ViaMobilidade.) Emerald	Previous: Ruby Turquoise	2010/2011	CPTM	. CAF	100 km/h (62 mph)	8/64	It has only one difference between the 7000 and 7500 series: the seating arrangement.
8000		Currently: Coral	Previous: Diamond; Emerald	2011/2012	CPTM	. CAF	90 km/h (56 mph)	34/272	Substituted the 5000 and 5500 series.; It was the first CPTM's train to have open gangway. By the way, this design is very similar to 7000 and 7500 series, but in addition to having an open gangway, the 8000 have larger doors and minor engine changes. The seating arrangement is equal to the 7500.; This series have a concession that permits them to operate only on Line 8.; Compositions S052 and S112 collided on March 2, 2017, in Barueri station. The two compositions will be probably withdrawn forever, because their structure was seriously affected. Nevertheless, there were only 5 injured people on the accident.
8500		Currently: Ruby; Emerald; Turquoise; Sapphire	Previous: Coral	2015/2017	CPTM	. CAF	90 km/h (56 mph)	11/88 (H508, H512, H516, H520, H532, H536, H540, H544, H564, H568, H576)	This stock is part of 65 ordered trains, which purchase was made in 2013.; 1st train (8513-8516) started operation on July 6, 2016, on Line 11.; it has the CBTC and ATO systems as standard.; With all trains delivered, it will be 35 compositions with 280 cars.; Being manufactured in Hortolândia, São Paulo, in CAF plant.; After less than a year of use, some compositions are suffering structural and braking issues. The problems are already being solved.
8900		Currently: Diamond Emerald	Previous: ---	2023/2024	ViaMobilidade	Alstom	90 km/h (56 mph)	1/8	One train operational, one train in tests and other 34 under construction.
9000		Currently: Sapphire	Previous: Coral; Jade	2011/2014	CPTM	Alstom	90 km/h (56 mph)	9/72	Started operations in Brazil's 2014 World Cup.; The first units were delivered in 2012. However, many problems were detected on the tests, and they came back to production line to solve them. The series was delivered again in 2014, before World Cup start.; It has open gangway.
9500		Currently: Ruby	Previous: Turquoise Jade	2017/2018	CPTM	. Hyundai Rotem	90 km/h (56 mph)	30/240	

== Diesel locomotive fleet ==
Below is the fleet of locomotives used in shunting, track maintenance, and the Touristic Express:

Model	Power output	Track gauge	Manufacturer	Country	Build year	Initial owner	Active fleet	Inactive fleet	Total	Notes
ALCO RS-3	1600 hp 1800 hp	1,600 mm (5 ft 3 in)	ALCO	United States	1952	EFCB	8	0	8	4 1600 hp units; 4 1800 hp units
Budd RDC	500 hp	1,600 mm (5 ft 3 in)	Budd	United States	1958	RFFSA	1	0	1	
GE U6B	640 hp	1,600 mm (5 ft 3 in)	GE	Brazil	1967	EFCB/EFSJ	1	0	1	
LEW DE-I-PA	960 hp	1,600 mm (5 ft 3 in)	LEW	East Germany	1967	CPEF	0	0	0	All inactive
LEW DE-II-S	960 hp	1,000 mm (3 ft 3 3/8 in)	LEW	East Germany	1967	EFS	0	0	0	All inactive
GE U20C	2000 hp	1,600 mm (5 ft 3 in)	GE	Brazil	1980	RFFSA	2	0	2	
PR22L	2200 hp	1,600 mm (5 ft 3 in)	Progress Rail	Brazil	2021	CPTM	2	0	2	
EMD G8	900 hp	1,600 mm (5 ft 3 in)	GM/EMD	United States	1960 (Note: The exact date is not available.)	RFFSA	1	0	1	ViaMobilidade fleet
EMD G12	1425 hp	1,600 mm (5 ft 3 in)	GM/EMD	United States	1960	RFFSA	1	0	1	ViaMobilidade fleet
TOTAL							16	0	16	

Of these, two were acquired by ViaMobilidade for its maintenance activities, coming from the Ferrovia Tereza Cristina.

== Retired stock ==
Series	Image	Last line in operation	Previous lines	Fabrication year	Last year in operation	Manufacturer	First owner	Maximum velocity	Trains/cars	Notes
1100		Ruby	Turquoise	1956/1957	2018	EFSJ	. Budd Company. Mafersa	100 km/h (62 mph)	9/54 (J102, J108, J112, J116, J117, J118, J121, J122, J123)	1108 and 1118 - Units operating exclusively in operational extension.; 1103 - Inactive unit, due to total loss in a serious accident in Perus station, in 2000, with the 1700 Series unit 1740. The 3 remaining cars, 1318-1218-1118, were coupled into reserve unit 1115, normally operating now.; 1105-1106 - Units withdrawn in 2015.; 1104-1109 - Units withdrawn in 2016.
1400		Sapphire	Ruby Turquoise Coral	1976/1977	2017	RFFSA	. Budd Company. Mafersa	100 km/h (62 mph)	2/12 (E402, E412)	1401-1402 and 1409-1412 - Are the last 2 compositions operating.; 1403- 1404 - Last train in operation in Line 7. Withdrawn in October 2016.
1600		Ruby^{(with four cars)}	Turquoise Coral Sapphire	1978	2017	. Budd Company. Mafersa	RFFSA	100 km/h (62 mph)	40/120	1601-1612 and 1602-1613 - Last units in operation in Line 7 and modified with four cars, in metropolitan and red pattern, were withdrawn in January 2017 after frequent breakdowns. The withdraw is still not confirmed by CPTM, but they are unlikely to return to operation.; Originally, each composition were made by 6 cars, divided in 2 EMUs.
1700		Ruby ^{(with four cars)}	Turquoise	1987	2019	CBTU	. Mafersa. Hitachi	120 km/h (75 mph)	12/80 (G712, G722, G732, G736, G740, G744, G748, G750, GX718, GX728, GX730, GX742)	1741-1742 - Only unit with CPTM's original pattern.; 1707-1708; 1719-1720 and 1723-1724 - Units with original pattern, but inactive.; 1717-1718; 1727-1728; 1729-1730 and 1741-1742 - Operates only in Line 7's operational extension between Francisco Morato and Jundiaí stations.
2000		Currently: Sapphire	Previous: Coral	1997/1999	2024	CPTM	. CAF. ADTranz. Alstom	90 km/h (56 mph)	15/120	Started operation in Line 12 in August 2016, and all these series were gradually transferred to it. In March 2024 it was announced they retired; First CPTM's series with air conditioning system and VVVF engines.
2100		Currently: Out Of Operation Turquoise	Previous: Coral Emerald	1974/1977	2024	Renfe	. CAF	140 km/h (87 mph)	24/144	Originally projected to be medium distance regional EMUs, were adapted, modernized and bought of Renfe in 1998 for CPTM's metropolitan operation.
4400		Coral	Coral	1965	2018	EFCB	. Cobrasma. FNV	100 km/h (62 mph)	12/72	4430-4431; 4408-4425 and 4409-4410 - Units withdrawn in 2015.; 4403-4420 - Unit withdrawn in 2017.
4800		Diamond^{(Ext.Op.)}	Emerald	1957/1958	2010	. Toshiba. Kawasaki. Nippon	EFS	?	?	All units were withdrawn in April 2010, but they are still part of CPTM's patrimony. Actually the remaining units are parked at Presidente Altino yard (4802 and 4807 with red pattern, e 4808, on graffiti).; 3 units were donated to CTB, in Salvador city, capital of the Brazilian state of Bahia. Of 3 units, one is already withdrawn.
5000		Diamond	Emerald^{(with six cars)}	1978	2012	. Francorail. CCTU. MTE. Cobrasma	Fepasa	100 km/h (62 mph)	48/288	Withdrawn in 2012, but they are still part of CPTM's patrimony.; One unit is in the original pattern of Fepasa in Presidente Altino yard. It suffered an accident in the 1980s and then was retired definitely.; It was the longest suburban train in the world, with 12 cars and 250 m (820 ft), and was even registered in the Guinness Book. Until today the title is of the TUE.
5500	In right side. Train on left is a 1600 series	Diamond^{(With 12 cars)} Coral^{(With 8 cars)} Sapphire ^{(With 8 cars)}	---	1978/1979	2012	. Sorefame. ACEC	Fepasa	100 km/h (62 mph)	16/108	Withdrawn in 2012, but they are still part of CPTM's patrimony.; It had one unit in CPTM's red pattern and another were being painted, but they were withdrawn before delivery.; One reason of your retirement was the extremely high energy consumption. Therefore, they were nicknamed "eletrocarros" ("Electricars").
5550		Sapphire	---	2007/2008	2016	. Bombardier. Tejofran . ACEC	CPTM	100 km/h (62 mph)	8/32	Rebuilt from 5500 series cars.; The only train fleet that has been completely extinct, that is, there isn't even a single railcar remaining.
