= CPTM Series 7000 =

Class of EMU trains

Series 7000
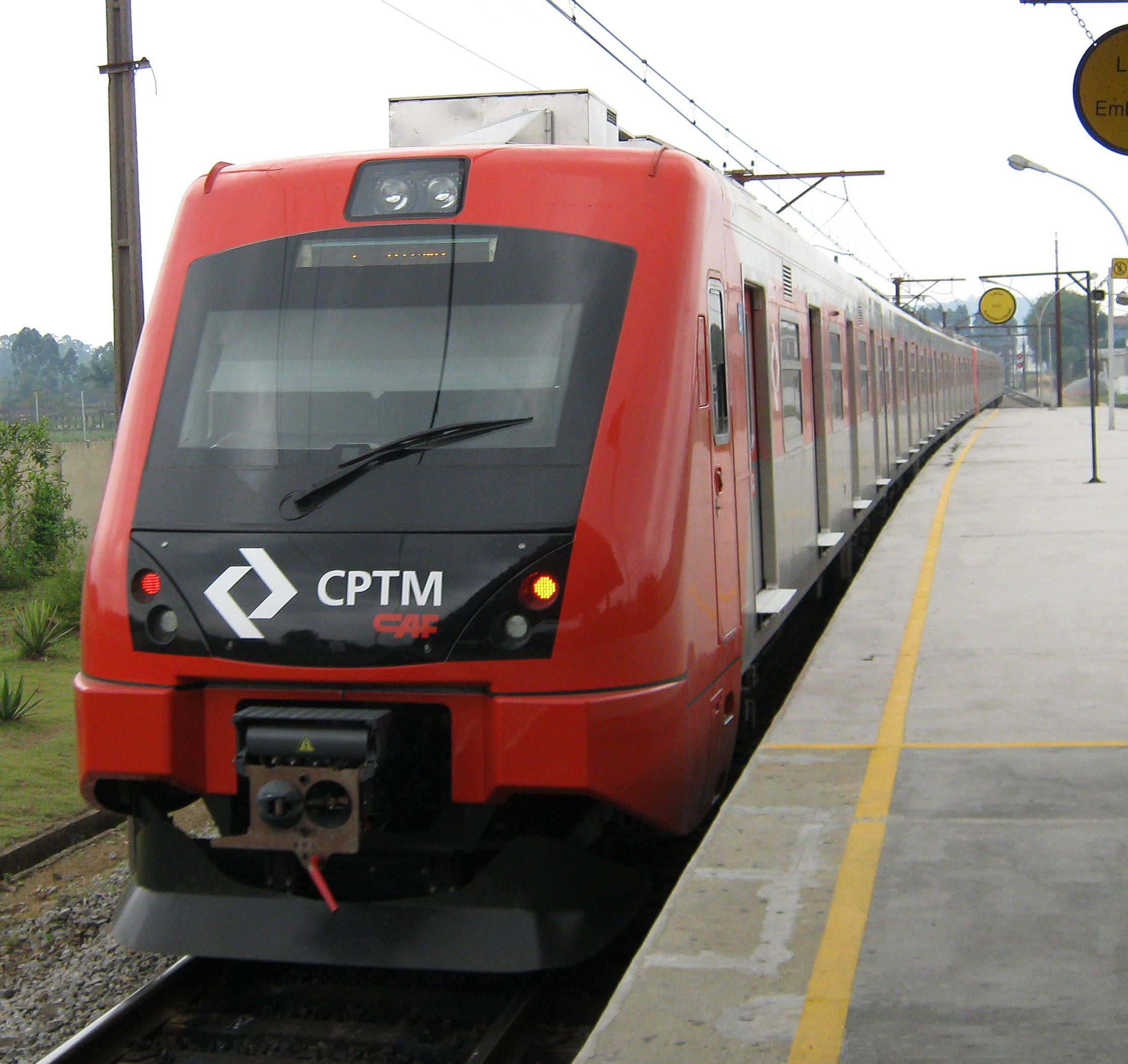

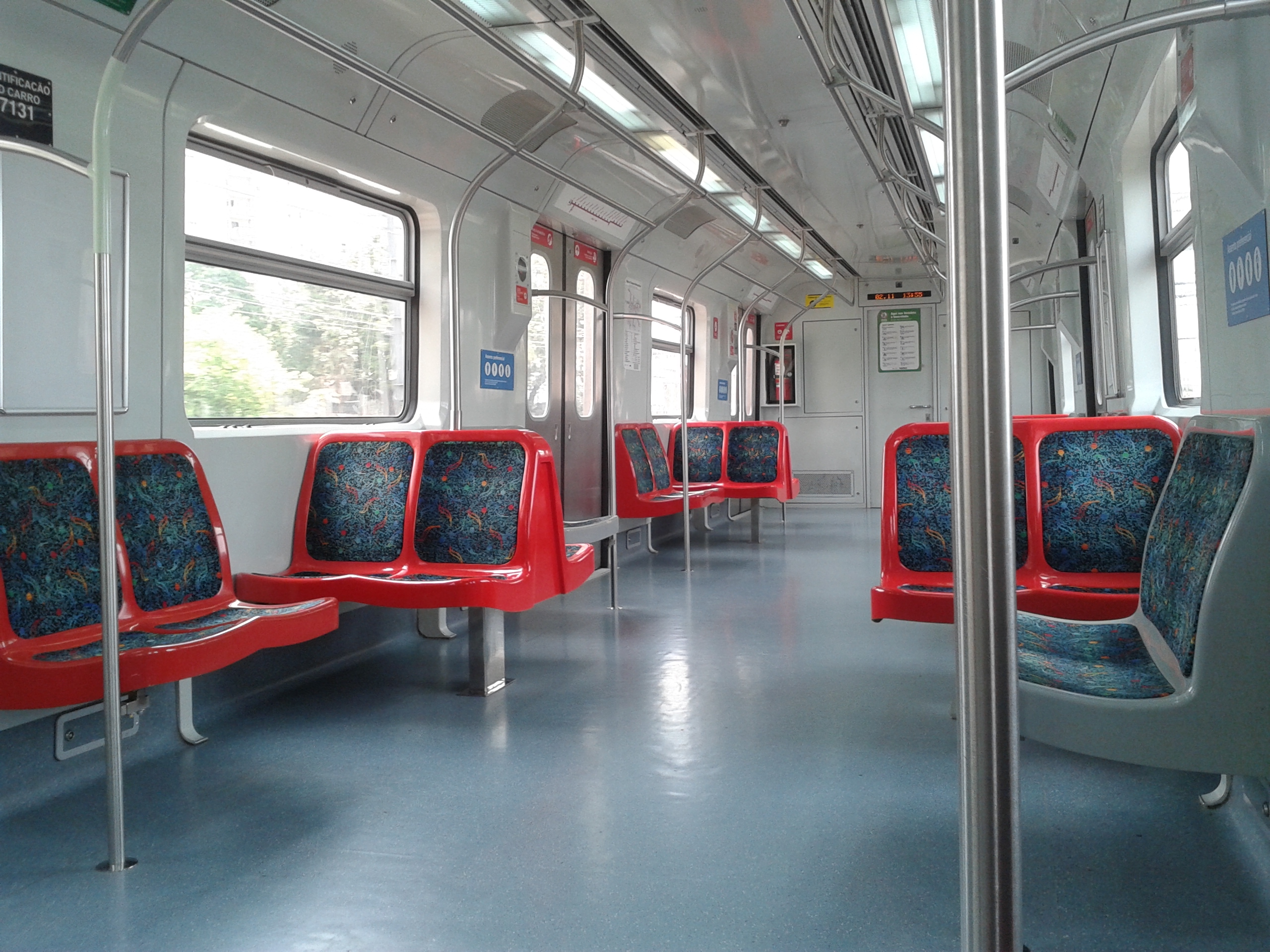
- In service: 2010–present
- Manufacturer: CAF
- Built at: Hortolândia, São Paulo
- Constructed: 2009–2011
- Entered service: 28 March 2010
- Number built: 320 carriages (80 sets)
- Number in service: 304 carriages (76 sets)
- Number scrapped: 16 carriages (4 sets)
- Formation: 4-car sets (MC–R1–R2–MC)
- Fleet numbers: 7001/7002–7159/7160
- Capacity: 1,004 per EMU
- Operators: CPTM; ViaMobilidade
- Depot: Presidente Altino Yard

Specifications
- Car body construction: Stainless steel
- Car length: 21.92 m (71 ft 11 in) (MC); 20.61 m (67 ft 7 in) (R)
- Width: 3.05 m (10 ft 0 in)
- Height: 3.93 m (12 ft 11 in)
- Floor height: 1.33 m (4 ft 4 in)
- Platform height: 1.1 m (3 ft 7 in)
- Entry: Step
- Doors: 8 sets of side doors per car
- Wheel diameter: 915 mm (36.0 in)
- Wheelbase: 2,500 mm (8 ft 2 in)
- Maximum speed: 100 km/h (62 mph)
- Weight: 179,000 kg (395,000 lb)
- Traction system: Mitsubishi Electric MAP-264-30VD210 IGBT–VVVF
- Traction motors: 8 × Mitsubishi MB-5136-A 260 kW (350 hp) asynchronous 3-phase AC
- Power output: 2,080 kW (2,790 hp)
- Acceleration: 0.9 m/s^{2} (3.0 ft/s^{2})
- Deceleration: 1.1 m/s^{2} (3.6 ft/s^{2}) (service); 1.2 m/s^{2} (3.9 ft/s^{2}) (emergency)
- Auxiliaries: SEPSA IGBT Auxiliary Power Supply Box (209 kVA)
- HVAC: Air conditioning
- Electric systems: 3 kV DC overhead line
- Current collection: Pantograph
- UIC classification: Bo′Bo′+2′2′+2′2′+Bo′Bo′
- Braking systems: Electric regenerative, two disc brakes per axle
- Coupling system: Scharfenberg
- Track gauge: 1,600 mm (5 ft 3 in)

Notes/references
- Sourced from except where noted.

The CPTM Series 7000 is a class of electric multiple units part of the São Paulo Metropolitan Trains rolling stock. It was built by CAF and began operating in 2010.

== History ==
=== Project and manufacturing ===
In 2008, the state government launched a modernization program for CPTM trains, taking a US$1.74 billion loan with the International Bank for Reconstruction and Development and the Japan Bank for International Cooperation. With these resources, CPTM launched an international bid, aiming the acquisition of 40 trains with 8 cars each. Companies CAF, Siemens and Alstom presented the following proposals:

- CAF – R$1.1 billion (US$599.8 million)
- Alstom – N/A
- Siemens – R$1.9 billion (US$1.036 billion)

After analyzing the proposals, CAF was declared the winner on 3 July 2008. As consequence, Siemens appealed to the Court of Justice, claiming for irregularities. The contract signing got suspended until final decision of the Superior Court of Justice, which allowed the signing, at the cost of R$1,177,188,281.67 (US$ 641,950,965.23). Besides it, Siemens' allegations led to investigations which resulted in the bidding scandal of São Paulo public transit.

Due to a legal demand of the state government, CAF had implemented a train factory in Hortolândia. This factory was responsible for 38 out of 40 trains, while the first two units were assembled in a factory in Zaragoza, Spain.

=== Operation ===
The first train was delivered on 28 March 2010, operating on Line 12-Sapphire.

With the concession of lines 8-Diamond and 9-Emerald in 2021, all of the operational units of this fleet were temporarily transferred to these lines, as the least used trains will be returned to CPTM after the delivery of Series 8900, acquired by the private operator. The remaining Series 7000 units will permanently be kept on these lines.

== CPTM Series 7500 ==
Series 7500
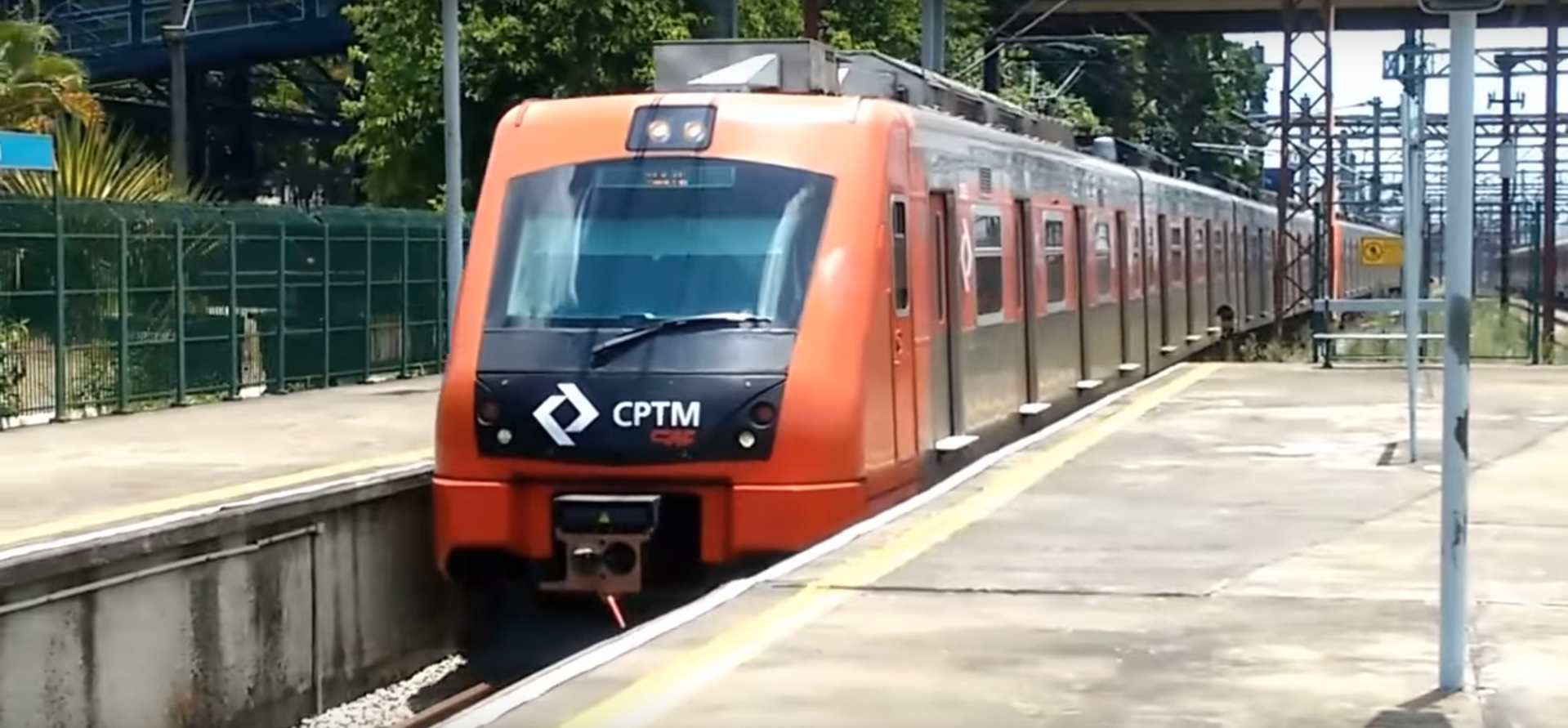

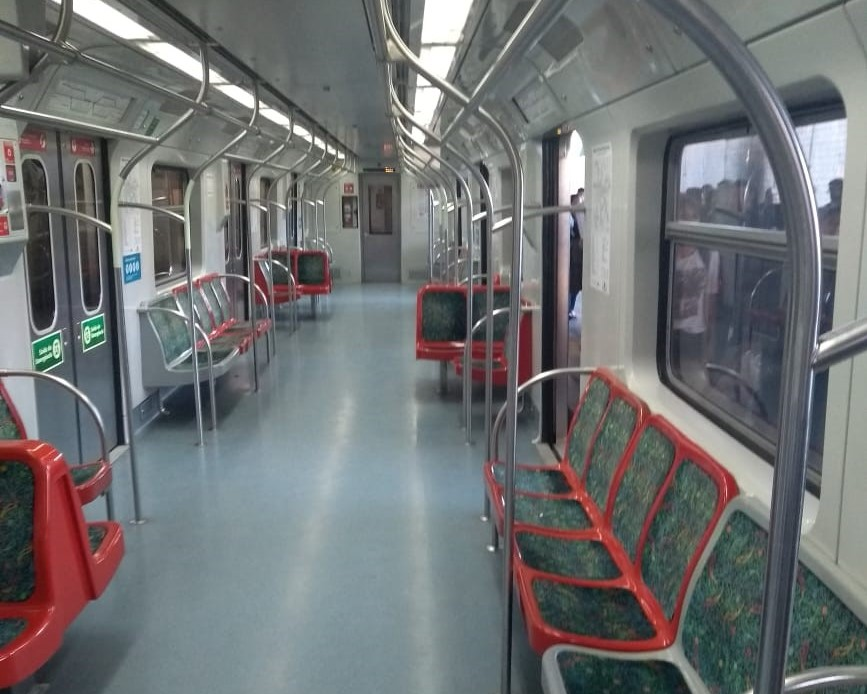
- In service: 2011–present
- Manufacturer: CAF
- Constructed: 2010–2011
- Entered service: 26 August 2011
- Number built: 64 carriages (16 sets)
- Number in service: 64 carriages (16 sets)
- Fleet numbers: 7501/7502–7531/7532

Notes/references
- Same specs as 7000 series except where noted

The CPTM Series 7500 is a class of electric multiple units part of the São Paulo Metropolitan Trains rolling stock. After the acquisition of the Series 7000 trains, CPTM launched a bidding in March 2008 to buy 8 new trains. The bidding was won again by CAF, at the cost of R$272,265,004.27 (US$ 148,473,090.51).

The new trains, named Series 7500, began operating in August 2011, at that time only on Line 9-Emerald. The delivery of 7 trains in 2011 made the Mean Kilometer Between Failure (MKBF) index increase in this fleet. With the delivery of Series 8500 and Series 9500 for lines 7-Ruby and 11-Coral, these units were transferred to Line 10-Turquoise, which was lacking of new trains, operating only with Series 2100 ("Spanish Train") and, later, with Series 3000, on express services. The first composition (7517–7520) began operating on Line 10-Turquoise in February 2018 and on Line 7-Ruby in May 2021. In November 2021, the fleet returned to Line 9-Emerald and, in December 2021, on Line 8-Diamonds, temporarily borrowed to the lines' new operator. On 12 December 2021, the last train operating on Service 710 ceased operations and, on 13 December, the fleet was fully transferred to lines 8-Diamond and 9-Emerald. All of the Series 7500 trains will be returned to CPTM as the new trains acquired by ViaMobilidade are delivered.

== Accidents and incidents ==
- 23 December 2010 – Collision in slow speed between two empty Series 7000 and Series 1100 on a track switch on Luz station. No one was harmed.
- 11 July 2011 – Collision between two Series 7000 and Series 1700 trains on Barra Funda station let 42 people injured. Later on, a report indicated human fault, resulting in the firing of the train driver.
- 16 February 2012 – An empty train derails on a track switch near to Ceasa station.
- 15 June 2019 – Train collides with a bumper on Brás station. No one was harmed.
- 10 March 2022 – Series 7000 train collided with a bumper on Júlio Prestes station, destroying the barrier, but no one was harmed.
- 21 August 2022 – Series 7500 derails with passengers between Domingos de Moraes and Imperatriz Leopoldina station, on Line 8-Diamond.
- 7 December 2022 – Series 7000 train derails with passengers on a platform of Domingos de Moraes station, on Line 8-Diamond.
- 16 January 2023 – Series 7000 train derails with passengers next to Lapa, on Line 8-Diamond.
- 28 February 2023 – Series 7000 train derails with passengers between Grajaú and Mendes–Vila Natal stations, on Line 9-Emerald.
- 18 March 2023 – Series 7000 train derails with passengers between Itapevi and Sagrado Coração stations, on Line 8-Diamond.
- 30 March 2023 – Series 7000 train derails with passengers next to Júlio Prestes station, on Line 8-Diamond.

== Controversies ==
According to the State Court of Accounts of São Paulo, the acquisition of these 48 trains between 2007 and 2008 was made with old estimated prices (dated from 1994), resulting in possible financial loss to the state.

== See also ==
- Line 8 (CPTM)
- Line 9 (CPTM)
- Companhia Paulista de Trens Metropolitanos
- ViaMobilidade
- São Paulo Metropolitan Trains rolling stock
