= CPTM Series 9500 =

Class of electric multiple units

Series 9500
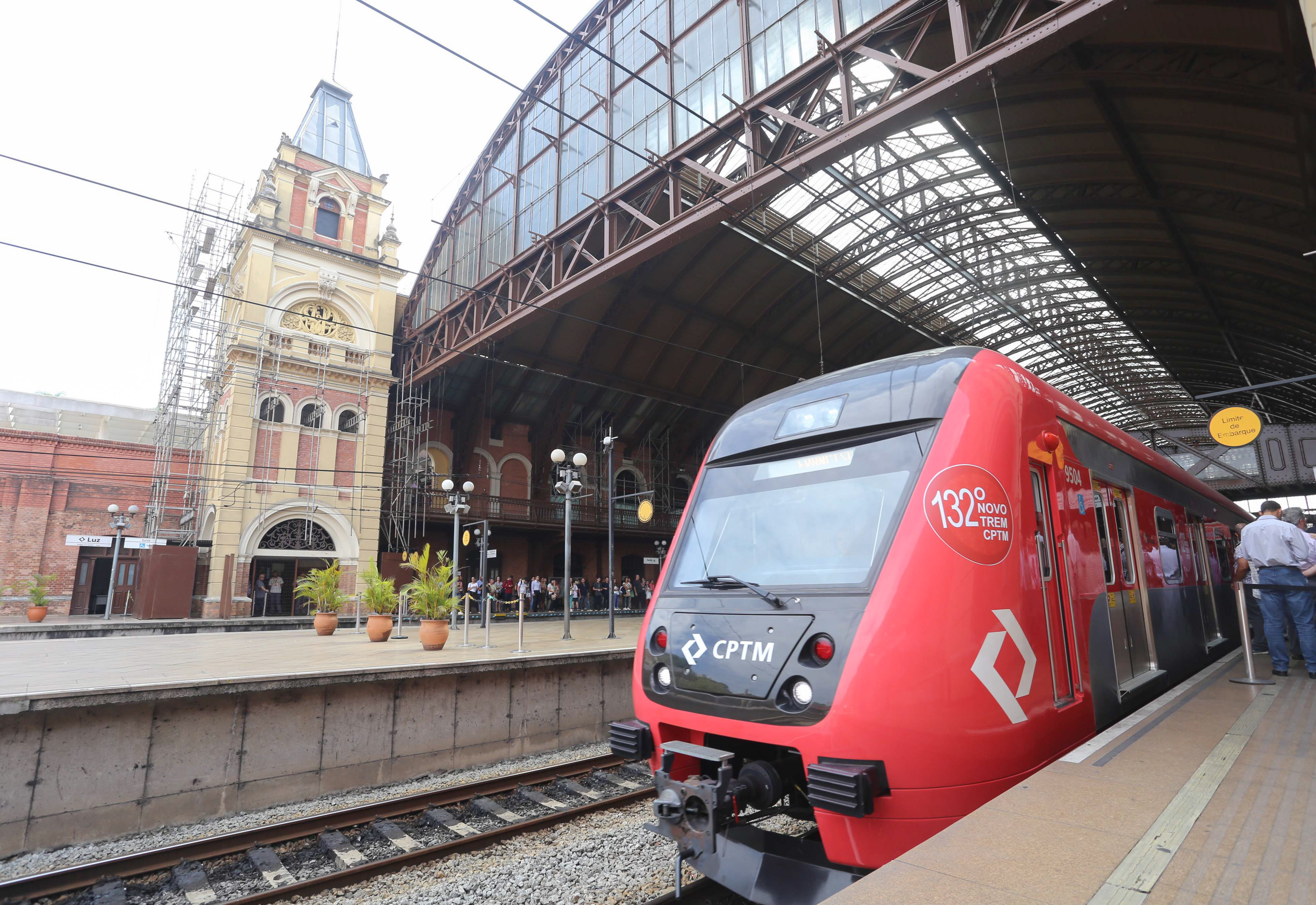
- A Series 9504 train on Luz station

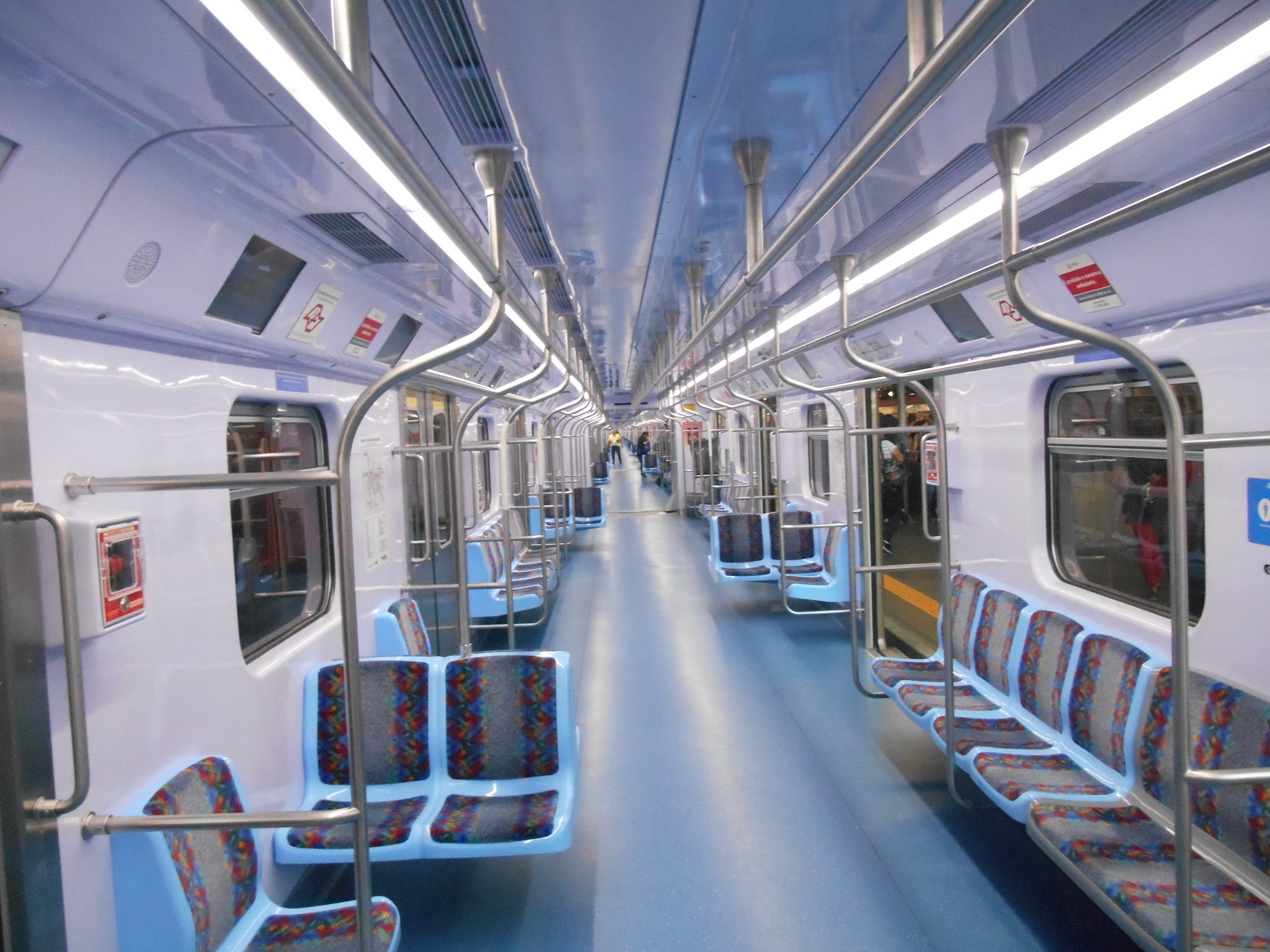
- In service: 2017–present
- Manufacturer: Hyundai Rotem
- Built at: Araraquara, São Paulo
- Constructed: 2017–2019
- Entered service: 16 June 2017
- Number built: 30
- Number in service: 30
- Formation: 8-car sets (MC–R1–R2–M+M–R2–R1–MC)
- Fleet numbers: 9501/9502–9619/9620
- Capacity: 2,600
- Operators: TIC Trens
- Depots: Jundiaí Yard; Francisco Morato Train Park; Lapa Yard

Specifications
- Train length: 170 m (557 ft 9 in)
- Height: 4,545 mm (14 ft 10.9 in)
- Floor height: 1,335 mm (4 ft 4.6 in)
- Entry: Step
- Doors: 8 sets of side doors per car
- Wheel diameter: 915 mm (36.0 in)
- Wheelbase: 2,400 mm (7 ft 10 in)
- Maximum speed: 90 km/h (56 mph)
- Weight: 179,000 kg (395,000 lb)
- Traction system: Hyundai Rotem RVS10001DQ0 IGBT–VVVF
- Traction motors: 16 × Hyundai Rotem HRTM-IFS-270A 270 kW (360 hp) asynchronous 3-phase AC
- Power output: 4,320 kW (5,790 hp)
- Acceleration: 0.9 m/s^{2} (3.0 ft/s^{2})
- Deceleration: 1.1 m/s^{2} (3.6 ft/s^{2}) (service); 1.2 m/s^{2} (3.9 ft/s^{2}) (emergency)
- HVAC: Air conditioning
- Electric system(s): 3 kV DC overhead line
- Current collection: Pantograph
- UIC classification: Bo′Bo′+2′2′+2′2′+Bo′Bo′+Bo′Bo′+2′2′+2′2′+Bo′Bo′
- Coupling system: Dellner
- Track gauge: 1,600 mm (5 ft 3 in)

Notes/references
- Sourced from except where noted.

The CPTM Series 9500 is a class of electric multiple units part of the São Paulo Metropolitan Trains rolling stock, built by Hyundai Rotem from 2017 to 2019.

== History ==
In July 2013, a consortium composed by Brazilian company IEASA and Korean Hyundai Rotem won a bid to build 30 trains with 8 cars each to CPTM. The project cost R$789 million (US$365.9 million) and the trains were to be built within 36 months.

With a deadline of July 2016, the first trains were only delivered in January and after a long delay, Hyudai Rotem needed to change plans. This is because their Brazilian partner IESA had to leave the consortium due to bankruptcy. IESA was the one that would assemble the trains in Brazil for the Korean company. After that, the delivery of 22 trains was delayed.

With the departure of IESA, Rotem decided to build their own factory in Araraquara to produce the EMUs. In March 2016, the company invested R$100 million (US$28.6 million) on the opening of its first factory in Latin America, which is now its second largest in the world. The first trains had to be assembled in Asia and finished in CKD process in the new factory. At that moment, a Hyundai Rotem representative stated to press that "[they] don't know how many trains were built at the moment, but [they] are certain that at least one was delivered and is already in tests by CPTM".

After long tests for homologation and certification of the model, in June 2017, the company could operate the first Series 9500 train. From that, the company negotiated a new deadline and began delivering the compositions on time. The last train was delivered by Rotem on 25 February 2019, with the factory going into recess due to lack of new orders.

The 34-month delay for the delivery made CPTM fine Hyundai Rotem R$4.27 million (US$1.22 million). To decrease the delay on deliveries, Rotem also disrespected labour laws and, after a lawsuit filed by the Labour Public Prosecutor's Office (MPT), they were found guilty by the Labour Justice with a R$1 million (US$ 253,517.56) fine. After a conciliation agreement between MPT and Rotem, the fine was reduced to R$400,000 (US$ 101,407.02).

Later, Rotem lost a bidding process for the supply of 62 passenger cars for Vale S.A. The mining company chose Chinese CRRC Qingdao Sifang, bringing protests from the president of the Brazilian Association of Rail Industry (Abifer) and speculations in the press about how much the failures and delays in deliveries on Series 9500 trains weighed on Vale's choice.

== Operation ==
Three compositions operated on Line 13-Jade, but currently all of them operate on Line 7-Ruby.

== Accidents and incidents ==
- 17 December 2018 – A train derailed during a maneuver on Lapa Yard. No one was harmed.

== See also ==
- Line 7 (CPTM)
- Line 10 (CPTM)
- Companhia Paulista de Trens Metropolitanos
- São Paulo Metropolitan Trains rolling stock
