= Itaim Paulista (CPTM) =

Railway station in São Paulo, Brazil

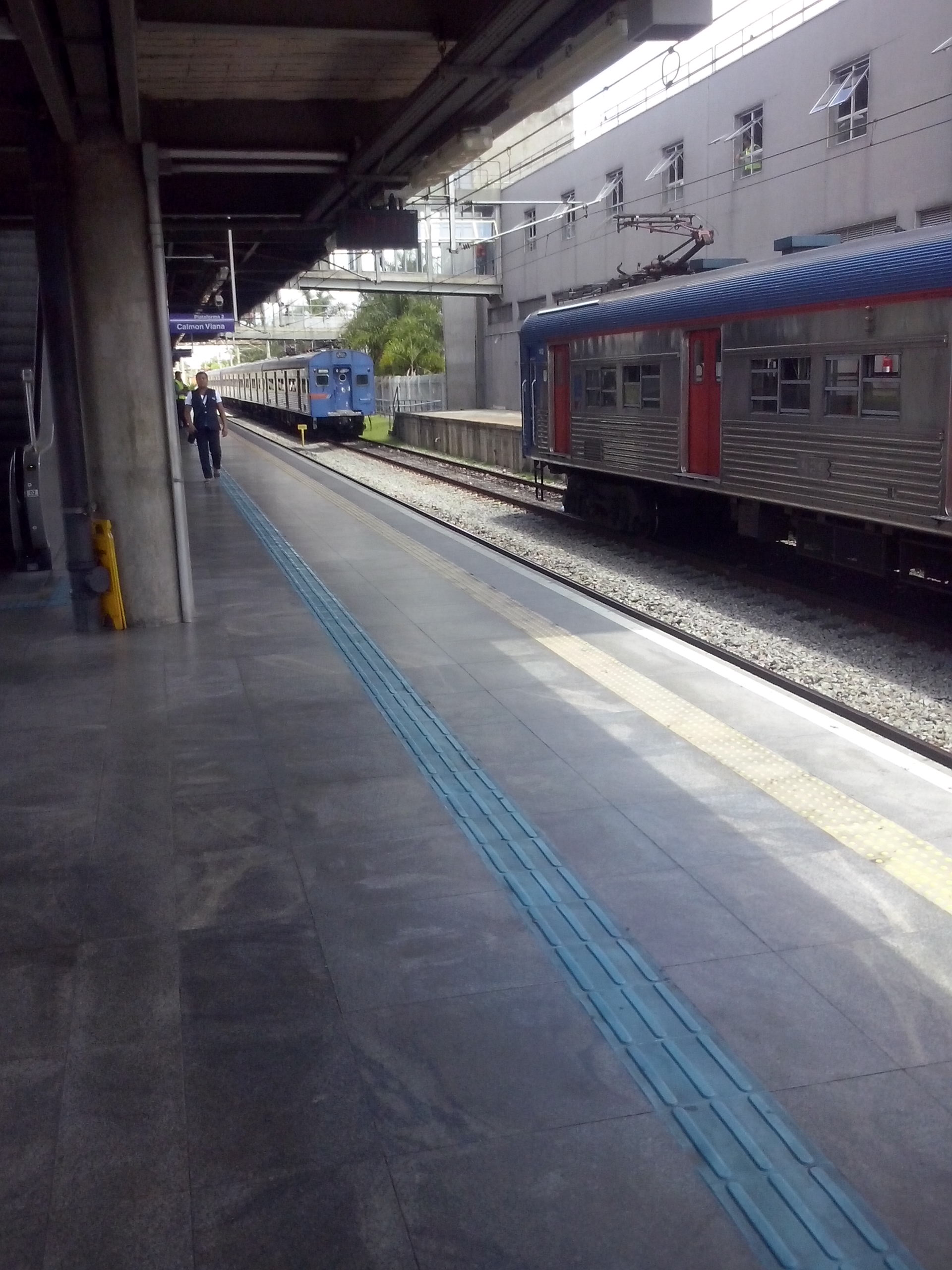

General information
- Location: R. Rafael Correia da Silva, 13; Itaim Paulista; Brazil
- Coordinates: 23.493988°S 46.402264°W
- Owner: Government of the State of São Paulo
- Operator: CPTM
- Platforms: Island platform

Construction
- Structure type: At-grade

Other information
- Station code: ITI

History
- Opened: 7 February 1926
- Rebuilt: 28 May 2008

Services
Preceding station	São Paulo Metropolitan Trains	Following station
Jardim Helena-Vila Mara towards Brás	Line 12	Jardim Romano towards Calmon Viana
Track layout
Location

Itaim Paulista is a train station on CPTM Line 12-Sapphire, located in the district of Itaim Paulista, a few meters from Jardim Helena, facilitating the access for passengers of both neighbourhoods, located in the city of São Paulo.

== History ==
Variante de Poá (or Variante de Calmon Vianna) had its construction initiated in 1921 by EFCB to facilitate the cargo trains route because the lack of bends if compare to the São Paulo branch. The construction of Itaim Paulista was finished and opened on 7 February 1926, but the line was opened only on 1 January 1934, after 8 years of hold in the construction. On 1 March 1962, the station receive the last steam train, which connected Roosevelt station to Itaim Paulista. In 1977, RFFSA hired the Cetenco Engenharia S/A company to rebuild the station. The new building was opened on 6 March 1979 and began being operated by CPTM on 1 June 1994.

=== Project and construction ===
CPTM launched the concurrence no. 8379402011 in January 2005, aiming the making of reform and rebuilt projects of 12 stations, divided in 6 allotments. Itaim Paulista station was allocated on allotment 6, along with Franco da Rocha station. In March 2005, the result of the bidding was presented and ratified, being the allotment 6 won by Sondotécnica/Urbaniza consortium, by the cost of 1,056,808 BRL (631,749.06 USD).

To rebuild the station (beside USP Leste and Comendador Ermelino stations), CPTM opened the concurrence no. 8568402011 on 8 October 2005. The Variante de Poá consortium (formed by Tejofra, O&M, Heleno Fonseca, and SPA) was hired by the cost of 147,062,545.43 BRL (87,912,492.52 USD). In 2006, the 1979 building was demolished to the construction of a new station, according to the modernization project of CPTM Line 12-Sapphire. A catwalk was temporarily built, while the construction was made. The new station was delivered on 28 May 2008.
