= CPTM Series 8000 =

Class of EMU trains

Series 8000
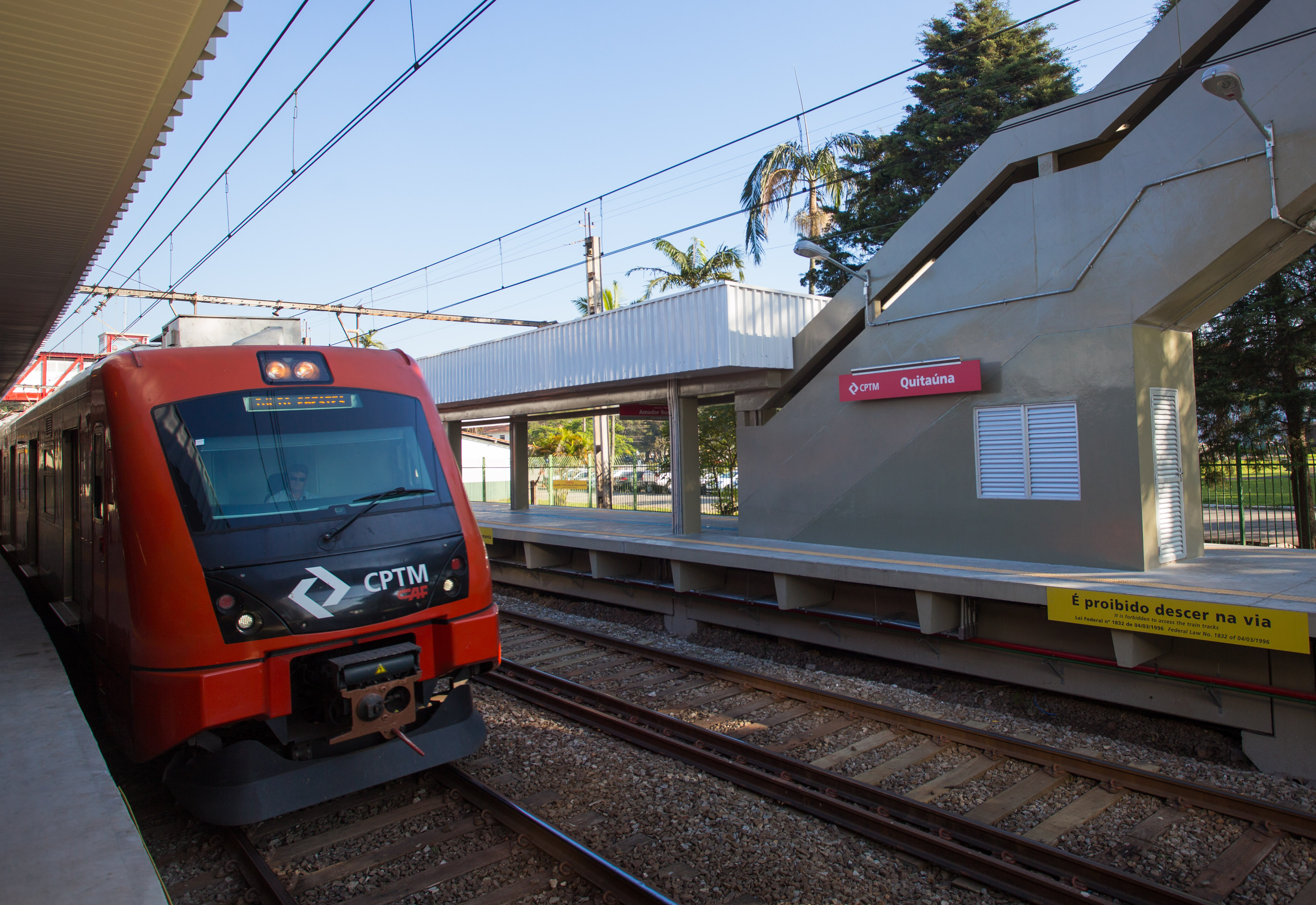

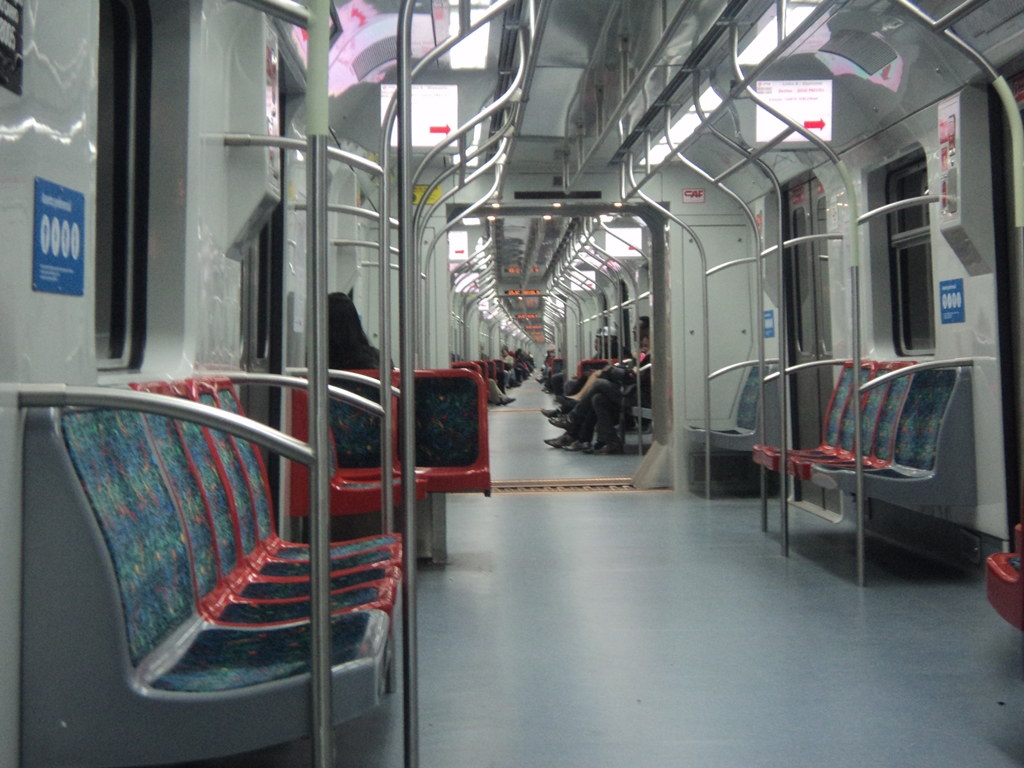
- In service: 2012–present
- Manufacturer: CAF
- Built at: Hortolândia, São Paulo
- Constructed: 2011–2013
- Entered service: 6 February 2012
- Number built: 288 carriages (36 sets)
- Number in service: 288 carriages (36 sets)
- Formation: 8-car sets (MC–R1–R2–M+M–R2–R1–MC)
- Fleet numbers: 8001/8002–8143/8144
- Capacity: 2,264 passengers
- Operator: Companhia Paulista de Trens Metropolitanos
- Depots: Luz shelter; Guaianases Yard; Mogi das Cruzes Yard; Belém Train Park

Specifications
- Car body construction: Stainless steel
- Car length: 21.92 m (71 ft 11 in) (MC); 20.61 m (67 ft 7 in) (R/M)
- Width: 3.05 m (10 ft 0 in)
- Height: 3.93 m (12 ft 11 in)
- Floor height: 1.33 m (4 ft 4 in)
- Platform height: 1.1 m (3 ft 7 in)
- Entry: Step
- Doors: 8 sets of side doors per car
- Wheel diameter: 915 mm (36.0 in)
- Wheelbase: 2,500 mm (8 ft 2 in)
- Maximum speed: 90 km/h (56 mph)
- Weight: 179,000 kg (395,000 lb)
- Traction system: Mitsubishi Electric MAP-264-30VD210 IGBT–VVVF
- Traction motors: 16 × Mitsubishi MB-5136-A 260 kW (350 hp) asynchronous 3-phase AC
- Power output: 4,160 kW (5,580 hp)
- Acceleration: 0.9 m/s^{2} (3.0 ft/s^{2})
- Deceleration: 1.1 m/s^{2} (3.6 ft/s^{2}) (service); 1.2 m/s^{2} (3.9 ft/s^{2}) (emergency)
- HVAC: Air conditioning
- Electric systems: 3 kV DC overhead line
- Current collection: Pantograph
- UIC classification: Bo′Bo′+2′2′+2′2′+Bo′Bo′+Bo′Bo′+2′2′+2′2′+Bo′Bo′
- Braking systems: Regenerative brakes, 2 disc brakes per axle
- Coupling system: Scharfenberg
- Track gauge: 1,600 mm (5 ft 3 in)

The CPTM Series 8000 is class of electric multiple units owned by Construcciones y Auxiliar de Ferrocarriles (CAF) and rented to CPTM in a public-private partnership.

== History ==
=== Project and manufacturing ===
During the modernization process of Line 8-Diamond, CPTM identified the necessity of operation of 36 trains. Due to the company's financial unavailability, a public-private partnership was considered with a train producer. CPTM would hand over 24 Series 5000 trains and workshops in Presidente Altino Yard and the private company would have to build 12 new trains, besides being responsible for the fleet maintenance, paid by CPTM.

The PPP process was launched on 27 May 2009, with an estimated initial investment of the private partner of R$900 million (US$450.1 million) and R$200 million (US$100 million) from the state government for 20 years. The bidding was won by Paulist CTrens consortium, composed by Construcciones y Auxiliar de Ferrocarriles and Inversiones en Concesiones Ferroviarias. However, after the contract signing, the consortium chose to build 36 new trains, financed by the Brazilian Development Bank.

=== Operation ===
The first Series 8000 trains were presented during the reopening of Barueri station, on Line 8-Diamond. The first commercial trip occurred on 6 February 2012.

On 7 July 2019, due to an operational need, the Series 8000 trains began operating on Line 9-Emerald, with the composition 8013–8016.

Due to the concession of lines 8 and 9 on 30 August 2021, 4 Series 8000 trains began operating on Line 11-Coral, with prediction that all of units will operate on this line.

== Accidents and incidents ==
- 2 March 2017 – Collision of two Series 8000 trains on Barueri station. The accident left two people injured.

== See also ==
- Line 11 (CPTM)
- Companhia Paulista de Trens Metropolitanos
- São Paulo Metropolitan Trains rolling stock
