= CPTM Series 9000 =

Series 9000
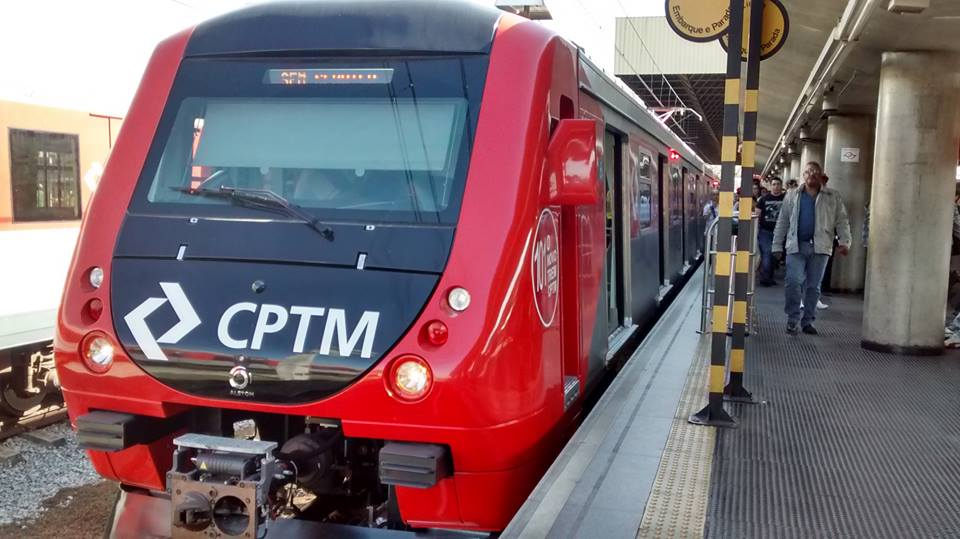
- A Series 9000 train on Guaianases station

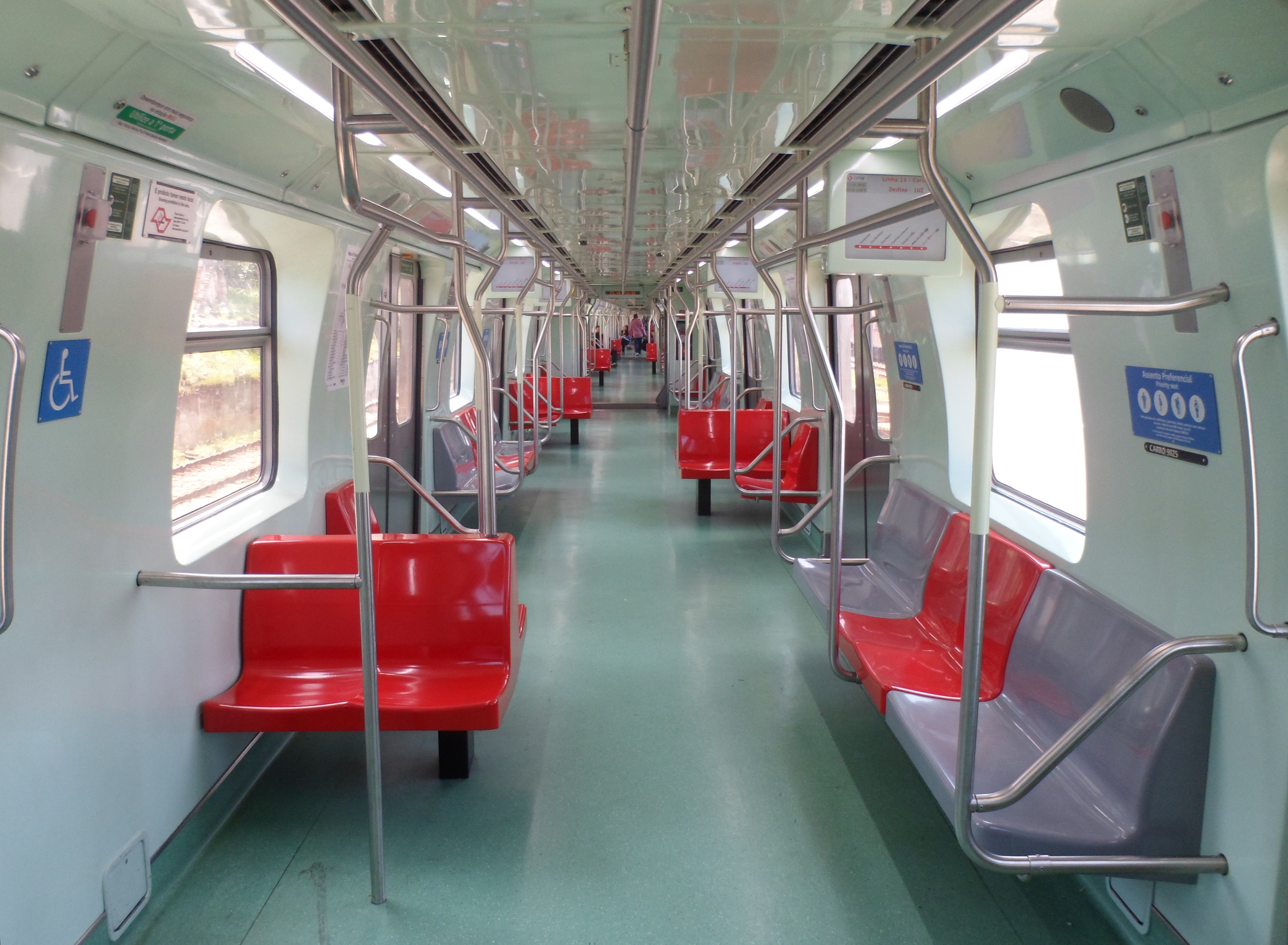
- In service: 2014–present
- Manufacturer: Alstom
- Built at: Lapa, São Paulo
- Family name: Alstom Metropolis
- Constructed: 2012
- Entered service: 10 April 2014
- Number built: 72 carriages (9 sets)
- Number in service: 64 carriages (8 sets)
- Formation: 8-car sets (MC–R1–R2–M–M–R2–R3–MC)
- Fleet numbers: 9001/9002/9003/9004–9033/9034/9035/9036
- Operator: Companhia Paulista de Trens Metropolitanos
- Depot: Presidente Altino Yard

Specifications
- Car body construction: Stainless steel
- Doors: 8 sets of side doors per car
- Wheel diameter: 915 mm (36.0 in)
- Wheelbase: 2,300 mm (7 ft 7 in)
- Maximum speed: 90 km/h (56 mph)
- Traction system: Alstom ONIX 233 XHP IGBT–VVVF
- Traction motors: 16 × Alstom 4ECA2142B 275 kW (369 hp) asynchronous 3-phase AC
- Power output: 4,400 kW (5,900 hp)
- Acceleration: 0.9 m/s^{2} (3.0 ft/s^{2})
- Deceleration: 1.1 m/s^{2} (3.6 ft/s^{2}) (service); 1.2 m/s^{2} (3.9 ft/s^{2}) (emergency)
- HVAC: Air conditioning
- Electric systems: 3 kV DC overhead line
- Current collection: Pantograph
- UIC classification: Bo′Bo′+2′2′+2′2′+Bo′Bo′+Bo′Bo′+2′2′+2′2′+Bo′Bo′
- Coupling system: Scharfenberg
- Track gauge: 1,600 mm (5 ft 3 in)

Notes/references
- Sourced from except where noted.

The CPTM Series 9000 is a class of electric multiple units operating on CPTM Line 11-Coral, later on Line 13-Jade and currently on Line 12-Sapphire. It was built by Alstom on 2012, but began operating on 2014. Each trainset was built with CPTM's new style, having air conditioning, 8 car length, and open gangways, allowing access to all of the cars.

== History ==
When they were delivered in April 2014, the Series 9000 trais operated only on Line 11-Coral, with the objective to enhance the rail transport in São Paulo for the 2014 FIFA World Cup. However, on 11 September 2018, the compositions began operating on Line 13-Jade. In December 2018, one train made tests on Line 12-Sapphire, and a year later, the class began operating on it.

This series was completely certified for full operational service (including peak hours) in the beginning of 2015, but the prototype unit (T01) was the last one to be delivered.

== See also ==
- Line 12 (CPTM)
- Companhia Paulista de Trens Metropolitanos
- São Paulo Metropolitan Trains rolling stock
