= Companhia Paulista de Trens Metropolitanos =

Rapid transit and commuter rail company

Overview
- Main region: Greater São Paulo
- Fleet: 48 Alstom/Bombardier/CAF 2070 Series (6 trains); 64 CRRC 2500 Series (8 trains); 152 CAF 7000 Series (19 trains); 64 CAF 7500 Series (8 trains); 288 CAF 8000 Series (36 trains); 280 CAF 8500 Series (35 trains); 72 Alstom 9000 Series (9 trains)
- Stations called at: 15
- Parent company: State Secretariat of Metropolitan Transport
- Headquarters: São Paulo
- Key people: Michael Sortelo Cerqueira (Chairman)
- Dates of operation: 28 May 1992–present
- Predecessor: CBTU; Fepasa
- Successor: ViaMobilidade; TIC Trens; Trivia Trens

Technical
- Track gauge: 1,600 mm (5 ft 3 in)
- Previous gauge: 1,000 mm (3 ft 3 3/8 in)
- Electrification: Overhead line, 3,000 V DC
- Length: 35 km (22 mi)
- Operating speed: 80 km/h (50 mph)

Other
- Website: www.cptm.sp.gov.br

The Companhia Paulista de Trens Metropolitanos (CPTM) (lit. 'São Paulo Metropolitan Trains Company') is one of the rapid transit companies serving the city of São Paulo, alongside Companhia do Metropolitano de São Paulo, Motiva Linha 4, Motiva Linhas 5 e 17, TIC Trens, ViaMobilidade Linhas 8 e 9 and Trivia Trens, all seven forming the largest metropolitan rail transport network of Latin America. It was created on 28 May 1992, from several railroads that already existed in Greater São Paulo, Brazil.

Part of the Greater São Paulo rail system, the CPTM currently operates 15 stations in a single line, with a total length of 35 kilometres (22 mi). The system carries about 2 million passengers a day. On 7 December 2018, CPTM set a weekday ridership record with 3,221,035 trips.

== History ==
Most of railways now run by the CPTM were built between 1860 and 1957 by the São Paulo Railway (the lines 7 and 10), Estrada de Ferro Sorocabana (the lines 8 and 9) and Estrada de Ferro Central do Brasil (lines 11 and 12). These railways were eventually incorporated into the state-owned Rede Ferroviária Federal (RFFSA) in 1957 and Ferrovia Paulista S.A. (FEPASA) 1971. Finally, in 1992 the urban sections of RFFSA and FEPASA merged, forming the CPTM.

Between the end of the 1990s and the early 2000s, the CPTM began the conversion of some metropolitan lines to provide a service similar to rapid transit and better integrate with the São Paulo Metro. Most of the stations where either rebuilt or modernized and new trains were purchased allowing the headway of lines to be as low as four minutes in some lines. This experience started in the Line E in the year 2000, in the stretch known as "East Express", serving the east end of São Paulo City and running parallel to the Line 3 - Red.

The proposed Trens Intercidades regional railway project is considering using the Line 7 tracks for providing service to neighboring cities of Jundiaí, Campinas and Americana.

In 2018, the CPTM opened the Line 13, the first line completely built and operated by the company. This line connects Line 12 to São Paulo/Guarulhos International Airport, with a special Express service connecting it to the central Palmeiras-Barra Funda station.

In 2021, the operation of Lines 8 and 9 was granted to the private company Via Mobilidade.

== Operation ==
The CPTM operates five lines in the Greater São Paulo area, identified by number and color. Most of these lines run on existing surface tracks that continue out of Greater São Paulo as MRS Logística intercity freight lines and share right of way with freight trains. The more lightly used outer sections of several lines have level crossings.

Service starts every day at 4 AM, when trains depart from each terminus, until the last train leaves at midnight. On Saturdays operation is extended until 1 AM.

The company charges a flat fare that can be paid either by paper ticket sold at the stations or with a rechargeable smartcard, and grants access to any of the rail lines on the Greater São Paulo, including lines operated by the São Paulo Metro.

=== Expresso Turístico ===
The Tourist Express (Tourist Express) is a railway service inaugurated by CPTM on April 18, 2009, with the aim of connecting points of interest located along the network, creating a new tourism option for the metropolitan regions of São Paulo and Jundiaí. Currently, it provides services on weekends varying between the destinations: Jundiaí, Mogi das Cruzes and Paranapiacaba, being the only passenger train to arrive at this last village of Santo André.

== Lines ==
| Line | Color | Termini | Length | Stations | Daily ridership (Apr 2019) |
|---|---|---|---|---|---|
| Line 10 | Turquoise | Palmeiras-Barra Funda ↔ Rio Grande da Serra | 35 km (22 mi) | 15 | 391,000 |

=== Express services ===
| Line | Color | Termini | Length | Stations |
|---|---|---|---|---|
| Line 10 | Line 10 Express | Tamanduateí ↔ Prefeito Celso Daniel-Santo André | 9.2 km (5.7 mi) | 3 |

=== Former services ===
| Line | Color | Termini | Length | Stations |
|---|---|---|---|---|
| Line 7 | Service 710 | Jundiaí ↔ Rio Grande da Serra | 101.7 km (63.2 mi) | 32 |
| Line 10 | Service 710 | Jundiaí ↔ Rio Grande da Serra | 101.7 km (63.2 mi) | 32 |
| Line 10 | Line 10+ Express | Luz ↔ Prefeito Celso Daniel-Santo André | 17.7 km (11.0 mi) | 5 |
| Line 13 | Connect | Brás ↔ Aeroporto-Guarulhos | 25.2 km (15.7 mi) | 5 |

=== Future developments ===
Under Construction
| Line | Color | Termini | Length | Stations |
|---|---|---|---|---|
| Line 11 | Coral | Penha | —N/a | 1 |

Planned
| Line | Color | Termini | Length | Stations |
|---|---|---|---|---|
| Line 10 | Turquoise | Bom Retiro | —N/a | 1 |
| Line 10 | Turquoise | Cerealista | —N/a | 1 |
| Line 10 | Turquoise | Parque da Mooca | —N/a | 1 |
| Line 10 | Turquoise | ABC | —N/a | 1 |
| Line 14 | Onyx | Bonsucesso ↔ Jardim Irene | 39 km (24 mi) | 23 |
| Line 24 | Quartz | Santana de Parnaíba ↔ Campo Limpo | 34 km (21 mi) | 21 |
| Line 25 | Topaz | Embu das Artes ↔ ABC | 43 km (27 mi) | 25 |
| Line 26 | Amethyst | Sanazar ↔ Imperador | 41 km (25 mi) | 23 |

== Gallery ==
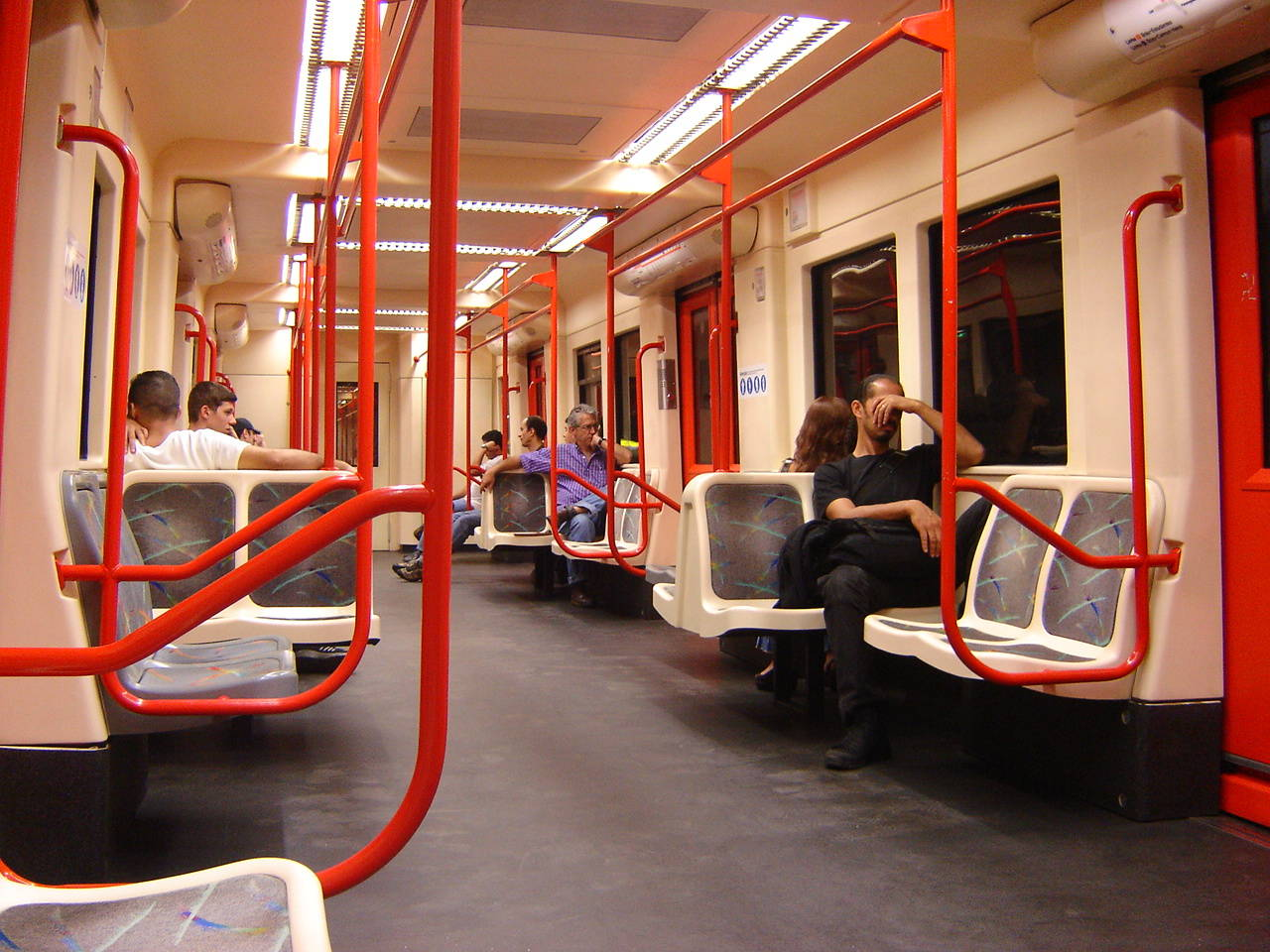
Internal view of a 2000 Series CPTM train

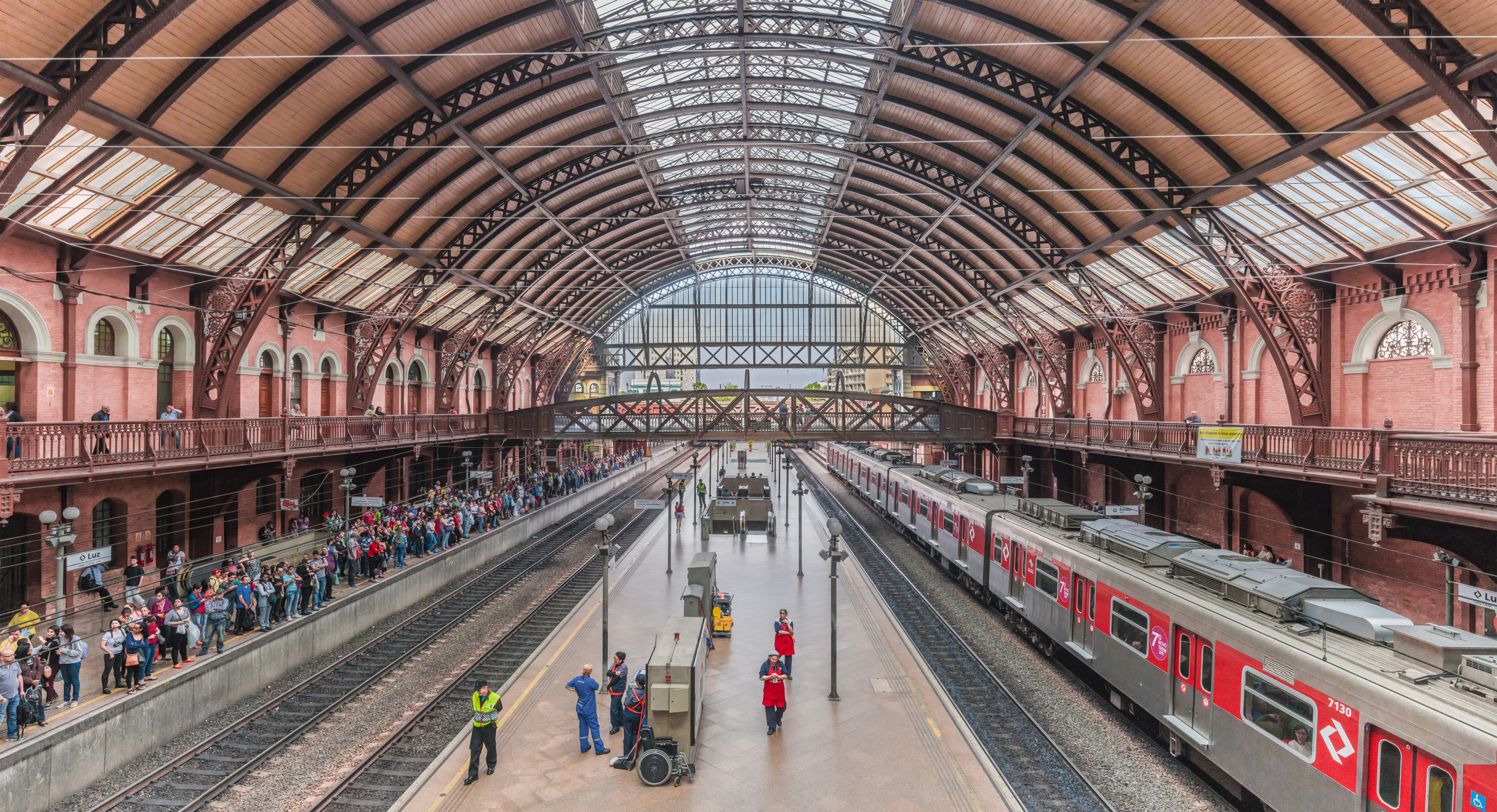
Luz Station.

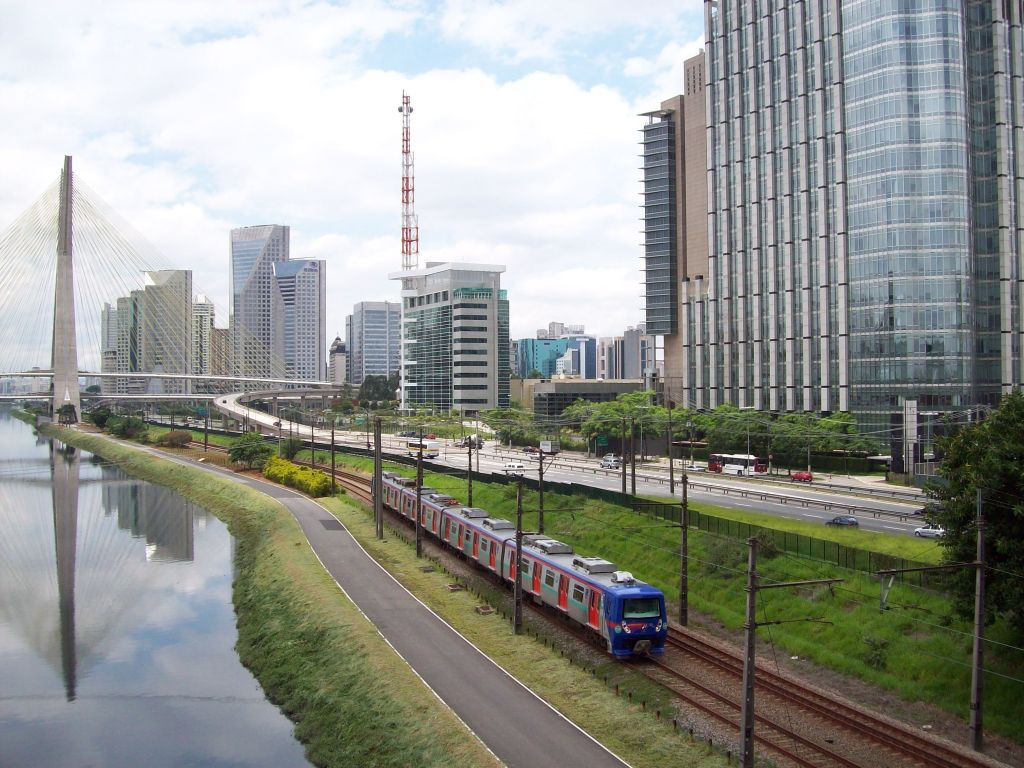
CPTM 2070 Series train in Brooklin CBD.

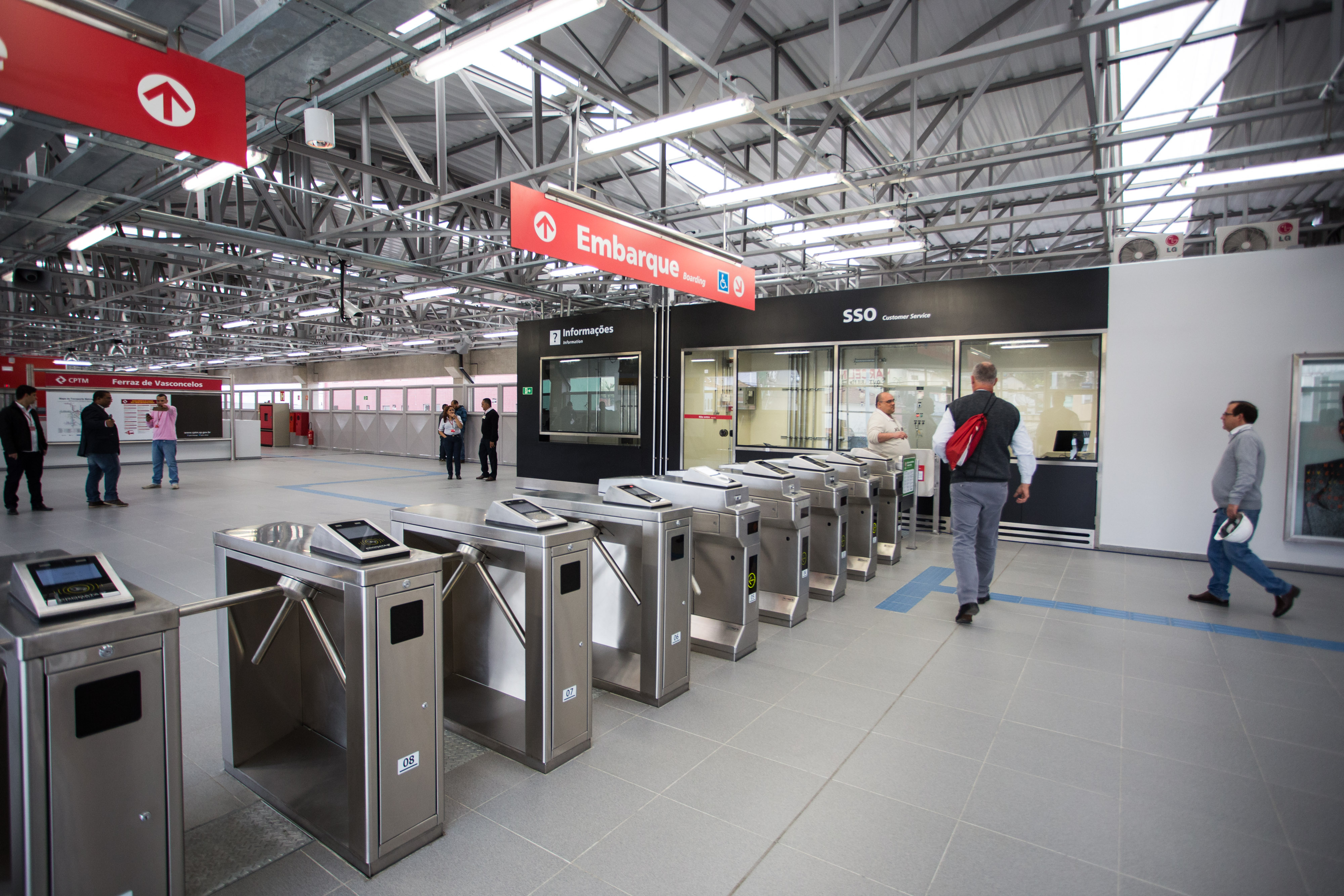
Ferraz de Vasconcelos Station.

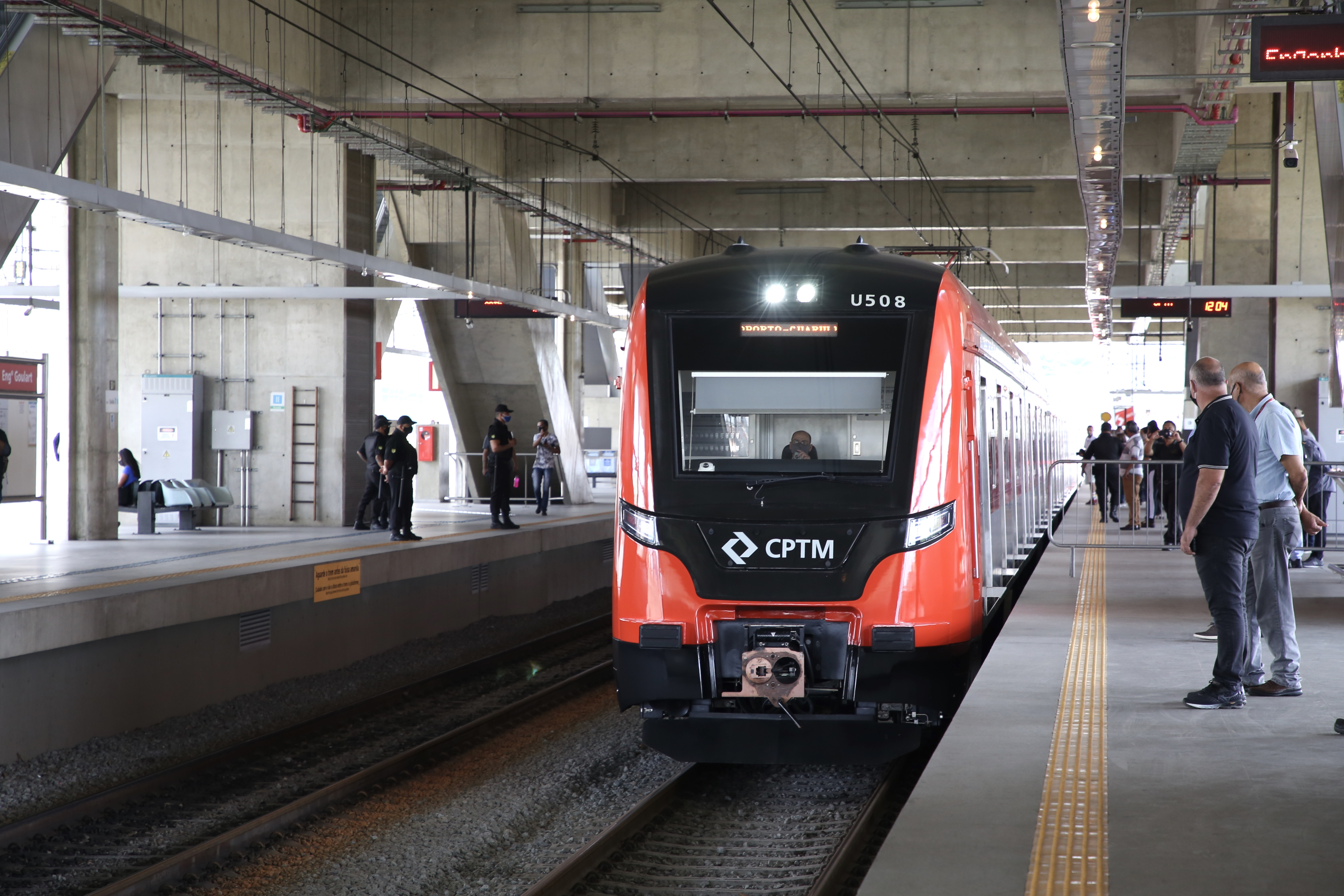
Engenheiro Goulart Station

== See also ==
- São Paulo Metropolitan Trains - São Paulo Metropolitan system
- São Paulo Metropolitan Trains rolling stock
- São Paulo Metro
- List of suburban and commuter rail systems
- Transport in São Paulo
- Bike station
