= CPTM Series 2500 =

Class of EMU trains

Series 2500
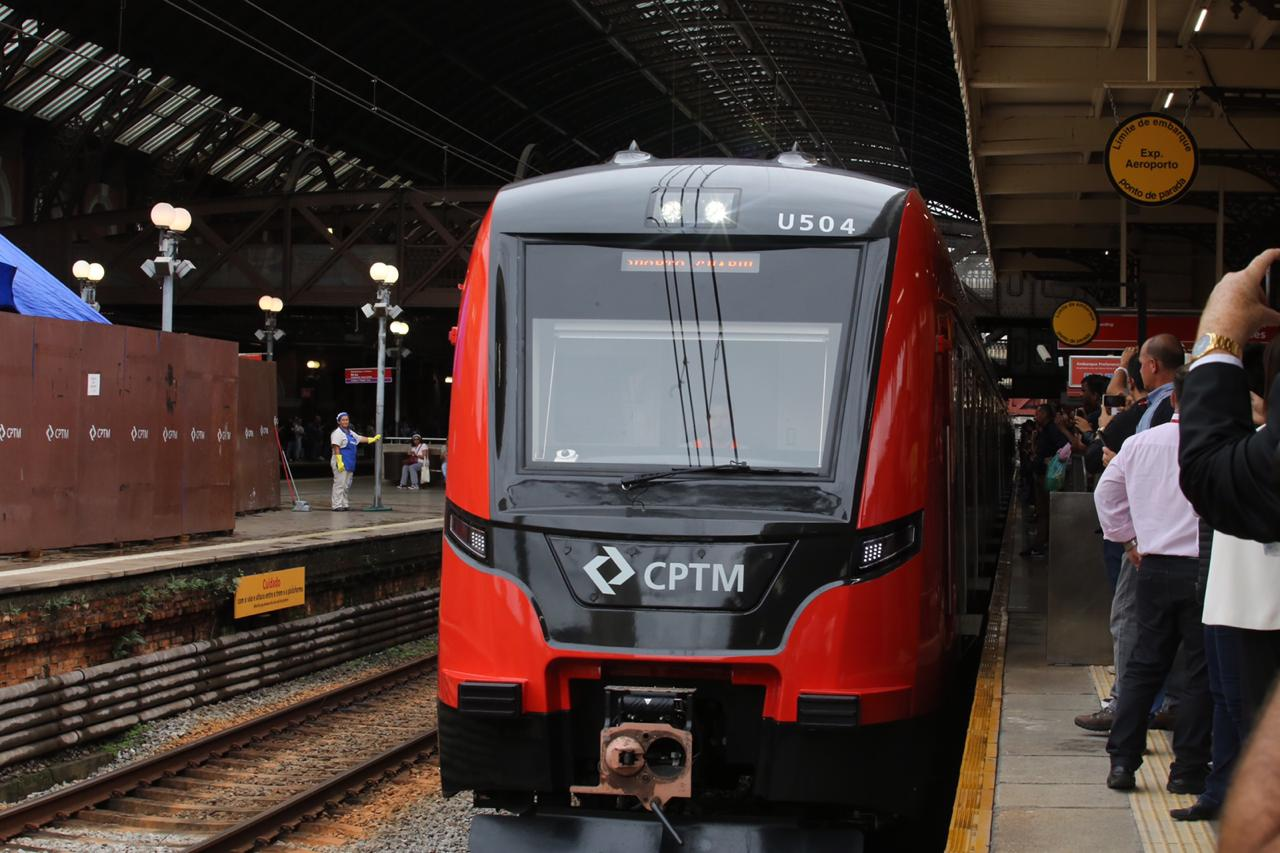

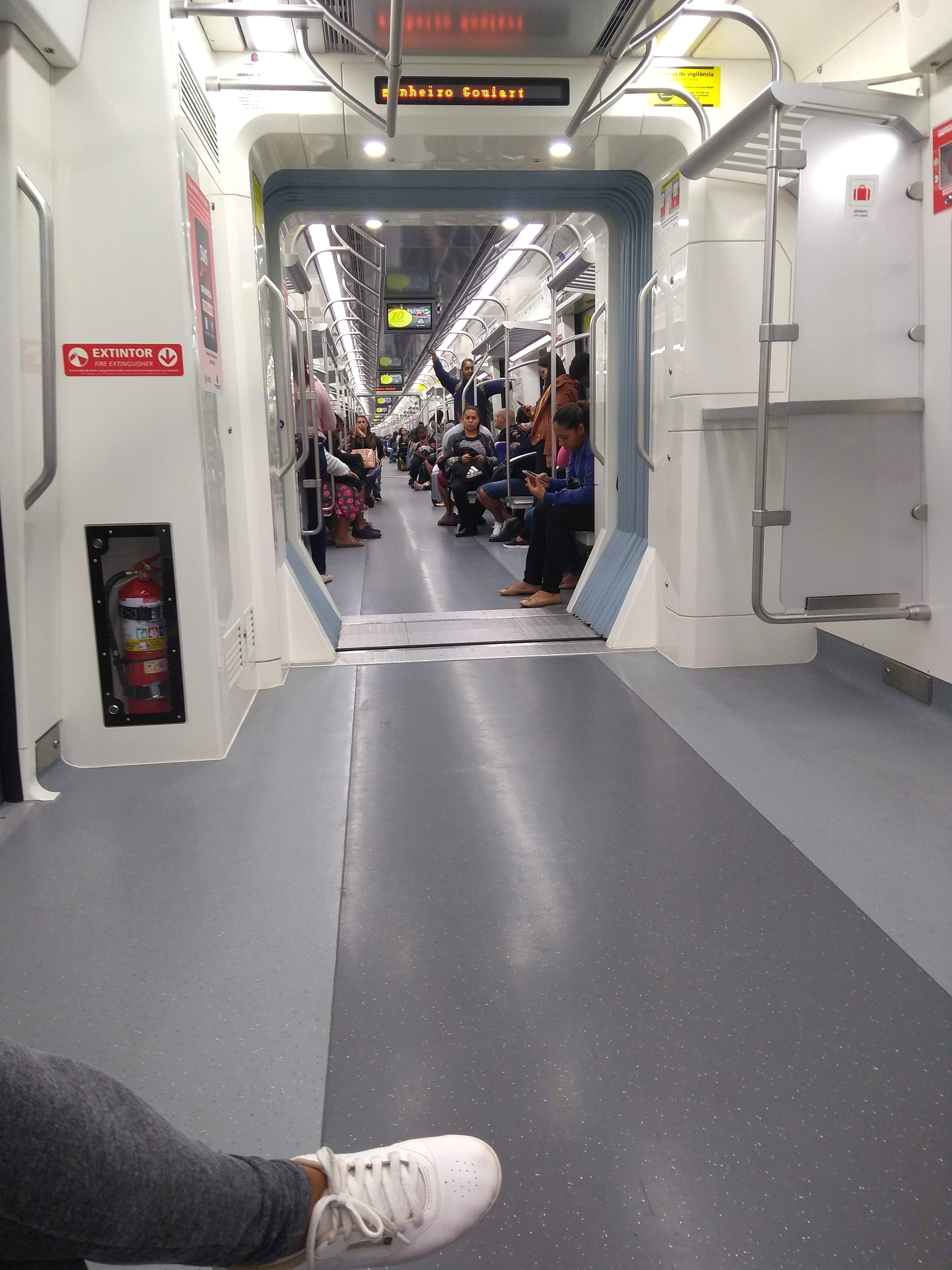
- In service: 2020–present
- Manufacturer: CRRC Qingdao Sifang
- Built at: (China) Qingdao, Shandong
- Constructed: 2017–2019
- Entered service: 3 February 2020
- Number built: 64 carriages (8 sets)
- Number in service: 64 carriages (8 sets)
- Formation: 8-car sets
- Fleet numbers: 2501/2502/2503/2504–2529/2530/2531/2532
- Capacity: 2,600
- Operators: Companhia Paulista de Trens Metropolitanos
- Depots: Presidente Altino Yard
- Lines served: – 64 cars (8 trains)

Specifications
- Entry: Level
- Maximum speed: 90 km/h (56 mph)
- Traction system: Zhuzhou CRRC Times Electric IGBT-VVVF inverter
- Traction motors: CRRC Zhuzhou YQ-280
- HVAC: Air conditioning
- Electric system(s): 3 kV DC overhead line
- Current collection: Pantograph
- Coupling system: Scharfenberg
- Track gauge: 1,600 mm (5 ft 3 in)

The CPTM Series 2500 is a class of electric multiple units built by CRRC Qingdao Sifang between 2017 and 2019 to operate on CPTM Line 13-Jade.

== History ==
The series of EMUs was built by a consortium composed of Chinese CRRC Qingdao Sifang and Spanish company based in Brazil Temoinsa. The consortium won a public bidding for the production of eight trains that would be operated on CPTM Line 13, which connects the Guarulhos Airport to the rest of the metropolitan network.

The bidding was made by CPTM in March 2016, but the winner was announced only in the final days of the year, after a long analysis by the European Investment Bank, which made available €85 million (R$317 million) for the project. Spanish CAF and Korean Rotem filed an injunction against the result days after the announcement, but it was later rejected in August 2017, allowing the signature of the contract.

The proposals presented for this contract were:

- 1st Place – Consórcio Temoinsa–Sifang, with a cost of R$316,720,807.00 (US$ 90,717,156.07)
- 2nd Place – Hyundai Rotem, with a cost of R$326,144,738.00 (US$ 93,416,417.38)
- 3rd Place – Construcciones y Auxiliar de Ferrocarriles (CAF) do Brasil Ltda, with a cost of R$396,659,450.00 (US$ 113,613,682.58)

With the CRRC winning, the new trains became the first ones of the company built in China.

The main differential from the rest of the rolling stock is that the compositions are equipped with luggage racks for passengers carrying baggage and the presence of individual door opening buttons, which, at first, are not used by the company.

According to the contract, the delivers should be concluded by August 2019. However, due to delays, only the first train was delivered in September, with other two delivered in the beginning of November.

== Controversies ==
The great difference between the proposals presented in the bidding is due to the fact that Rotem and CAF proposed to build the trains in Brazil (as per requirement of nationalization made by the state of São Paulo, a request made by a lobby of the Brazilian Association of Railway Industry), while Sifang proposed the construction in China and nationalization by a CKD assembly by Temoinsa Brazilian branch. Due to this proposal, the bidding result was questioned by the Spanish and Korean companies, who opened factories in Brazil to attend this requirements for assembly. The questions were not successful, besides the delay of the bidding process.

Temoinsa, along with CAF, is one of the companies involved in the São Paulo public transit bidding scandal, with the Public Prosecutor's Office requesting their dissolution, later unsuccessful, in 2015. In 2017, the Public Prosecutor's Office requested the arrests of the companies' representatives (including CPTM itself and other private companies) for their involvement in the case.

== Service ==
The first train was expected to be fully operational in December 2019, but CPTM stated they didn't have a date to conclude the tests. On 21 January 2020, the State Secretary of Metropolitan Transports affirmed that, due to a request of CRRC and as a safety measure for passengers, the operation of the new Line 13 trains would be postponed. He also estimated the operation for 30 days after his statement. The other compositions should begin operating on the line until April 2020, according to the company. However, in October 2020, the São Paulo State Government stated the intention to deliver the compositions until December. In November, other two compositions were delivered and other three in December. Lastly, the last train was delivered in March 2021.

== See also ==
- Line 13 (CPTM)
- Companhia Paulista de Trens Metropolitanos
