= CPTM Series 8500 =

Class of EMU trains

Series 8500
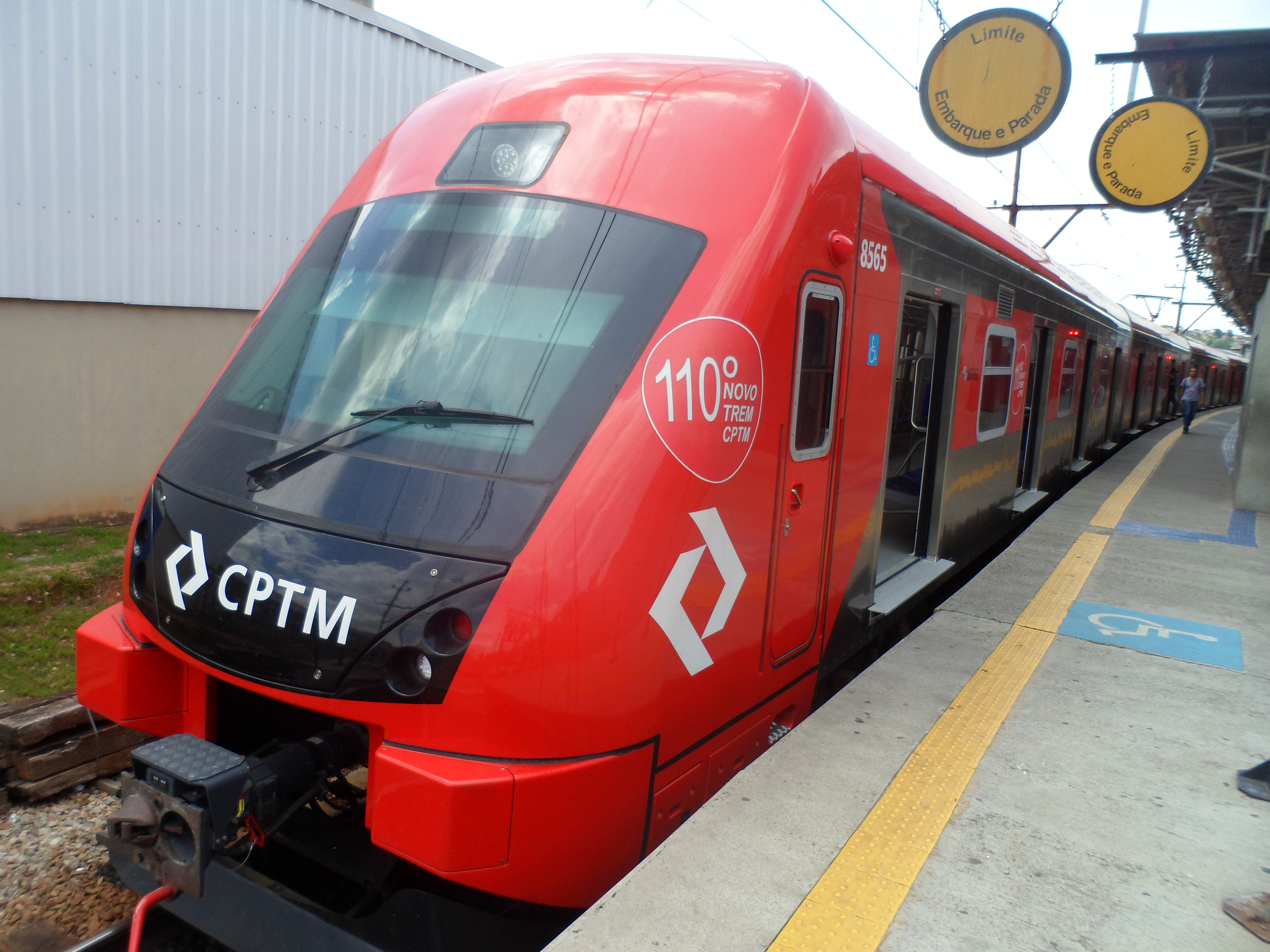

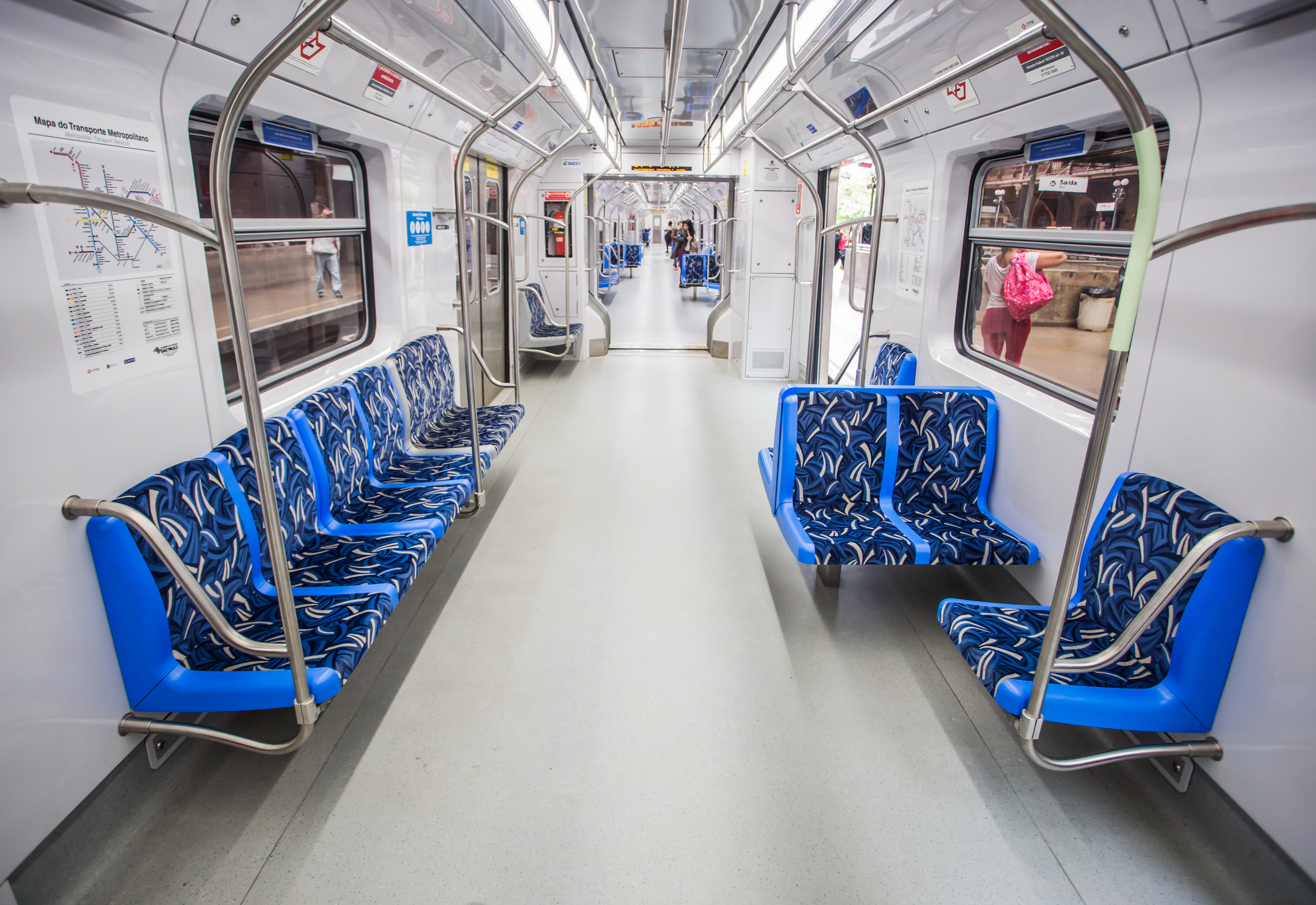
- In service: 2016–present
- Manufacturer: CAF
- Built at: Hortolândia, São Paulo
- Constructed: 2015–2019
- Entered service: 6 July 2016
- Number built: 280 carriages (35 sets)
- Number in service: 264 carriages (33 sets)
- Formation: 8-car sets (MC–R1–R2–M+M–R2–R1–MC)
- Fleet numbers: 8501/8502–8639/8640
- Capacity: 2,600
- Operator: Companhia Paulista de Trens Metropolitanos
- Depots: Jundiaí Yard; Francisco Morato Train Park; Presidente Altino Yard; Brás Yard
- Lines served: – 26 sets; – 7 sets

Specifications
- Train length: 170,055 mm (557 ft 11.1 in)
- Width: 3.3 m (10 ft 10 in)
- Height: 4,402 mm (14 ft 5.3 in)
- Floor height: 1,335 mm (4 ft 4.6 in)
- Entry: Step
- Doors: 8 sets of side doors per car
- Wheel diameter: new–worn: 915–825 mm (36.0–32.5 in)
- Wheelbase: 2,500 mm (8 ft 2 in)
- Maximum speed: 90 km/h (56 mph)
- Traction system: CAF IGBT–VVVF inverter Train parts code: C.H4.76.101.01; Product code: AA.40.0A.0001
- Traction motors: 16 × Mitsubishi Electric MB-5136-D 270 kW (360 hp) asynchronous 3-phase AC motors
- Power output: 4,320 kW (5,790 hp)
- Transmission: 2-stage reduction gear ratio: 7.512
- Acceleration: 0.9 m/s^{2} (3.0 ft/s^{2})
- Deceleration: 1.1 m/s^{2} (3.6 ft/s^{2}) (service); 1.2 m/s^{2} (3.9 ft/s^{2}) (emergency)
- Auxiliaries: MEDCOM PSM-195 IGBT Auxiliary Power Supply Box (195 kVA)
- HVAC: Air conditioning
- Electric systems: 3 kV DC overhead line
- Current collection: Pantograph
- UIC classification: Bo′Bo′+2′2′+2′2′+Bo′Bo′+Bo′Bo′+2′2′+2′2′+Bo′Bo′
- Coupling system: Scharfenberg
- Track gauge: 1,600 mm (5 ft 3 in)

Notes/references
- Sourced from except where noted.

The CPTM Series 8500 is a class electric multiple units built by CAF from 2015 and 2019 for the São Paulo Metropolitan Trains rolling stock.

== History ==
=== Project and construction ===
CPTm made a bidding in the end of 2012 estimating the acquisition of 65 news trains. Due to lack of participants, the process was cancelled a new international bidding process was launched in the beginning of 2013. The winning proposals were announced on 15 July 2013, at a cost of R$ 1.8 billion (US$ 834.8 million).

The companies delayed their deliveries. While Hyundai Rotem took 34 months beyond the estimated deadline, CAF concluded the delivery of their last unit 39 months after the estimated time. Due to the delays, the company was fined by CPTM. The amount of fines reached R$ 8.37 million (US$ 2.39 million). Besides CAF's appeal, their motion was denied by the Court of Justice of São Paulo.

=== Operation ===
The first train was delivered on 6 July 2016, operating on Line 11-Coral. Some compositions also operated on Line 7-Ruby but, since January 2019, all of them operated only on Line 11.

Initially, the Series 8500 trains were expected to be distributed to all of the CPTM lines, but all of them were transferred to Line 11. After 39 months of delay, the last train was delivered in November 2019.

On 20 May 2021, unit 8541–8544 operated on Line 8-Diamond for tests, due to the privatization of Lines 8 and 9, with 8 units operating on these lines currently.

Due to the concession of Lines 8 and 9 to ViaMobilidade on 30 August 2021, a Series 8500 train began operating on Line 7-Ruby along with Line 10-Turquoise, as unit 8621–8623, with estimation of other 28 compositions to operate on these lines.

On 17 September 2021, this class began operating on Line 12-Sapphire, as unit 8617–8620, and on Line 9-Emerald, on 9 November 2021, as unit 8505–8508. Both cases are due to the ViaMobilidade concession. Currently, two units are out of service.

== See also ==
- Line 7 (CPTM)
- Line 9 (CPTM)
- Line 10 (CPTM)
- Line 12 (CPTM)
- Companhia Paulista de Trens Metropolitanos
- ViaMobilidade
- São Paulo Metropolitan Trains rolling stock
