= Line 12 (CPTM) =

Line 12 (Sapphire)
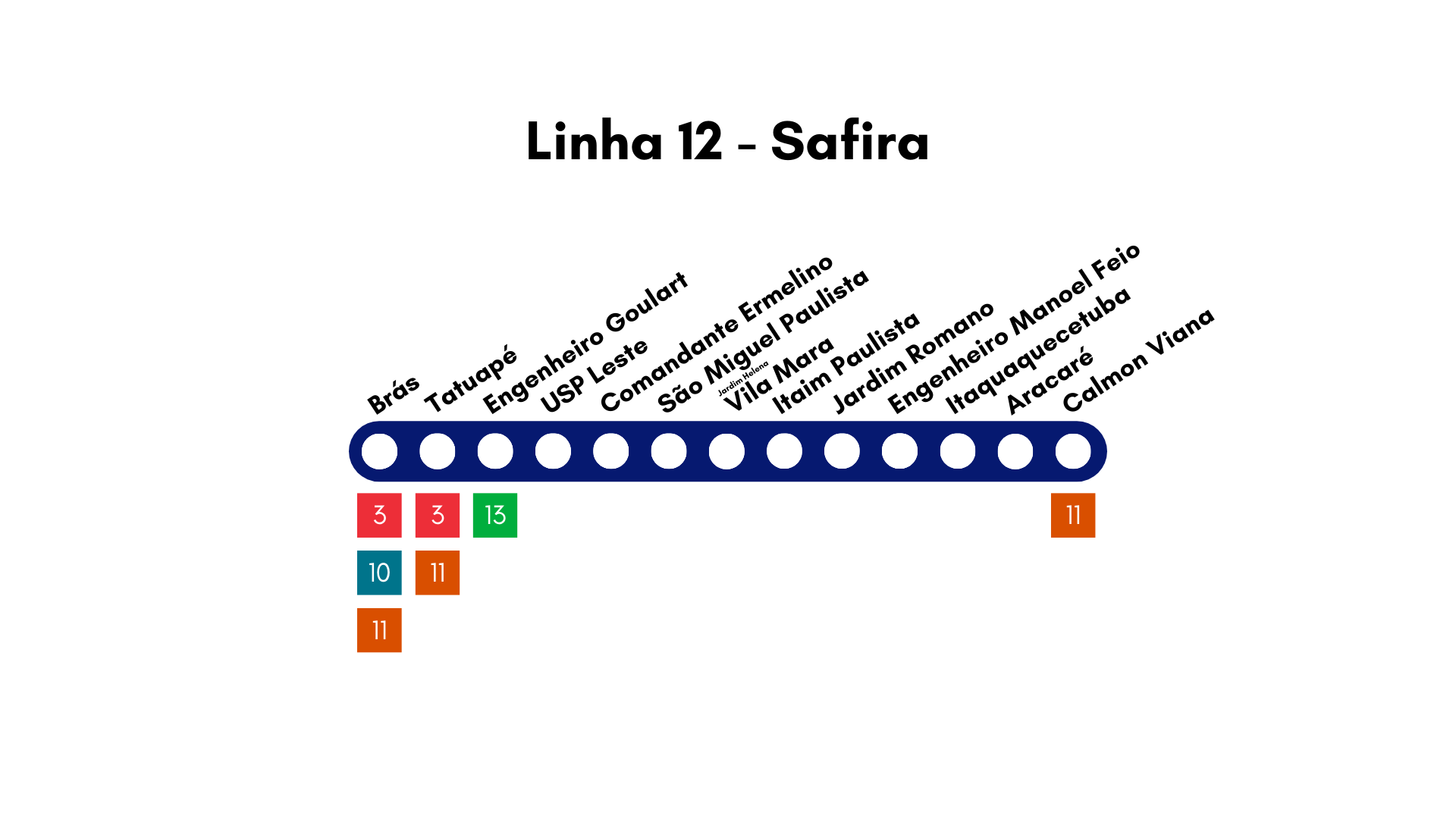

Overview
- Status: Operational
- Owner: Government of the State of São Paulo
- Locale: Greater São Paulo, Brazil
- Termini: Brás; Calmon Viana
- Connecting lines: Current: Planned:
- Stations: 13 in operation 3 in project

Service
- Type: Commuter rail
- System: São Paulo Metropolitan Trains
- Operator(s): CPTM
- Depot(s): Manoel Feio rail yard Roosevelt rail yard
- Rolling stock: Ex 72 CAF/ADTranz/Alstom 2000 Series (9 trains); 40 Alstom/Bombardier/CAF 2070 Series (5 trains); 280 CAF 8500 Series (35 trains); 72 Alstom 9000 Series (9 trains)

History
- Opened: 1 April 1934; 91 years ago (Note: As part of Estrada de Ferro Central do Brasil)

Technical
- Line length: 39 km (24 mi)
- Track gauge: 1,600 mm (5 ft 3 in)
- Electrification: Overhead line, 3,000 V DC
- Operating speed: 90 km/h (56 mph)
- Signalling: Automatic block signaling

Line 12 (Sapphire) (Portuguese: Linha 12–Safira), formerly Line F (Purple), is one of the thirteen lines that make up the São Paulo Metro Rail Transport Network in Brazil and one of the five lines operated by CPTM.

== Stations ==
Code	Station	Platforms	Position	Connections	City
BAS	Brás	Island and side platforms	At-grade	Brás Bus Terminal	São Paulo
TAT	Tatuapé	Island platforms	At-grade	North Tatuapé Bus Terminal; South Tatuapé Bus Terminal	São Paulo
EGO	Engenheiro Goulart	Island platforms	At-grade	Companhia Paulista de Trens Metropolitanos Line 13 (CPTM)	São Paulo
USL	USP Leste	Island platform	At-grade	-	São Paulo
ERM	Comendador Ermelino	Island platform	At-grade	-	São Paulo
SMP	São Miguel Paulista	Island platform	At-grade	(Planned)	São Paulo
JHE	Jardim Helena-Vila Mara	Island platform	At-grade	-	São Paulo
ITI	Itaim Paulista	Island platform	At-grade	-	São Paulo
JRO	Jardim Romano	Island platform	At-grade	-	São Paulo
EMF	Engenheiro Manoel Feio	Side platforms	At-grade	Manoel Feio Bus Terminal	Itaquaquecetuba
ITQ	Itaquaquecetuba	Island platform	At-grade	-	Itaquaquecetuba
ARC	Aracaré	Island platform	At-grade	-	Itaquaquecetuba
CMV	Calmon Viana	Island and side platforms	At-grade	Companhia Paulista de Trens Metropolitanos Line 11 (CPTM)	Poá
