= São Paulo Municipal Government =

Subdivision of the Brazilian government

São Paulo Municipal Government Portuguese: Governo Municipal de São Paulo
- Coat of arms of São Paulo
- Formation: 25 January 1554
- Founding document: Organic Law of the Municipality
- State: São Paulo
- Website: www.prefeitura.sp.gov.br

Legislative branch
- Legislature: Municipal Chamber of São Paulo
- Council members: 55
- Meeting place: Anchieta Palace

Executive branch
- Mayor: Mayor of São Paulo
- Headquarters: Matarazzo Building
- Departments: 35

The São Paulo Municipal Government, composed of the Executive and the Legislative branches, is based in São Paulo, which is the main financial, corporate and commercial center in Latin America and the largest city in the Southern Hemisphere. It had 11.451.245 inhabitants in 2022.

== Executive ==
=== Direct administration ===
The executive is represented by the mayor and his cabinet of secretaries, according to the model proposed by the Federal Constitution. Since 2004, it has been based in the Matarazzo Building, built in the 1930s. The mayor and vice-mayor are elected by universal suffrage and direct and secret ballot by the population for 4-year terms, with the possibility of re-election for another consecutive term. Eligibility requirements for both positions are Brazilian nationality, exercise of political rights, electoral domicile in the city, party membership and a minimum age of 21.

The current mayor is Ricarno Nunes, who was vice-mayor and assumed the position on May 16, 2021, when former mayor Bruno Covas passed away. According to Municipal Law No. 13,776 of April 13, 2022, the municipal government is composed of 26 secretariats:

- Municipal Department of Finance (Portuguese: Secretaria Municipal da Fazenda - SF);
- Municipal Department of Justice (Secretaria Municipal de Justiça - SMJ);
- Municipal Department of Management (Secretaria Municipal de Gestão - SG);
- Municipal Department of Education (Secretaria Municipal de Educação - SME);
- Municipal Department of Health (Secretaria Municipal da Saúde - SMS);
- Municipal Secretariat for Social Assistance and Development (Secretaria Municipal de Assistência e Desenvolvimento Social - SMADS);
- Municipal Department of Sports and Leisure (Secretaria Municipal de Esportes e Lazer - SEME);
- Municipal Department of Culture (Secretaria Municipal de Cultura - SMC);
- Municipal Secretariat for Human Rights and Citizenship (Secretaria Municipal de Direitos Humanos e Cidadania - SMDHC);
- Municipal Department for People with Disabilities (Secretaria Municipal da Pessoa com Deficiência - SMPED);
- Municipal Department of Urban Planning and Licensing (Secretaria Municipal de Urbanismo e Licenciamento - SMUL);
- Municipal Secretariat for Urban Infrastructure and Works (Secretaria Municipal de Infraestrutura Urbana e Obras - SIURB);
- Municipal Secretariat for Sub-prefectures (Secretaria Municipal das Subprefeituras - SMSUB);
- Municipal Secretariat for Economic Development and Labor (Secretaria Municipal de Desenvolvimento Econômico e Trabalho - SMDET);
- Municipal Department of Mobility and Traffic (Secretaria Municipal de Mobilidade e Trânsito - SMT);
- Municipal Department of Environment and Greenery (Secretaria Municipal do Verde e do Meio Ambiente - SVMA);
- Municipal Department of Housing (Secretaria Municipal de Habitação - SEHAB);
- Municipal Secretariat for Urban Security (Secretaria Municipal de Segurança Urbana - SMSU);
- Municipal Secretariat for Innovation and Technology (Secretaria Municipal de Inovação e Tecnologia - SMIT);
- Municipal Secretariat for International Relations (Secretaria Municipal de Relações Internacionais - SMRI);
- Municipal Department of Tourism (Secretaria Municipal de Turismo - SMTUR);
- Comptroller General of the Municipality (Controladoria Geral do Município - CGM);
- Attorney General's Office (Procuradoria Geral do Município - PGM);
- Municipal Government Secretariat (Secretaria do Governo Municipal - SGM);
- Civil House.

There are also municipal councils dealing with different issues and composed of representatives from different sectors of organized civil society. The active municipal councils are:

- Municipal Council for Children and Adolescents (Conselho Municipal da Criança e do Adolescente - CMDCA);
- Municipal Council for Science, Technology and Innovation (Conselho Municipal de Ciência, Tecnologia e Inovação - CMCT&I);
- Municipal Council for People with Disabilities (Conselho Municipal da Pessoa com Deficiência - CMDP);
- Municipal Council for Education (Conselho Municipal de Educação - CME);
- Municipal Council for Housing (Conselho Municipal de Habitação - CMH);
- Municipal Council for the Environment and Sustainable Development (Conselho Municipal do Meio Ambiente e Desenvolvimento Sustentável - CADES);
- Municipal Council of Health (Conselho Municipal de Saúde - CMS);
- Municipal Council for Tourism (Conselho Municipal de Turismo - COMTUR);
- Municipal Council for Social Assistance (Conselho Municipal da Assistência Social - COMAS);
- Municipal Council for Public Policies on Drugs and Alcohol (Conselho Municipal de Políticas sobre Drogas e Álcool - COMUDA).

=== Indirect administration ===
==== Autarchies ====
- São Paulo Municipal Welfare Institute (Instituto de Previdência Municipal de São Paulo);
- Municipal Public Servants Hospital (Hospital do Servidor Público Municipal);
- Municipal Public Services Regulatory Agency of São Paulo (Agência Reguladora de Serviços Públicos do Município de São Paulo - SP Regula).

==== Public companies ====
- São Paulo Turismo S/A (SPTURIS);
- Companhia de Engenharia de Tráfego (CET);
- Companhia Metropolitana de Habitação de São Paulo (COHAB);
- Empresa de Tecnologia da Informação e Comunicação do Município de São Paulo (PRODAM);
- São Paulo Transporte S/A (SPTrans);
- Empresa de Cinema e Audiovisual de São Paulo (SPCine);
- São Paulo Parcerias (SPParcerias);
- São Paulo Obras (SPObras);
- Companhia São Paulo de Desenvolvimento e Mobilização de Ativos (SPDA);
- São Paulo Urbanismo;
- São Paulo Negócios.

==== Foundations ====
- São Paulo Foundation for Education, Technology and Culture (Fundação Paulistana de Educação, Tecnologia e Cultura);
  - Cidade Tiradentes Cultural Training Center (Centro de Formação Cultural Cidade Tiradentes);
  - Professor Makiguti Technical School of Public Health (Escola Técnica de Saúde Pública Professor Makiguti);
- São Paulo Municipal Theater Foundation (Fundação Theatro Municipal de São Paulo);

== Sub-prefectures ==
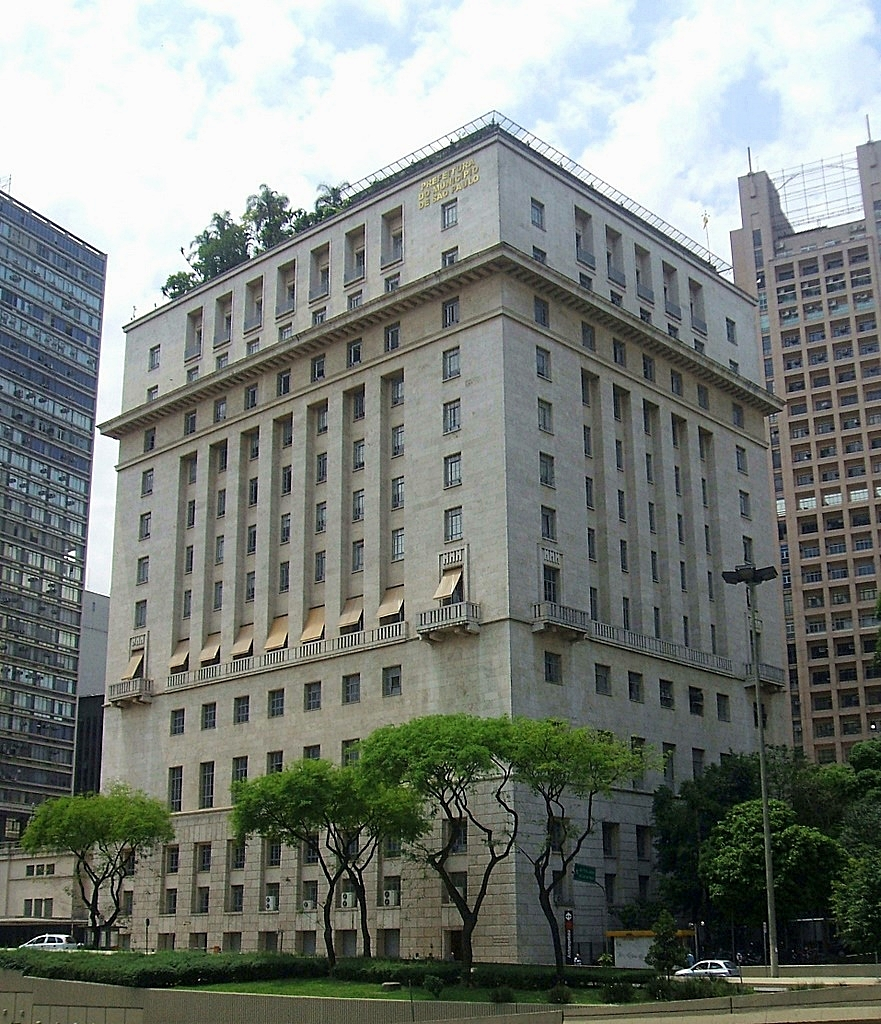
Matarazzo Building.

On August 1, 2002, Law No. 13,999 subdivided the municipality of São Paulo into 31 sub-prefectures, which administer the 96 districts. The departments are administered by sub-mayors, who are freely appointed by the City Hall. Each subprefecture has a board composed of civil society representatives appointed every two years. Currently, the subprefectures are:

- Aricanduva/Formosa/Carrão;
- Butantã;
- Campo Limpo;
- Capela do Socorro;
- Casa Verde;
- Cidade Ademar;
- Cidade Tiradentes;
- Ermelino Matarazzo;
- Freguesia/Brasilândia;
- Guaianases;
- Ipiranga;
- Itaim Paulista;
- Itaquera;
- Jabaquara;
- Jaçanã/Tremembé;
- Lapa;
- Mboi Mirim;
- Mooca;
- Parelheiros;
- Penha;
- Perus;
- Pinheiros;
- Pirituba/Jaraguá;
- Santana/Tucuruvi;
- Santo Amaro;
- São Mateus;
- São Miguel Paulista;
- Sapopemba;
- Sé;
- Vila Maria/Vila Guilherme;
- Vila Mariana;
- Vila Prudente.

== Legislative ==
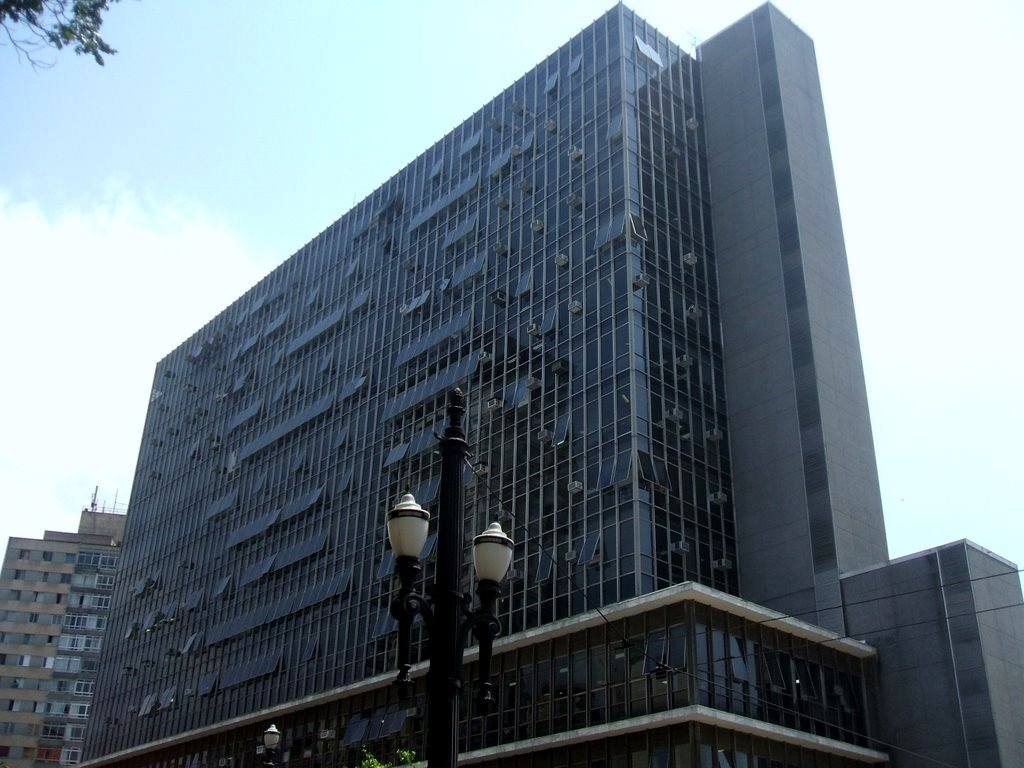
Anchieta Palace.

The legislature is unicameral and exercised by the Municipal Chamber of São Paulo, formed by 55 councillors elected to four-year terms and based at the Anchieta Palace. It prepares the municipal laws, supervises the work of the executive and suggests actions to benefit the population.

== See also ==
- List of mayors of São Paulo
- Politics of Brazil
