= Aricanduva =

Aricanduva may refer to:

- Subprefecture of Aricanduva, São Paulo
- Aricanduva (district of São Paulo)
- Aricanduva, Minas Gerais
- Aricanduva River
