= Cidade Tiradentes =

Cidade Tiradentes may refer to:

- Subprefecture of Cidade Tiradentes, São Paulo
- Cidade Tiradentes (district of São Paulo)
