= Vila Carrão =

Coordinates: 23°33′07″S 46°32′07″W

Vila Carrão (Portuguese pronunciation: [ˈvila kaˈʁɐ̃w]) is the historical name of a small residential neighborhood in São Paulo, with 75,000 residents as of 2005. It belongs to the Carrão district and to the Aricanduva sub-prefecture.

Vila Carrão is located about 13 km east of the city's center, on the west side of the Aricanduva River. It was officially established in 1917, and is named after Councillor Carrão, a prominent public figure who owned the area at the end of the 19th century.

== History ==
=== Chácara Carrão ===
The earliest records about the place, from 1570, locate it along a trail used by hinterland explorers (bandeirantes). One of the first permanent residents was in fact the explorer Francisco Velho, who settled along the Aricanduva, on land belonging to Brás Cubas. In 1642, his grandson Capt. Francisco Velho Moraes acquired the land's rights.

Data over the next 200 years is lacking, but in 1851 there is a record of Bento Fernandes de Souza selling the property, then called Sítio Tucuri, to Englishman George Harley, who renamed it Bom Retiro ("Nice Retreat") and built a house near the Tucuri Brook, later renamed Córrego Rapadura. In 1865 the area was bought by João José da Silva Carrão, former governor of the provinces of São Paulo and Pará, senator, and minister of the Empire.

The new owner made the land into large chácara (farm), Chácara Carrão. At its height, the farm had more than 15,000 grape vines, as well as fig, pear, and peach trees, and produced a renowned wine — which merited a visit by Emperor Pedro II in 1876.

At the Councillor's death in 1888, the property was sold to Carlos Teixeira de Carvalho, Francisco de Almeida Nobre, and Liberto A. de Macedo and Cristalino Luiz da Silva (1890). In 1907 the part belonging to Francisco de Almeida was bought by Ranulpho de Campos Salles, who donated it to his sisters Doralisa and Evangelina Dantre Salles.

=== Development ===
Around the turn of the 20th century, immigrant workers from Portugal, Italy, Spain, and later from Japan came to the area to work at the farm and at a wool mill, the Lanifícios Minerva S/A, built there in 1906 by Belgian entrepreneurs Paschoal Boronheid and Fernand Delcroix.

By that time the farm was being administered by dentist, João Gomes Barreto, who in 1916 hired engineer Henrique Pegado to turn it into a residential town. The current street plan, largely based on a regular grid with 100 m by 100 m blocks, stands to this day, and most streets are still named after the land owners (Rua Evangelina, Rua Doralisa), the administrator (Rua Dentista Barreto), the engineer (Rua Engenheiro Pegado) and their relatives and friends. One street, Rua Francisca de Paula, was named after a former slave of Carrão. The preexisting access road, formerly known as the Itaquera Road, became the present Avenida Conselheiro Carrão, that cuts irregularly across the east edge of the street grid. The residential lots were put up for sale in 1917, which is reckoned as Vila Carrão's official foundation date.

Still, in the 1920s there were only 10–20 houses, and most of the borough was occupied by small family farms. The first primary school (Grupo Escolar Vila Carrão) opened in 1924, and the Postal Office in 1929.

In 1932 Vila Carrão was brushed by the Constitutionalist Revolt. Residents of the time tell of rifle and artillery fire in the streets, and houses being looted by soldiers.

=== Growth and integration ===
The borough's development had a substantial jump in the 1930s, when industrialist Guilherme Giorgi (himself an immigrant from Italy) built there a large cotton mill, the Cotonifício Guilherme Giorgi, which would be for many decades the mainstay of the borough's economy, and would come to employ 2800 workers. In the following decades three other boroughs would spring up west and south of Vila Carrão, within the former Carrão estate: Vila Nova Manchester, Vila Santa Isabel, and Jardim Textil, the latter deriving from house blocks built in the 1980s by the mill for its workers.

Between the 1950s and the 1960s, Vila Carrão became integrated into the São Paulo urban area; most of its streets got paved at that time, and house wells and septic tanks were replaced by the city's water and sewer networks. At the time, the borough's social life revolved around the local sports and social club (Clube Atlético Carrão, est. 1928), the Vila's only cinema (Cine Carrão), and of course the local church.

=== The Church ===
Built as a small chapel dedicated to Saint Marina Virgin in 1924, with donations by the Giorgi family and other local residents, the local church got its first permanent priest (F. Thiago Franz) in 1936, and was promoted to a parish church (igreja matriz) in 1946. In 1956 it passed to a new priest, F. Eugenio Herter, who began the construction of a much larger temple — to be built around the existing chapel, so that services could continue during construction. F. Herter died when the new church was still half-built, and the project was finished by his successor F. Orídes Giroldo in the 1960s.

=== Vila Carrão today ===
In the ensuing decades, Vila Carrão could not escape from the economic and social problems of the big city that engulfed it. It has long lost the quiet suburban atmosphere still remembered by its older residents, who until the 1960s and 1970s would put out chairs on the sidewalk, every evening, and spend some time chatting with their neighbours while their children played in the streets. Today, as in most parts of the city, houses are walled up, windows are behind bars, and the streets are no longer suitable for play or chat.

Still, many residents remain fond and even proud of the borough. They still frequent the Clube Atético to play soccer or bocce. The metro station at Avenida Conselheiro Carrão, opened in 1986, greatly improved access to the rest of the city (compensating for the increased congestion of São Paulo streets) and did much to valorize the neighborhood. Many of the former single-story houses have now been replaced by middle class apartment buildings.

There are about 800 families of descendants of Japanese immigrants, served by two Japanese cultural clubs (Associação Okinawa and Associação Cultural Recreativa e Esportiva do Carrão). There is also a Soccer School, established in land formerly belonging to Cotonificio, currently with 400 students.

In 1990, Vila Carrão was joined with other nearby boroughs (Carrãozinho, Chacara Santo Antônio, Chacara Califórnia, Vila Nova Manchester, Vila Santa Isabel, and Vila São Vicente) into the administrative district of Carrão.

== Curiosities ==
One of the most famous natives of Vila Carrão was soccer athlete Aurélio Lombardi, who played for the Ipiranga, Santos, and Portuguesa teams in the 1930s and 1940s.

Vila Carrão and the neighboring borough of Vila Formosa share the Vila Formosa Cemetery (est. 1949). It is believed to be the largest cemetery in Latin America, with 780,000 m^{2} and more than 1,400,000 "permanent residents".
