= Guaianases =

Guaianases may refer to:

- Subprefecture of Guaianases, São Paulo
- Guaianases (district of São Paulo)
- Guaianases station, São Paulo's Line 11 (CPTM)
