= Carrao =

Carrao or Carrão may refer to:

- Carrão (district of São Paulo), an administrative district of São Paulo, Brazil
  - Carrão (São Paulo Metro), a railway station in the district
  - Vila Carrão, a historic borough in the district
- Carrao River, a river of Venezuela
- Limpkin or carrao, a species of bird

== People with the surname ==
- Humberto Carrão (born 1991), Brazilian actor

== See also ==
- Carrao-tepui, a table-top mountain or mesa in Venezuela
- José Bracho or Carrao Bracho (1928–2011), Venezuelan baseball player
- El Carrao de Palmarito (1928–2002), Venezuelan singer
