= East Zone =

East Zone may refer to:

== Places ==
- East Zone 1 of São Paulo, an Administrative Zone of São Paulo, Brazil
- East Zone 2 of São Paulo, an Administrative Zone of São Paulo, Brazil

== Organizations and companies ==
- East Zone cricket team, a first-class cricket team that represents East India
- East Zone women's cricket team, a women's cricket team that represents East India
- East Zone cricket team (Bangladesh), a first class cricket team in East Bangladesh
- East Zone (Bangladesh Railway), a railway zone operated by Bangladesh Railway
