= Centro Comercial Aricanduva =

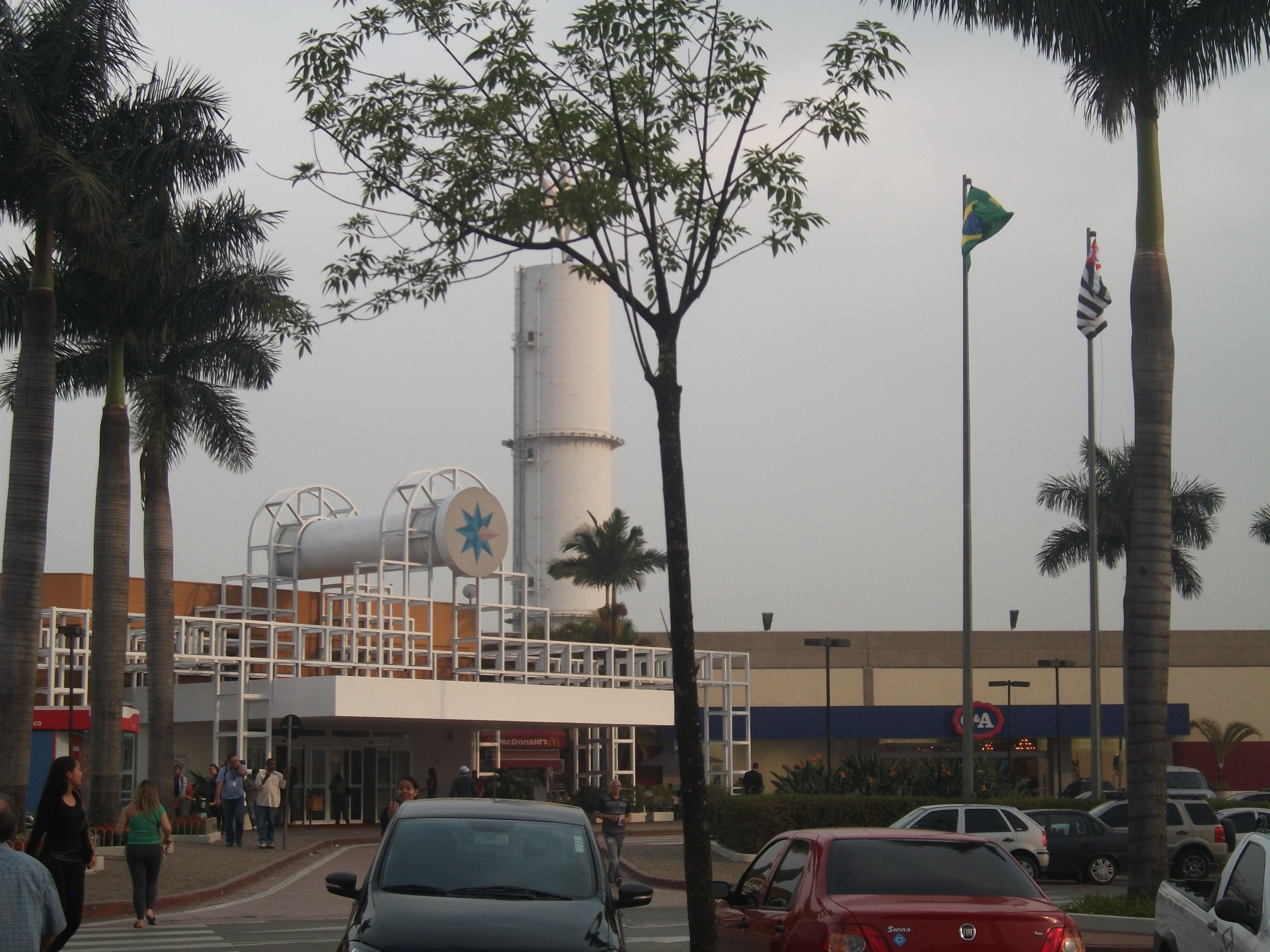
- Main entrance to the mall
- Location: São Paulo, Brazil
- Coordinates: 23.5661°S 46.5042°W
- Opened: September 19, 1991; 35 years ago
- Manager: Savoy
- Owner: Centerleste Empreendimentos Comerciais Ltda
- Num. of stores: 545+
- Num. of anchor tenants: 35
- Floor area: 257,047 m^{2} (2,766,830 sq ft)
- Floors: 3
- Parking: 14,700 spaces
- Website: aricanduva.com.br

Centro Comercial Aricanduva (English: Aricanduva Shopping Center), also known as Shopping Aricanduva (English: Aricanduva Mall), is a shopping mall located in the Aricanduva Avenue, district of Cidade Líder, São Paulo. Its slogan is "Gigante como São Paulo", which means "Gigantic like São Paulo."

The mall has 440,000 m^{2} (4,700,000 sq ft) of built area, (making it the biggest in the Southern Hemisphere) out of which 257,047 m^{2} (2,766,830 sq ft) is leasable space, making it the third largest shopping mall in Latin America in terms of gross leasable area behind the Albrook Mall in Panama, and Antea LifeStyle Center in Mexico, and one of the largest in the world. It has over 545 shops, 14 cinemas and 14,700 parking spaces.

The mall is a complex that consists of Shopping Leste Aricanduva, Interlar Aricanduva (home decoration and construction stores) and Auto Shopping Aricanduva (automotive stores). More than 4.5 million people visit the mall every month.

== Stores ==
There is a supermarket in the mall (Assaí Atacadista), two building materials stores (C&C and Dicico), fourteen cinemas, an amusement park (Playcenter Family), three food courts, and thirteen car dealerships.
