= Carrão (district of São Paulo) =

District of São Paulo, Brazil

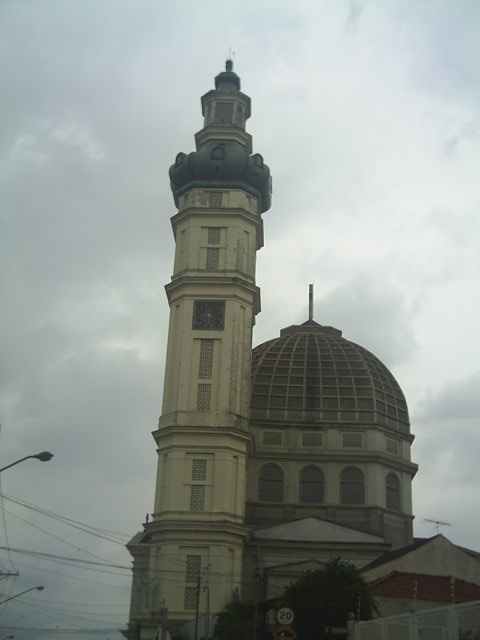
- Country: Brazil
- State: São Paulo
- City: São Paulo

Government
  - Type: Subprefecture
  - Subprefect: Jorge Augusto Leme

Area
  - Total: 7.5 km^{2} (2.9 sq mi)

Population (2000)
  - Total: 78.175
  - Density: 10.423/km^{2} (27.00/sq mi)
- HDI: 0.886 –high
- Website: Subprefecture of Aricanduva

Carrão (Portuguese pronunciation: [kaˈʁɐ̃w]) is an administrative district of the São Paulo, with 75,000 residents as of 2005. It belongs to the Aricanduva sub-prefecture.

Carrão is located about 13 km east of the city's center. It is named after João José da Silva Carrão, a prominent public figure who owned most of the district's area at the end of the 19th century.

== History ==
=== Colonial period ===
In the 16th century, the area of the present district was crossed by the trail connecting the Indian villages of Piratininga and Biacica or Imbiacica (now Itaim Paulista, Vila Curuçá and part of Jardim Helena). That trail was also used by the early colonial explorers (bandeirantes). Some historians claim that the lands were part of the domain (sesmaria) granted by the Portuguese Crown to João Ramalho. One of the first permanent residents was in fact the explorer Francisco Velho, who settled along the Aricanduva, on land belonging to Brás Cubas.

=== Imperial period ===
Over the following centuries the region became occupied by large farms. The most famous was a property formerly called Tucuri or Bom Retiro, which was acquired in 1865 by Councillor Carrão and then became known as Chácara Carrão.

Around the turn of the 20th century, immigrant workers from Portugal, Italy, Spain, and later from Japan came to the area to work at Carrão's farm and at a wool mill, the Lanifícios Minerva S/A, built there in 1906 by Belgian entrepreneurs Paschoal Boronheid and Fernand Delcroix.. An urbanized borough, Vila Carrão, was established in 1917. Another major factor in the area's development was the installation in the 1930s of a large cotton mill, the Cotonifício Guilherme Giorgi, which at its height employed 2800 workers. The remaining lands of Chácara carrão were urbanized and became the boroughs of Vila Nova Manchester (1922), Vila Santa Isabel (1931), and Jardim Têxtil.

=== Promotion to district ===
By the 1950s the area which is now the Carrão district was almost entirely urbanized and integrated with the São Paulo urban area.

The Carrão district was created in 1991 by an act of then mayor Luiza Erundina. Until then, the land was part of the Tatuapé district. It comprises the following neighborhoods: Carrãozinho, Chácara Santo Antonio, Chácara Califórnia, Vila Carrão, Vila Nova Manchester, Vila Santa Isabel, and Vila São Vicente.

The new district boundaries deviated somewhat from the historical borough boundaries. In particular, the Carrão metro station, until then part of the Vila Carrão borough, is now in the Tatupé district.

== Current affairs ==
The Carrão neighborhood is widely recognized for hosting a significant Japanese-Brazilian community, predominantly descendants from the Okinawa province. The Okinawa Vila Carrão Association, founded in 1957, had 3,000 members by 2011. One of the main events organized by the community is the Okinawa Festival, held annually at the Vila Manchester School Club, and is now considered one of the largest Japanese colony events in São Paulo, being part of the city's official calendar.

In recent years, Carrão has undergone an intense process of real estate expansion, marked by the emergence of new high-end residential buildings as well as prominent commercial ventures. This rapid urbanization has worsened traffic in the region. A 2012 survey indicated that Avenida Conselheiro Carrão, the neighborhood’s main commercial thoroughfare, was one of the ten most congested streets in the city, with a higher traffic slowdown rate than Avenida Rebouças, an important link between downtown and the western zone of São Paulo.

The arrival of the subway may ease traffic in the area. The extension of São Paulo’s Metro Line 2 plans to build two stations in Carrão: Guilherme Giorgi and Nova Manchester, along with other stops in neighboring districts.

According to data collected by the 2010 Census, Carrão stands out as the most representatively "Paulista" region within the city of São Paulo.

== Curiosities ==
Carrão and the neighboring district of Vila Formosa share the Vila Formosa Cemetery (est. 1949). It is believed to be the largest cemetery in Latin America, with 780,000 m^{2} and more than 1,400,000 "permanent residents".

== See also ==
- Roman Catholic Archdiocese of São Paulo
