= Lajeado (district of São Paulo) =

District of São Paulo, Brazil

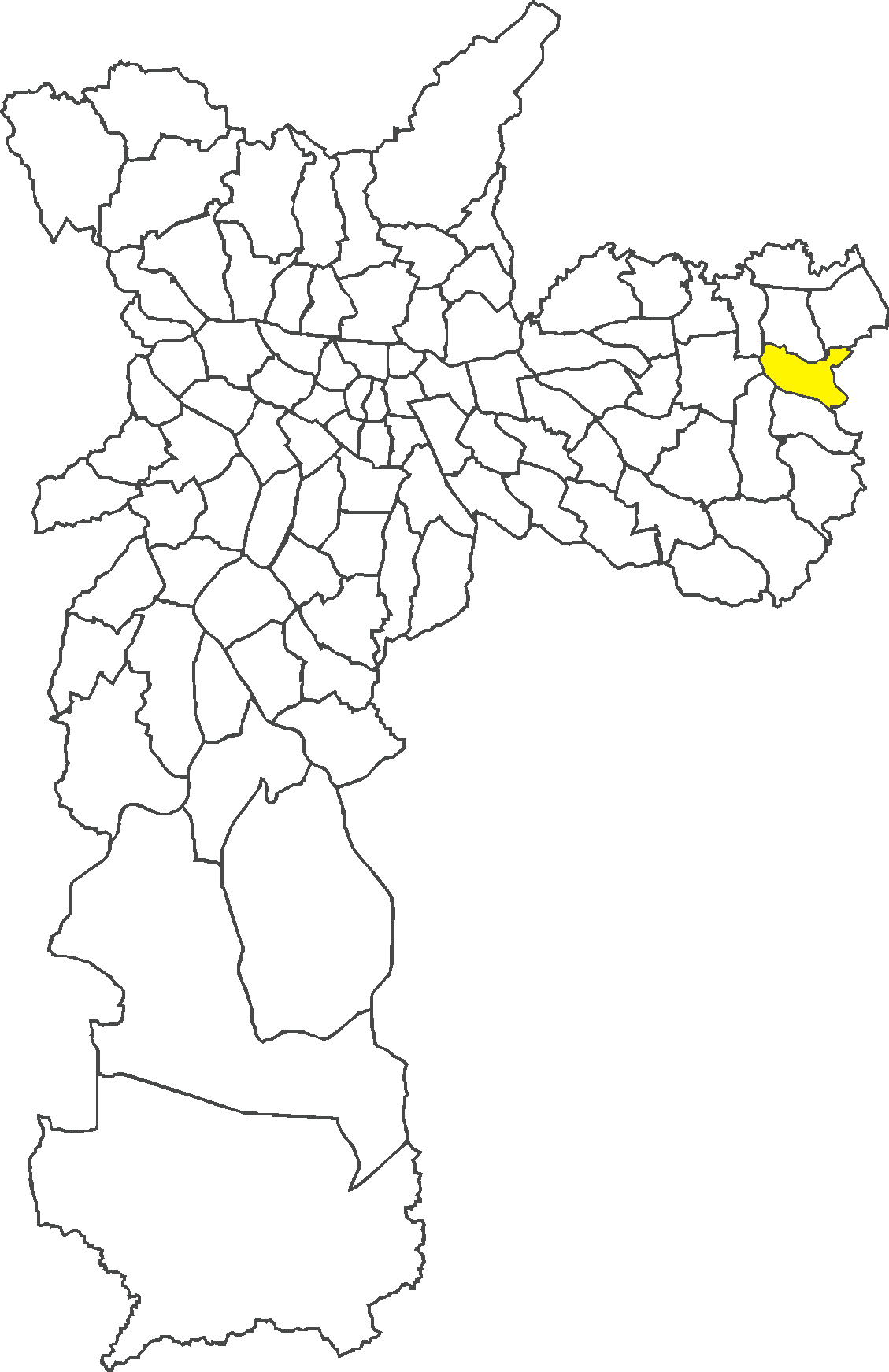
- Location of Lajeado in São Paulo

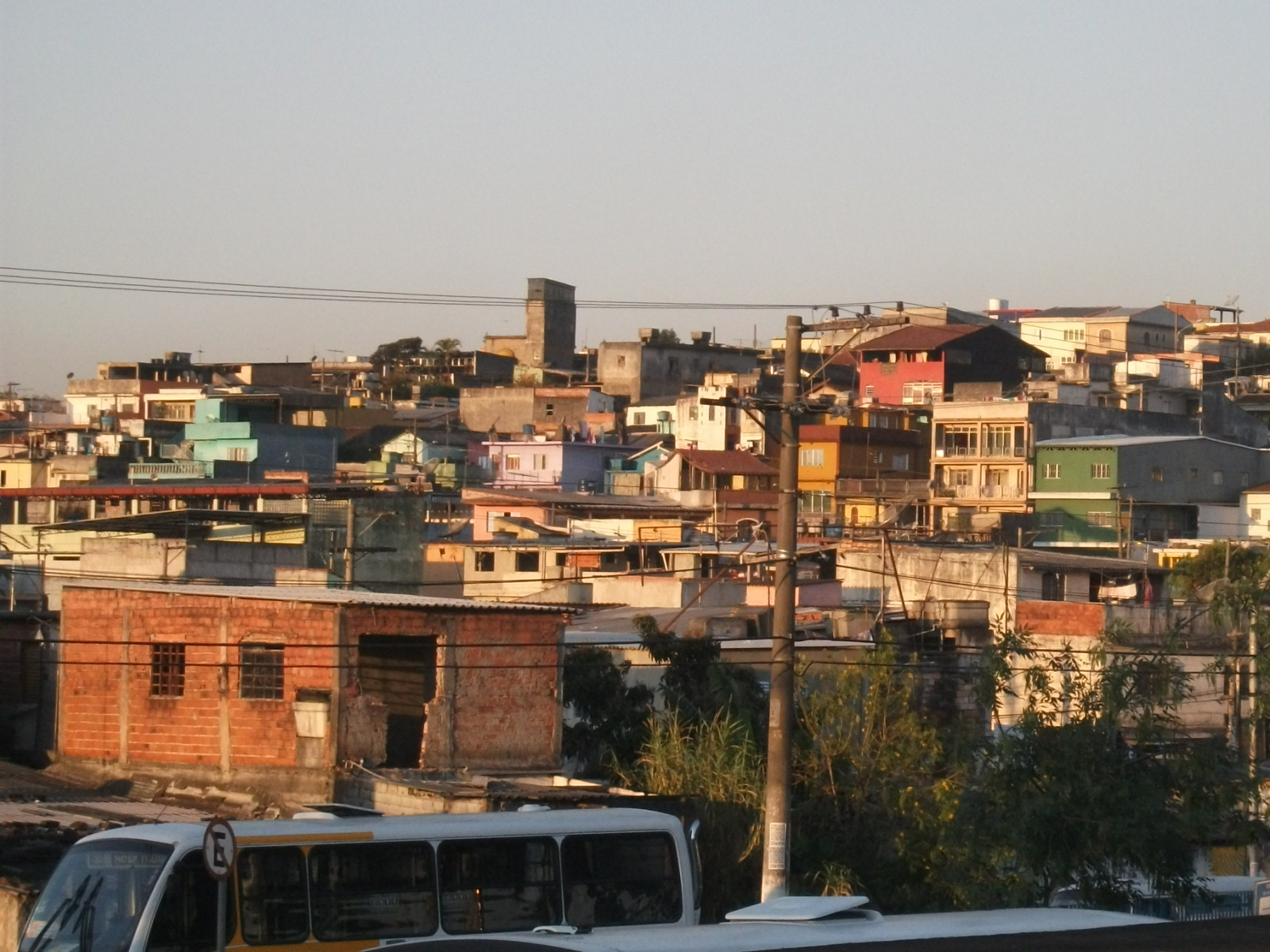
- Country: Brazil
- State: São Paulo
- City: São Paulo

Government
  - Type: Subprefecture
  - Subprefect: Saint Clair Coutinho

Population (2000)
  - Total: 157,773
- HDI: 0.748 - medium
- Website: Subprefecture of Lajeado

Lajeado is a district in the subprefecture of Guaianases of the city of São Paulo.
