= Subprefecture of Itaim Paulista =

Coordinates: 23°30′17″S 46°23′11″W

- Subprefecture
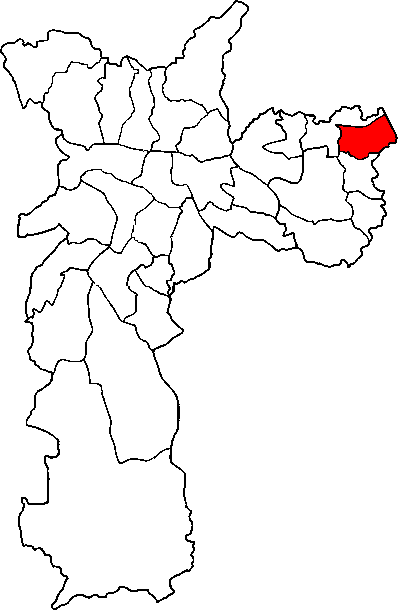
- Location of the Subprefecture of Itaim Paulista in São Paulo

- Location of municipality of São Paulo within the State of São Paulo
- Country: Brazil
- Region: Southeast
- State: São Paulo
- Municipality: São Paulo
- Administrative Zone: East 2
- Districts: Itaim Paulista, Vila Curuçá

Government
  - Type: Subprefecture
  - Subprefect: Irene Mitsue Inada

Area
  - Total: 21.72 km^{2} (8.39 sq mi)

Population (2008)
  - Total: 399,140
- Website: Subprefeitura Itaim Paulista (Portuguese)

The Subprefecture of Itaim Paulista is one of 32 subprefectures of the city of São Paulo, Brazil. It comprises two districts: Itaim Paulista and Vila Curuçá.

Itaim Paulista is the easternmost subprefecture in São Paulo. Its population consists largely of migrants from the north-east of Brazil, in particular from the states of Bahia and Pernambuco. Earlier immigrants came from Italy, Japan and Hungary.
