= Itaquaquecetuba (CPTM) =

Railway station in São Paulo, Brazil

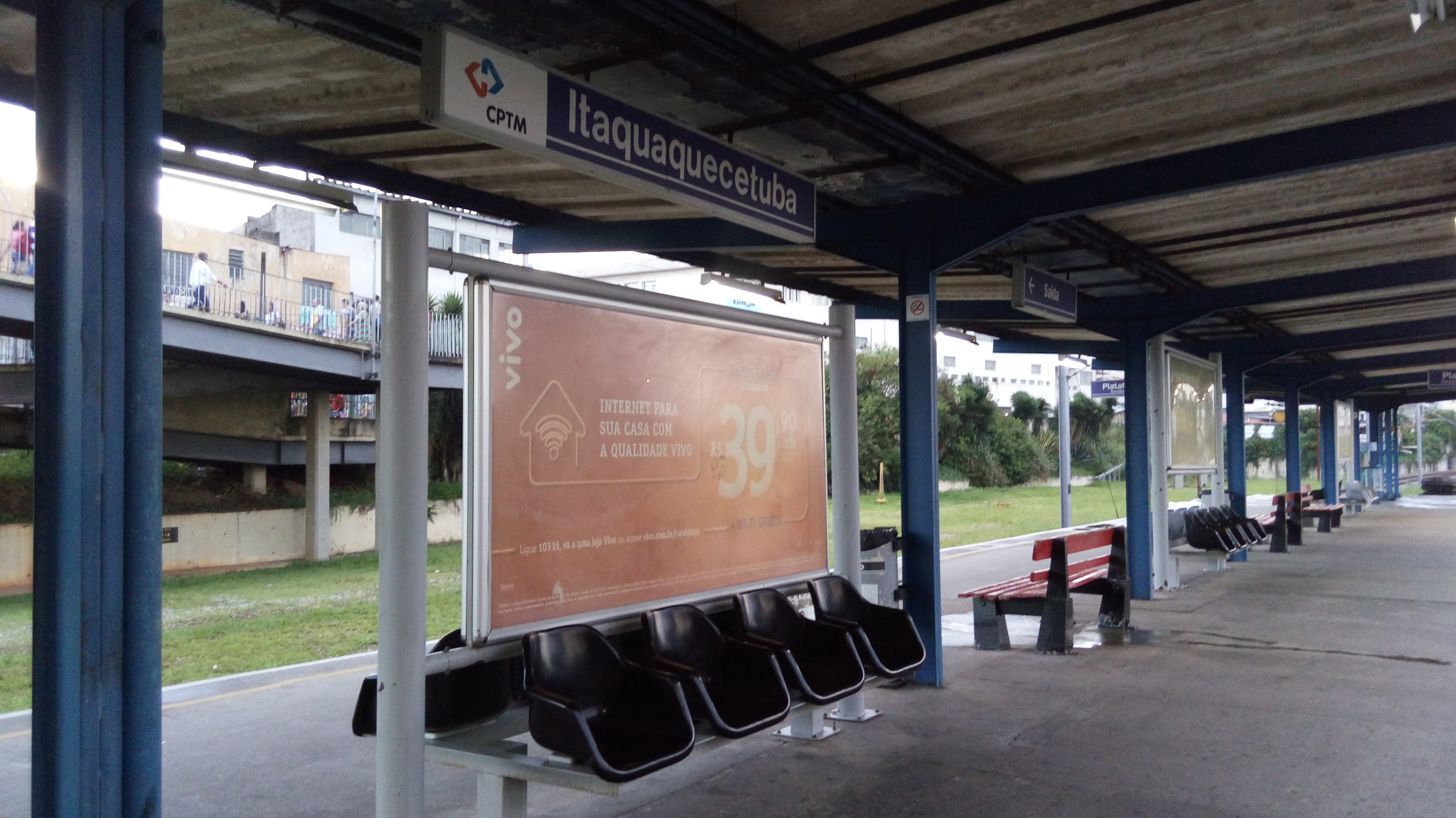

General information
- Location: Av. Pres. Tancredo Neves, 746; Estação; Brazil
- Coordinates: 23.485703°S 46.348518°W
- Owner: Government of the State of São Paulo
- Operator: CPTM
- Platforms: Island platform

Construction
- Structure type: At-grade

Other information
- Station code: IQC

History
- Opened: 7 February 1926

Services
Preceding station	São Paulo Metropolitan Trains	Following station
Engenheiro Manoel Feio towards Brás	Line 12	Aracaré towards Calmon Viana
Track layout
Location

Itaquaquecetuba is a train station on CPTM Line 12-Sapphire, located in the city of Itaquaquecetuba, in the state of São Paulo.

== History ==
The station was built by EFCB on 7 February 1926, along with Variante de Poá, which was opened only on 1 January 1934. In the end of the 1970s, it received a new building built by RFFSA. Since 1 June 1994, it's operated by CPTM.
