= Engenheiro Manoel Feio (CPTM) =

Railway station in São Paulo, Brazil

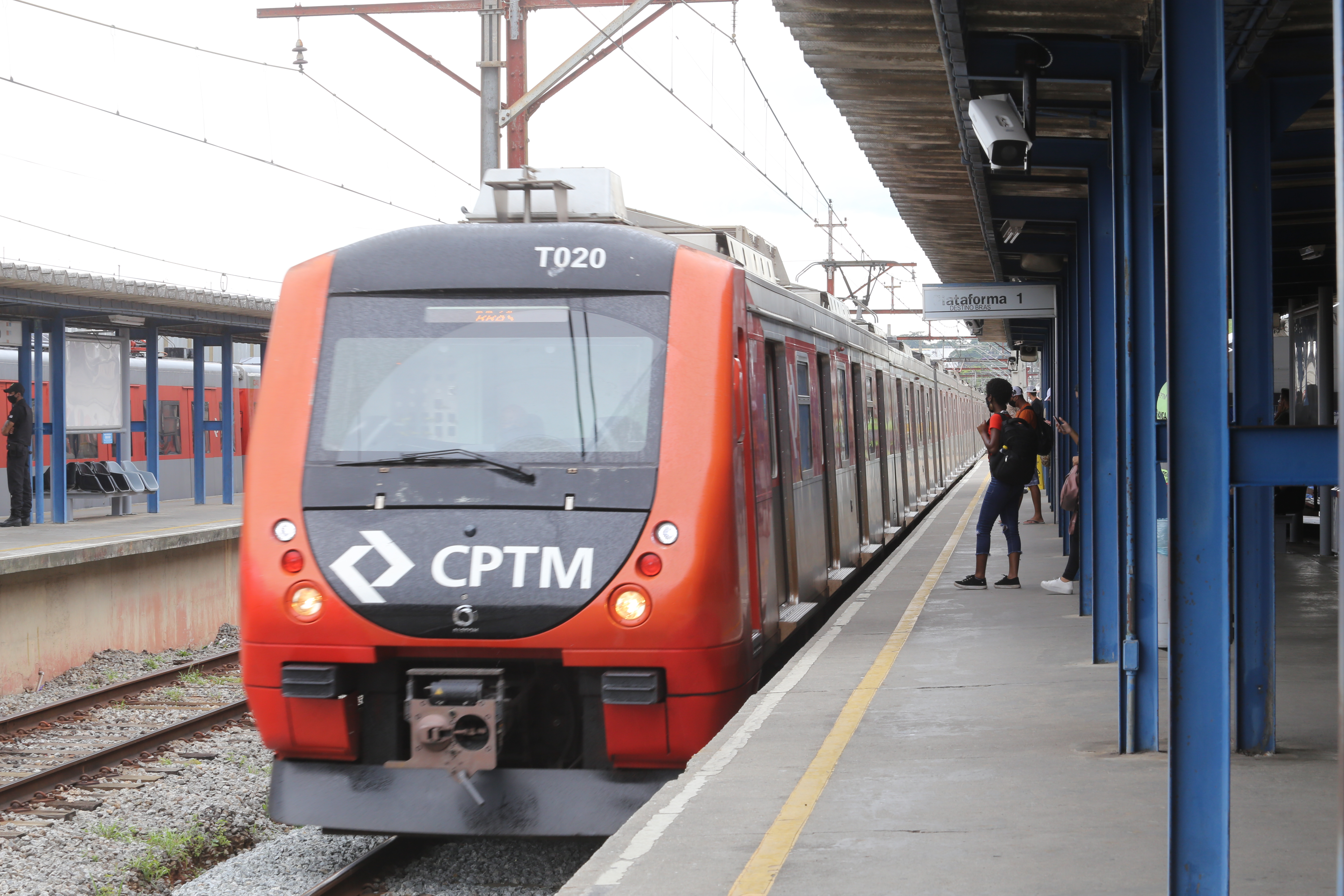
- Platform of the station

General information
- Location: Av. Eldorado; Engenheiro Manoel Feio; Brazil
- Coordinates: 23.479509°S 46.368114°W
- Owner: Government of the State of São Paulo
- Operator: CPTM
- Platforms: Side platforms
- Connections: Manoel Feio Bus Terminal

Construction
- Structure type: At-grade

Other information
- Station code: EMF

History
- Opened: 7 February 1926; 1 January 1934 (reopening)
- Closed: 6 May 1930

Services
Preceding station	São Paulo Metropolitan Trains	Following station
Jardim Romano towards Brás	Line 12	Itaquaquecetuba towards Calmon Viana
Track layout
Location

Engenheiro Manoel Feio is a train station on CPTM Line 12-Sapphire, located in the city of Itaquaquecetuba, in the state of São Paulo. In the future, it can be a terminus for the São Paulo Metropolitan Rail Ring.

== History ==
The station was built by EFCB between 1921 and 1926 and opened 7 February 1926, named after the EFCB engineer Manoel Feio. After a short period of operation, in which occurred a derailment on 6 May 1930, causing the death of 4 people and wounding 20, the station and Variante de Poá were closed and reopened only on 1 January 1934.

In 1979, it received a new building built by RFFSA, in the scope of construction of Variante do Parateí (branch between Engenheiro Manoel Feio and São José dos Campos), reformed in 1986. It is operated by CPTM since 1994. The precariousness of services, along with the feeling of unsafety in the region caused the occurrence of vandalism in the station during the 1980s and 1990s and a heist to its ticket offices with 26 hostages on 19 May 2000.

=== Projects ===
There are two projects for its rebuilt. In 2005, CPTM hired Una Arquitetos to make the project for a new edification and, in 2012, the JBMC office was hired to make a new project. Besides the projects are concluded, there is no prediction for the start of the construction.

Recently, a group of local residents pleaded in the Legislative Assembly, through State Deputy Carlos Cezar (PSB), without success, a suggestion for the renaming of the station to Presidente Juscelino Kubitschek. The reason would be that the current name is considered pejorative for some residents, though it was done in 1926. After an article published in the 22nd Week of Metroviary Technology of the Metro Engineers and Architects Association (AEAMESP), the cost for an intermediary station renaming is almost 620,000 BRL (177,584.28 USD), a reason why CPTM avoids the renaming of station, except when obligated by law.

After the Information Requirement no. 254/2019, made by State Deputy Mônica Seixas (PSOL), CPTM published a schedule of investments predicted and done for the making of the reconstruction of the station.
