= Aracaré (CPTM) =

Railway station in São Paulo, Brazil

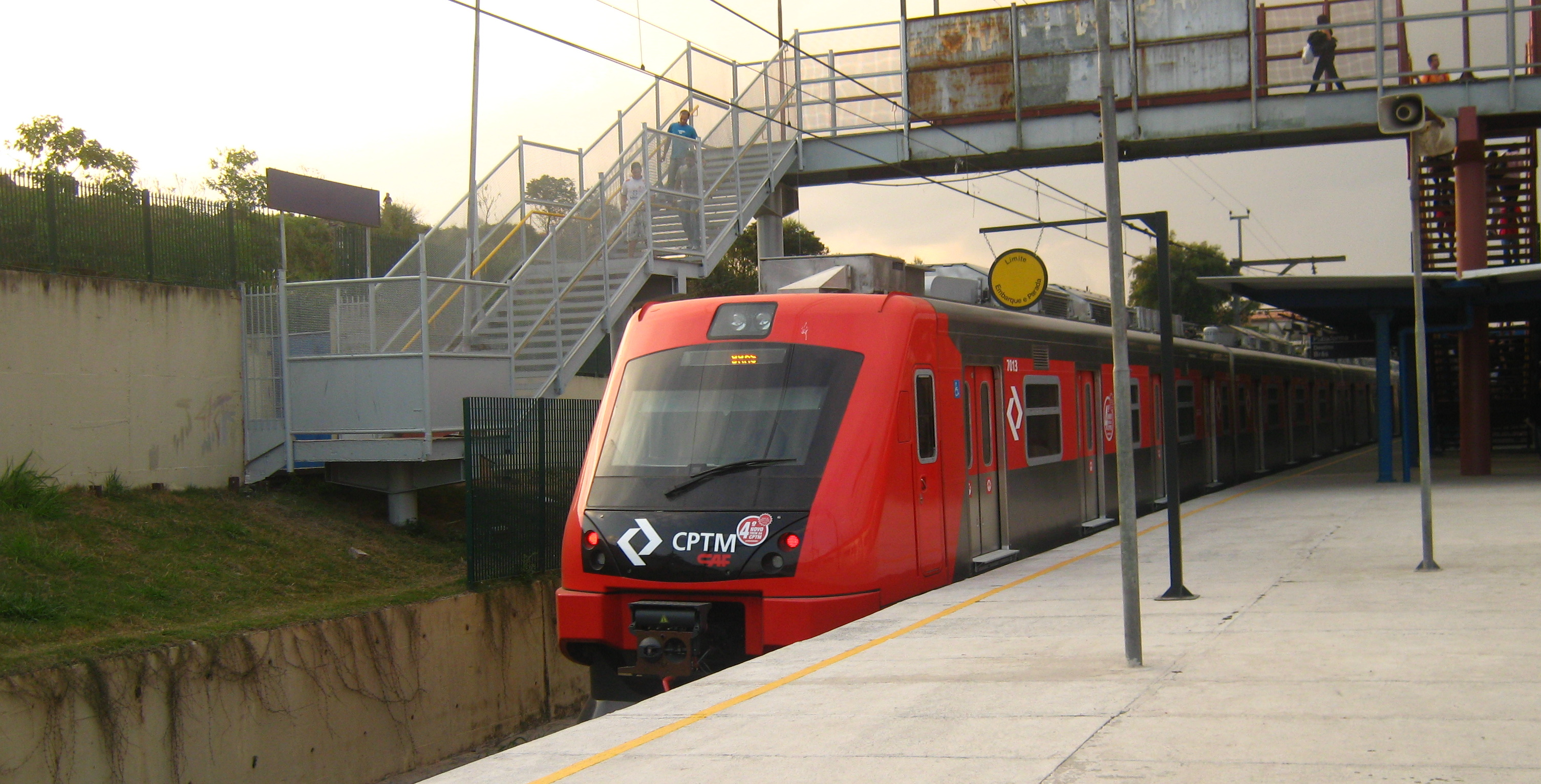
- Train stopped at the station

General information
- Location: R. Rio de Janeiro; Aracaré; Brazil
- Coordinates: 23.499661°S 46.339034°W
- Owner: Government of the State of São Paulo
- Operator: CPTM
- Platforms: Island platform

Construction
- Structure type: Surface

Other information
- Station code: ARC

History
- Opened: 20 August 1950

Services
Preceding station	São Paulo Metropolitan Trains	Following station
Itaquaquecetuba towards Brás	Line 12	Calmon Viana Terminus
Track layout
Location

Aracaré is a train station on CPTM Line 12-Sapphire, located of the city of Itaquaquecetuba.

== History ==
With the implementation of Variante de Poá in 1926, many industries installed in the Aracaré region like Rendal - Indústrias de Renda Ltda and Lanifício Ítamo Adami S/A. This way, a halt named Aracaré was built in the 1940s to attend the factories' workers.

On 20 August 1950, the new halt was promoted to station by Estrada de Ferro Central do Brasil, receiving new installations and kept the name Aracaré. With the opening of the new station, imobiliary companies launched projects Vila Ercília and Vila Aracaré, changing the region's profile from few industries to populated residential boroughs. Yet, the movement of the station was low, with an average of 900 passengers boarding daily in the station in 1975.

After being transferred from RFFSA to CBTU in 1984, Aracaré station went to reform to expand its platform in the following year, so it can allow the operation of trains with 9 to 12 cars. Besides the platform expansion, the cover of the same was not executed. On 1 June 1984, the station was transferred to CPTM. Because of the infrastructure and lack of accessibility, the station became target of many complaints from commuters. Another problem was the gap between the train and the platform. With 46 centimetres (18 in), above the 10 centimetres (3.9 in) limited by ABNT-NBR 14021, Aracaré has the largest gap in the CPTM. Besides the promises of reform or modernization, no work was done until then.

=== Projects ===
On 12 April 2005, CPTM opened the bidding no. 8292402011, predicting project of modernization/rebuilt of 39 station divided in 10 allotments. Aracaré station was included in allotment 9, along with stations Engenheiro Goulart, São Miguel Paulista, Itaquaquecetuba and Engenheiro Manoel Feio. Allotment 9 was won by consortium Vetec/Trends by the cost of 777,177 BRL (464,588.5 USD). The consortium hired the Una Arquitetos office. The proposal of reconstruction predicted the displacement of the station to 900 metres (3,000 ft) south of the current location, making the station going from Itaquaquecetuba to Poá.

Located originally next to the Environmental Preservation Area, but in the south side of the railway, its displacement aims to attend the demand of the area of denser occupation area. Its new location will be next to Rua Foz do Iguaçu, access way to Avenida Vital Brasil, point of connection with bus, and next to Rua Calil Haddad, north to the track.

— Part of the study for new Aracaré station, made by Una Arquitetos

The proposal of changing of localization of the station was contested by the population and Itaquaquecetuba politicians, being archived.

Later, a new project for modernization of the station was hired along with GPO Sistran, but no work was made until then.

After the Information Requirement no. 254/2019, made by State Deputy Mônica Seixas (PSOL), CPTM published a schedule of investments predicted and done for the making of the reconstruction of the station.
