= Jardim Romano (CPTM) =

Railway station in São Paulo, Brazil

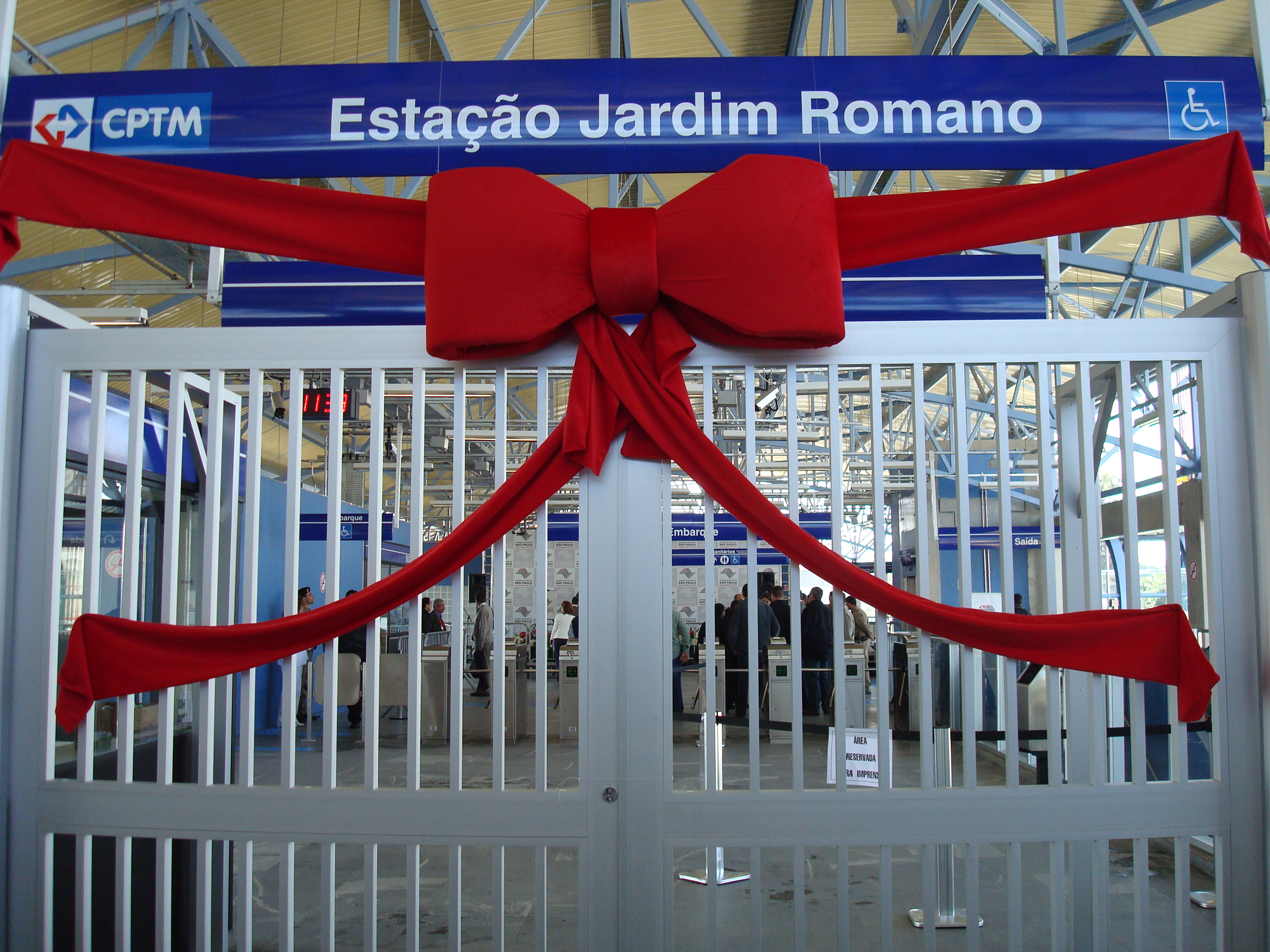
- Lace in the station put for the opening day

General information
- Location: R. José Álvares Moreira, 349; Itaim Paulista; Brazil
- Coordinates: 23.4849259°S 46.3855487°W
- Owner: Government of the State of São Paulo
- Operator: CPTM
- Platforms: Island platform

Construction
- Structure type: At-grade

Other information
- Station code: JRO

History
- Opened: 16 July 2008

Services
Preceding station	São Paulo Metropolitan Trains	Following station
Itaim Paulista towards Brás	Line 12	Engenheiro Manoel Feio towards Calmon Viana
Track layout
Location

Jardim Romano is a train station on CPTM Line 12-Sapphire, located in the city of São Paulo.

== History ==
The first project for a station in Jardim Romando appeared in 1986, made by CBTU. However, by lack of funds, it didn't make it. For 20 years, there were popular mobilizations in favor of the construction of the station in the region, until it was done and delivered on 16 July 2008. The station was built and is operated by CPTM and attends to Jardim Romano, in the border between Itaim Paulista and Jardim Helena, in the East Side of São Paulo. The implantation of the station encouraged the construction of a shopping mall nearby it, in the place of the deactivate Texima S/A Machine Industry, which construction is ongoing.
