= Vila Curuçá =

District of São Paulo, Brazil

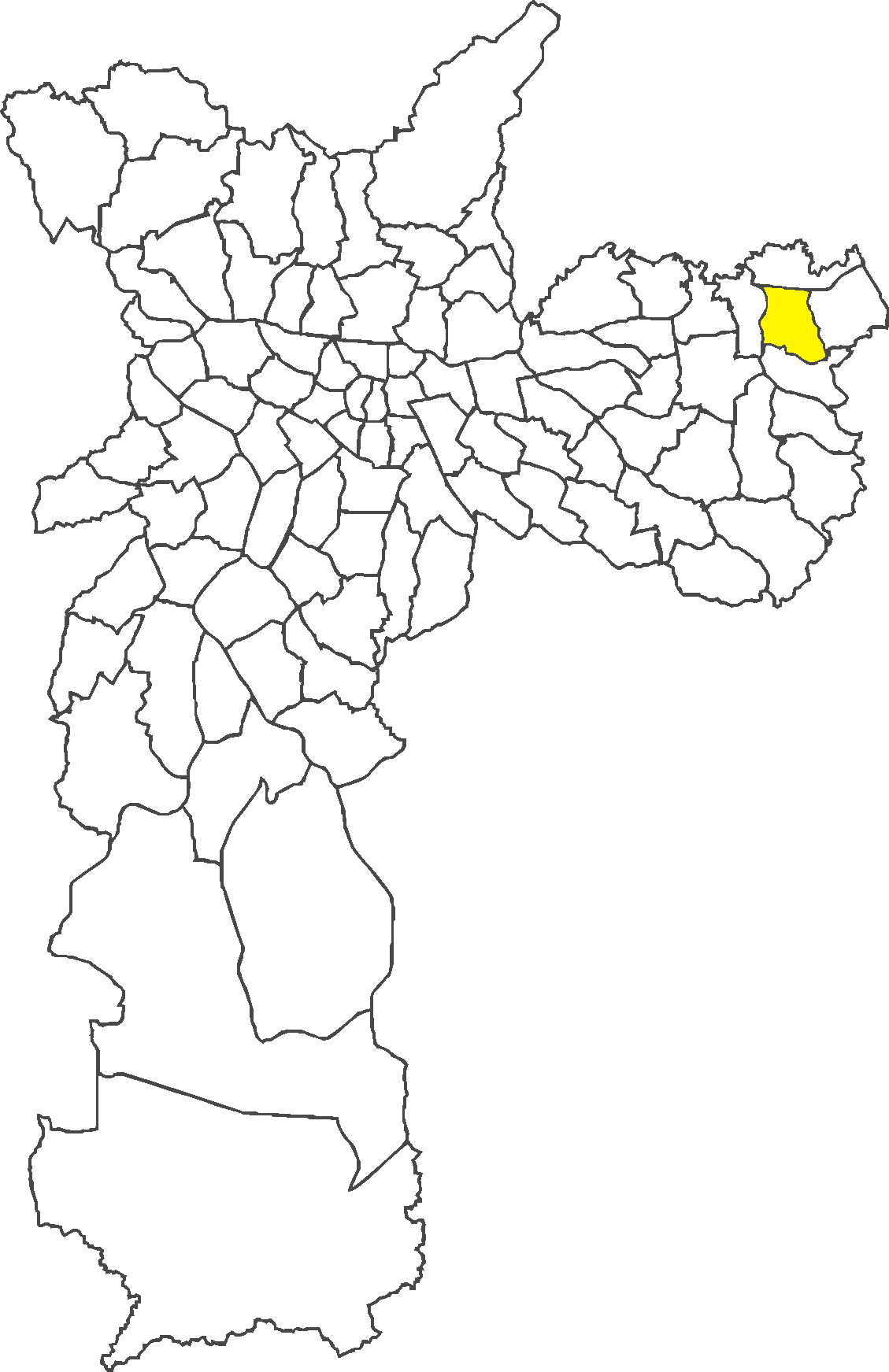
- Location in the city of São Paulo
- Country: Brazil
- State: São Paulo
- City: São Paulo

Government
  - Type: Subprefecture
  - Subprefect: João dos Santos de Souza

Area
  - Total: 9.7 km^{2} (3.7 sq mi)

Population (2007)
  - Total: 162,486
  - Density: 167.51/km^{2} (433.8/sq mi)
- HDI: 0.765
- Website: Subprefecture of Itaim Paulista/Vila Curuçá

Vila Curuçá is a municipal District located in the eastern section, Zona Leste, of the city and prefecture of São Paulo, Brazil. It is one of the two districts making up the subprefecture of Itaim Paulista. It has an area of 676 thousand km² and a population of 41.262.

== History ==
Vila Curuçá shares a common history with the district of Itaim Paulista and the eastern part of the district of Jardim Helena. The first Portuguese explorers arrived in the area in the early years of the 17th century. In 1610–11, the Bandeirante Domingos de Góes is recorded as having received a grant of land from the Portuguese crown in the "Boi Sentado" area, near the Tietê River. This land passed into the hands of the Carmelite priests in 1621. It was around this time that the chapel of Our Lady of Biacica was constructed (the name derives from the Tupi word "imbeicica", signifying a tough vine commonly found along the Tietê River). The chapel is regarded as a symbol of the area's first permanent settlement.

For a long time the now separate areas of Itaim Paulista and Vila Curuçá and the eastern part of Jardim Helena together formed a single administrative unit, Imbeicica. The administrative offices of the Subprefecture of Itaim Paulista are located in Vila Curuçá and Vila Curuçá is often thought of as simply a neighborhood of Itaim Paulista.

== Facilities ==
The "Vila Curuçá Centro Educacional Unificado, CEU" is an educational center which offers infant and primary education and also serves as a hub for the leisure activities of the local community. It also houses an internet access center.

Near to Clube da Cidade is a leisure and recreation center run by the Prefecture of São Paulo, which houses swimming pools, sports courts and other facilities for over 3000 users on summer weekends as well as organizing dances for the elderly population.

== New station ==
Vila Curuçá is served by the CPTM network's Jardim Helena - Vila Mara station, opened on 28 May 2008. It provides improved transport connections and has helped stimulate the local economy.
