= Subprefecture of Cidade Tiradentes =

Subprefecture in Southeast Brazil

Coordinates: 23°35′03″S 46°23′45″W

Cidade Tiradentes (District of São Paulo)
- Subprefecture
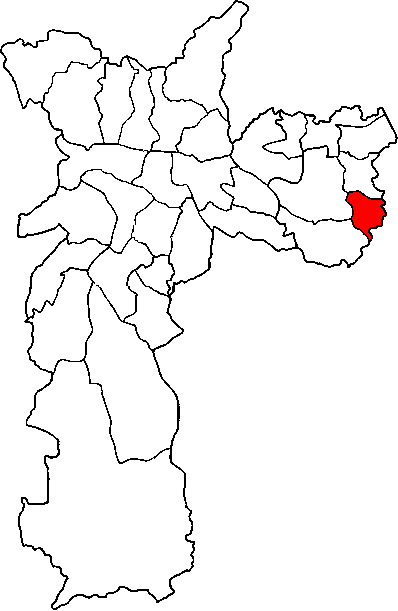
- Location of the Subprefecture of Cidade Tiradentes in São Paulo

- Location of municipality of São Paulo within the State of São Paulo
- Country: Brazil
- Region: Southeast
- State: São Paulo
- Municipality: São Paulo
- Administrative Zone: East 2
- Districts: Cidade Tiradentes

Government
  - Type: Subprefecture
  - Subprefect: Lucas Santos Sorillo

Area
  - Total: 15.12 km^{2} (5.84 sq mi)

Population (2008)
  - Total: 242,077
- Website: Subprefeitura Cidade Tiradentes (Portuguese)

The Subprefecture of Cidade Tiradentes is one of 32 subprefectures of the city of São Paulo, Brazil. It comprises one district: Cidade Tiradentes.
