= East Zone 2 of São Paulo =

Coordinates: 23°32′02″S 46°30′12″W

East Zone 2 of São Paulo Zona Leste 2
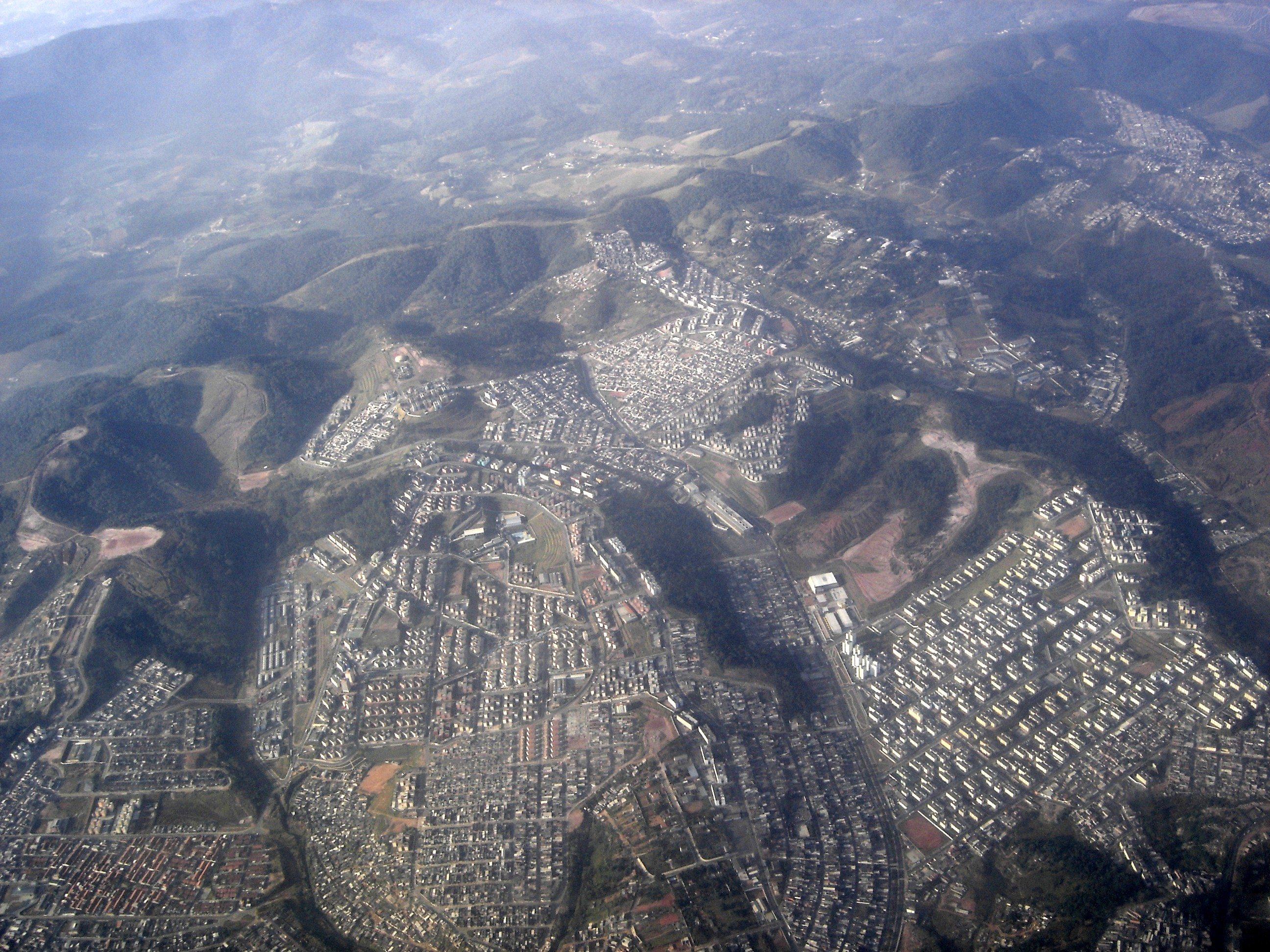

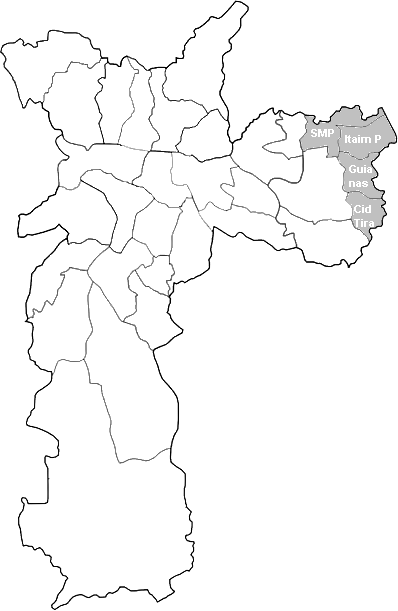
- Location of East Zone 2 of São Paulo
- Country: Brazil
- State: São Paulo
- City: São Paulo
- Subprefectures: East Zone 2: Itaim Paulista; Guaianases; São Miguel Paulista; Cidade Tiradentes

The East Zone 2 is an Administrative Zone of São Paulo, Brazil.
