= Subprefecture of Aricanduva =

Coordinates: 23°34′37″S 46°30′41″W

- Subprefecture
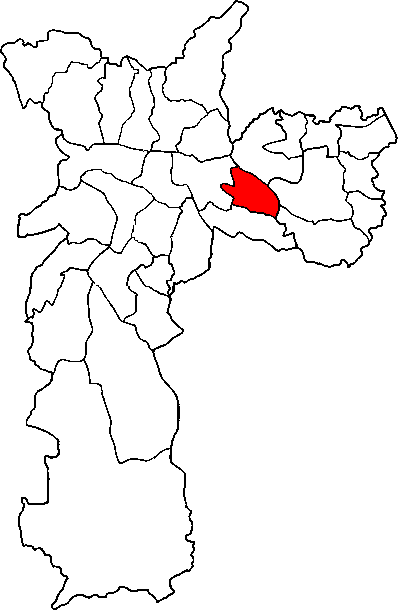
- Location of the Subprefecture of Aricanduva in São Paulo

- Location of municipality of São Paulo within the State of São Paulo
- Country: Brazil
- Region: Southeast
- State: São Paulo
- Municipality: São Paulo
- Administrative Zone: Southeast
- Districts: Aricanduva, Carrão, Vila Formosa

Government
  - Type: Subprefecture
  - Subprefect: Jorge Augusto Leme

Area
  - Total: 22.18 km^{2} (8.56 sq mi)

Population (2008)
  - Total: 258,203
- Website: Subprefeitura Aricanduva (Portuguese)

The Subprefecture of Aricanduva is one of 32 subprefectures of the city of São Paulo, Brazil. It comprises three districts: Aricanduva, Carrão, and Vila Formosa. The largest graveyard and the largest shopping mall of the city, Centro Comercial Aricanduva, are located in this region.

== See also ==
- Roman Catholic Archdiocese of São Paulo
