= Antea LifeStyle Center =

Coordinates: 20.6742°N 100.4362°W

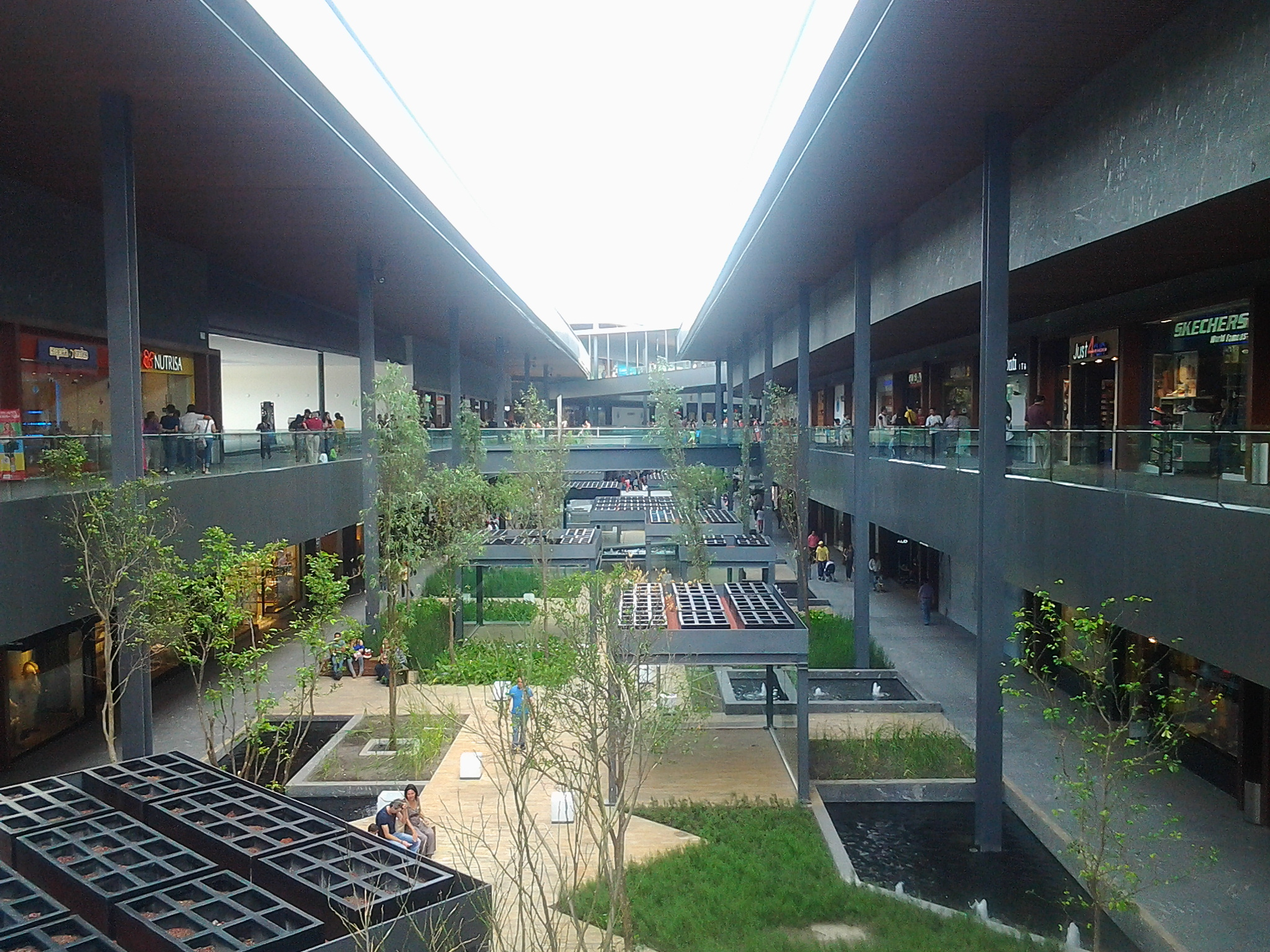
- Interactive map of the Antea LifeStyle Center area

General information
- Type: Shopping mall
- Location: Santiago de Querétaro; Querétaro Mexico, Paseo de la República, Juriquilla, Querétaro, Querétaro
- Inaugurated: November 2013

Technical details
- Floor count: 3
- Floor area: 271,000 m^{2}

Design and construction
- Developer: Grupo Sordo Madaleno

Antea LifeStyle Center or simply Antea is a shopping mall in the city of Querétaro, Mexico, which was opened in November 2013. Construction began in June 2011 and the mall opened in October 2013 for the first phase, which has a reported cost of $1 billion and will have a total area of 271,000 m^{2} of construction.

The first phase of the complex feature new to market retailers such as Tory Burch, Chanel, Burberry, Michael Kors, Carolina Herrera, Louis Vuitton, Chico's, Anne Fontaine, Dolce & Gabbana and Crate & Barrel. Dining options include California Pizza Kitchen, PF Changs and Texas de Brazil. The mall will also feature Pink Berry, Zara Home, Pottery Barn, Design Within Reach and a Ferrari – Maserati dealership.

== Gallery ==
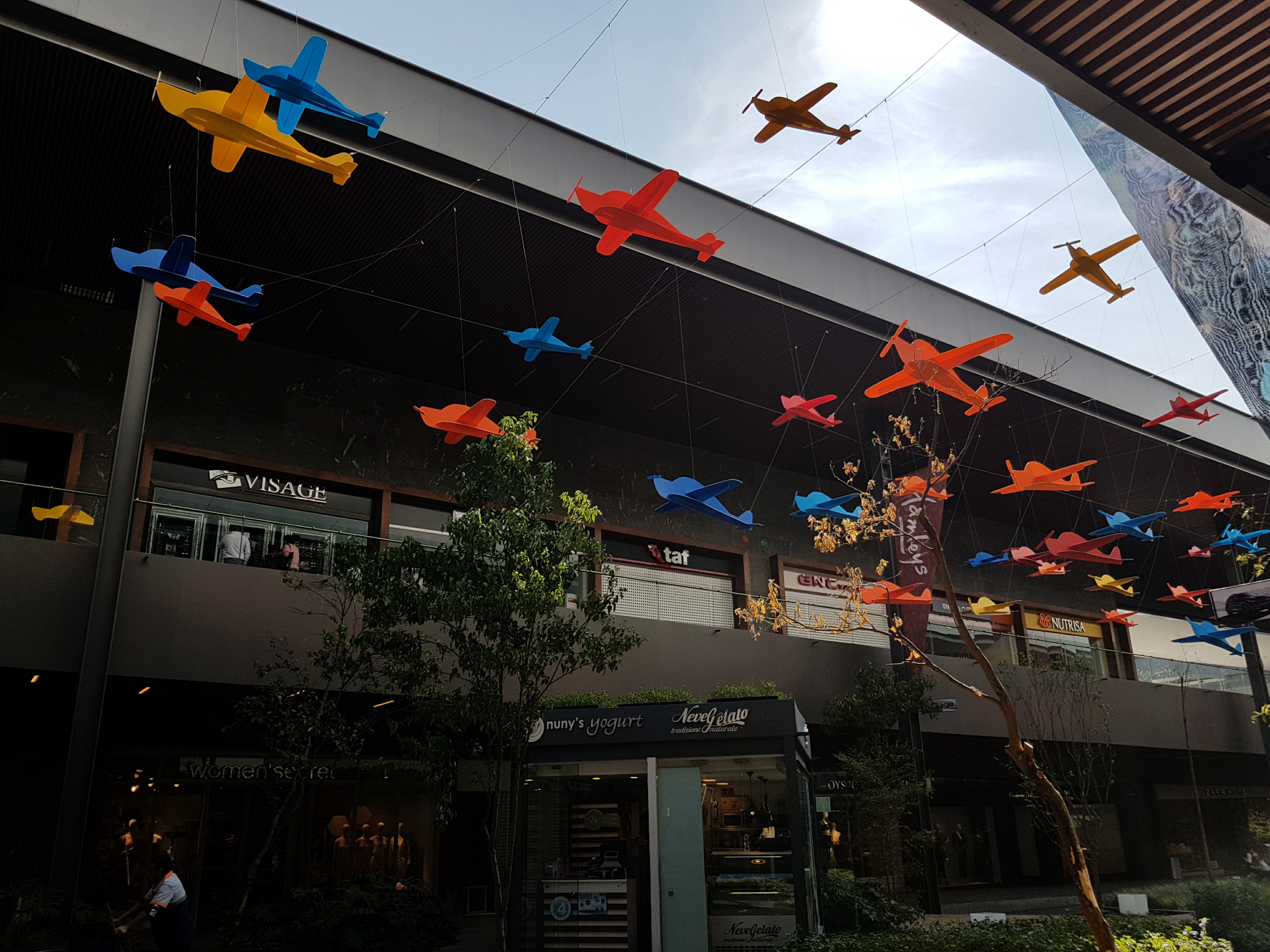
Airplanes in Antea Lifestyle Center mall

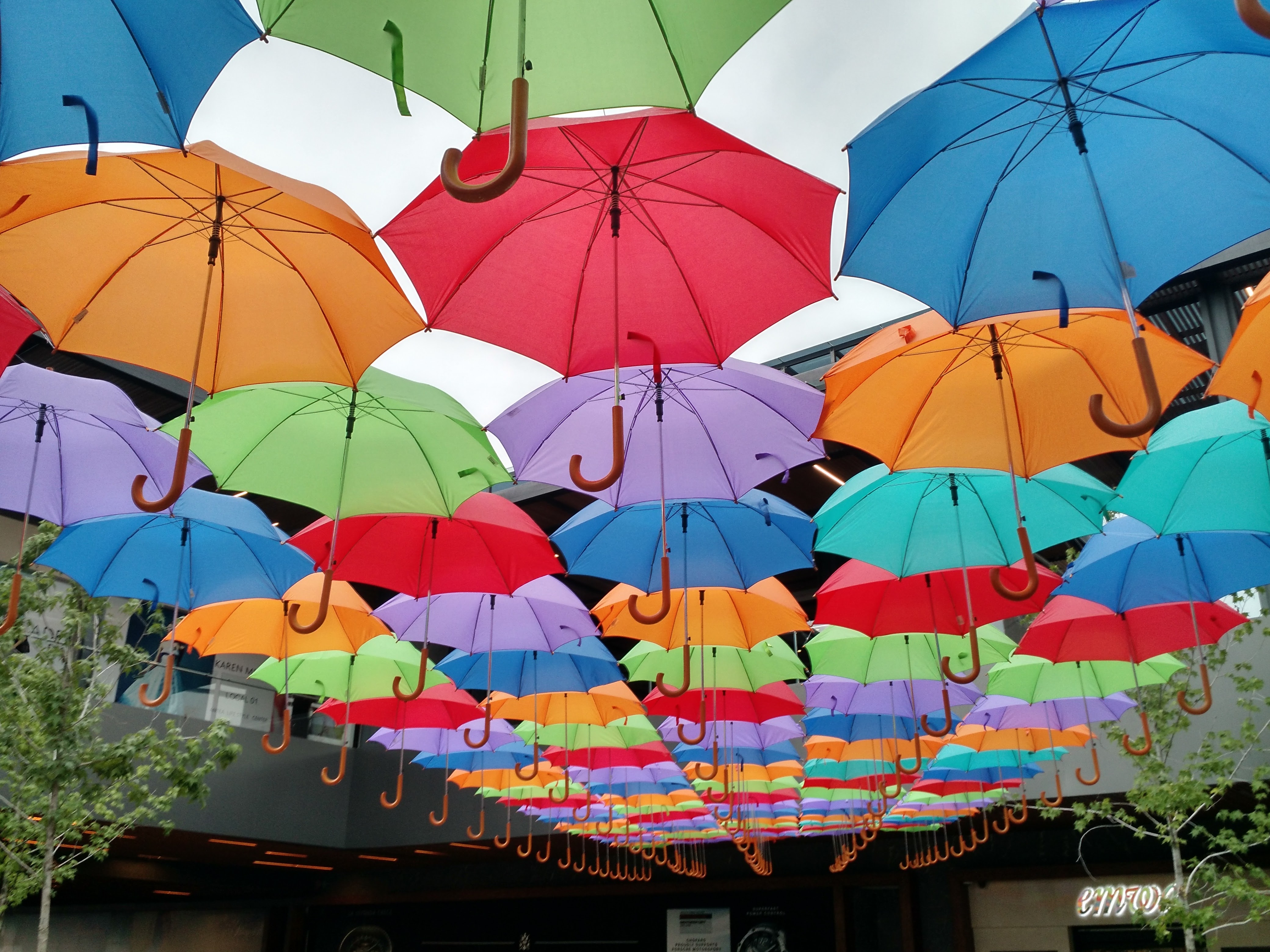
Umbrellas decorating Antea, as seen from the bottom

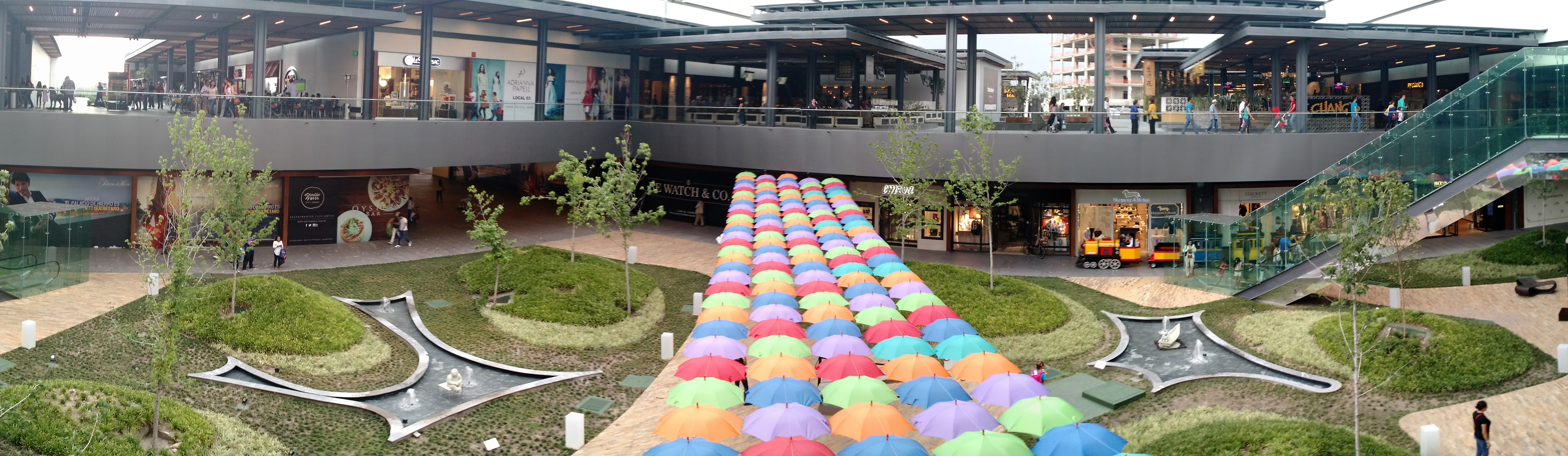
Panoramic view of one of the gardens in Antea
