= Subprefecture of Guaianases =

Coordinates: 23°33′S 46°25′W

- Subprefecture
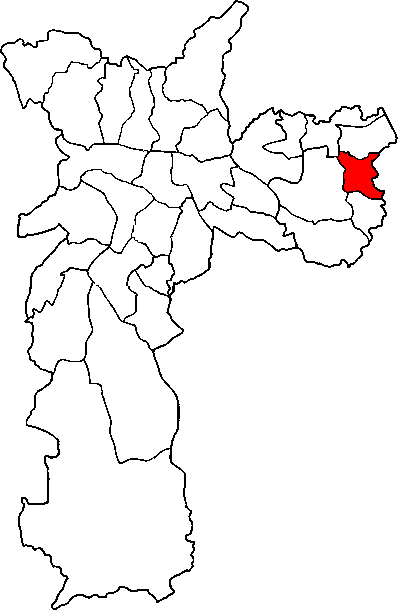
- Location of the Subprefecture of Guaianases in São Paulo

- Location of municipality of São Paulo within the State of São Paulo
- Country: Brazil
- Region: Southeast
- State: São Paulo
- Municipality: São Paulo
- Administrative Zone: East 2
- Districts: Guaianases, Lajeado

Government
  - Type: Subprefecture
  - Subprefect: Saint Clair Coutinho

Area
  - Total: 17.55 km^{2} (6.78 sq mi)

Population (2008)
  - Total: 291,193
- Website: Subprefeitura Guaianases (Portuguese)

The Subprefecture of Guaianases is one of 32 subprefectures of the city of São Paulo, Brazil. It comprises two districts: Guaianases and Lajeado.
