= Aricanduva (district of São Paulo) =

District of São Paulo, Brazil

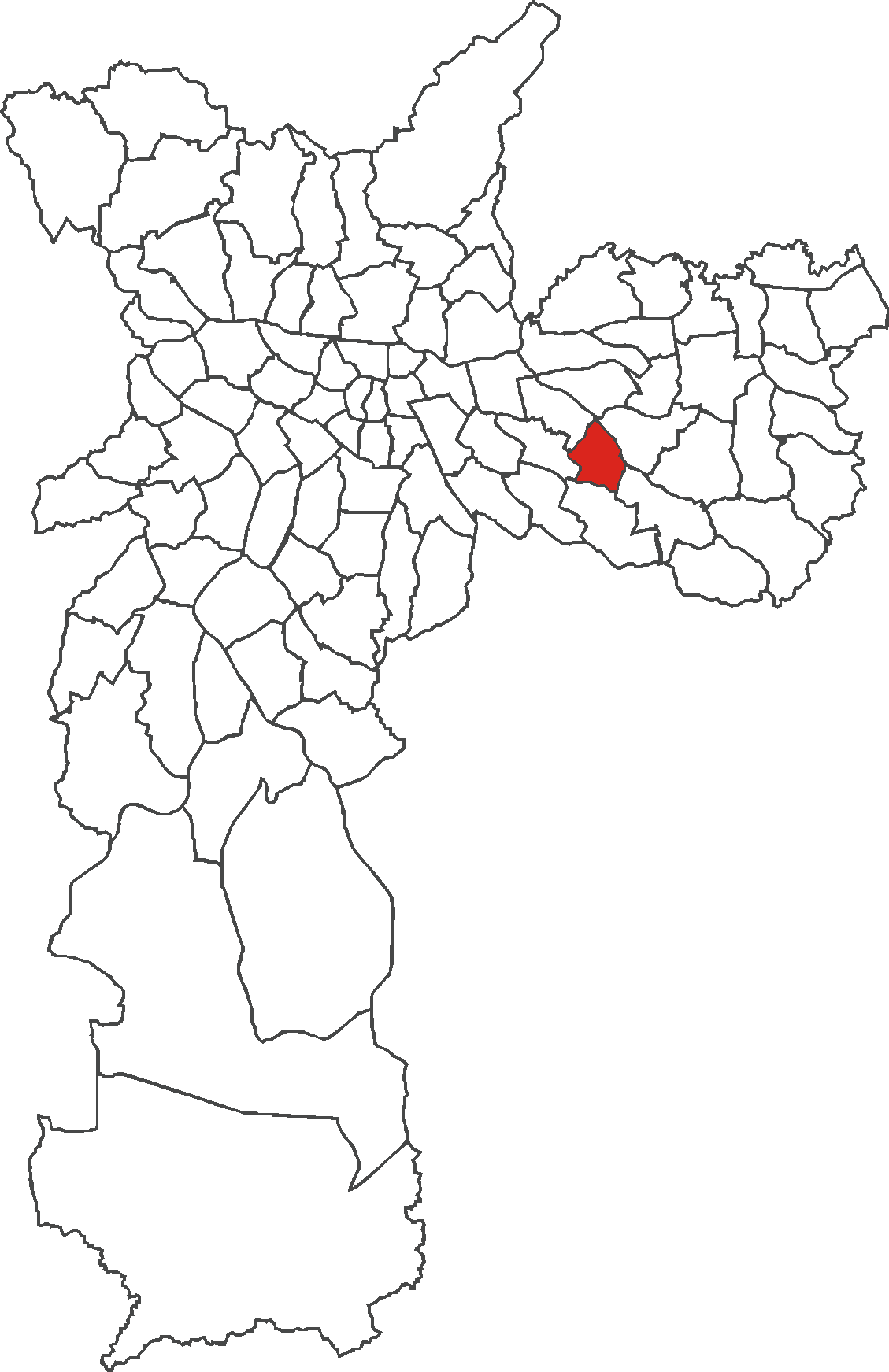
- Location in the city of São Paulo

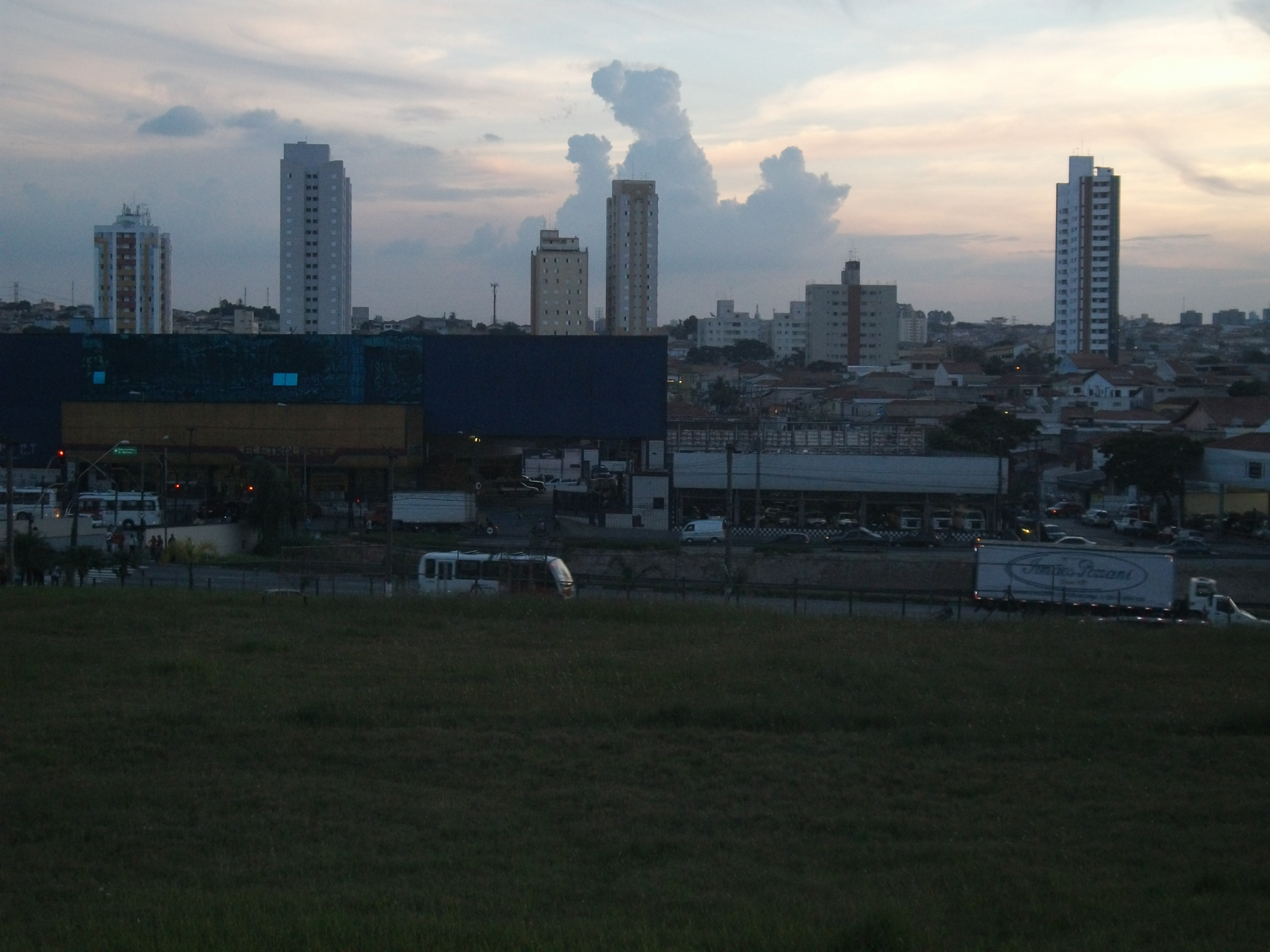
- Coordinates: 23°34′21″S 46°31′03″W
- Country: Brazil
- State: São Paulo
- Region: Southeast
- City: São Paulo
- Administrative Zone: Southeast
- Subprefecture: Aricanduva
- Bairros: List: Aricanduva; Jardim Aricanduva; Jardim Barreira Grande; Jardim Catarina; Jardim Cotching; Jardim das Rosas; Jardim Imperador; Jardim Galli; Jardim Haia do Carrão; Jardim Nice; Jardim São Eduardo; Jardim Tango; Jardim Vila Formosa; Parque Maria Luisa; Vila Antonieta; Vila Nova Iorque; Vila Rica; Vila Sara

Government
  - Type: Subprefecture
  - Subprefect: Jorge Augusto Leme

Area
  - Total: 6.8 km^{2} (2.6 sq mi)

Population (2008)
  - Total: 94,130
- HDI: 0.830 –high
- Website: Subprefecture of Aricanduva

Aricanduva is a district in the subprefecture of the same name in the city of São Paulo, Brazil. It is located along the west bank of the Aricanduva River, which crosses the city from east to southeast. The name Aricanduva originated from one of the indigenous languages of Brazil known as Tupi and means "place where there are many palm trees of the airi species".

== History ==
The Aricanduva district was administratively defined in 1999 as part of a general reorganization of the districts and subprefectures of São Paulo. It is believed the district was founded in the earlier 1900s (1902 or 1905).

== Transportation ==
The district is serviced by several SPTrans bus lines.

== See also ==
- Roman Catholic Archdiocese of São Paulo
