= Cidade Tiradentes (district of São Paulo) =

District of São Paulo, Brazil

Coordinates: 23.6181°S 46.407°W

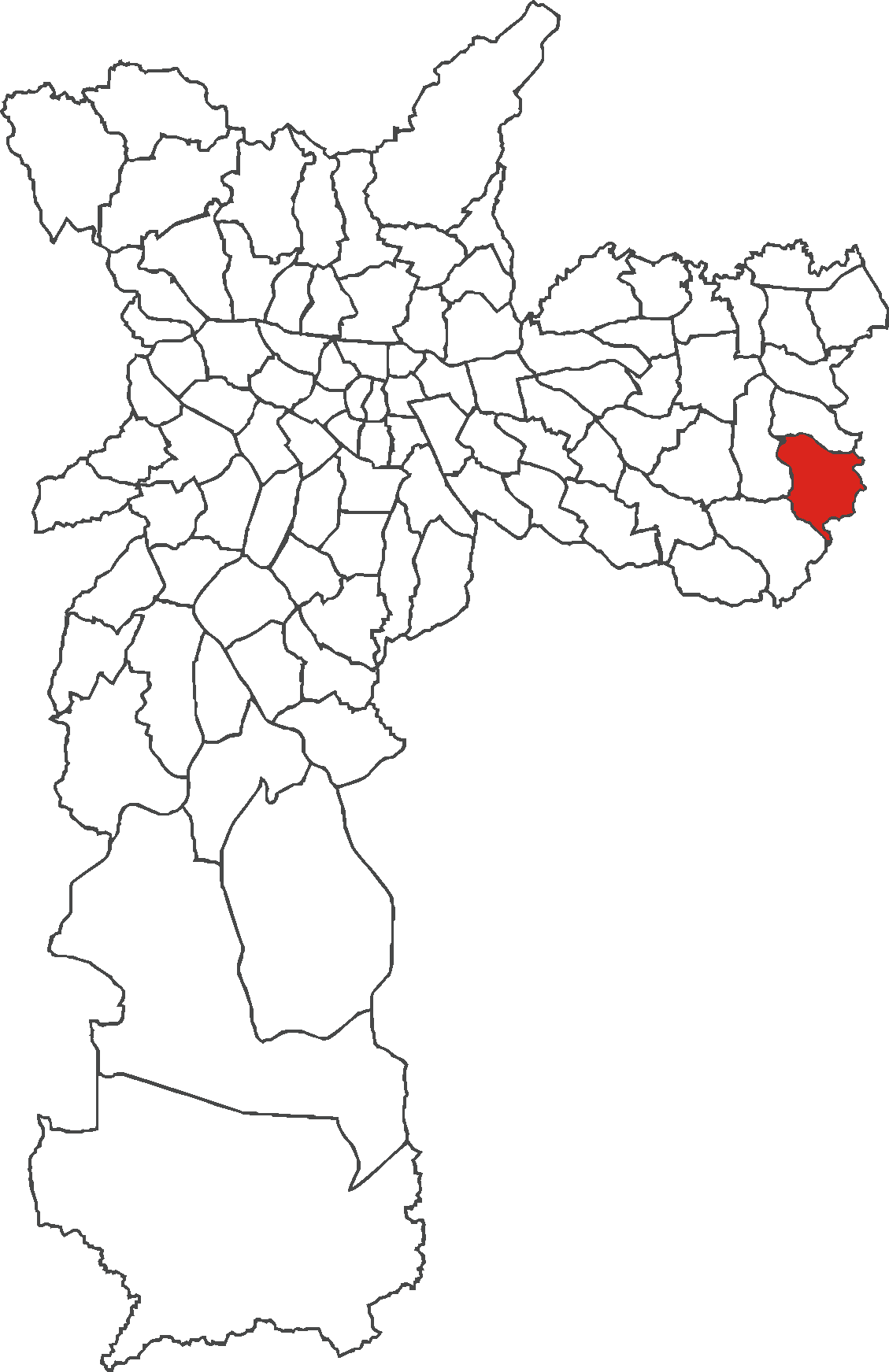
- District of the city of São Paulo
- Country: Brazil
- State: São Paulo
- Municipality: São Paulo
- Subprefecture: Cidade Tiradentes

Area
  - Total: 15.00 km^{2} (5.79 sq mi)

Population (2007)
  - Total: 211,501
  - Density: 14,100/km^{2} (37,000/sq mi)
- Website: Subprefecture of Cidade Tiradentes

Cidade Tiradentes is one of 96 districts in the city of São Paulo, Brazil.

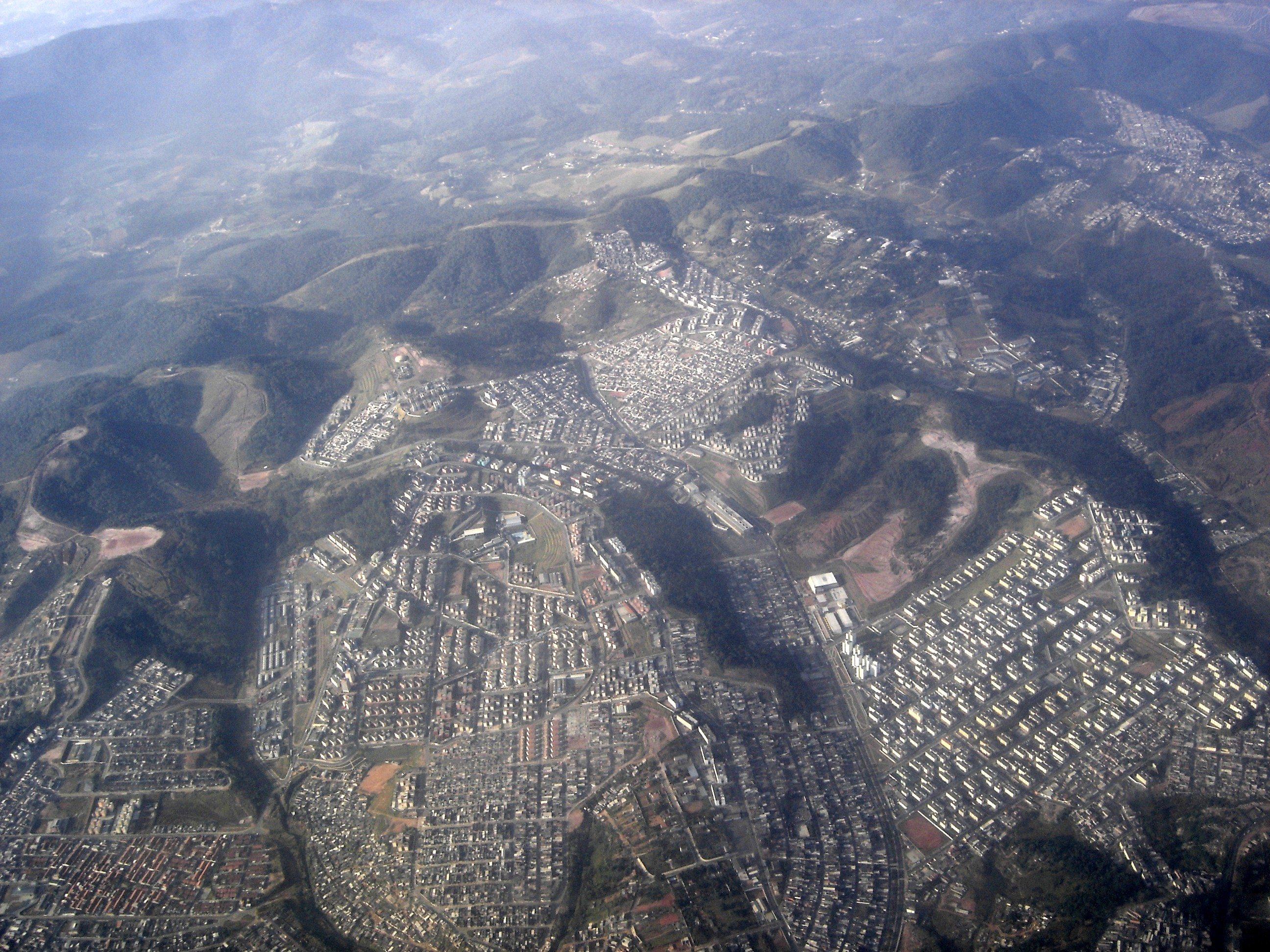
Cidade Tiradentes is a heavily populated commuter town in the outskirts of São Paulo consisting mainly of public housing projects. On average, its inhabitants spend 2 hours and 45 minutes a day commuting between home and work.
