= Guaianases (district of São Paulo) =

District of São Paulo, Brazil

Coordinates: 23.5732°S 46.4084°W

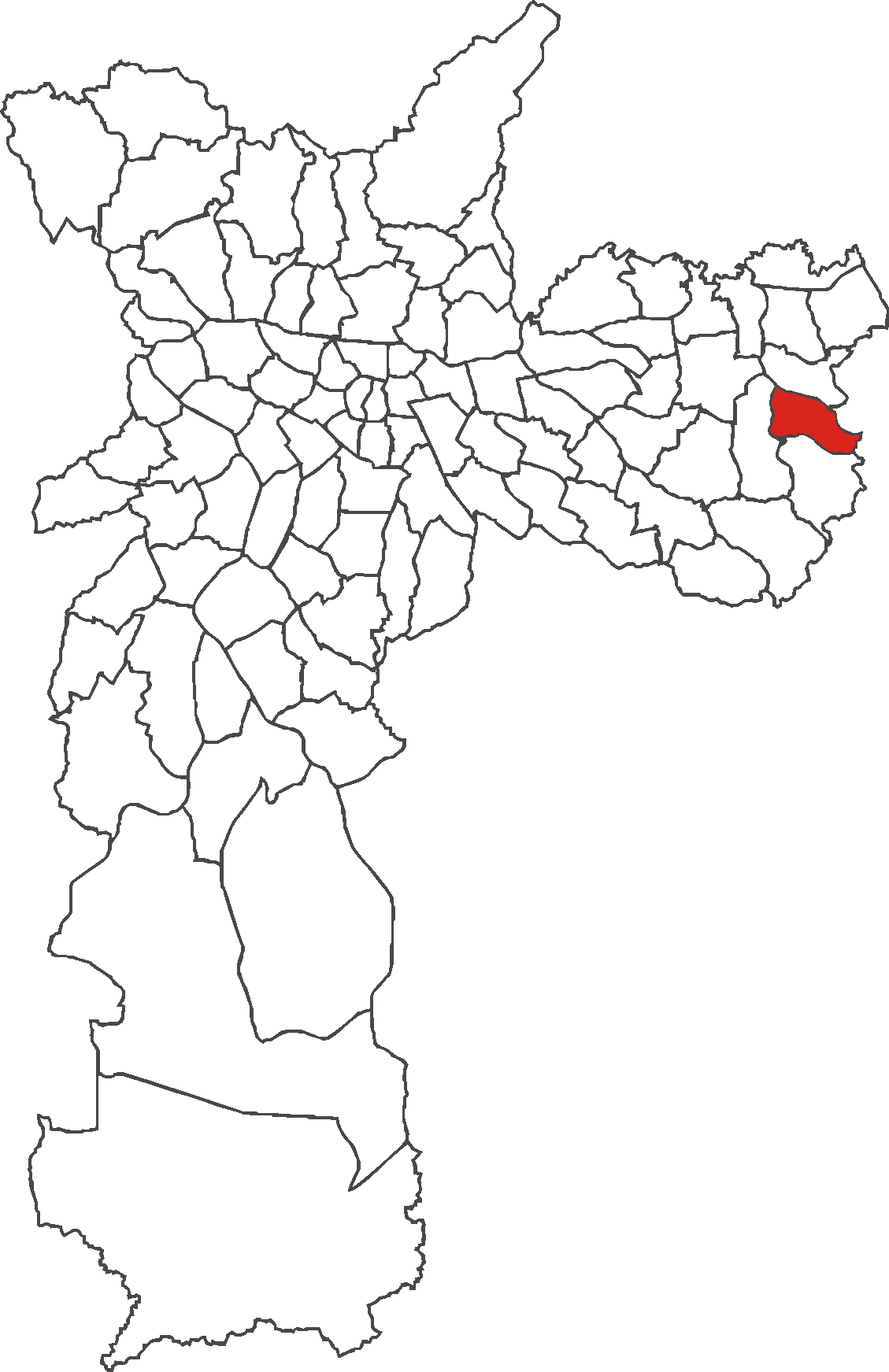
- District of the city of São Paulo
- Country: Brazil
- State: São Paulo
- Municipality: São Paulo
- Subprefecture: Guaianases

Area
  - Total: 8.60 km^{2} (3.32 sq mi)

Population (2007)
  - Total: 164,512
  - Density: 17,882/km^{2} (46,310/sq mi)
- Website: Subprefecture of Guaianases

Guaianases is one of 96 districts in the city of São Paulo, Brazil.
