= Itaim Paulista =

District of São Paulo, Brazil

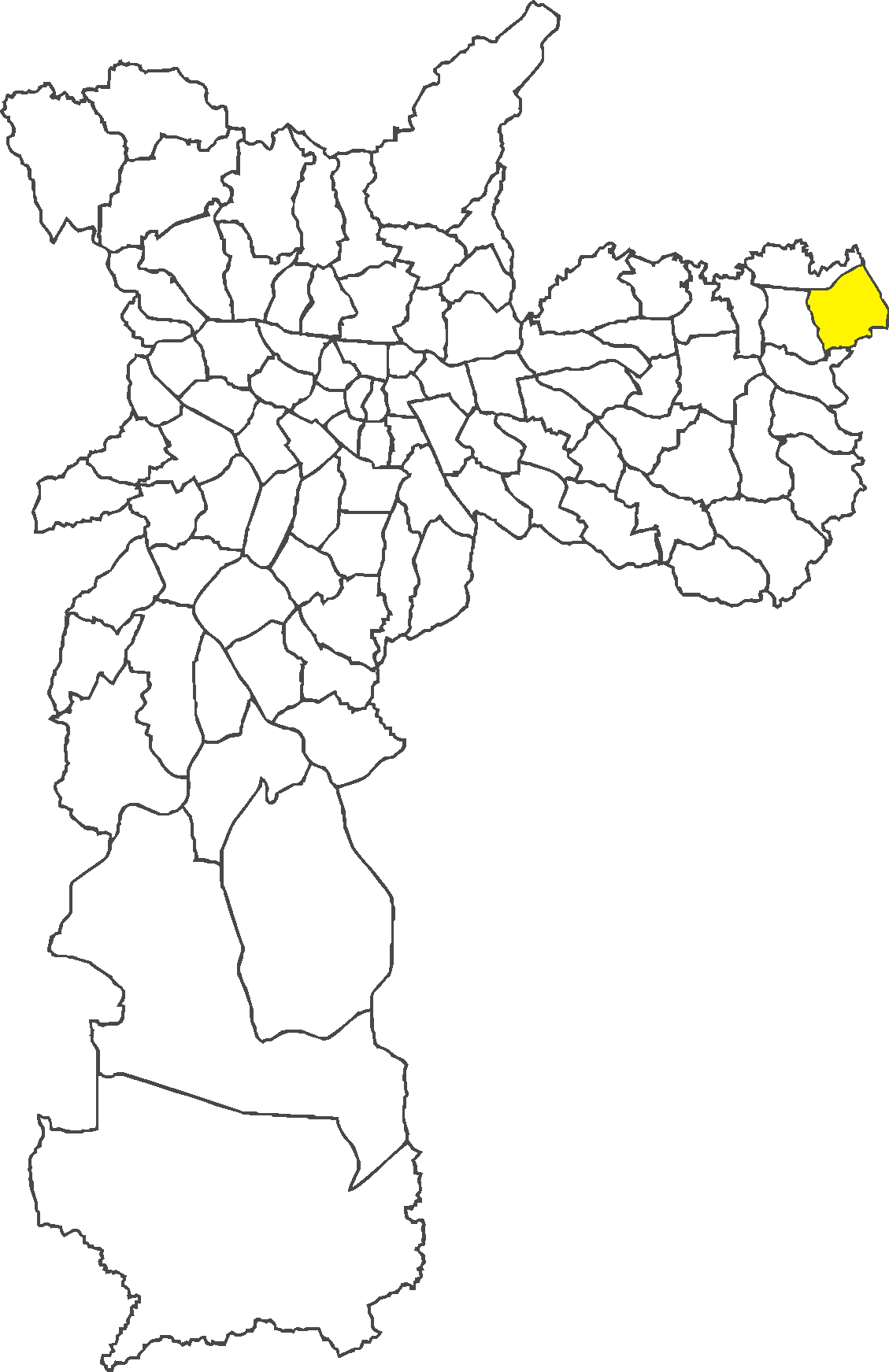
- Location in the city of São Paulo
- Country: Brazil
- State: São Paulo
- City: São Paulo

Government
  - Type: Subprefecture
  - Subprefect: João dos Santos de Souza

Population (2000)
  - Total: 194.671
  - Density: 16.222/km^{2} (42.01/sq mi)
- HDI: 0.762-medium
- Website: Subprefecture of Itaim Paulista/Vila Curuçá

Itaim Paulista is a district in the subprefecture of the same name in the city of São Paulo, Brazil. The name Itaim comes from Tupi and means Little Stone.

There is a large Pentecostal Evangelical Protestant presence in the suburban areas along with a flourishing Catholic community.

Despite significant poverty there is a surfaced road network and a good basic sanitation system.

The area is served by banks, retail and wholesale shopping establishments, supermarkets, hospitals and clinics. The Shopping Itaim Paulista shopping centre and the Itaim Paulista General Hospital were opened recently.

The area is linked to the rest of São Paulo by the Metropolitan Train Company (CPTM)'s Line 12. The local stations are Itaim Paulista (CPTM) and Jardim Romano (CPTM). The area is connected by road to Itaquaquecetuba by the Avenida Marechal Tito, to Ferraz de Vasconcelos by the Avenida Tibúrcio de Sousa and Itajuibe Street and to Poá by a bridge over the Três Pontes (Three Bridges) river.

== History ==
=== Early settlement ===
The area occupied today by the District of Itaim Paulista was first settled in the early years of the 17th century by Portuguese awarded grants of land under the semaria system. In 1610–11, the Bandeirante Domingos de Góes received a grant of land in the "Boi Sentado" area near the Tietê River. This passed into the hands of the Carmelite priests in 1621. It was during this period that the chapel of Our Lady of Biacica was constructed (the name derives from the Tupi word "imbeicica", signifying a tough vine commonly found along the Tietê River). The chapel is considered symbolic of the area's first permanent settlement. Calculated from the date of the chapel's construction, Itaim Paulista is 317 years old. Reckoned from the probable date of arrival of the bandeirantes and priests, Itaim Paulista is 390 years old. The official anniversary of Itaim Paulista's foundation is celebrated on the date when the District became separate from the District of São Miguel Paulista in 1980.

=== Growth of Itaim Paulista ===
The growth of the area was constrained by the proximity of larger villages such as São Miguel Paulista and Lajeado. During its first few centuries Itaim Paulista was a collection of small farms, ranches and smallholdings, held back by inadequate infrastructure and overshadowed by neighbouring communities. It was only towards the end of the 18th century that Itaim Paulista began to grow. The arrival of the railway (the Ferrovia Estrada do Norte, formerly the Central do Brasil) in the 19th century marked the start of a century of growth. This began slowly, with new housing built following the line of the railway track.

In the upper part of the area, there was substantial development along the Rua Tibúrcio de Souza, a major road leading to the nearby municipality of Ferraz de Vasconcelos. Around the turn of the 19th century many families from Germany and in particular the former Yugoslavia purchased small farms in the same area, concentrating on agriculture and dairy farming. Many of the descendants of these families still live locally, in the area known today as Vila Melo and Caixa d'Agua.

During the 1930s and 1940s the most profitable local industries were the brickworks producing bricks and roof tiles. In the 1950s Itaim Paulista experienced major changes as the pace of settlement increased. In 1957 the creation of the parish of São João Batista de Itaim — St John the Baptist of Itaim — was a further stimulus to the growth of the area.

=== Autonomous status ===
In the 1970s the Prefecture of São Paulo, the city's central authority, decentralised administrative functions to newly created local authorities, including São Miguel Paulista. Itaim Paulista was included in the Subprefecture of São Miguel Paulista. However Itaim Paulista was neglected by the São Miguel administration, who prioritised São Miguel itself and the areas around the commercial center. With central funding proportional to the share of population, the contribution from Itaim Paulista ensured that the budget for São Miguel Paulista was always the Prefecture's third largest. However investment was inevitably targeted on São Miguel Paulista and Itaim Paulista was treated as simply a means of ensuring population figures remained high.

On 19 May 1980 Itaim Paulista was separated off from São Miguel Paulista and the budget is now administered directly by Itaim Paulista, to the benefit of local residents.

=== Parish Church of São João Batista ===
On 17 June 1951, Itaim Paulista's first chapel was opened. It was built on land deeded to the Archdiocese of São Paulo by the Cia. Bandeirantes S/A corporation in 1950. At that time the main São Paulo-Rio highway ran alongside the property and the water used for the chapel's construction was brought by truck from the Itaim river in 200-liter drums.

The original chapel was demolished on 30 May 1953, to make way for a new parish church, completed on 15 December 1957. This church was demolished in 2008 and a new, larger parish church is currently being built to serve the local population.

=== Avenida Marechal Tito ===
The arrival of the Central do Brasil Railroad improved transport connections with São Paulo and Rio de Janeiro, but road travel remained very difficult. In 1908 it took the French motorist Conde Lesdain (Comte de Lesdain) 45 days to complete the journey between the two cities by car.

Under his slogan "to govern is to open roads", Washington Luís, Mayor of São Paulo (1914–1919), Governor of the State of São Paulo (1920–1924) and President of the Republic (1926–1930), encouraged the expansion of the urban highways network, largely following the pattern laid down during the colonial era. In 1922 he opened the São Paulo-Rio Highway, following one of the traditional colonial era routes and passing through São Miguel Paulista, Itaim Paulista and Mogi das Cruzes en route to Jacareí. In 1928 when the road was fully opened the journey took 10 hours.

Complementing the existing railroad service, the new highway helped encourage the growth of Itaim Paulista. Over time the highway became an important route serving the town center of Itaim Paulista and an integral part of the local urban road network. Since the opening of the President Dutra Highway (BR-116) in 1951 the old highway has ceased to be the principal connection between São Paulo and Rio. When Itaim Paulista became a self-administering authority in its own right the road was given its present name, commemorating the President of Yugoslavia who died in 1980.

Avenida Marechal Tito is the main thoroughfare of Itaim Paulista, a district of São Paulo. It provides access to the district's main public facilities and commercial areas. It was originally paved with paving stones and was resurfaced with asphalt.

Other important roads in the town are Avenida Kemel Addas, Viaduto Carlito Maia, Estrada Dom João Nery, Rua Doutor José Pereira Gomes, Rua Itajuíbe, Avenida Barão de Alagoas, Avenida Itaim and Rua Tibúrcio de Souza.

=== Itaim Paulista Rail Station ===
The CPTM rail system (Line 12 in dark blue)

Construction of the Poá branch line (also known as the Calmon Viana branch) began in 1921. To make freight transport easier the track had fewer curves than the São Paulo branch. Itaim Paulista Station was completed and officially opened on 7 February 1926 but construction work on the line was abandoned for eight years and the line was only opened on 1 January 1934. On 1 March 1962 the last steam engine to run on the line made the journey from Roosevelt station to Itaim Paulista station. Since 1994 CPTM has been responsible for the station.

In 2006 the relatively new (1979) station building was demolished as part of CPTM's Line 12 modernization program. The new station was handed over on 28 May 2008.

=== Hydrography ===
Three small rivers flow north to south through the District of Itaim Paulista, emptying into the Rio Tietê (Tietê River). These are the Itaim, the Tijuco Preto and the Três Pontes (Three Bridges). The Lajeado river marks the boundary between Itaim Paulista on the eastern side and Vila Curuçá. In the past these rivers provided local residents with a source of income but now, like the Tietê, they are very badly polluted. Along with the three Vila Curuca rivers, the watercourses have been included in the Prefecture of São Paulo's "Corrego Limpo" clean-up program

The Tietê was an important source of gravel and sand used as construction materials for the town's development.

== Demographic information ==
Sex: male 49%, female 51%

Educational attainment: elementary education 44%, secondary education 40%, higher education 16%

Socio-economic class structure: Class A 1%, Class B 22%, Class C 67%, Class D 9%, Class E 1%

Religion: Catholicism 52%, Evangelical Protestantism 24%, No religion/atheism 10%, Jehovah's Witnesses 4%, Rastafari movement 2%, The Church of Jesus Christ of Latter-day Saints 1%

Color/race (IBGE classification): white 36%, brown 21%, black 38%

Politics (party membership or support): Partido dos Trabalhadores (PT) 41%, Partido da Social Democracia Brasileira (PSDB) 28%, Partido do Movimento Democrático Brasileiro (PMDB) 7%, Partido da República (PR) 5%, Partido Comunista do Brasil (PC do B) 2%, Other parties 23%

Housing: residential property occupancy 44026, shanty accommodation (favelas) 7748, homeless 12.

Population:

- Estimated population in 2000: 194,671
- Annual growth rate: 2.06%
- Annual birth rate: 27.29%
- Annual immigration: 1764
- Annual mortality rate (general population): 5.45%
- Annual child mortality rate: 18.62%

(Source Itaim Paulista website, 24 August 2008 and IBGE (Brazilian Statistical Institute) 1996-2000)

== External linkings ==
- Portuguese Wikipedia Itaim Paulista article
- District webpage (in Portuguese language)
- Itaim Paulista Portal (in Portuguese language)
