= Aricanduva River =

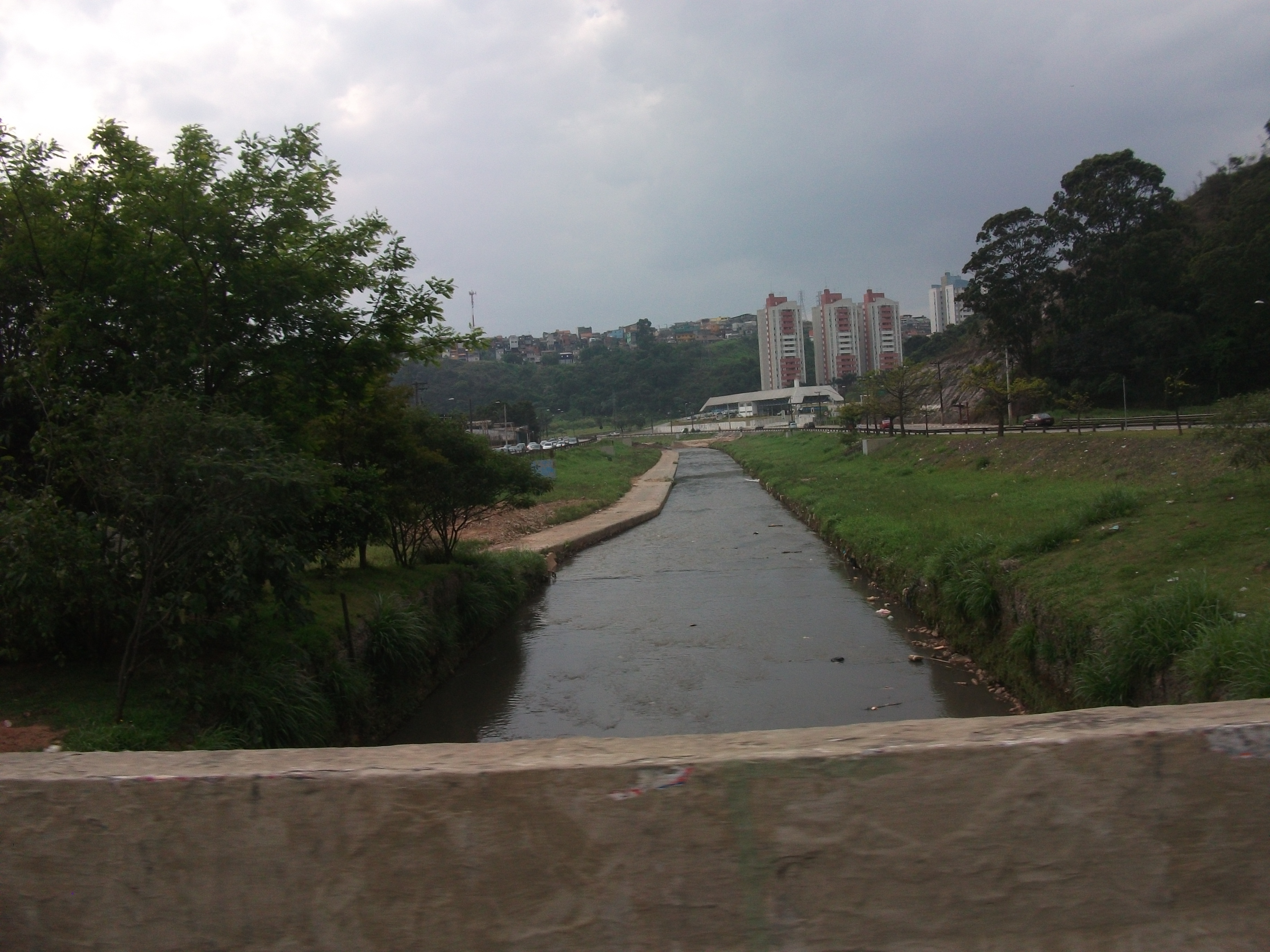
- Aricanduva River close to Parque do Carmo region.
- Native name: Rio Aricanduva (Portuguese)

Location
- Country: Brazil
- Location: São Paulo city, São Paulo state

Physical characteristics
- Source
  - location: Pico do Cruzeiro, São Paulo city
- Mouth: Tietê River
  - location: São Paulo city
  - coordinates: 23°31′S 46°34′W
- Length: 28 km (17 mi)
- Basin size: 100 km^{2} (39 sq mi)

The Aricanduva River (in Portuguese: Rio Aricanduva) is a river of São Paulo state in southeastern Brazil.

== See also ==
- List of rivers of São Paulo
