= Vila Formosa =

District of São Paulo, Brazil

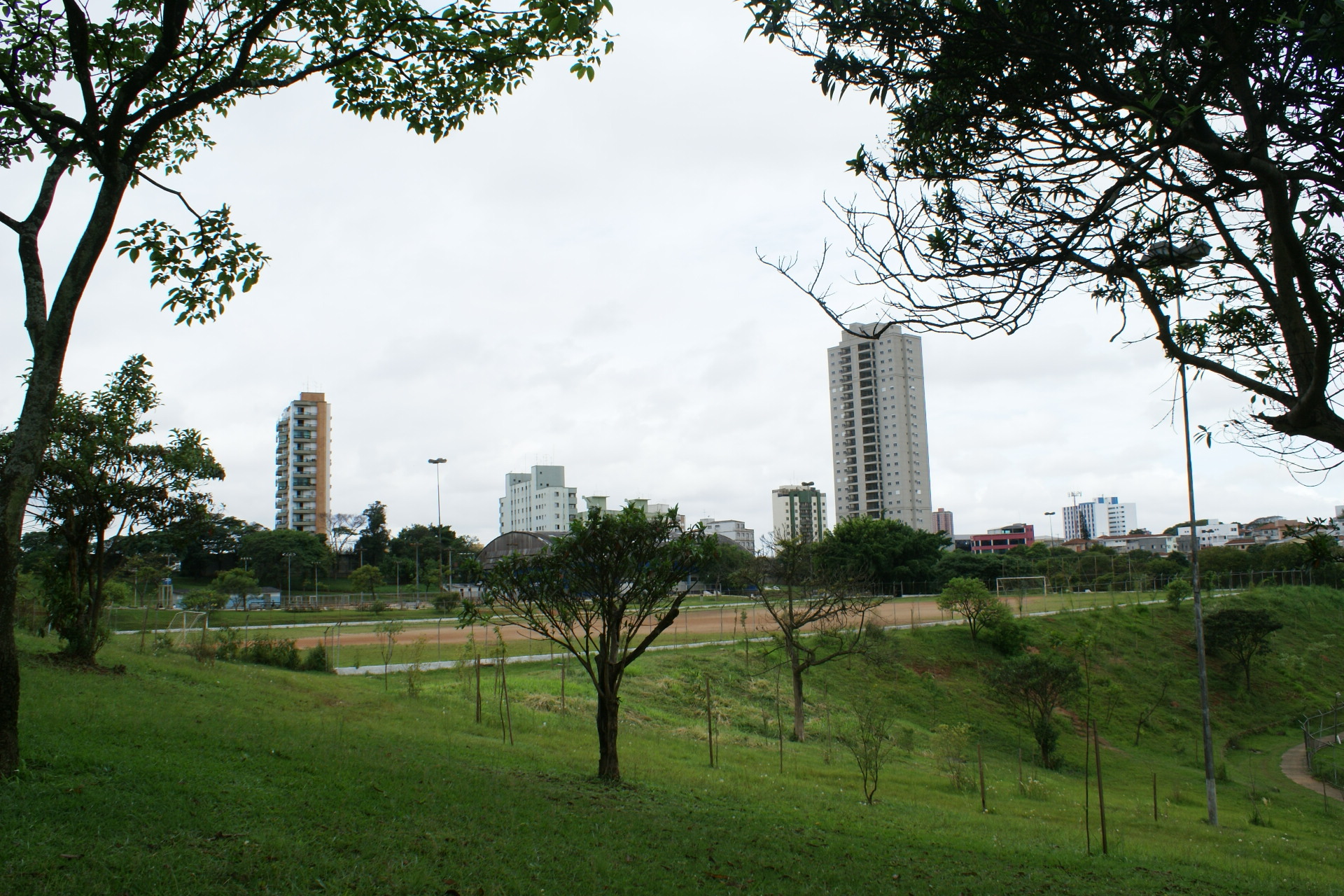

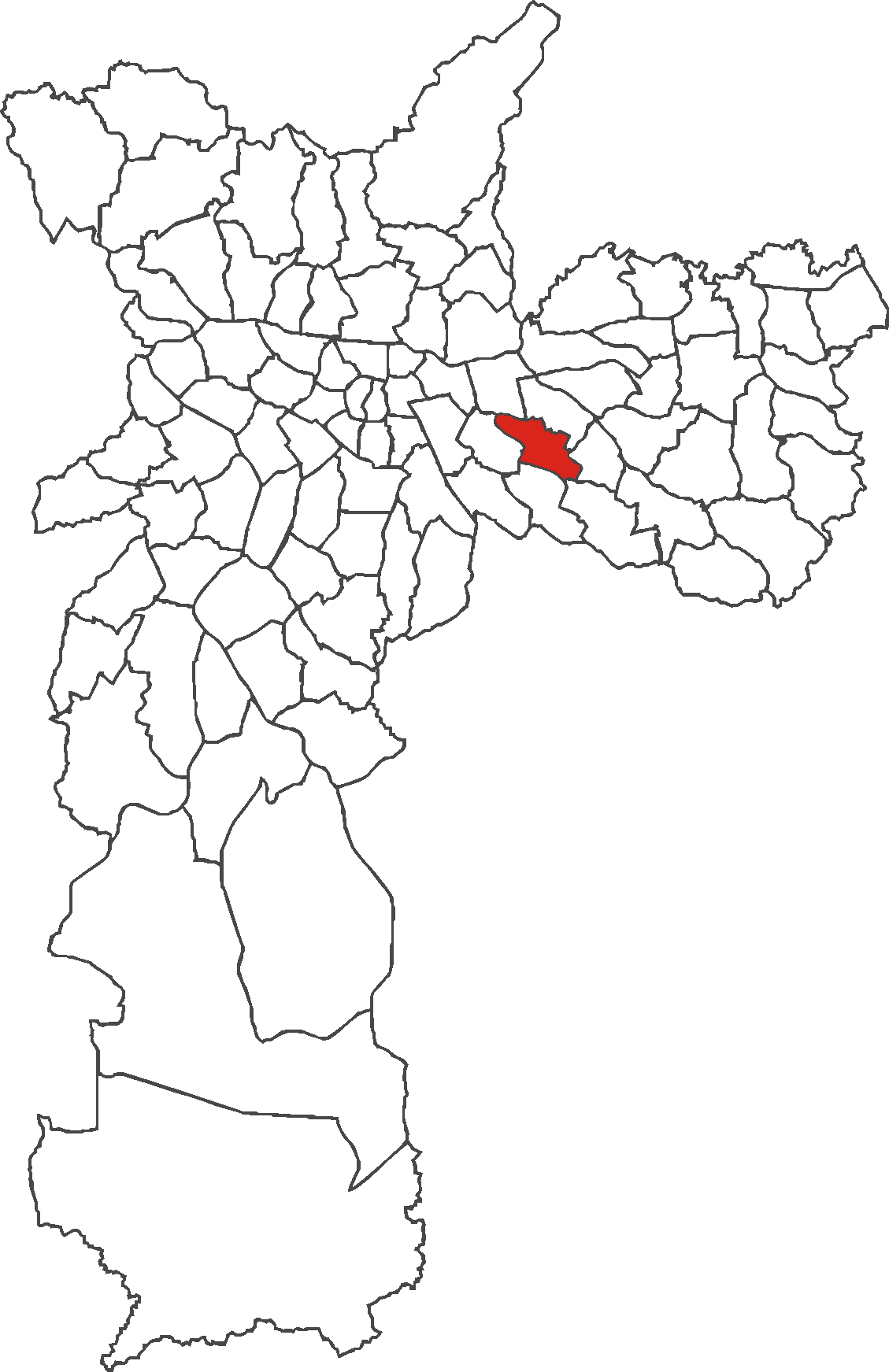
- District of the city of São Paulo
- Coordinates: 23.567°S 46.5409°W
- Country: Brazil
- State: São Paulo
- Municipality: São Paulo
- Subprefecture: Aricanduva

Area
  - Total: 7.40 km^{2} (2.86 sq mi)

Population (2007)
  - Total: 94,799
  - Density: 12,800/km^{2} (33,200/sq mi)
- Website: aricanduva.prefeitura.sp.gov.br

Vila Formosa is one of the 96 districts in the city of São Paulo, Brazil.

== History ==
Founded in 1923, Vila Formosa is located in the east side of the city of São Paulo. Before 1923 it was part of the district of Tatuapé. Most of the region belonged to the Casa Grande family who owned a large part of the region that later was acquired by the Jacob brothers.

== See also ==
- Roman Catholic Archdiocese of São Paulo
