= São Paulo/Guarulhos International Airport =

Primary airport serving São Paulo, Brazil

São Paulo/Guarulhos–Governor André Franco Montoro International Airport Aeroporto Internacional de São Paulo/Guarulhos–Governador André Franco Montoro

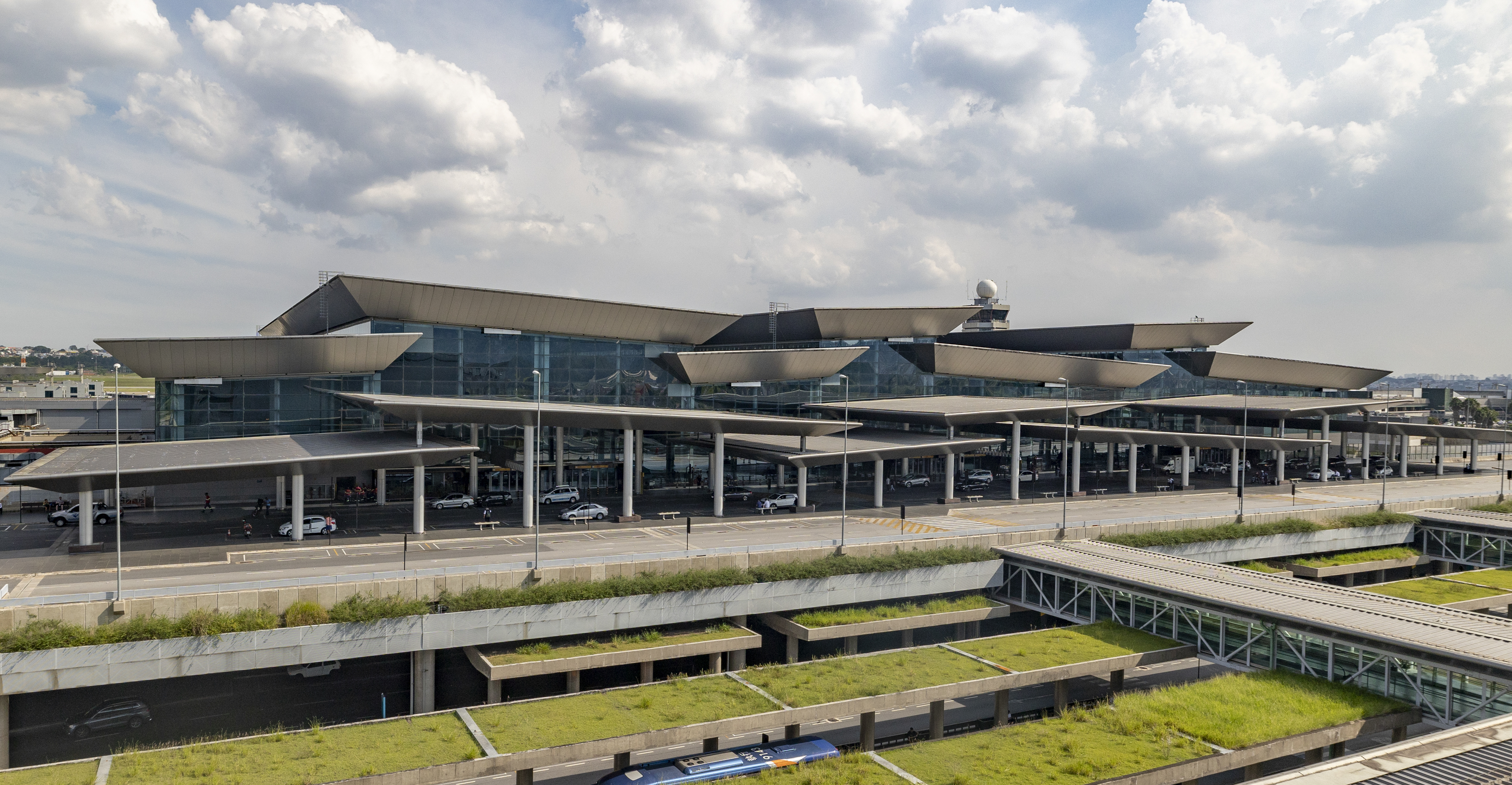
- IATA: GRU; ICAO: SBGR; LID: SP0002

Summary
- Airport type: Public / Military
- Operator: Infraero (1985–2012); GRU Airport (2012–present)
- Serves: São Paulo
- Location: Guarulhos, Brazil
- Opened: 20 January 1985; 41 years ago
- Hub for: Gol Linhas Aéreas; LATAM Brasil
- Focus city for: Azul Brazilian Airlines
- Time zone: BRT (UTC−03:00)
- Elevation AMSL: 750 m (2,460 ft)
- Coordinates: 23°26′08″S 46°28′23″W
- Website: www.gru.com.br

Maps
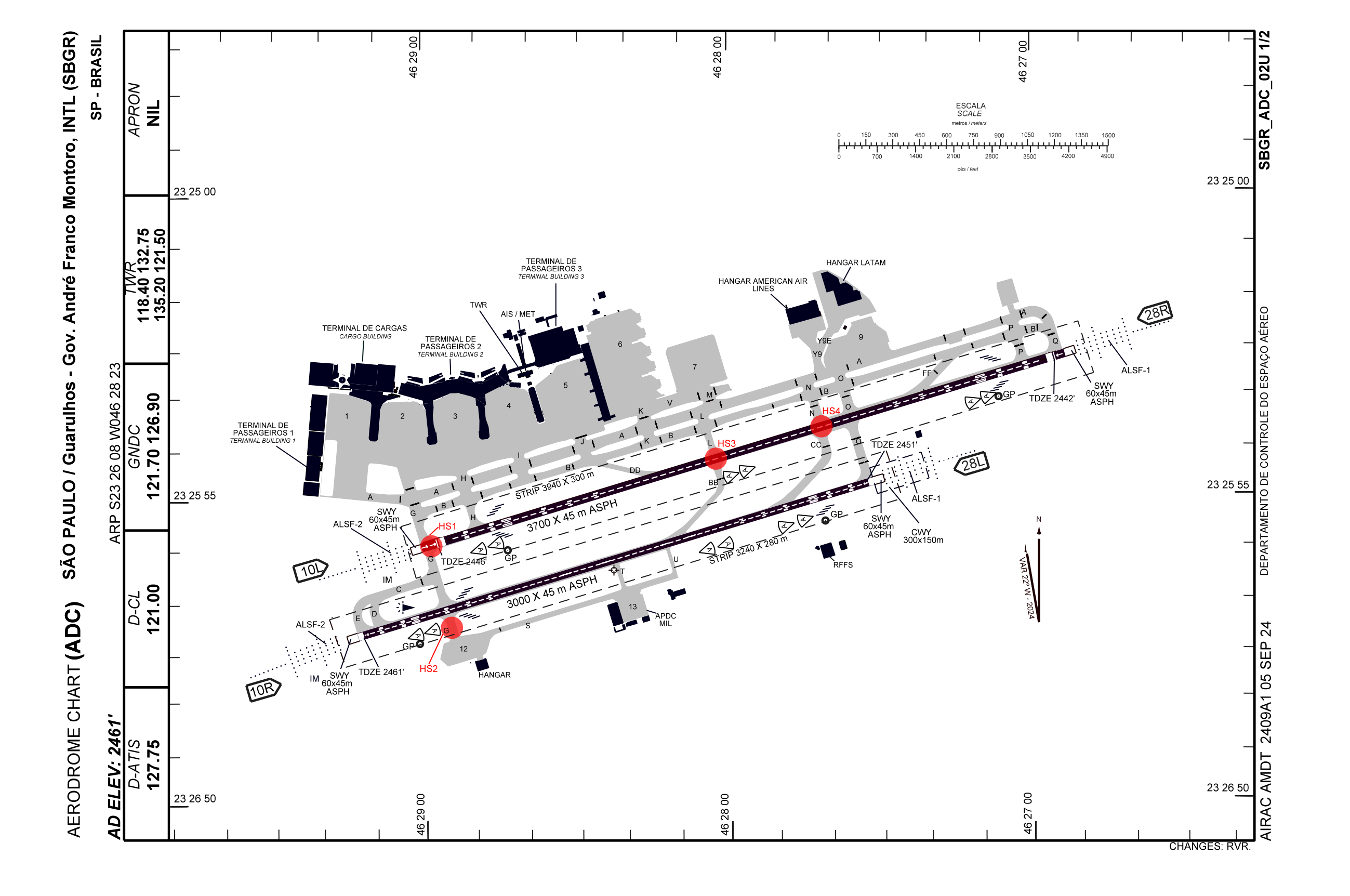
- DECEA airport chart

- Location in São Paulo State Location in Brazil Location in South America

Runways
Direction	Length		Surface
Direction	m	ft	Surface
10L/28R	3,700	12,139	Asphalt
10R/28L	3,000	9,843	Asphalt

Statistics (2025)
- Passengers: 47,188,085 ▲8%
- Aircraft operations: 305,188 ▲6%
- Statistics: GRU Airport; Sources: Airport website, ANAC, DECEA

São Paulo/Guarulhos–Governor André Franco Montoro International Airport (IATA: GRU, ICAO: SBGR), commonly known as São Paulo/Guarulhos International Airport, is the primary international airport serving São Paulo, located in the municipality of Guarulhos, in the state of São Paulo. It is the largest airport in Brazil and Latin America, and one of the 50 busiest in the world by passenger traffic. It is popularly known locally as either Cumbica Airport, after the district where it is located and the Brazilian Air Force base that exists at the Guarulhos Airport, after the municipality where it is located. Since 28 November 2001, the airport has been named after André Franco Montoro (1916–1999), former Governor of São Paulo state. The airport was rebranded as GRU Airport in 2012.

The airport is the busiest in Brazil in terms of transported passengers, aircraft operations, and cargo handled. Guarulhos has slot restrictions, operating with a maximum of 45 operations/hour and being one of the five airports with such restrictions in Brazil (the others are São Paulo-Congonhas, Brasília, Belo Horizonte-Pampulha and Rio de Janeiro-Santos Dumont).

Since 2012, the airport has been operated by a consortium composed of Invepar S/A, Airports Company South Africa, and Infraero. Some of its facilities are shared with the São Paulo Air Force Base of the Brazilian Air Force.

In 2017, it was considered by the company OAG the second best in punctuality in the world and first in Latin America, a position above that achieved in the previous year. In 2019 the airport achieved the same position in a survey carried out by FlightStats. In 2021, it was chosen by the Club Med study as one of the 35 best in the world for long layovers. In a survey carried out by Cirium Aviation, it reached first position among the most punctual large airports in the world and second place in the "Global" category in 2024; that same year, São Paulo/Guarulhos International Airport was named one of the best airports in the world by AirHelp.

== History ==
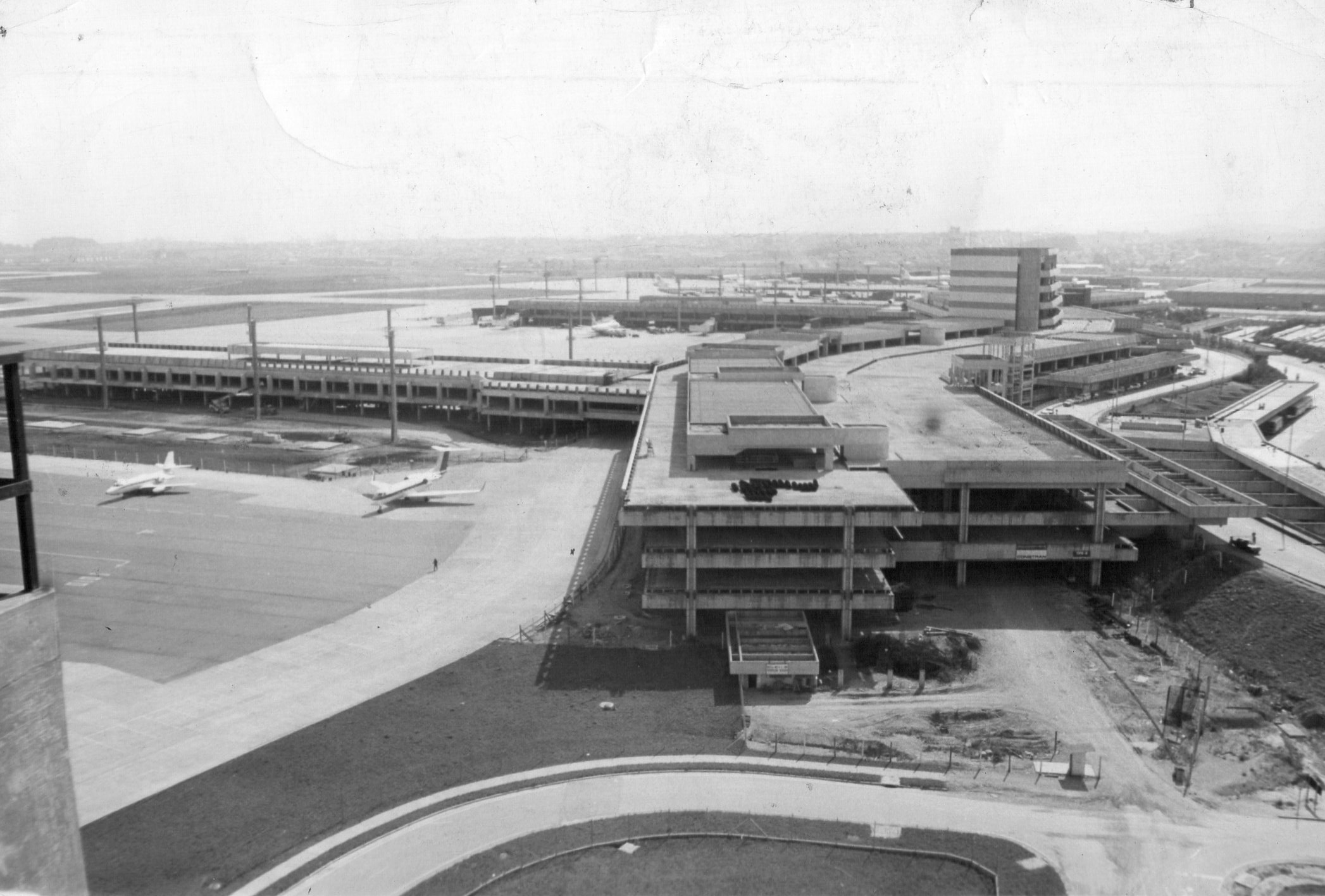
Part of terminal 2 in construction (1987)

In 2010, the airport served more than 26.8 million passengers, an increase of 24% over 2009 and passenger volumes were 31% in excess of its capacity rated at 20.5 million per year at its present configuration.

In order to relieve the acute overcrowding at the Terminals 1 and 2, Infraero announced on 17 May 2011 that the former cargo terminals of the defunct airlines VASP and Transbrasil, later used by Federal Agencies, would undergo renovations and adaptations for use as domestic passenger terminals with remote boarding. This new terminal was initially called Terminal 4 (T4). The first phase of the renovations, comprising the former VASP terminal, opened on 8 February 2012, and the second phase, comprising the former Transbrasil terminal, was opened in June 2013. Contrary to what had been announced before, the new terminal will be permanent. Webjet was the first airline to use the new facility. The new terminal, in its first phase, increased the capacity of the airport in 5.5 million passengers/year and, in the second phase to 8 million passengers/year. In total, Guarulhos would then be able to handle 28.5 million passengers/year.

Responding to critiques to the situation of its airports, on 18 May 2011, Infraero released a list evaluating some of its most important airports according to its saturation levels. According to the list, Guarulhos was considered to be critically saturated, operating above 85% of its capacity.

Following a decision made on 26 April 2011 by the Federal Government for private companies being granted concessions to explore some Infraero airports, on 6 February 2012, the administration of the airport was conceded, for 20 years, to the Consortium Invepar–ACSA, also known as GRU Airport, composed by the Brazilian Invepar, an Investments and Funds Society (90%) and the South African ACSA–Airports Company South Africa (10%). Infraero, the state-run organisation, remains with 49% of the shares of the company incorporated for the administration.

On 2 December 2015, the airport's terminals were renumbered. The former Terminal 4 was renumbered Terminal 1; the former terminals 1 and 2, which were wings of a single building, became the new Terminal 2. The Terminal 3 kept its numbering. The new numbering reflects the order by which terminals are reached when one arrives at the airport by the access road, and is expected to be less confusing in the long term. Check-in counters and gates were also renumbered, with the first digit being now the new terminal number.

On 28 October 2015, the National Civil Aviation Agency of Brazil (Anac) authorised Airbus A380 operations at Guarulhos Airport, effective four days later. The authorisation was granted after extensive works were conducted on the runways and taxiways (including widening runway 09L/27R to 60 metres (196 ft 10 in)) and special taxiing procedures were established. On 14 November 2015, Emirates operated a one-time special flight with the A380 on its Dubai-São Paulo route to commemorate its eight years of operations in Brazil. On 26 March 2017, Emirates started daily A380 service from Dubai to São Paulo, replacing the Boeing 777-300ER previously used on that route – coincidentally, on the same day that the other UAE airline, Etihad, ended its services to São Paulo.

== Facilities ==
=== Runways and taxiways ===
GRU has two parallel runways. Runway 10R/28L is 3,000 metres (9,843 ft) long and 45 metres (148 ft) wide, while runway 10L/28R is 3,700 metres (12,140 ft) long and 60 metres (200 ft) wide, after being widened in 2015 to better receive the Airbus A380. The field elevation at the airport is 750 metres (2,459 ft) above mean sea level. Runway 10R/28L is mostly used for landings and runway 10L/28R for takeoffs. There are high-speed exit taxiways on both runways that allow for traffic to depart the runway at higher speed to allow better efficiency for landing and takeoff traffic. As of 2014, there was an average of 650 takeoff and landing operations per day at the airport.

=== Terminals ===
The airport has four passenger terminals, numbered 1, 2, and 3, according to their order along the airport access road when arriving from the city, plus a VIP terminal.

- Terminal 1 is the smallest and simplest. It handles only domestic flights and, as of January 2020, it is used only by Azul Brazilian Airlines. Terminal 1 has no jet bridges and no direct access to the other terminals, which can only be reached by a free shuttle bus.
- Terminal 2 is the oldest and largest, and for many years was the only airport terminal. It handles the majority of domestic flights and a few international flights. The terminal is undergoing a retrofit process in internal and external areas to modernize the facilities and to improve the user experience. This terminal is divided into two boarding piers:

- West Pier

The West Pier has sixteen jet bridges and it is used only by domestic flights.

- East Pier

The East Pier has thirteen jet bridges and it is used by domestic and international flights.

- Terminal 3 is the newest and most modern. It operates only international flights and concentrates most long-haul intercontinental traffic, in addition to LATAM Group's Latin American flights. It comprises a pier with twenty-two gates with jetways. Five of them can accommodate the Airbus A380.

- T3B Pier is a new pier being built to expand Terminal 3, with 14 jet bridges and three remote positions. Its completion is scheduled for the end of 2026.

According to information released by the authorities that manage the airport, after the inauguration of pier T3B, the east pier will be converted 100% for domestic flights, and a new domestic pier with ten boarding bridges, called T2L, will also be built after the west pier, with an expected opening in 2029.

Terminals 2 and 3 are directly linked by a walkway.

The airport also has a large air cargo terminal with a built area of 97,000 square metres (1,040,000 sq ft) and capable of handling any type of cargo, including refrigerated and hazardous shipments.

=== Navigational aids ===
There are two navigational aids that GRU traffic uses. The Bonsucesso very high frequency omnidirectional range with distance measuring equipment (VOR-DME) is located 9.1 kilometres; 5.6 miles (4.9 nmi) to the east of GRU.

== Developments ==
In 2009 Infraero unveiled a R$ 1,489.5 million (US$784.7 USD million; €549.8 EUR million) investment plan to upgrade Guarulhos International Airport, focusing on preparations for the 2014 FIFA World Cup and the Summer Olympics in 2016. The investment was supposed to be used as follows:

- Construction of additional taxiways. Cost: R$ 19M. Completion: April 2016.
- Enlargement of apron and taxiways. Cost: R$370,5M. Completion: May 2016.
- Construction of passenger Terminal 3. Cost: R$1,100M. Completed: March 2014. Opened for Star Alliance airlines in May.

Central to this investment plan was Terminal 3, which is projected to add 12 million passenger capacity to the 17 million of the existing two terminals. Plans for a third runway were decided to be "technically impracticable" and were cancelled in January 2008.

However, the former concessionary, Infraero, experienced many legal and bureaucratic difficulties, which prevented most (if any) of these improvements from being completed on schedule. As of April 2013, the new concessionary unveiled a new expansion project, which included the new Terminal 3 (with a different design than the one proposed by Infraero), the widening of the main runway in order to enable operations by the large Airbus A380 and Boeing 747-8, operated by Emirates and Lufthansa respectively, and several other improvements in the existing terminals and parking area.

The Terminal 3 is open and all Star Alliance airlines are in, as well as many other overseas carriers. International flights by LATAM also use the facility.

A train service development and construction has also been planned, however never concluded and cancelled. This included an Airport Express Line linking the airport to downtown São Paulo and a Rio–São Paulo high-speed rail connecting Guarulhos to Rio de Janeiro-Galeão and Campinas-Viracopos airports.

Since March 2017 American Airlines invested US$ 100 million on a 17,000 m^{2} (180,000 sq ft) maintenance hangar at Guarulhos Airport, building together with the LATAM Hangar of R$ 130 million. The American Airlines one is capable of performing line maintenance on two wide-body aircraft at the same time, of the types commonly used by the U.S. company on routes between São Paulo and the United States and the LATAM one is capable of performing line maintenance of one wide-body aircraft. It could also be used by other companies as storage for parts. The same conditions applies to the LATAM maintenance center.

== Airlines and destinations ==
=== Passenger ===
Airlines	Destinations
Aerolíneas Argentinas	Buenos Aires–Aeroparque, Mendoza, Salta; Seasonal: Punta del Este, San Carlos de Bariloche
Aeroméxico	Mexico City–Benito Juárez
Air Canada	Buenos Aires–Ezeiza, Montréal–Trudeau, Toronto–Pearson
Air China	Beijing–Capital, Madrid
Air Europa	Madrid
Air France	Paris–Charles de Gaulle
Air Peace	Lagos (begins 16 December 2026)
American Airlines	Dallas/Fort Worth, Miami, New York–JFK
Avianca	Bogotá
Arajet	Punta Cana
Azul Brazilian Airlines	Belo Horizonte–Confins, Cuiabá, Curitiba, Porto Alegre, Punta del Este, Recife, Rio de Janeiro–Santos Dumont; Seasonal: Maceió, Porto Seguro
Boliviana de Aviación	Santa Cruz de la Sierra–Viru Viru; Seasonal: Cochabamba
British Airways	London–Heathrow
Copa Airlines	Panama City–Tocumen
Delta Air Lines	Atlanta, New York–JFK
Emirates	Dubai–International
Ethiopian Airlines	Addis Ababa, Buenos Aires–Ezeiza
Gol Linhas Aéreas	Aracaju, Asunción, Belém, Belo Horizonte–Confins, Brasília, Buenos Aires–Aeroparque, Campo Grande, Caracas, Cascavel, Caxias do Sul, Chapecó, Cuiabá, Curitiba, Fernando de Noronha, Florianópolis, Fortaleza, Foz do Iguaçu, Goiânia, Jericoacoara, João Pessoa, Juazeiro do Norte, Maceió, Manaus, Maringá, Mendoza, Montevideo, Natal, Navegantes, Palmas (ends 31 January 2027), Passo Fundo, Petrolina, Porto Alegre, Porto Seguro, Punta Cana (ends 31 January 2027), Recife, Ribeirão Preto (ends 21 January 2027), Rio de Janeiro–Galeão, Salvador da Bahia, Santa Cruz de la Sierra–Viru Viru, São Luís, Sinop, Teresina (ends 30 January 2027), Uberlândia (ends 31 January 2027), Vitória, Vitória da Conquista; Seasonal: Córdoba (AR), El Calafate (begins 26 November 2026), Punta del Este, Rosario, San Carlos de Bariloche, Ushuaia
Iberia	Madrid
ITA Airways	Rome–Fiumicino
KLM	Amsterdam
LATAM Brasil	Amsterdam, Aracaju, Barcelona, Belém, Belo Horizonte–Confins, Boa Vista, Bogotá, Bonito, Boston, Brasília, Brussels, Buenos Aires–Aeroparque, Buenos Aires–Ezeiza, Cabo Frio (begins 3 December 2026), Caldas Novas, Campo Grande, Cape Town, Cascavel, Caxias do Sul, Chapecó, Córdoba (AR), Cuiabá, Curitiba, Dourados, Fernando de Noronha, Florianópolis, Fortaleza, Foz do Iguaçu, Frankfurt, Geneva (begins 1 April 2027), Goiânia, Ilhéus, Imperatriz, Jaguaruna Jericoacoara, Ji-Paraná (begins 7 December 2026), João Pessoa, Johannesburg–O. R. Tambo, Joinville, Juazeiro do Norte, Juiz de Fora, Lima, Lisbon, London–Heathrow, Londrina, Los Angeles, Macaé (begins 15 February 2027), Macapá, Maceió, Madrid, Manaus, Maringá, Mendoza, Mexico City–Benito Juárez, Miami, Milan–Malpensa, Montes Claros, Montevideo, Natal, Navegantes, New York–JFK, Orlando, Palmas, Paris–Charles de Gaulle, Passo Fundo, Pelotas, Petrolina, Porto Alegre, Porto Seguro, Porto Velho, Punta Cana, Recife, Ribeirão Preto, Rio Branco, Rio de Janeiro–Galeão, Rio de Janeiro–Santos Dumont, Rome–Fiumicino, Rondonópolis (begins 14 December 2026), Rosario, Salvador da Bahia, Santiago de Chile, São José do Rio Preto, São Luís, Sinop, Teresina, Uberaba, Uberlândia, Vitória, Vitória da Conquista; Seasonal: San Carlos de Bariloche, Ushuaia
LATAM Chile	Santiago de Chile
LATAM Colombia	Bogotá
LATAM Paraguay	Asunción
LATAM Perú	Cusco (begins 29 March 2027), Lima
Lufthansa	Frankfurt, Munich
Qatar Airways	Doha
Royal Air Maroc	Casablanca
Sky Airline	Santiago de Chile; Seasonal: San Carlos de Bariloche
Sky Airline Peru	Lima
South African Airways	Cape Town, Johannesburg–O. R. Tambo
Swiss International Air Lines	Buenos Aires–Ezeiza, Zürich
TAAG Angola Airlines	Luanda–Agostinho Neto
TAP Air Portugal	Lisbon, Porto
Turkish Airlines	Buenos Aires–Ezeiza, Istanbul, Santiago de Chile
United Airlines	Chicago–O'Hare, Houston–Intercontinental, Newark, Washington–Dulles
WestJet	Seasonal: Calgary (begins 15 December 2026)

=== Cargo ===
Airlines	Destinations
Atlas Air	Los Angeles, Miami, Quito, Santiago de Chile
Ethiopian Cargo	Chongqing, Xiamen
Gol Linhas Aéreas	Fortaleza, São Luís, Teresina
LATAM Cargo Brasil	Manaus
Total Express	Manaus

== Statistics ==
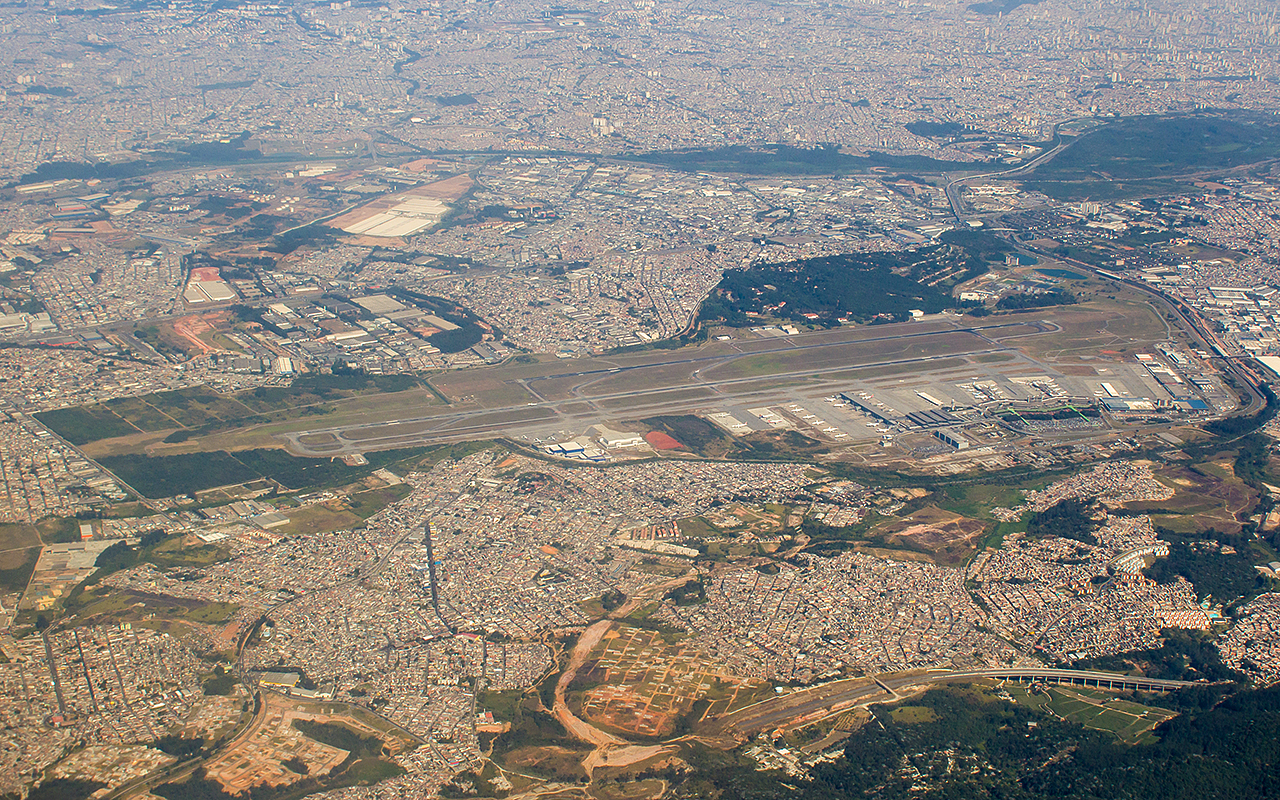
Air view in 2022

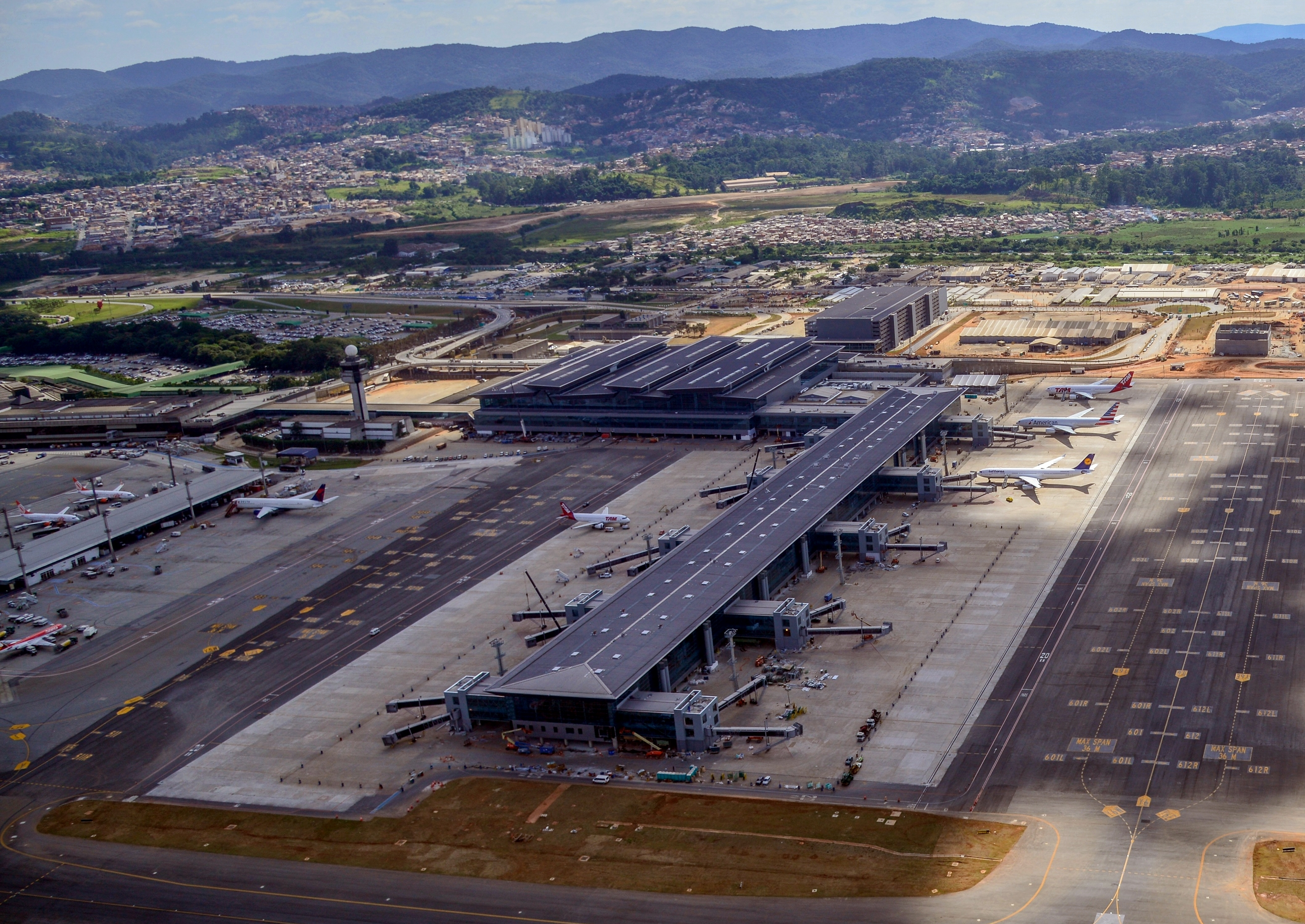
Terminal 3 in 2014

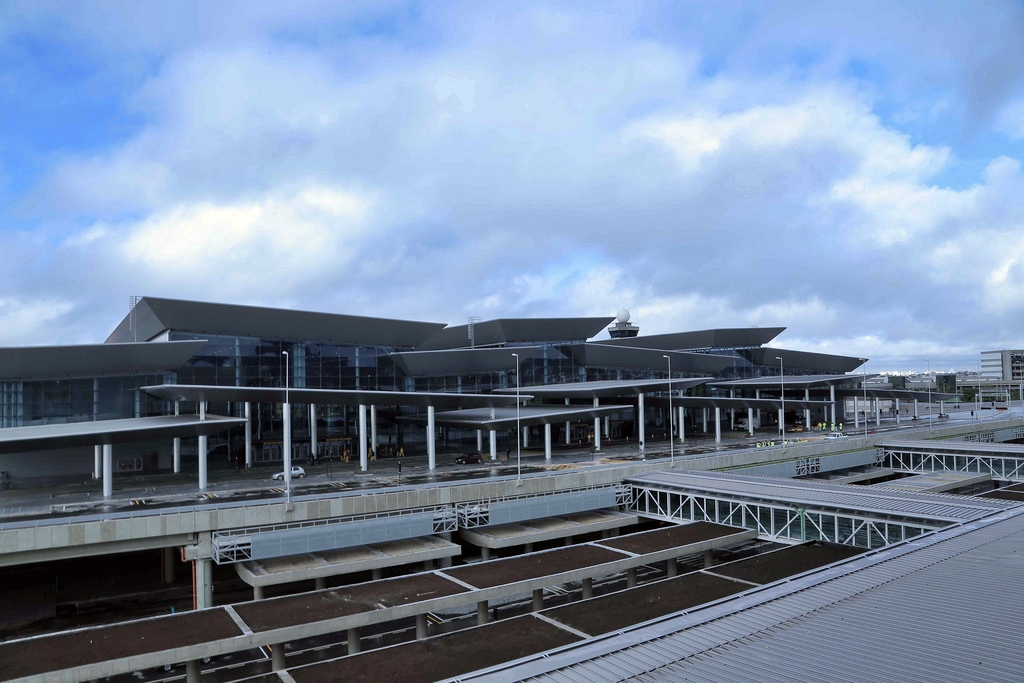
Terminal 3 landside in 2014

Following are the number of passenger, aircraft and cargo movements at the airport, according to Infraero (2007-2012) and GRU Airport (2013-2025) reports:

Year	Passenger	Aircraft	Cargo (t)
2025	47,188,085 ▲8%	305,188 ▲6%	
2024	43,580,962 ▲6%	288,063 ▲5%	
2023	41,307,915 ▲20%	274,917 ▲13%	
2022	34,480,706 ▲43%	242,881 ▲29%	
2021	24,170,612 ▲19%	188,573 ▲21%	
2020	20,322,520 ▼53%	155,912 ▼47%	
2019	43,002,119 ▲2%	291,987	
2018	42,230,309 ▲12%	293,084 ▲10%	
2017	37,765,898 ▲3%	266,016 ▼1%	
2016	36,606,363 ▼6%	268,139 ▼43%	
2015	38,983,779 ▼1%	296,618 ▼3%	
2014	39,539,992 ▲10%	306,050 ▲8%	
2013	35,962,128 ▲10%	284,184 ▲4%	
2012	32,777,330 ▲9%	273,884 ▲1%	474,190 ▼7%
2011	30,003,428 ▲12%	270,600 ▲8%	511,484 ▲19%
2010	26,849,185 ▲24%	250,493 ▲19%	430,850 ▲13%
2009	21,727,649 ▲7%	209,636 ▲8%	382,723 ▼19%
2008	20,400,304 ▲9%	194,184 ▲3%	475,209 ▼3%
2007	18,795,596	187,960	488,485

Busiest International Routes from GRU Airport (2024)
Rank	Airport	Passengers	Change 2023 / 24
1.	Santiago de Chile	1,499,136	▲32,59%
2.	Buenos Aires–Aeroparque	1,109,987	▲13,58%
3.	Miami	869,266	▲10,84%
4.	Lisbon	850,619	▲18,37%
5.	Madrid	833,720	▲26,31%
6.	Paris–Charles de Gaulle	602,214	▲4,37%
7.	Panama	562,077	▲1,3%
8.	Bogotá	546,416	▲17,22%
9.	New York	527,486	▲0,67%
10.	Lima	526,131	▲38,19%
11.	Rome	521,018	▲48,69%
12.	Frankfurt	504,597	▼0,03%
13.	London	501,357	▲4,62%
14.	Buenos Aires–Ezeiza	410,546	▼12,88%
15.	Montevideo	397,025	▼2,98%
16.	Doha	391,330	▼4,54%
17.	Atlanta	353,162	▲15,34%
18.	Dubai	297,923	▼10,27%
19.	Mexico City	297,847	▲9,33%
20.	Asunción	263,927	▲15,56%

== Accidents and incidents ==
- On 28 January 1986, a VASP Boeing 737-2A1 registered PP-SME flying from Guarulhos to Belo Horizonte unknowingly tried to take-off from Guarulhos, during foggy conditions, from a taxiway. The take-off was aborted, but the aircraft overran, collided with a dyke and broke in two. One passenger died.
- On 21 March 1989, a Transbrasil Cargo Boeing 707-349C registered PT-TCS operating Flight 801, flying from Manaus to São Paulo-Guarulhos, crashed at the district of Vila Barros in Guarulhos, shortly before touch-down at runway 09R. That day, at 12:00, the runway was going to be closed for maintenance and the crew decided to speed up procedures to touch-down before closure (it was already 11:54). In a hurry, one of the crew members, by mistake, activated the air-dynamic brakes, and the aircraft lost too much speed to have enough aerodynamic support (resulting in a stall). As a consequence the aircraft crashed approximately 2 kilometres (1.2 mi) from the airport. There were 25 fatalities, of which three were crew members and 22 were civilians on the ground. As well as the 22 fatalities, there were over 200 injured on the ground.
- On 2 March 1996, a Madrid Táxi Aéreo Gates Learjet 25D registered PT-LSD transporting the Brazilian band Mamonas Assassinas crashed into Cantareira mountain range, located north of the airport, at 23:16 local time killing all 9 passengers on board including the band themselves. The aircraft was returning home after attended a show in Brasília, it was on final approach to land on the runway 09R, but went around. As it flew toward the runway for a second attempt to land, the ATC instructed the pilots to make a right turn heading south, but they turned north (left) and crashed into the mountain range at 3,300 feet (1,000 m), 10.0 kilometres (6.2 mi) from the airport. Ironically, all band members were from a Guarulhos neighborhood located close to the airport.
- On 14 September 2002, a Total Linhas Aéreas ATR42-312 registered PT-MTS on a cargo flight between São Paulo-Guarulhos and Londrina crashed while en route near Paranapanema. The crew of 2 died.
- 9 November 2024: Total Linhas Aéreas Flight 5682, a Boeing 737-400SF registered as PS-TLB, flying from Eurico de Aguiar Salles Airport in Vitória, made an emergency landing at the airport, with a fire in the cargo hold. Shortly after landing, the fire spread rapidly to the rear section. The pilots evacuated quickly and there were no injuries. The aircraft was a total loss due to the severe fire.

== Ground transport ==
The airport is located 25 km (16 mi) from downtown São Paulo.

=== Train ===
The airport is adjacent to Aeroporto-Guarulhos, a station on Line 13-Jade, operated by CPTM. This line started its operations on 31 March 2018. That makes São Paulo's São Paulo/Guarulhos International Airport (GRU) the first among major South American airport hubs (such as Buenos Aires-Ezeiza, Santiago de Chile, Lima, Bogotá, and Rio de Janeiro-Galeão) to have a direct railway connection.

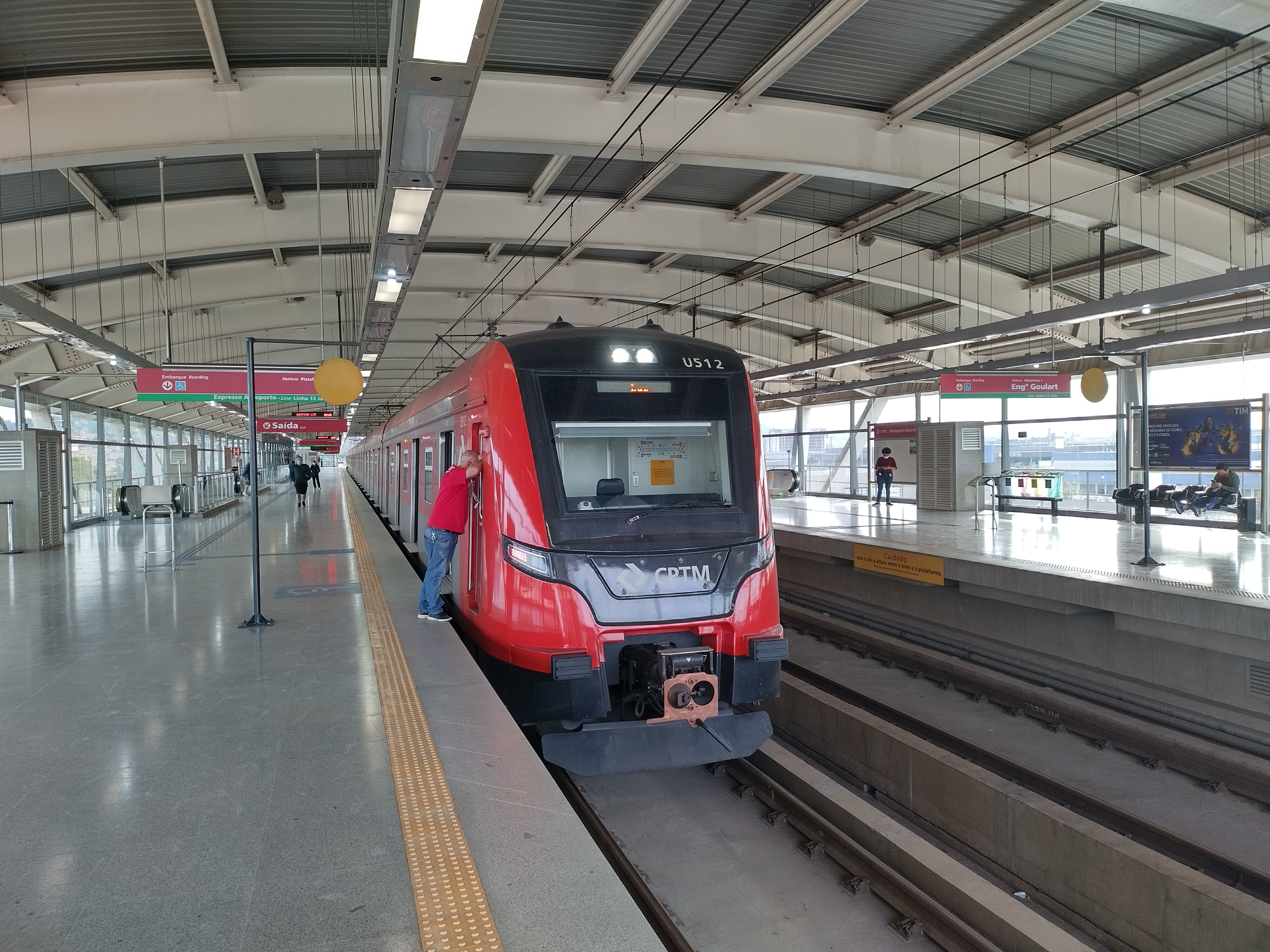
Airport Metro Station in GRU

Since December 2020, an Airport Express service, from Luz station to Aeroporto-Guarulhos, departs from each terminus every hour. It attends only one station towards Aeroporto-Guarulhos (Guarulhos-CECAP station), and 2 stations towards Luz (Guarulhos-CECAP and Brás). Since September 2023, the Airport Express was extended to Palmeiras-Barra Funda.

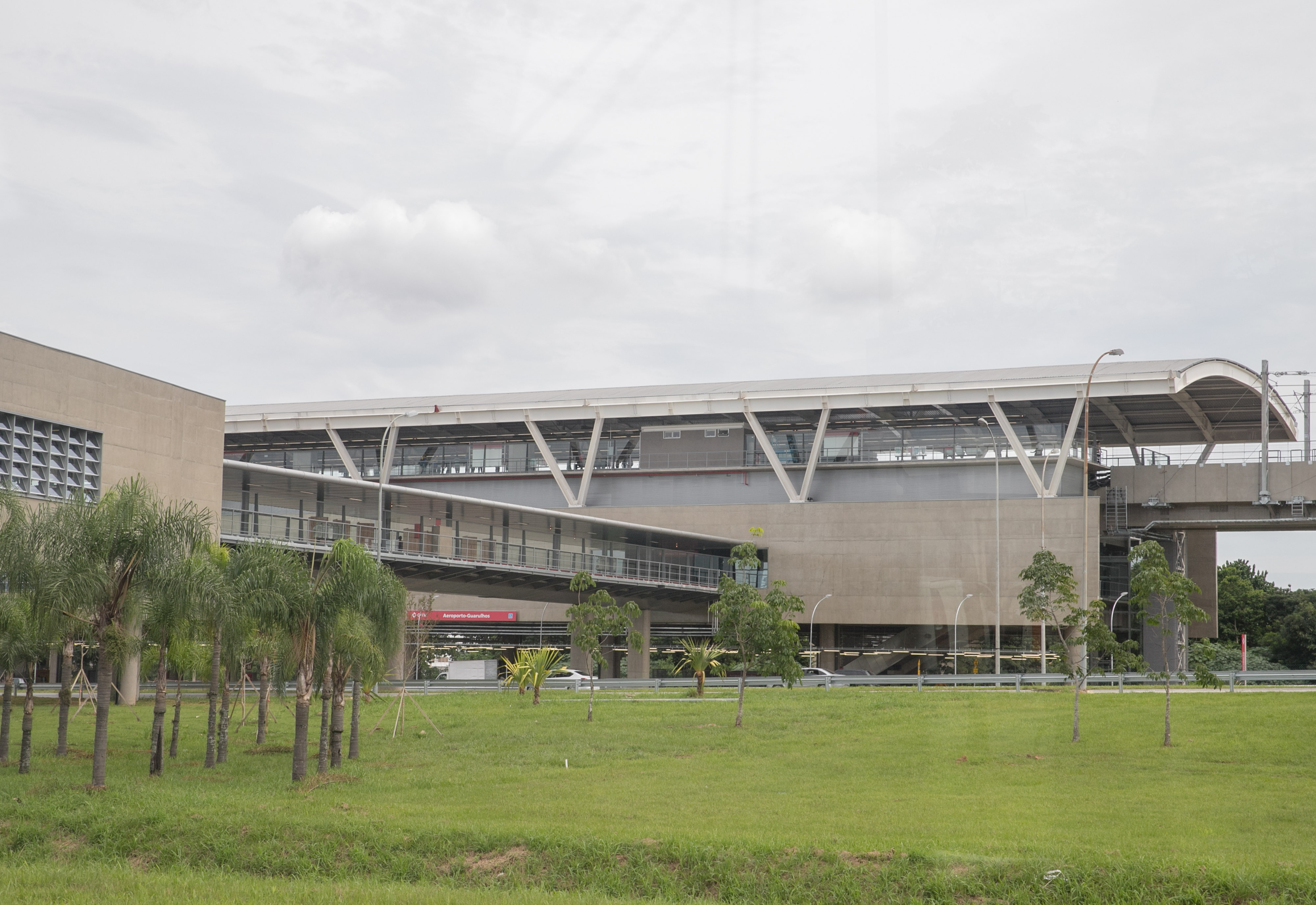
Guarulhos Airport Train Station

Aeroporto-Guarulhos station is located near Terminal 1, the smallest and least busy of Guarulhos Airport's terminals. Passengers can access Terminal 1, Terminal 2 and Terminal 3 via the free GRU Airport People Mover.

=== Bus ===
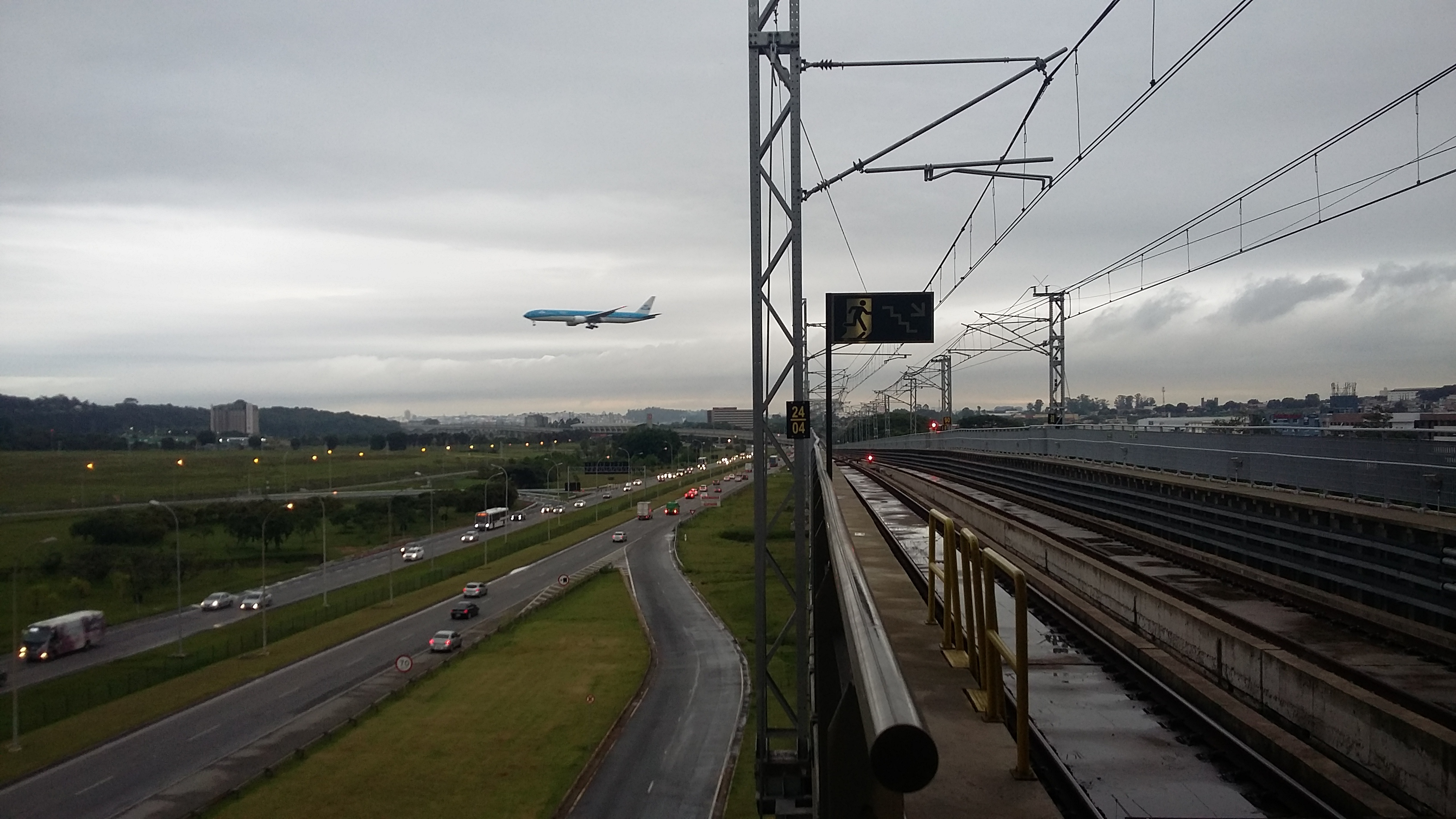
View of Hélio Smidt Highway and Line 13 (CPTM) around Guarulhos

Bus transportation is available through the Airport Bus Service, an executive bus line, administered by EMTU and operated by Consórcio Internorte – Área 3. This service provides transportation connecting Guarulhos to Congonhas airport; to Tietê Bus Terminal; to Palmeiras-Barra Funda Intermodal Terminal, to Faria Lima Ave; To Republica Square (Praça da República); To Berrini Ave., Itaim Bibi district; and to the circuit of hotels along Paulista Avenue and Rua Augusta. The ride takes about one hour, depending on traffic. At the airport, tickets can be purchased at the counter located outside the lounge of the Terminal 1, Wing B's arrivals level.

Pássaro Marron/EMTU, a syndicate of the Internorte Consortium, offers two regular bus lines, 257 and 299, connecting Tatuapé subway station (Line 3-Red) with Guarulhos Airport every 30 minutes. At Tatuapé, both buses can be picked up on a platform of that multimodal station's North side bus terminal. At the airport, the stop for both buses is at the Arrivals level road connecting the wings of Terminal 2.

Gol Airlines and LATAM offer for their passengers free bus transfers between Guarulhos and Congonhas airports at regular times.

Viação Cometa offers daily departures to and from the airport and the cities of Santos, Sorocaba, São Vicente, and Praia Grande. Lirabus operates daily buses between the airport and Campinas. Pássaro Marron offers bus services to São José dos Campos with departures every two hours. Viação Transdutra connects the airport with the city of Arujá.

=== Car ===
The airport has its own highway system: The Rodovia Hélio Smidt Highway which connects the airport to the Presidente Dutra Highway or the Ayrton Senna Highway. Residents of Guarulhos can access the road via Monteiro Lobato Avenue.

== See also ==
- List of airports in Brazil
