= Guarulhos-CECAP (CPTM) =

Railway station in São Paulo, Brazil

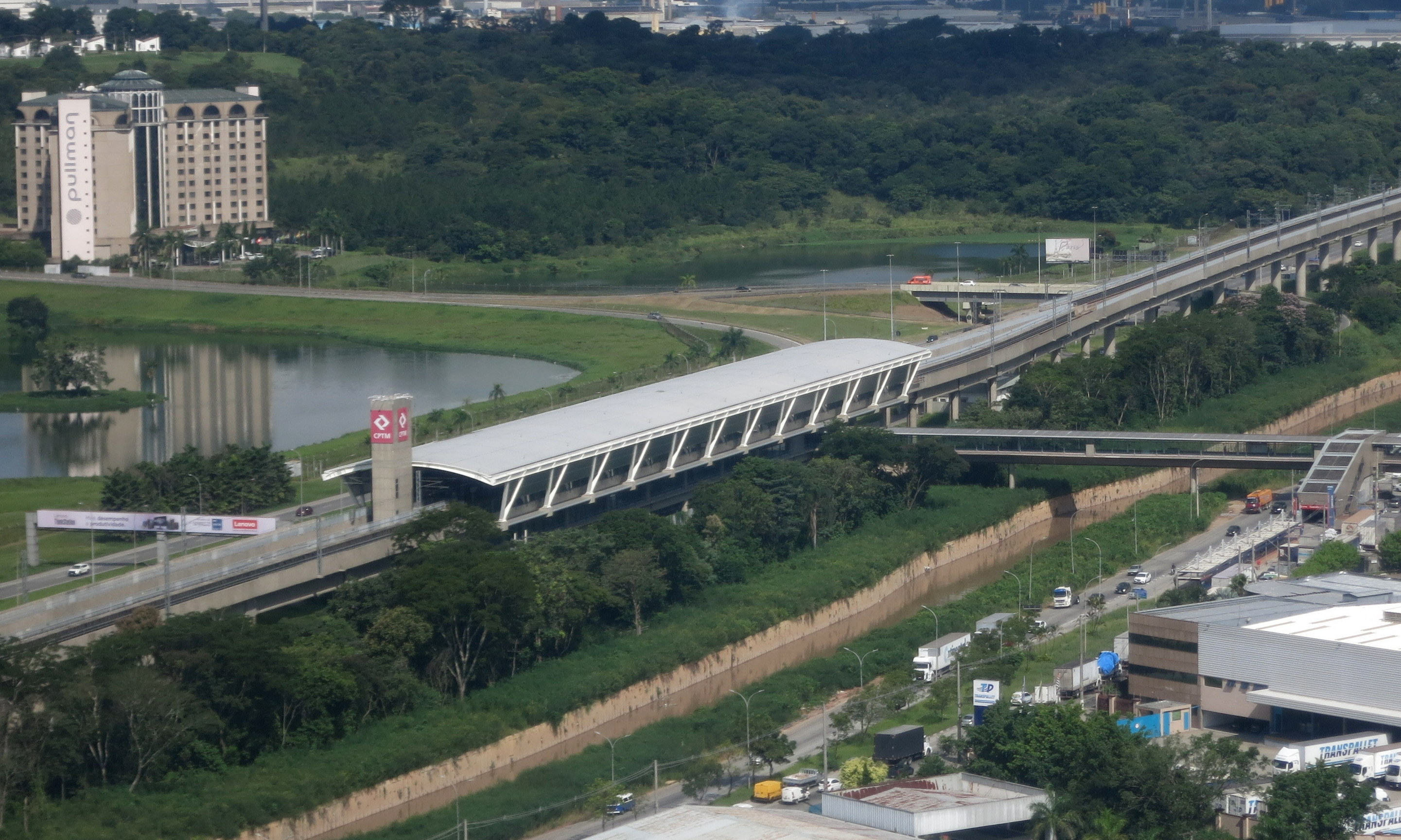
- Guarulhos-CECAP station viewed from the air

General information
- Location: Rodovia Hélio Smidt, Km 3 Cecap; Brazil
- Coordinates: 23.448611°S 46.493333°W
- Owner: Government of the State of São Paulo
- Operator: CPTM
- Platforms: Island platform
- Connections: Guarulhos Road Terminal; Guarulhos–São Paulo Metropolitan Corridor

Construction
- Structure type: Elevated
- Accessible: y

Other information
- Station code: GRC

History
- Opened: March 31, 2018
- Former names: Zezinho Magalhães; CECAP

Services
Preceding station	São Paulo Metropolitan Trains	Following station
Engenheiro Goulart Terminus	Line 13	Aeroporto–Guarulhos Terminus
Luz towards Palmeiras-Barra Funda	Line 13-Airport Express	Aeroporto–Guarulhos Terminus
Brás towards Palmeiras-Barra Funda	Line 13-Airport Express	Aeroporto–Guarulhos Terminus
Track layout
Location

Guarulhos-CECAP is a train station on CPTM Line 13-Jade, located in the district of Cecap in Guarulhos, Brazil. It is located by the Km 3 of Rodovia Hélio Smidt, next to Parque Cecap. It has a connection with Guarulhos Road Terminal.

== Characteristics ==
It is an elevated station with a connection mezzanine on the lower level and an island platform on the upper level. The station is constructed of concrete and metallic alloys. The main access is through a catwalk with connects the station to the Guarulhos Road Terminal and the EMTU Metropolitan Corridor. It has capacity for 70,000 passengers per day.
