= Aeroporto–Guarulhos (CPTM) =

Railway station in São Paulo, Brazil

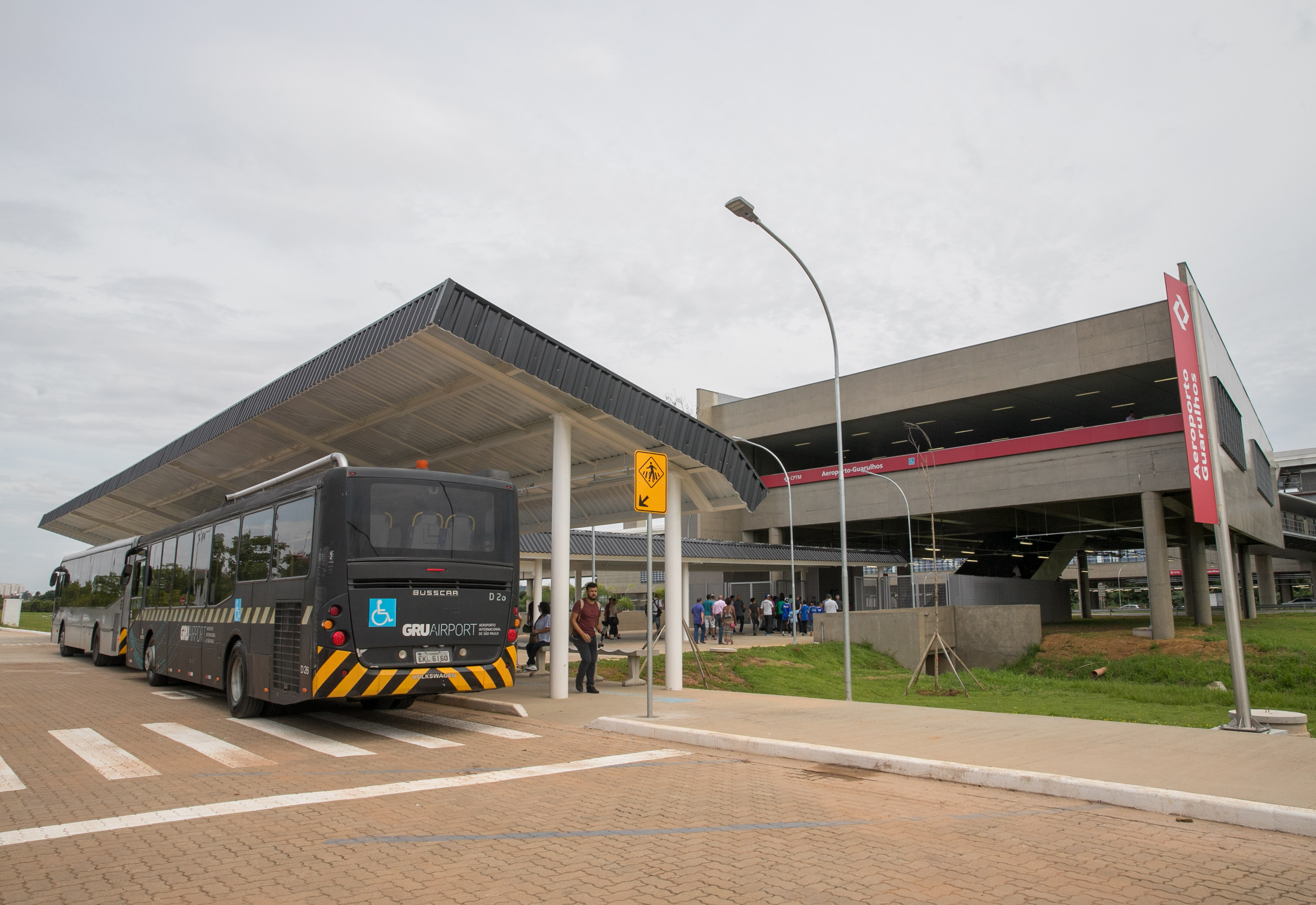

General information
- Location: Av. Marginal do Rio Baquirivu, 3000; Parque Cecap; Brazil
- Coordinates: 23.433056°S 46.493056°W
- Owner: Government of the State of São Paulo
- Operator: CPTM
- Platforms: Side platforms
- Connections: Airport Express; GRU Airport People Mover; Taboão Metropolitan Terminal; Guarulhos–São Paulo Metropolitan Corridor

Construction
- Structure type: Elevated
- Accessible: Yes

Other information
- Station code: GRC

History
- Opened: March 31, 2018
- Former names: Aeroporto de Guarulhos; Aeroporto

Services
| Preceding station | São Paulo Metropolitan Trains | Following station |
|---|---|---|
| Guarulhos-CECAP towards Engenheiro Goulart | Line 13 | Terminus |
| Guarulhos-CECAP towards Palmeiras-Barra Funda | Line 13-Airport Express | Terminus |
| Preceding station | São Paulo Metro | Following station |
| Terminus | GRU Airport People Mover | Terminal 1 towards Terminal 3 |
Track layout
Location

Aeroporto–Guarulhos is a train station on CPTM Line 13-Jade, located in the district of Parque Cecap in Guarulhos. It has connections with the North EMTU Corridor, through Taboão Bus Terminal, and with the Governor André Franco Montoro Airport.

The station is adjacent to the GRU Airport People Mover, connecting passengers with Terminal 1, Terminal 2 and Terminal 3.

== Characteristics ==
The station is elevated with a concourse on the lower level and two side platforms on the upper level. There are eight escalators between both levels. Elevated walkways connect bus and car parking to the station. The site has a total area of 21,762 square metres (234,240 sq ft).
