= SP-19 (São Paulo highway) =

State highway in São Paulo, Brazil

SP-019

Route information
- Length: 2.400 km (1.491 mi)

Location
- Country: Brazil
- State: São Paulo

Highway system
- Highways in Brazil; Federal; São Paulo State Highways

The Hélio Smidt Highway (SP-19) is entirely located within the city of Guarulhos, connecting the Ayrton Senna Highway to the Cumbica International Airport, passing through the neighborhoods of Várzea do Palácio, Cidade Satélite de Cumbica, Parque CECAP, and Taboão.

== Highway description ==
It is a state axis highway. The highway has four lanes throughout its entire length. It is managed by Ecopistas between kilometers 0.00 and 2.40, and by the Guarulhos Airport concessionaire between kilometers 2.41 and 5.00.

With the construction of the northern section of the Rodoanel Mário Covas, the highway is expected to be extended by 4 km to connect with the ring road system.

The highway experiences heavy traffic from people traveling to the airport, either for flights or work, as well as from military personnel stationed at the São Paulo Air Force Base. It is used by public transport for access to Ayrton Senna and the airport, although private transport predominates.

Due to being a high-speed thoroughfare with triple or quadruple lanes, speed limits range from 80 to 90 km/h.

Although located within Guarulhos, it is not integrated into the urban fabric: on the left (toward the airport) lies the Baquirivu-Guaçu River, and on the right is the Air Force Base – creating a sort of urban gap.

Some measures have restricted public access to the highway, such as the closure of a bridge connecting Jardim Malvinas to the road.

== Intersections ==
It intersects with the Ayrton Senna Highway (SP-070) at kilometer 1, and with the Presidente Dutra Highway (formerly SP-060, currently the Rio–São Paulo stretch of BR-116) at kilometer 2. It provides access to Avenida Monteiro Lobato and the Aeroporto–Guarulhos Station and Guarulhos-CECAP Station of Line 13–Jade of the São Paulo Metropolitan Trains.

== Legislation ==
With the construction of the Cumbica International Airport, it became necessary to build a connection between the airport and surrounding regional highways.

The highway was originally built by Desenvolvimento Rodoviário S.A. (DERSA), a state-run road development agency, and was managed by it until around 2006, when it was transferred to Ecopistas (Ayrton Senna and Hélio Smidt concession) and Infraero, later transitioning to GRU Airport when the airport was privatized.

In 1990, Governor Orestes Quércia issued a decree, and in 1991, Governor Luiz Antônio Fleury Filho enacted a law officially naming the highway after the recently deceased president-founder of Varig.

== Concessionaires and services ==
EcoPistas manages the stretch from km 0.00 to 2.40. The GRU Airport concessionaire, operated by Invepar and ACSA, manages the segment from km 2.41 to 5.00.

The concessionaires do not offer services such as Basic Assistance Units, police posts, online cameras, speed radars, service yards, weigh stations, or toll plazas. Enforcement is carried out by the Federal Highway Police.

== Physical condition (as of Dec/2018) ==
The highway's pavement is in good condition, with low roughness and no significant plastic deformation. Horizontal and vertical signage is well preserved.

== Projects ==
With the completion of the northern section of the Rodoanel Mário Covas, the highway will be extended by 4 kilometers to connect with the ring road system, improving access to the Metropolitan Region of São Paulo.

== See also ==
- List of state highways in São Paulo
