= GRU Airport People Mover =

Transit system in São Paulo, Brazil

GRU Airport People Mover (aeroGRU)

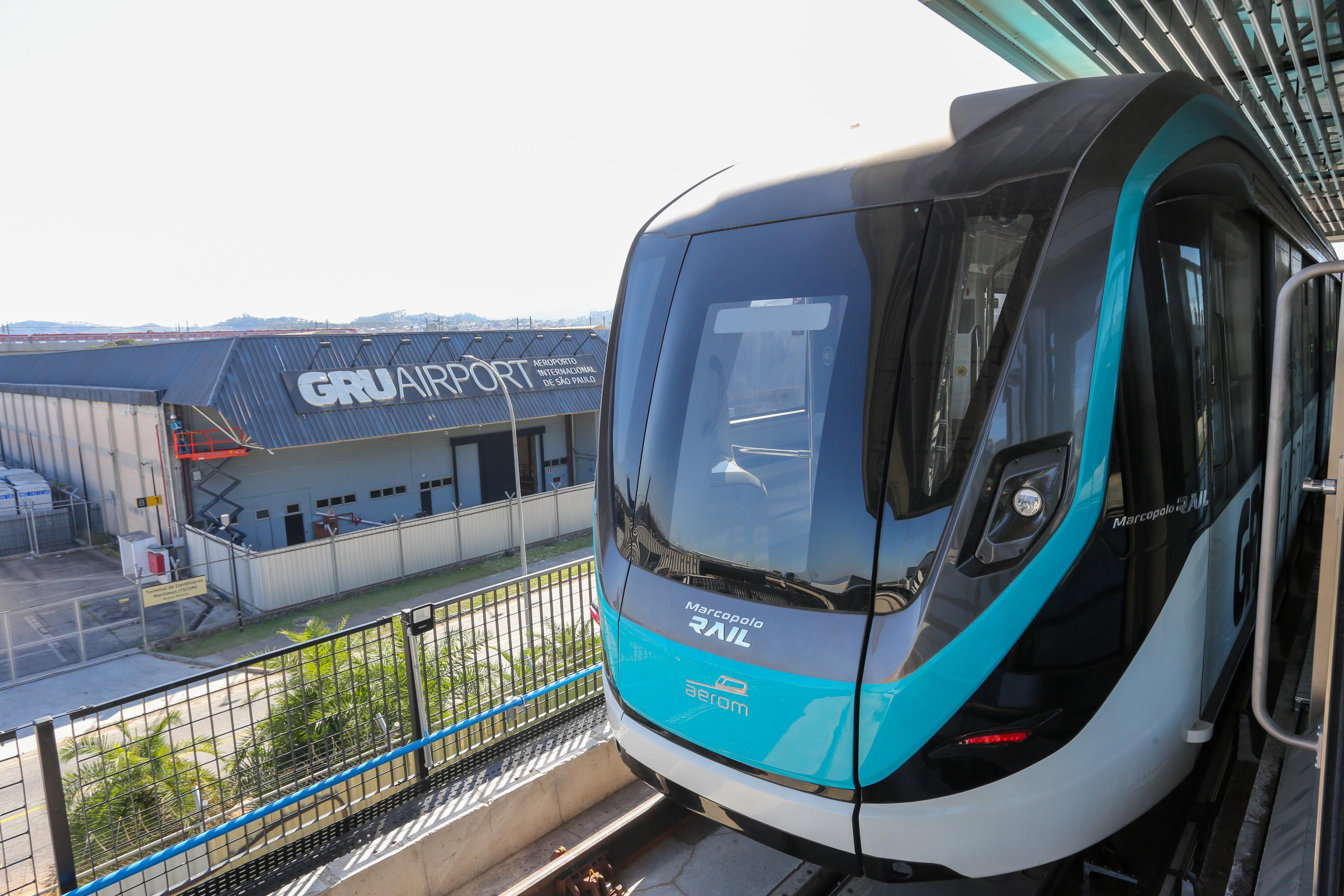

Overview
- Status: Operating
- Owner: GRU Airport
- Locale: Guarulhos, Brazil
- Termini: Aeroporto-Guarulhos; Terminal 3
- Stations: 4
- Website: www.aerogru.com.br

Service
- Type: People mover/airport rail link
- System: São Paulo Metro
- Operator: GRU Airport
- Rolling stock: 6 Marcopolo Rail Auster A-200 (3 trains)

History
- Commenced: 2022
- Opened: 20 February 2026
- Completed: 2025

Technical
- Line length: 2.7 km (1.7 mi)
- Character: Elevated atmospheric railway
- Track gauge: 1,600 mm (5 ft 3 in)
- Signalling: Siemens ATC

The GRU Airport People Mover is a people mover at the São Paulo/Guarulhos International Airport to connect the nearby CPTM railway station to the airport's terminals.

This line is approximately 2.6 km (1.6 mi) long and has 4 stations, beginning at the Aeroporto-Guarulhos station (with connection to Line 13-Jade) and continuing to separate stations at each of the three terminals.

Expression of interest were first invited in August 2019.

During the opening of the second access on Oscar Freire station, Governor João Doria affirmed that the dealership would have a deadline of 18 months to build the line and was opening scheduled for December 2021.

In November 2020, the Ministry of Infrastructure signed an authorization term sent to the National Civil Aviation Agency, allowing the construction of the line.

In the end of January 2021, the State Secretary of Metropolitan Transports, Alexandre Baldy, announced that the Federal Court of Accounts had approved the people mover project. The order of service, to authorize the beginning of the construction was expected to be signed in the second half of March 2021 by the Ministry of Infrastructure and the Secretariat of Civil Aviation, with a deadline of 18 months.

International companies, such as German Siemens, Canadian Bombardier, Chinese BYD and CRRC Sifang, Korean Rotem and Mexican Modutram, showed interest in the project, according to Folha de S. Paulo. In December 2020 it was announced that Brazilian firm Aerom, which owns the Aeromovel technology, had been selected to install the system. Construction was due to begin in January 2021 with completing in 2022. In June 2021 it was announced that the project had 'advanced' but a schedule for construction had not been finalised. The same company installed the Metro-Airport Connection which connect the nearby railway station to the Salgado Filho International Airport in Porto Alegre.

On 8 September 2021, Minister of Infrastructure Tarcísio de Freitas signed the contract for the construction of the people mover, with operation estimated to 2024.

After signing the contract, construction began in June 2022, with completion estimated at the end of 2024.

The line opened to airport employees on 3 December 2025.

The line opened to the public on 20 February 2026.

Map of the GRU Airport People Mover

== See also ==
- Line 13 (CPTM)
- São Paulo/Guarulhos International Airport
- Metro-Airport Connection
