= Engenheiro Goulart (CPTM) =

Railway station in São Paulo, Brazil

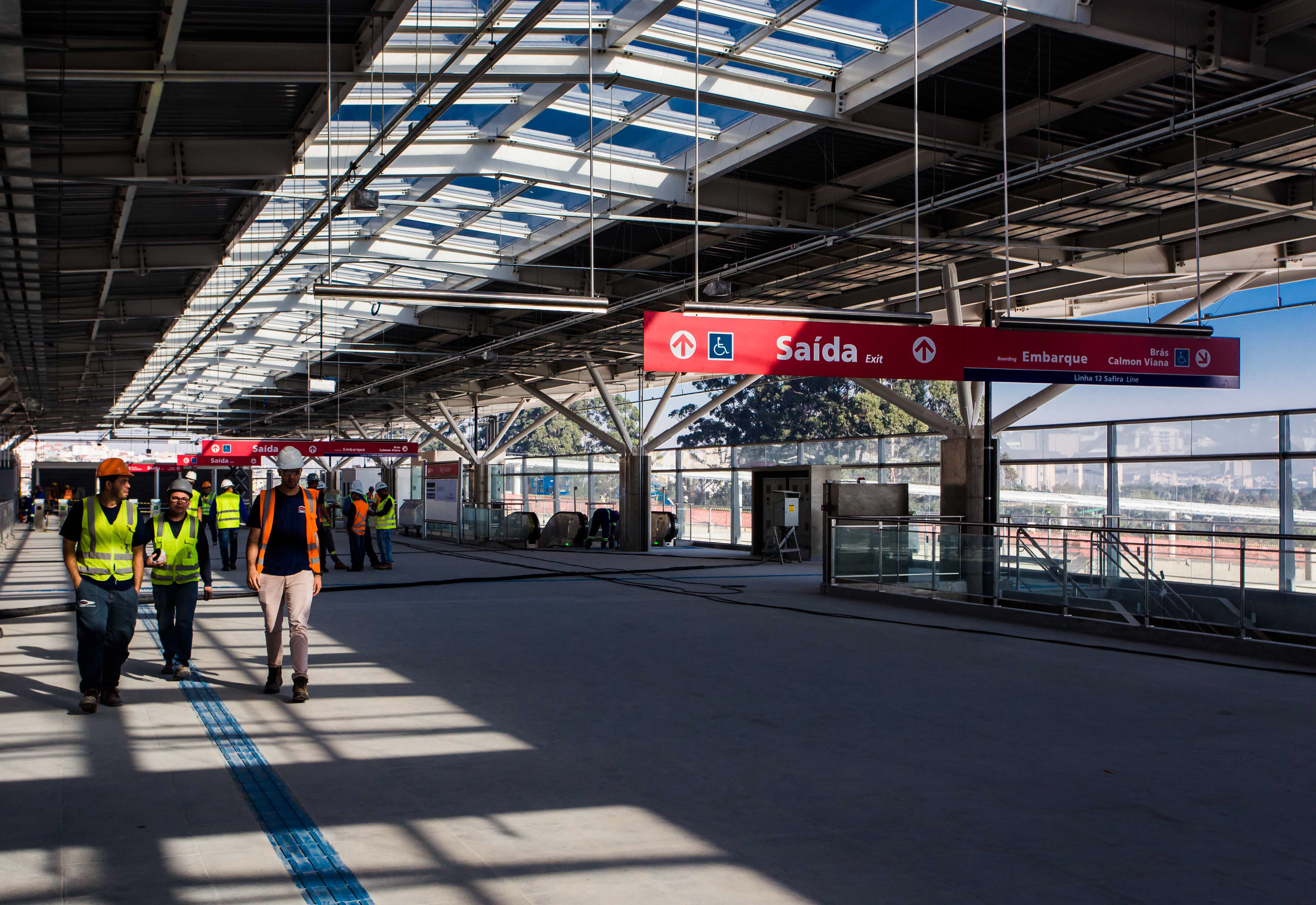
- Station in reconstruction, 2017.

General information
- Location: Av. Dr. Assis Ribeiro, 3500; Cangaíba; Brazil
- Coordinates: 23.498056°S 46.52°W
- Owner: Government of the State of São Paulo
- Operator: CPTM
- Platforms: Island platforms

Construction
- Structure type: At-grade
- Architect: Luiz Carlos Esteves

Other information
- Station code: EGO

History
- Opened: 1 January 1934; 31 March 2018
- Closed: 23 June 2014
- Rebuilt: 4 August 2017

Services
Preceding station	São Paulo Metropolitan Trains	Following station
Tatuapé towards Brás	Line 12	USP Leste towards Calmon Viana
Terminus	Line 13	Guarulhos-CECAP towards Aeroporto–Guarulhos
Track layout
Location

Engenheiro Goulart is a train station on CPTM Lines 12-Sapphire and 13-Jade.

The building of Engenheiro Goulart station is located in the same place as the old one, in Avenida Doutor Assis Ribeiro, 169, in the district of Cangaíba, East Side of São Paulo. The current building has more than 15,000 square metres (160,000 sq ft) of area and was officially opened on 4 August 2017, after 3 years of reconstruction. The original building was closed on 23 June 2014 and totally reconstructed, because of the Line 13-Jade construction, which has this station as terminus since 31 March 2018.

== History ==
Engenheiro Goulart station was opened on 1 January 1934, along with the EFCB Poá station. In 1959, two commuter trains crashed after the head of the station authorized the departure of UP-237, which should wait for the passage of UP-240 on the station. Because of that, at 6:20pm on 5 June 1959, both trains collided at 800 metres (2,600 ft) from the station, killing 50 passengers and leaving other 120 wounded.

The station was reconstructed by RFFSA in 1970. Since 1994, it is operated by CPTM. Between 2008 and 2009, the station was reformed, extending the coverage above the platforms. In 2014, it was closed and demolished, to be reconstructed for Lines 12-Sapphire and 13-Jade.

On 31 March 2018, the Line 13-Jade was opened, with the boarding of retinue of Governor Geraldo Alckmin, towards Aeroporto–Guarulhos station. Not all the trains of Line 13 stop on Engenheiro Goulart, as the Airport-Express service makes a route from Luz to Aeroporto–Guarulhos.

== Characteristics ==
Station constructed on surface with two adjacent island platforms. It has two access ramps, one of them connecting the station to Av. Doutor Assis Ribeiro, and another connecting the station to Tietê Ecological Park.
