= Line 13 (CPTM) =

CPTM Line 13 (Jade)
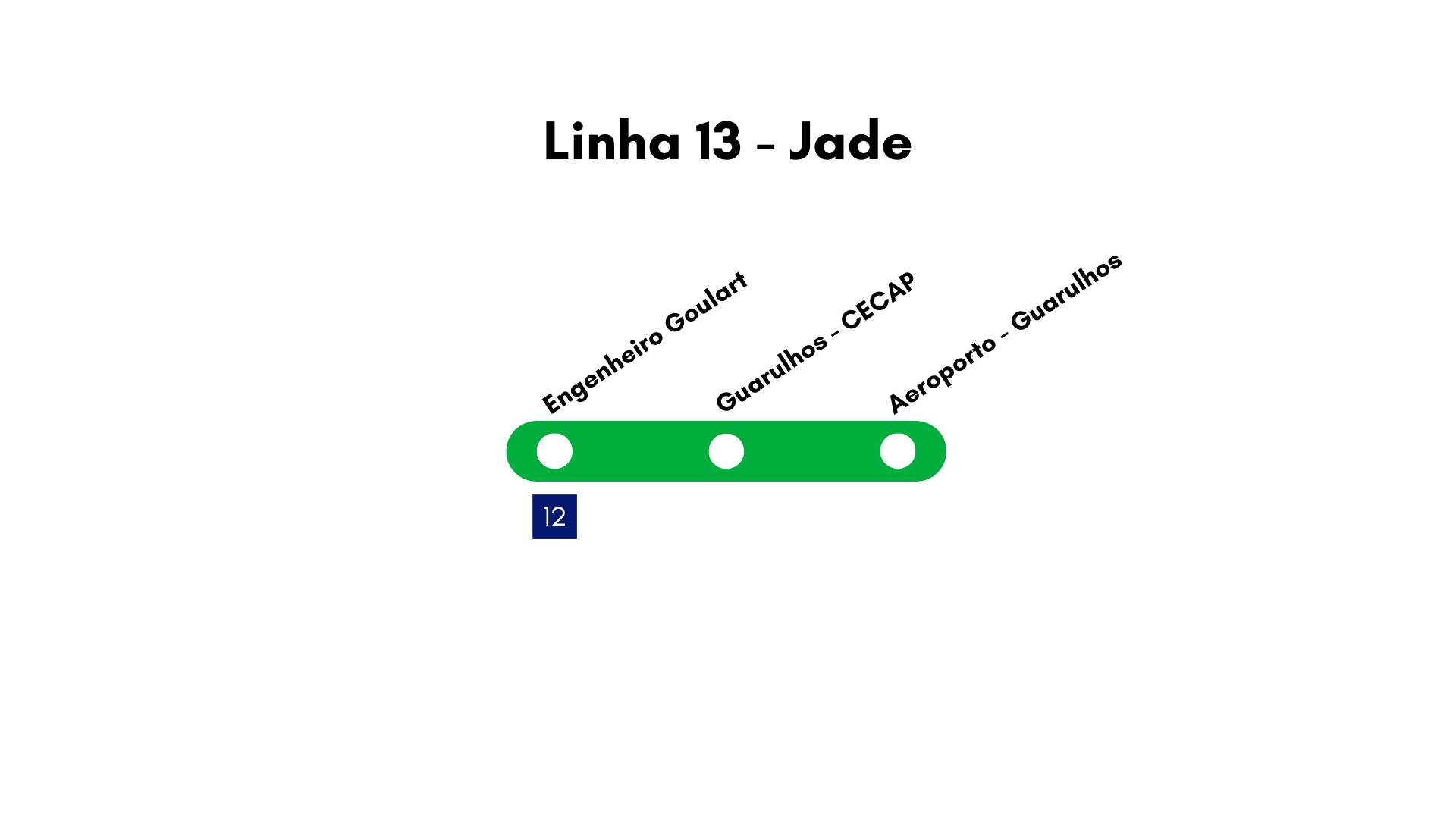
- Map of Line 13 - Jade

Overview
- Status: Opened
- Owner: Government of the State of São Paulo
- Locale: Greater São Paulo, Brazil
- Termini: Engenheiro Goulart; Aeroporto–Guarulhos
- Connecting lines: Current: GRU Airport People Mover; Planned:
- Stations: 3 (main line); 5 (Airport Express); 6 (in project)

Service
- Type: Commuter rail Airport rail link
- System: São Paulo Metropolitan Trains
- Services: Engenheiro Goulart ↔ Aeroporto–Guarulhos (Line 13); Palmeiras–Barra Funda ↔ Aeroporto–Guarulhos (Airport-Express)
- Operator: CPTM
- Depot: Presidente Altino rail yard
- Rolling stock: 64 CRRC Qingdao Sifang 2500 Series (8 trains)

History
- Opened: 31 March 2018; 8 years ago

Technical
- Line length: 12.2 km (7.6 mi)
- Track gauge: 1,600 mm (5 ft 3 in)
- Electrification: Overhead line, 3,000 V DC
- Operating speed: 90 km/h (56 mph)
- Signalling: CRSC FZL300 Automatic Train Control

Line 13 (Jade) (Portuguese: Linha 13–Jade), also known as the Guarulhos Train, is one of the thirteen lines that make up the São Paulo Metro Rail Transport Network and one of the five lines currently operated by CPTM. The route is 12.2 kilometres (7.6 mi) long with a total of 3 stations. It connects the Engenheiro Goulart Station in São Paulo to the Guarulhos Airport Station, in the city of Guarulhos.

Opened on March 31, 2018, it was the first line completely built and operated by CPTM. That makes São Paulo's São Paulo/Guarulhos International Airport (GRU) the first among major South American airport hubs (such as Buenos Aires-Ezeiza, Santiago de Chile, Lima, Bogotá, and Rio de Janeiro-Galeão) to have a direct railway connection. This contrasts with other large airports in the region, which to date still largely rely on buses or taxis to access rail/subway transport, or have railway connection projects still in the planning or construction phase.

== History ==
Work has been authorized on September 23, 2013, and was initially expected to be completed in 2015. The line finally opened in 2018.

The line was opened initially on a trial phase and operated only on Saturdays and Sundays from 10:00 to 15:00, with trains every 30 minutes to Engenheiro Goulart station in eastern São Paulo city, from where a further connection was necessary to reach downtown and the main business areas. Service was expanded in May 2018 to seven days a week, still only from 10:00 to 15:00. Full service from 4:00 to 24:00 was expanded in late June 2018.

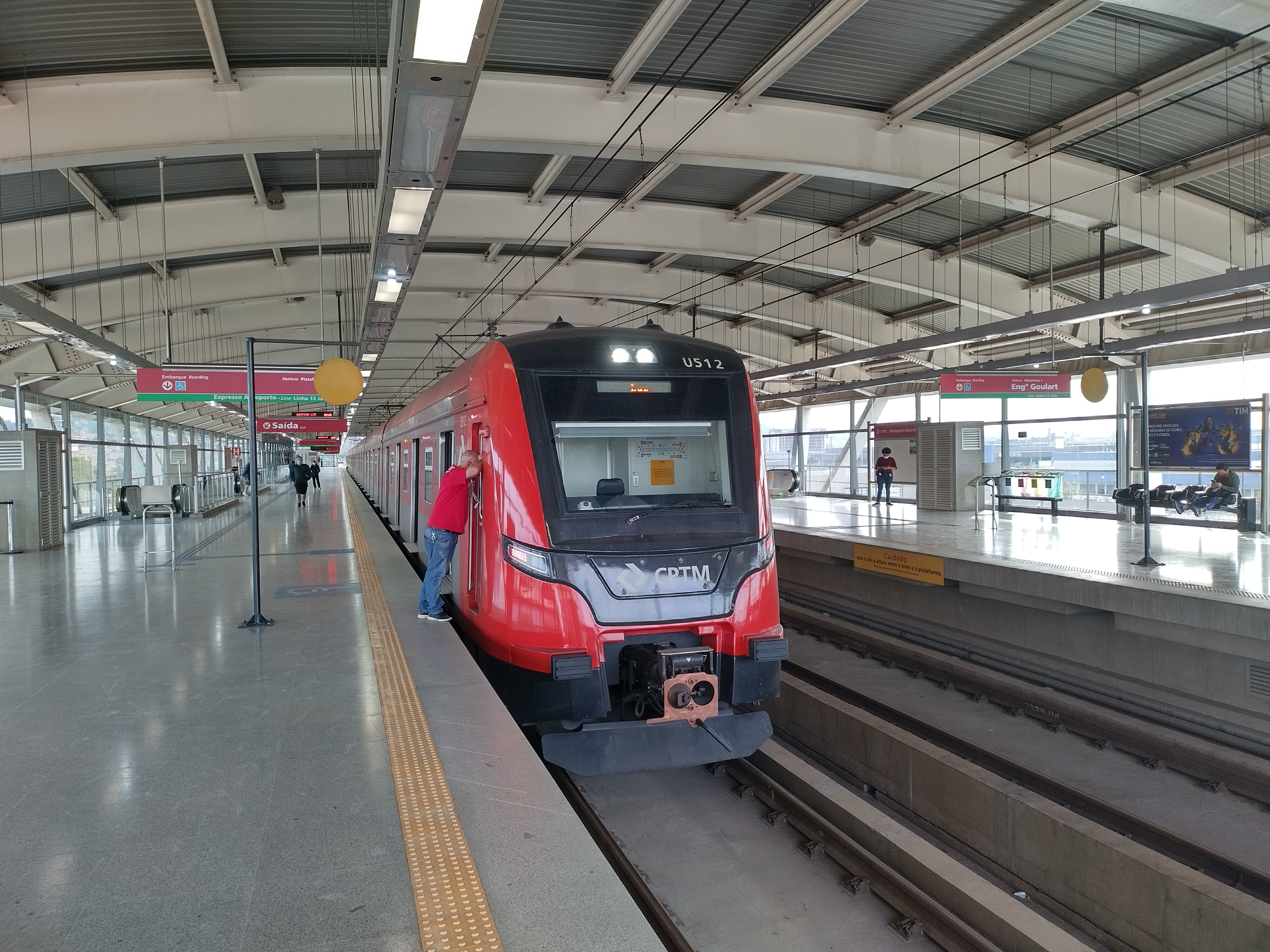
Airport Guarulhos Station, Line 13

Additionally, since December 2020 there's the Airport Express service, from Luz station to Aeroporto-Guarulhos, departing from each terminus every hour. It attends only one station towards Aeroporto-Guarulhos (Guarulhos-CECAP station), and 2 stations towards Luz (Guarulhos-CECAP and Brás).

Aeroporto-Guarulhos station is near Terminal 1, which is Guarulhos Airport's smallest and least busy, and not linked to the other terminals except by a shuttle bus. The GRU Airport company reportedly vetoed a station closer to much busier Terminals 2 and 3 because it intended to build a shopping mall at the proposed location. The excessive number of train changes through crowded commuter rail and subway lines, and the added inconvenience of the requirement for a shuttle bus, has attracted criticism to the São Paulo state government, responsible for São Paulo's subway and commuter rail systems, which has been accused of flawed planning and overindulgence with the airport's private concessionaire.

To solve this situation, Governor João Doria and State Secretary of Metropolitan Transports Alexandre Baldy proposed a people mover to connect the CPTM station directly to the airport, estimated to be opened in May 2021. However, many delays prevented the construction of the line, which should be built and fully operated by GRU Airport. In November 2020, the Brazilian federal government, through the Ministry of Infrastructure, authorized the construction of the people mover, which should cost R$ 175 million (approximately US$ 47.7 million in 2019).

In December 2020 it was announced that Brazilian firm Aerom, which owns the Aeromovel technology, had been selected to install the system. Construction was due to begin in January 2021 with completing in 2022. The expected opening date for the new people mover is August 2025.

== Airport Express ==
Full map of the Metropolitan Transport Network of São Paulo

On November 19, 2020, during the delivery of the fourth train CRRC Qingdao Sifang 2500 Series, the then-Secretary of Transports Alexandre Baldy confirmed a new express service, which started operating on December 1, 2020. The new service initially connected Luz and Aeroporto Guarulhos stations, with stops at Guarulhos-CECAP and Brás (towards Luz only). Effective September 1, 2023, the Expresso Aeroporto was extended to Palmeiras - Barra Funda, offering direct train connections between Palmeiras - Barra Funda, Luz, and Aeroporto-Guarulhos stations without transfers. The trains depart every hour from both terminus stations, operating between 5 AM and midnight and there is no special fare for this service.

== Former services ==
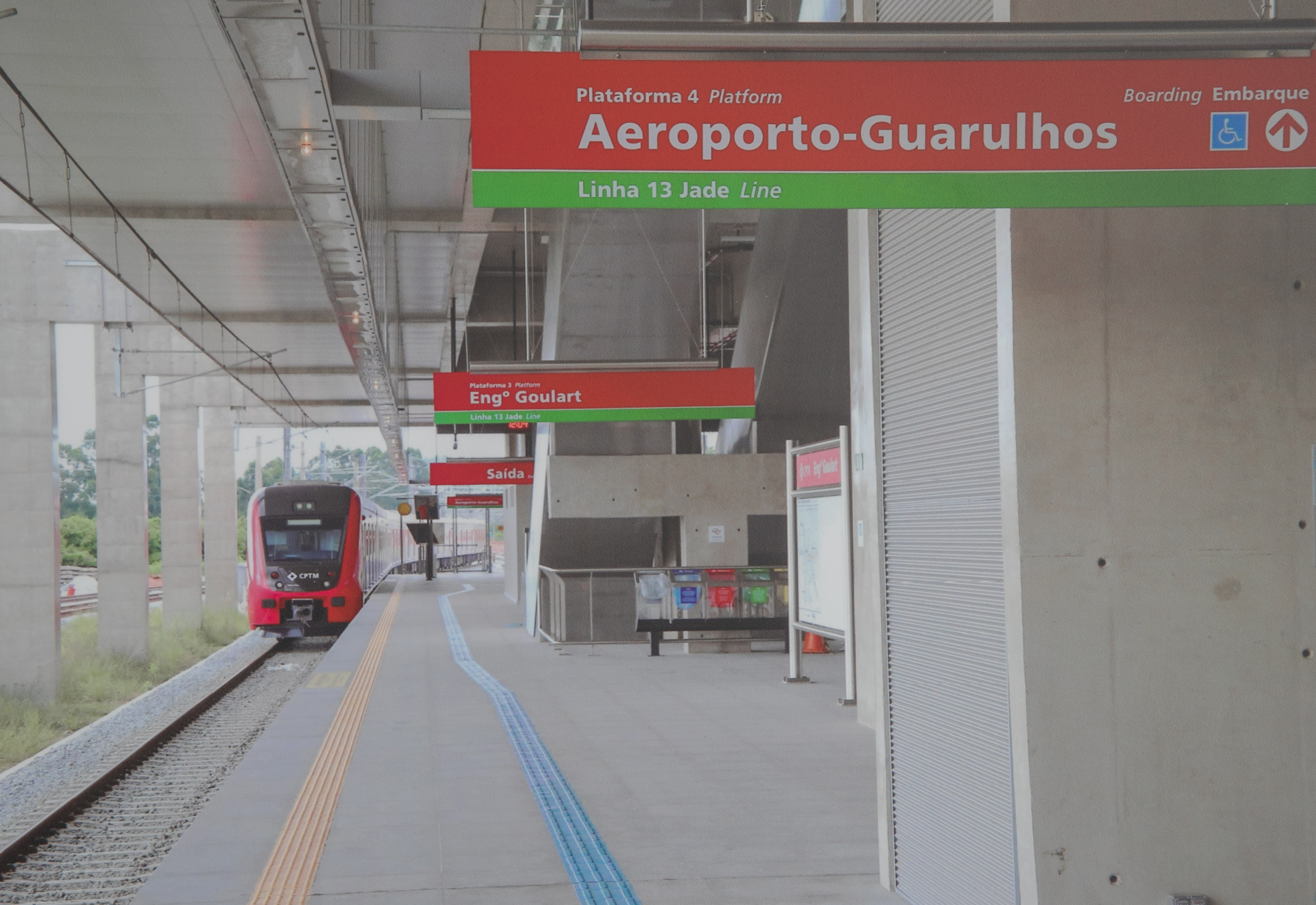
Engenheiro Goulart station

It was available since October 3, 2018 the special service Connect, which consisted of trains between Brás Station and Guarulhos Airport Station during peak hours (from 5:40am to 8:20am and from 5:20pm to 8:00pm), with no need to exchange trains at Engenheiro Goulart Station, offering direct access to São Paulo city center and also easier connections to other subway lines. There was no special fare for this service. The total route of the Connect service consisted of 5 stations and was 21.7 km (13.5 mi) long. The service was suspended in March 2020 and on November 16, 2020, Secretary Baldy confirmed that Airport Connect service was officially extinct.

There was also a first version of the Airport Express service between Luz Station and Guarulhos Airport Station during specific timetables: 10am, 12pm, 2pm, 4pm and 10pm from Luz towards the Airport and 9am, 11am, 1pm, 3pm and 9pm from the Airport towards Luz. There was a convenience fare for this service: $8,60 BRL ($1.6 USD), twice the price of normal fare at the time.

== Future expansion ==
Original plans for Line 13 consisted of an underground route from Engenheiro Goulart to Chácara Klabin via the city centre, however this is expected to be replaced by using existing overground tracks from Engenheiro Goulart to Luz Station. A northward extension is planned from the airport to Bonsucesso in Guarulhos.

== Stations ==
Code	Station	Platforms	Position	Connections	City
BFU	Palmeiras–Barra Funda	Island and side platforms	At-grade	Station attended by Airport-Express only. Barra Funda Bus Terminal; Barra Funda Road Terminal	São Paulo
LUZ	Luz	Island and side platforms	At-grade	Station attended by Airport-Express only. Touristic Express	São Paulo
BAS	Brás	Island and side platforms	At-grade	Station attended by Airport-Express only.	São Paulo
EGO	Engenheiro Goulart	Island platforms	At-grade	Companhia Paulista de Trens Metropolitanos Line 12 (CPTM)	São Paulo
GRC	Guarulhos–CECAP	Island platforms	Elevated	Guarulhos Road Terminal; Guarulhos–São Paulo Metropolitan Corridor	Guarulhos
AGU	Aeroporto–Guarulhos	Side platforms	Elevated	GRU Airport Shuttle Service; GRU Airport People Mover; Taboão Metropolitan Terminal; Guarulhos–São Paulo Metropolitan Corridor	Guarulhos

== Gallery ==
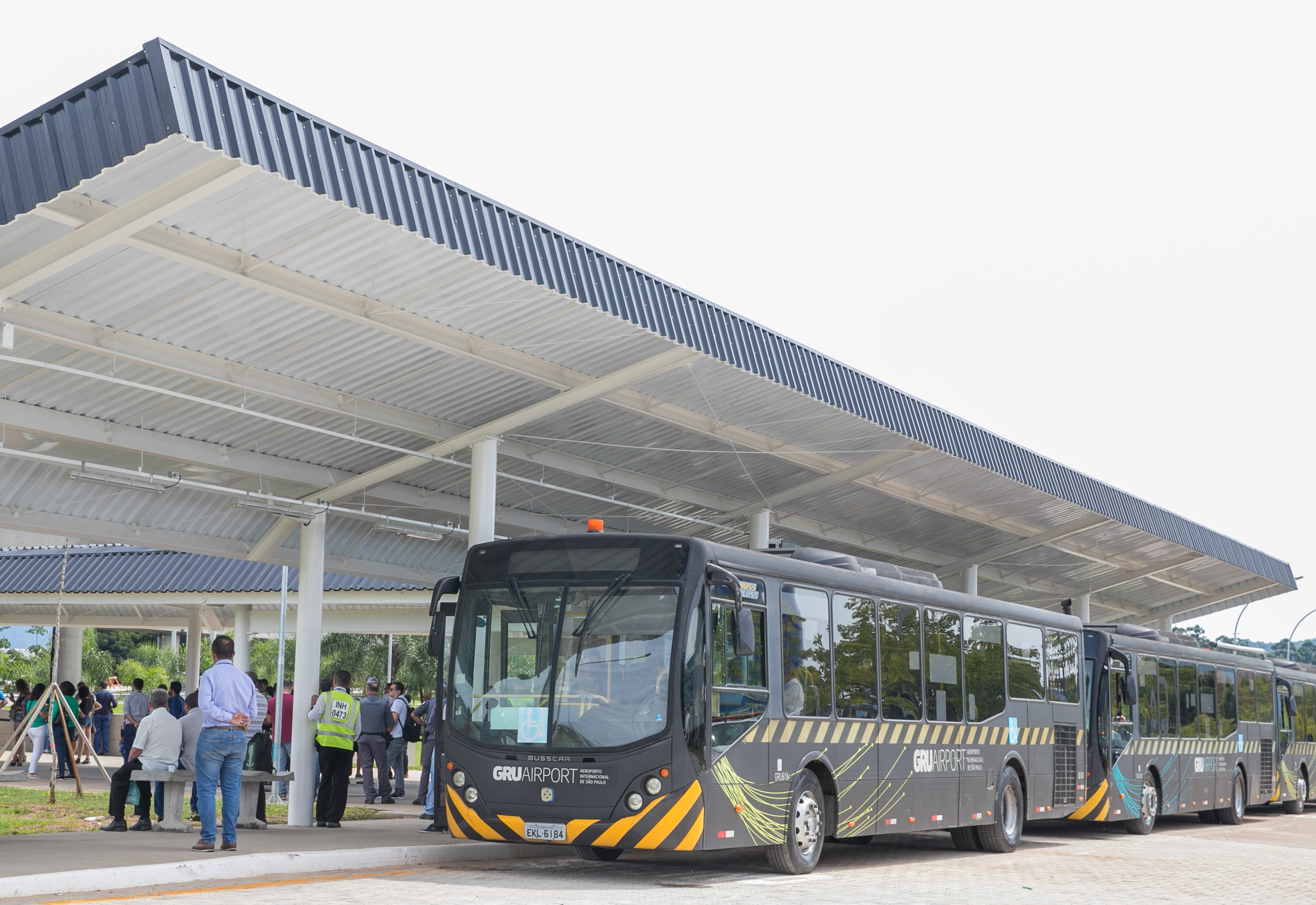
Free transfer service from Guarulhos Airport Station to Airport terminals

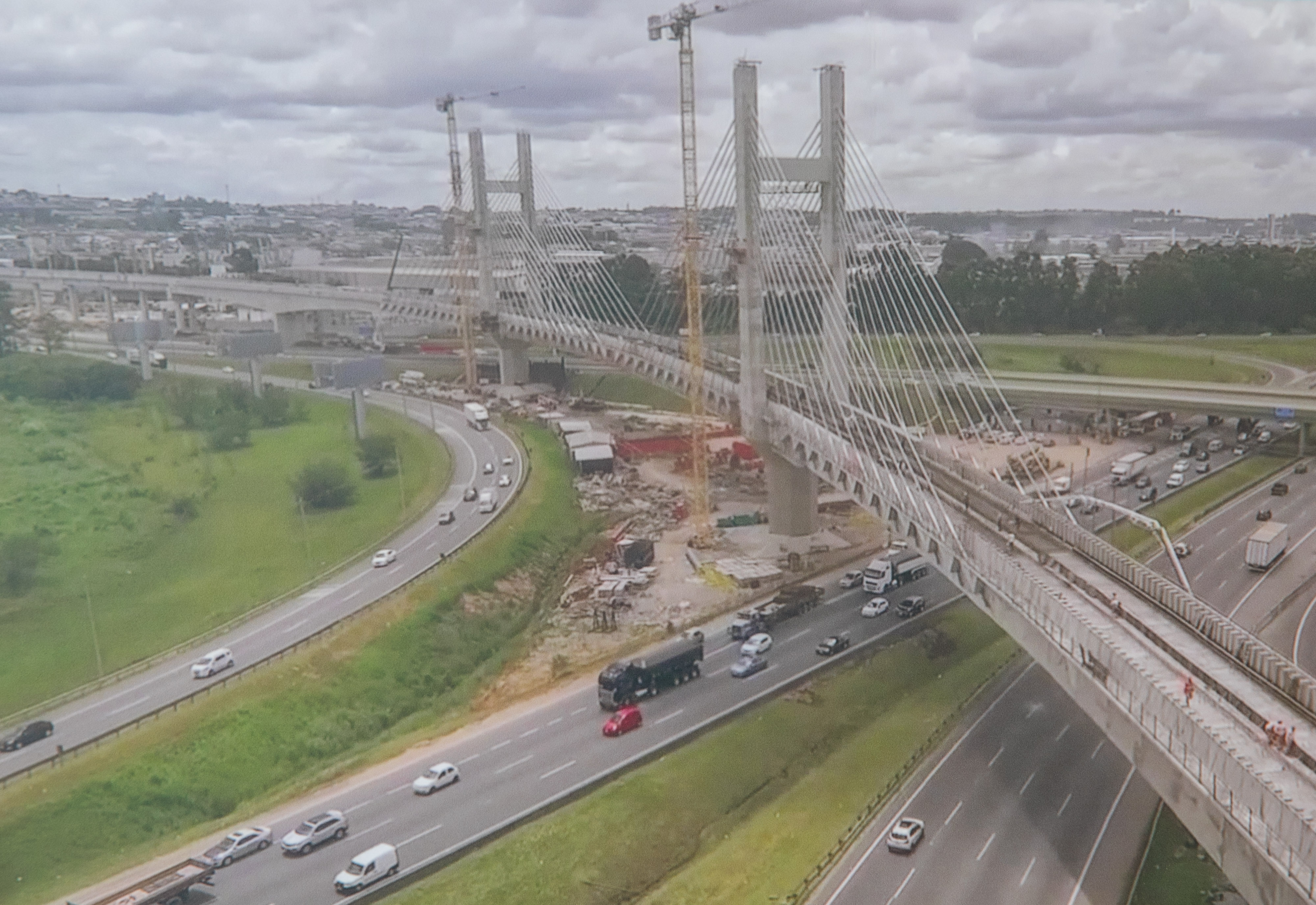
Elevated section of the Line 13 - Jade

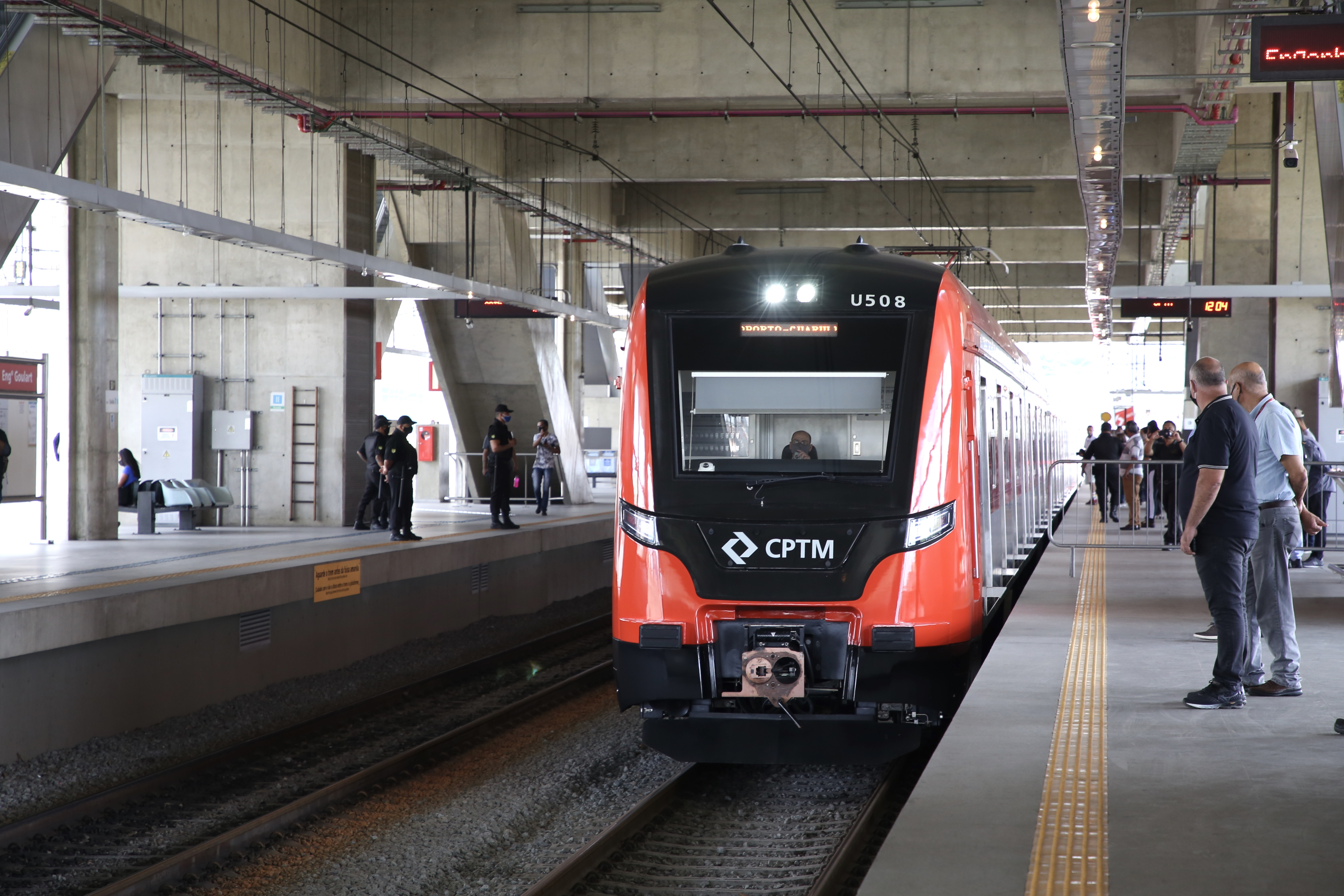
CRRC Qingdao Sifang Series 2500 Train

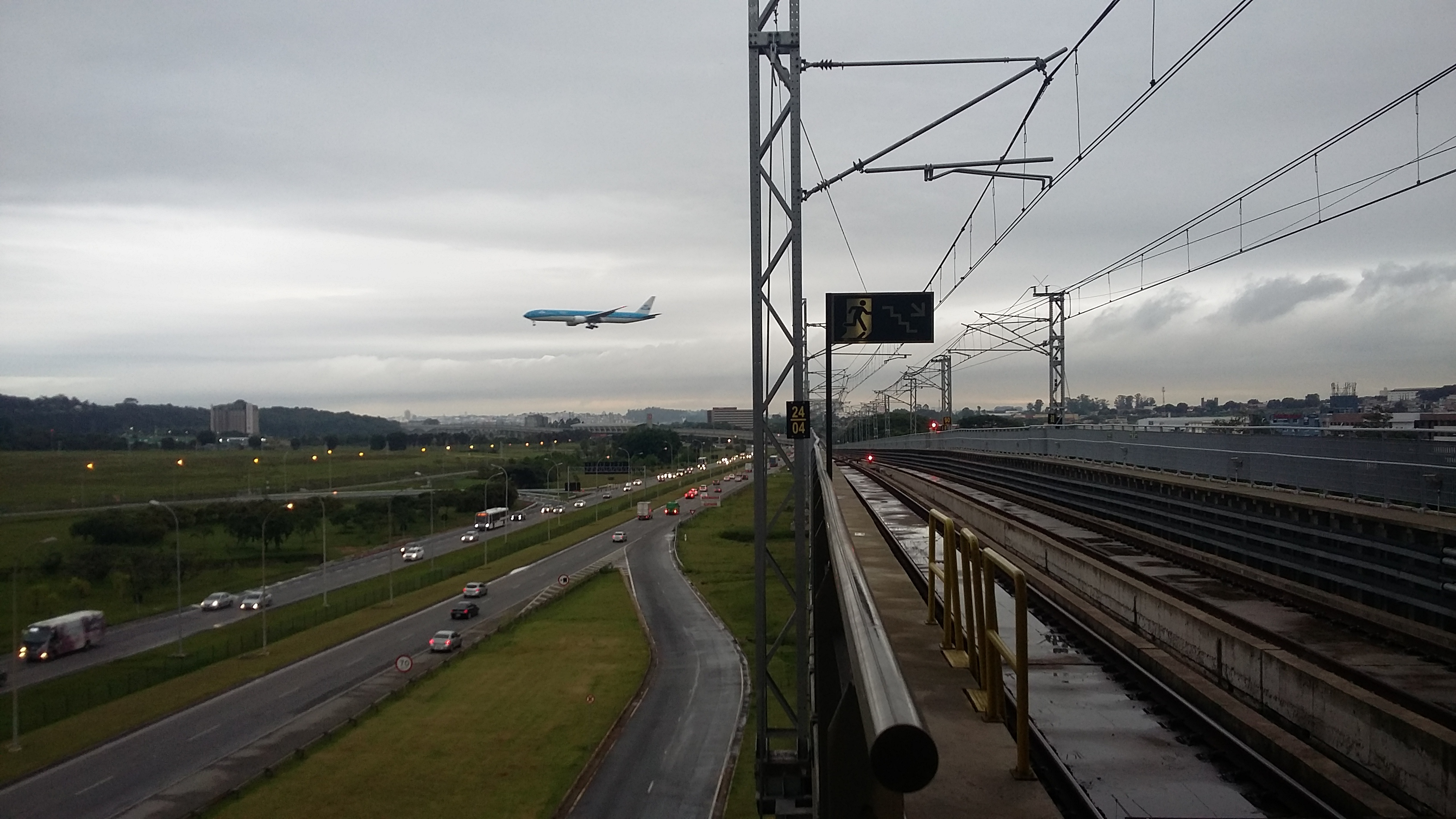
View from Aeroporto - Guarulhos station

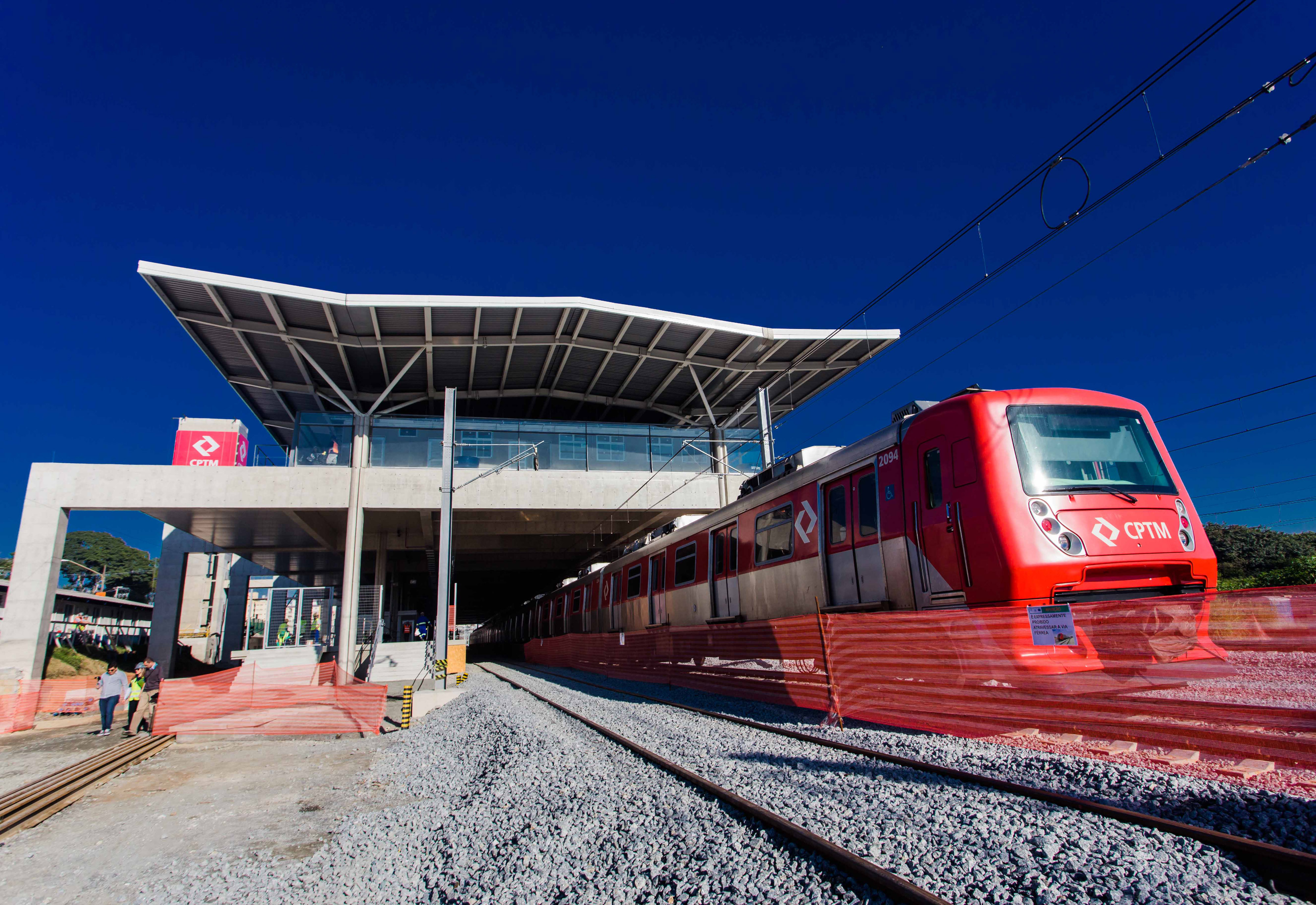
Construction of Line 13 near to Engenheiro Goulart station
