= Guarulhos–São Paulo Metropolitan Corridor =

Bus corridor in Brazil

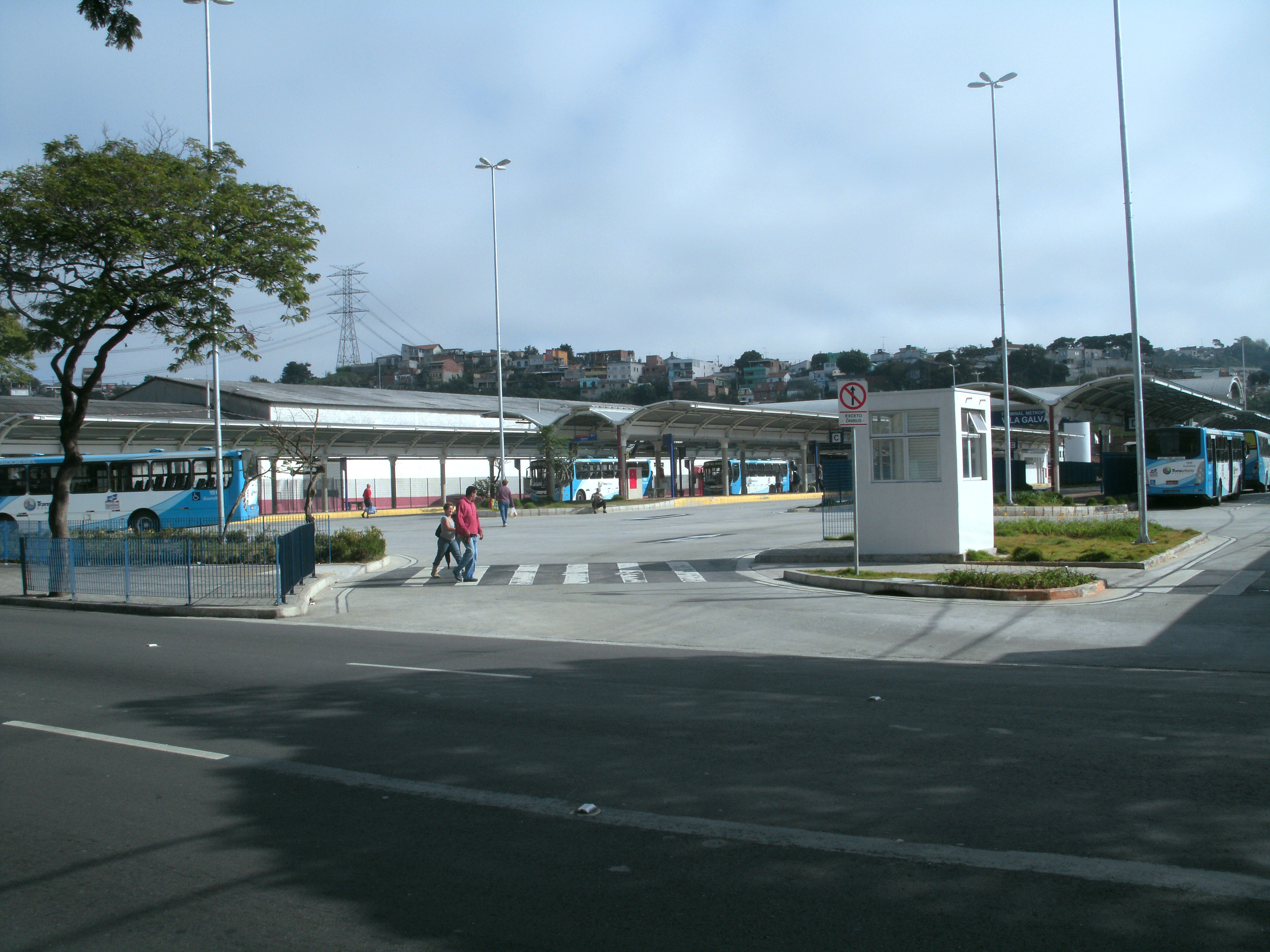
- Vila Galvão Metropolitan Terminal

Overview
- Owner: ARTESP
- Locale: São Paulo; Guarulhos
- Transit type: Bus rapid transit
- Number of stations: 22
- Daily ridership: 100,000 passengers
- Website: www.nextmobilidade.com.br

Operation
- Began operation: 3 July 2013; 13 years ago
- Operator: NEXT Mobilidade

Technical
- System length: 12.3 km (7.6 mi)
- Top speed: 50 km/h (31 mph)

Guarulhos–São Paulo Metropolitan Corridor is a 12.3 km (7.6 mi) long bus corridor, with 3 bus terminals and 19 bus stops. When concluded, it will be 20 km (12 mi) long, with 5 bus terminals, and will attend approximately 100,000 daily passengers.

== History ==
The first projects of bus corridors to Guarulhos were made in the 1980s by EMTU, with the objective of connecting Line 1 - Blue with Guarulhos. In the beginning of the 2000s, the project TEU (Urban Express Transport) was launched, which predicted the connection of Tucuruvi, Vila Galvão, Vila Endres, Taboão and International Airport. Besides being included in the Urban Transports Integrated Plan (PITU), the project was paralyzed for years because of lack of funds until being divided in 5 phases:

- Phase I - Taboão-CECAP
- Phase II - CECAP-Vila Galvão
- Phase III - Vila Endres-Penha (Tiquatira)
- Phase IV - Vila Galvão-Tucuruvi
- Phase V - Taboão-São João

Currently, only Phases I and IV are concluded, while Phase II is partially concluded. Phase III is paralyzed due to negotiations with the Prefecture of Guarulhos and Phase V is in project.
