= Bresser-Mooca (São Paulo Metro) =

São Paulo Metro station

Bresser–Mooca
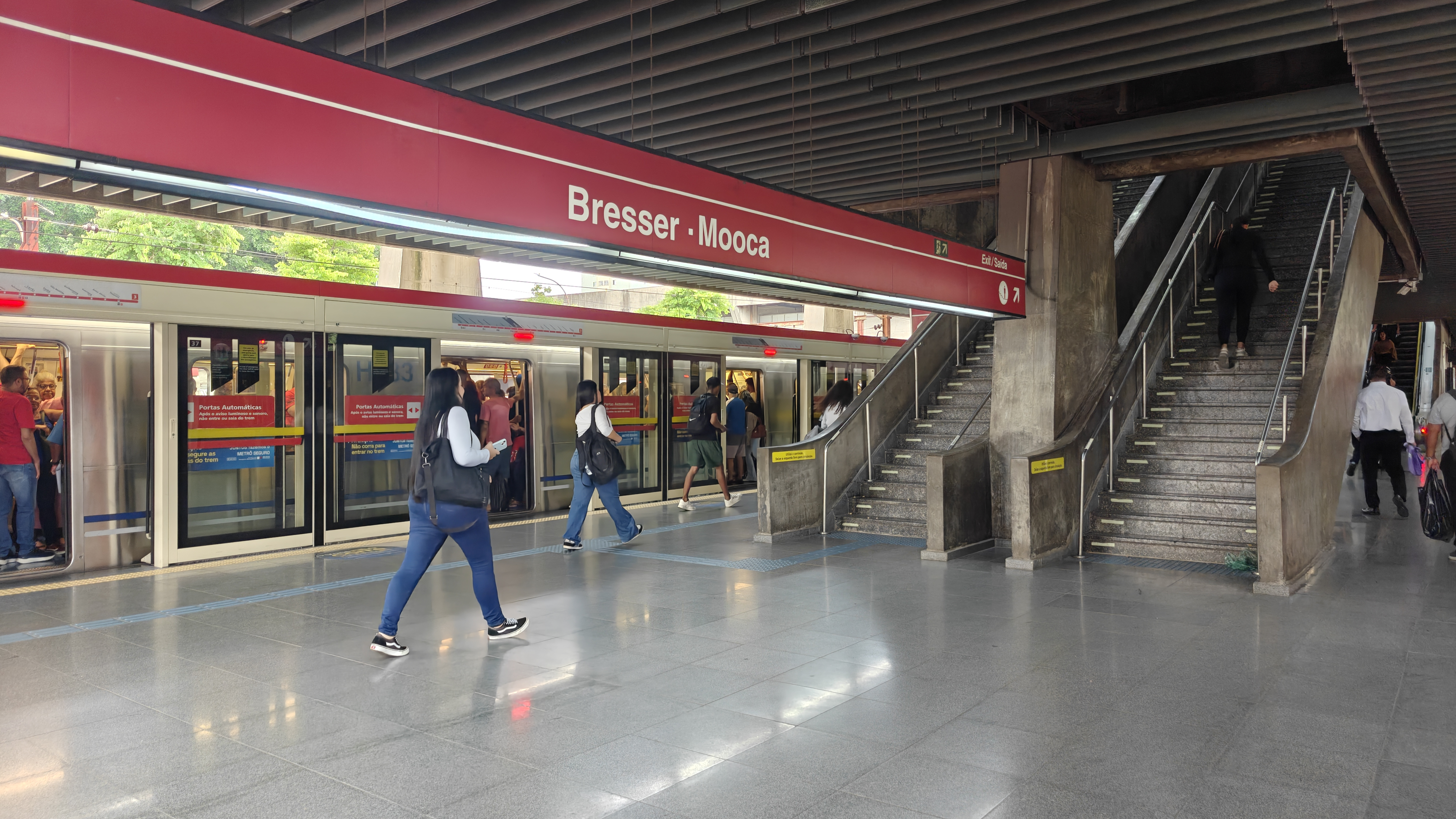
- Bresser-Mooca Station

General information
- Location: São Paulo; Brazil
- Coordinates: 23°32′48″S 46°36′26″W
- Owner: Government of the State of São Paulo
- Operator: Companhia do Metropolitano de São Paulo
- Platforms: Island platforms
- Connections: Access to SPTrans Bus Line

Construction
- Structure type: At-grade
- Accessible: y

Other information
- Station code: BRE

History
- Opened: August 23, 1980
- Former names: Bresser

Passengers
- 30,000/business day

Services
Preceding station	São Paulo Metro	Following station
Brás towards Palmeiras–Barra Funda	Line 3	Belém towards Corinthians-Itaquera
Track layout
Location

Bresser–Mooca is a station on Line 3 (Red) of the São Paulo Metro.

== SPTrans Lines ==
The following SPTrans bus lines can be accessed. Passengers may use a Bilhete Único card for transfer:

Line	Destination
372F/10	Universidade São Judas Tadeu
373T/10	Jardim Itápolis
3539/10	Cid. Tiradentes
573A/10	Vila Alpina
573H/10	Sapopemba Hospital
