= Santa Cecília (São Paulo Metro) =

São Paulo Metro station

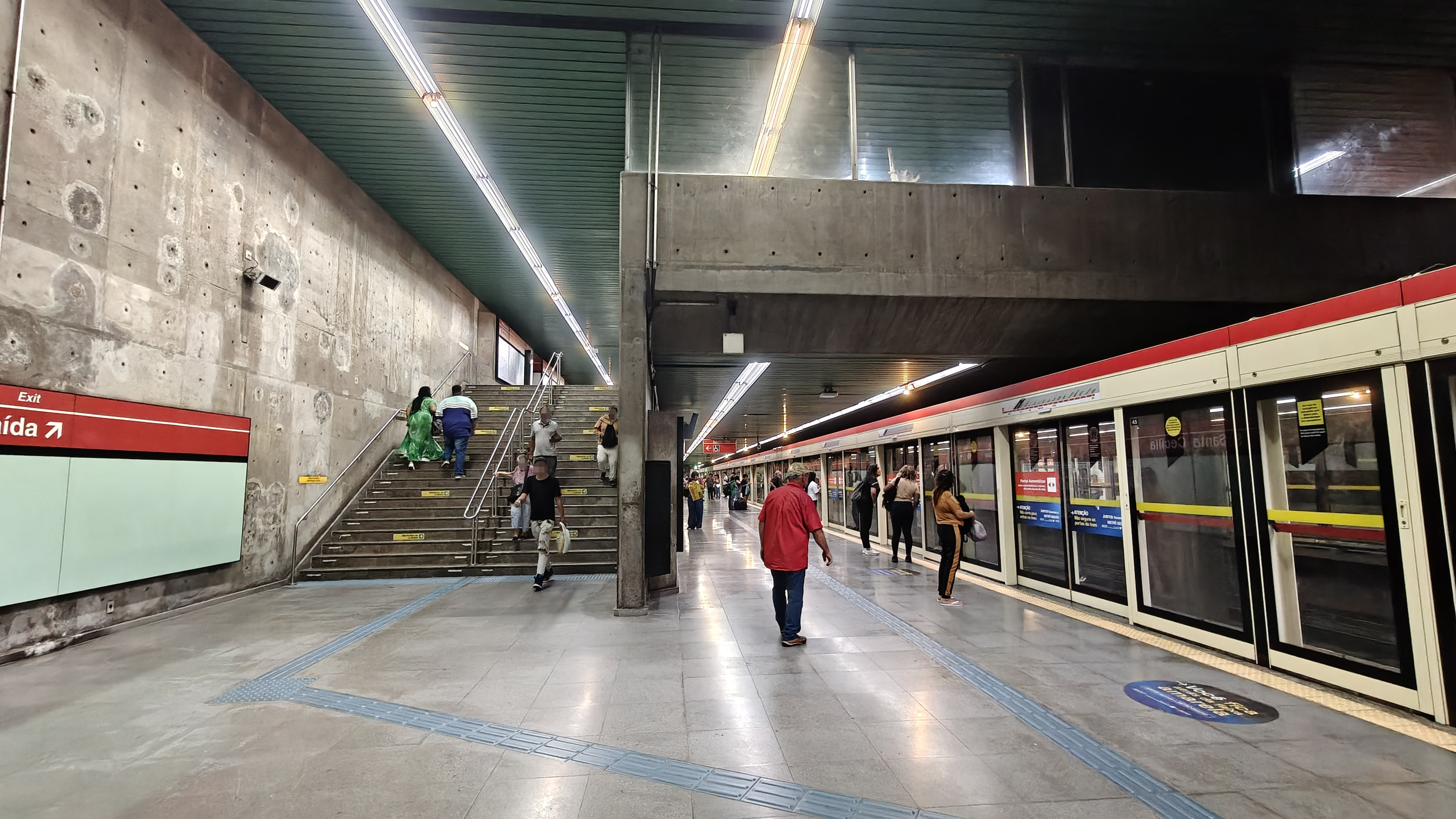
- Platform of Santa Cecília metro station

General information
- Location: São Paulo; Brazil
- Coordinates: 23°32′19″S 46°38′59″W
- Owner: Government of the State of São Paulo
- Operator: Companhia do Metropolitano de São Paulo
- Platforms: Side platforms
- Connections: Amaral Gurgel Bus Terminal

Construction
- Structure type: Underground
- Accessible: Y

Other information
- Station code: CEC

History
- Opened: December 10, 1983

Passengers
- 23,000/business day

Services
Preceding station	São Paulo Metro	Following station
Marechal Deodoro towards Palmeiras–Barra Funda	Line 3	República towards Corinthians-Itaquera
Track layout
Location

Santa Cecília is a station on Line 3 (Red) of the São Paulo Metro.
