= Carrão (São Paulo Metro) =

São Paulo Metro station

Carrão–Assaí Atacadista
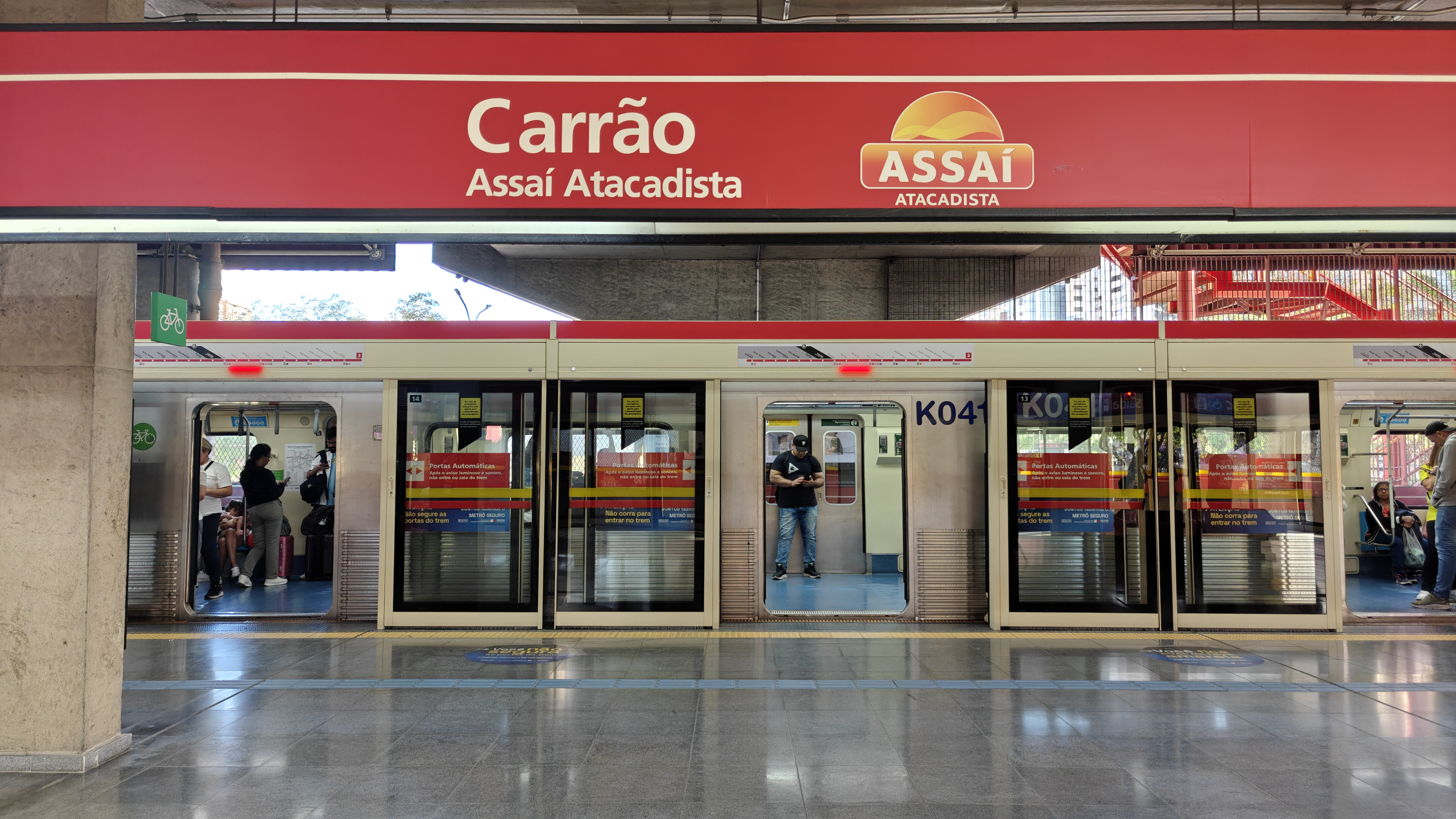

General information
- Location: São Paulo; Brazil
- Coordinates: 23°32′15″S 46°33′49″W
- Owner: Government of the State of São Paulo
- Operator: Companhia do Metropolitano de São Paulo
- Platforms: Island platform
- Connections: North Carrão Bus Terminal; South Carrão Bus Terminal, Access to SPTrans Bus Line

Construction
- Structure type: At-grade
- Accessible: y

Other information
- Station code: CAR

History
- Opened: May 31, 1986

Passengers
- 49,000/business day

Services
Preceding station	São Paulo Metro	Following station
Tatuapé towards Palmeiras–Barra Funda	Line 3	Penha towards Corinthians-Itaquera
Track layout
Location

Carrão, also known as Carrão–Assaí Atacadista for sponsorship reasons, is a station on Line 3 (Red) of the São Paulo Metro. The station was renamed after the purchase of the naming right by the market network Assaí Atacadista.

== SPTrans lines ==
The following SPTrans bus lines can be accessed. Passengers may use a Bilhete Único card for transfer:

Line #
208A/10
3703/10
3729/10
3761/10
3765/10
3773/10
3775/10
3775/51
3778/10
4735/10
573T/10
574T/10
