= Anhangabaú (São Paulo Metro) =

São Paulo Metro station

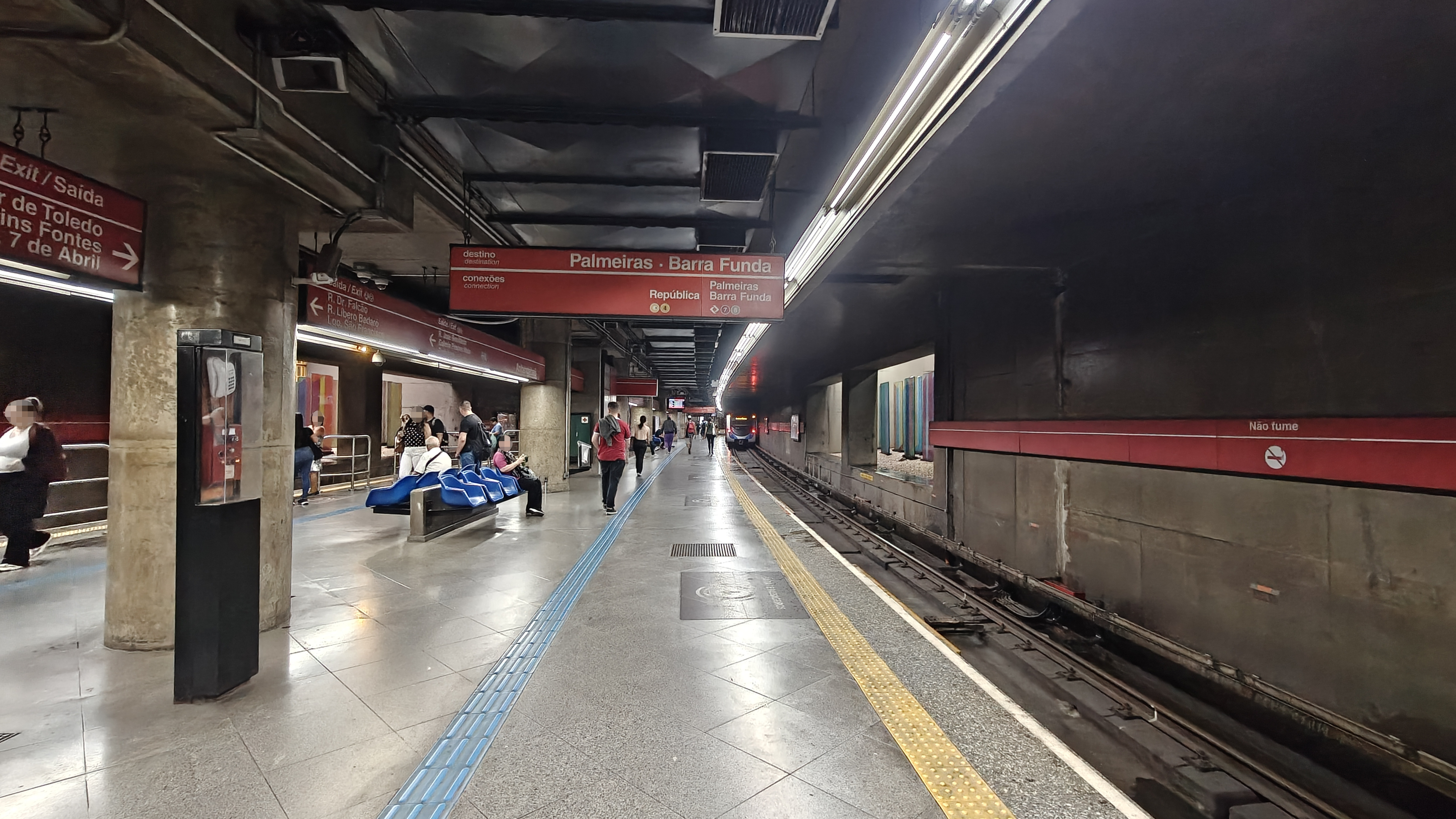
- Platform of Anhangabaú metro station

General information
- Location: São Paulo; Brazil
- Coordinates: 23°32′53″S 46°38′22″W
- Owner: Government of the State of São Paulo
- Operator: Companhia do Metropolitano de São Paulo
- Platforms: Island platform
- Connections: Bandeira Bus Terminal; Pirituba–Lapa–Centro Bus Corridor; Santo Amaro–9 de Julho–Centro Bus Corridor

Construction
- Structure type: Underground
- Accessible: Y

Other information
- Station code: GBU

History
- Opened: November 26, 1983

Passengers
- 52,000/business day

Services
Preceding station	São Paulo Metro	Following station
República towards Palmeiras–Barra Funda	Line 3	Sé towards Corinthians-Itaquera
Future services
Terminus	Line 19 (planned)	São Bento towards Bosque Maia
Track layout
Location

Anhangabaú is a station on Line 3 (Red) of the São Paulo Metro.
