= Sé (São Paulo Metro) =

São Paulo Metro station

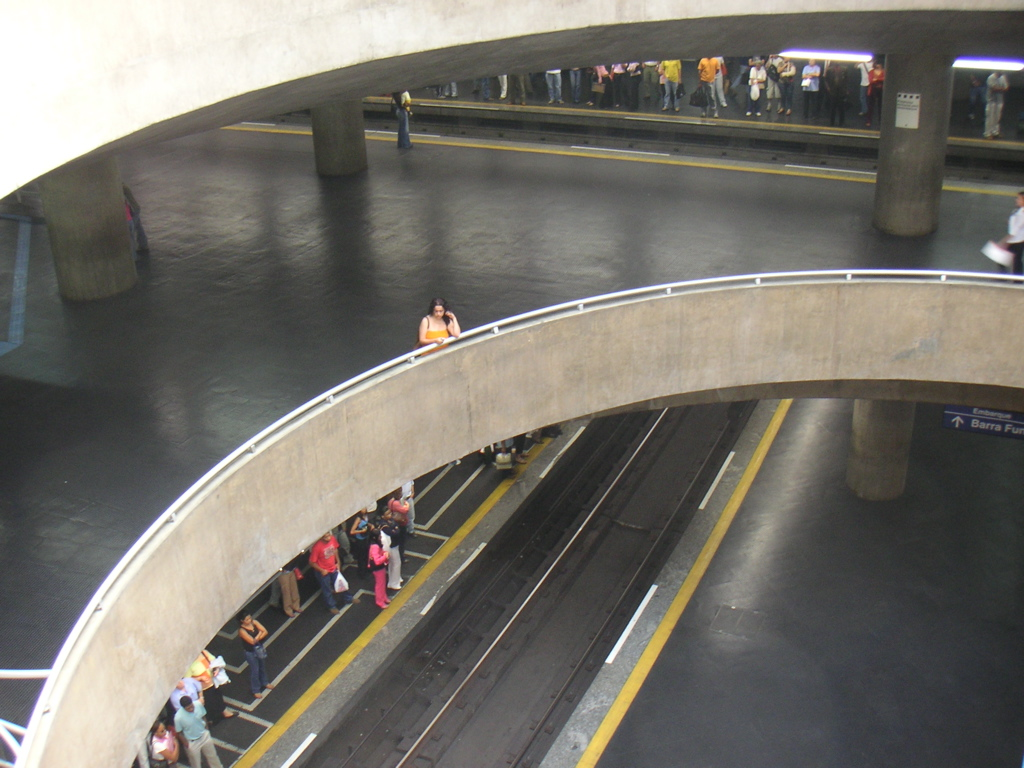
- The two main metro lines cross underneath the downtown square of Praça de Se beside this atrium

General information
- Location: São Paulo; Brazil
- Coordinates: 23°33′02″S 46°38′01″W
- Owner: Government of the State of São Paulo
- Operator: Companhia do Metropolitano de São Paulo
- Platforms: 1 Island platform 2 Side platforms

Construction
- Structure type: Underground
- Accessible: Yes

Other information
- Station code: PSE

History
- Opened: February 17, 1978
- Former names: Clóvis Bevilácqua; Clóvis

Passengers
- 171,000/business day 200,000/business day

Services
Preceding station	São Paulo Metro	Following station
São Bento towards Tucuruvi	Line 1	Japão-Liberdade towards Jabaquara
Anhangabaú towards Palmeiras–Barra Funda	Line 3	Pedro II towards Corinthians-Itaquera
Track layout
Upper level (Line 1)
Lower level (Line 3)
Location

Sé is a central station on Line 1 (Blue) and Line 3 (Red) of the São Paulo Metro. It is located under the Praça da Sé, next to the São Paulo Cathedral. It was officially inaugurated on 17 February 1978.

== History ==
=== Beginnings ===
Praça da Sé has always been present since the first subway projects in São Paulo, either with a station around it or under the square. From 1945 on, with the implementation of the first bus terminal in the city, Praça da Sé was consolidating itself as a nerve center for transport in the capital, with huge queues of passengers for the few buses going to all corners of the city. The construction of the Wilson Mendes Caldeira Building in its surroundings symbolized the frenetic growth of the city of São Paulo, which at that time received the nickname “the fastest growing city in the world”. As a result, São Paulo's transport systems gradually collapsed, putting pressure on the authorities to solve the transport problem.

After several failed attempts, in 1966 the Grupo Executivo do Metropolitano (GEM) was formed, and on March 24, 1968 the Companhia do Metropolitano de São Paulo (Metrô) was founded, which hired a consortium formed by the German construction companies Hochtief and Deconsult and by Montreal, forming the HMD Consortium.

=== Project ===
The HMD Consortium hired a team of urban architects led by Marcelo Aciolly Fragelli, who created the station designs. In the central region, the Clóvis Beviláqcua station was designed by architects Roberto McFadden and José Paulo de Bem; however, as it is the largest station in the network (housing the North-South and East-West lines and a third line to Santo Amaro- which ended up not getting off the ground) this project was conceived slowly. The lack of space to build the station was its biggest challenge until the team proposed a radical change: the unification of the Sé and Clóvis Beviláqcua squares and the demolition of the Wilson Mendes Caldeira Building and Palacete Santa Helena. This decision caused controversy at the time, but the need to build the subway network spoke louder.

=== Construction ===
Unlike the other metro works, which began between 1968 and 1971, the Sé station works only started on February 9, 1974. At that time, the first section of Line 1 had been undergoing tests since 1972 and was about to be opened. This put pressure on the works at the Sé station, which were long overdue. The excavations had the main objective of reaching a depth of 24 metres to allow the arrival of the two tunneling machines and the construction of the tunnel joining the two main work fronts of the North-South Line. During the excavations, a section suffered a landslide (caused by water infiltration), further delaying the works.

On September 26, 1975, trains on the North-South Line were already passing under the works at Sé station, which were still slow, due to the manual demolition of Palacete Santa Helena. Meanwhile, the demolition of the 32-story Mendes Caldeira Building was planned. Metro technicians came to the conclusion that a demolition method that had never been seen before in Latin America would be necessary: implosion.

==== Implosion of the Wilson Mendes Caldeira Building ====
To carry out the task, the national company Triton and the American company Controlled Demolition, Inc. (CDI) were hired. Demolition was scheduled for November 1975. The demolition of the Wilson Mendes Caldeira Building was marked by great controversy, as until then the tallest building demolished in the world had 22 floors. The reinforced concrete structure of the building was very resistant, causing engineers to fear that the building would split in half and fall onto the Sé Cathedral or neighboring buildings. A Brazilian explosives manufacturer refused to provide material for the demolition fearing he would be held responsible for a major tragedy. Finally, even the Catholic Church was opposed, fearing the destruction of the Sé cathedral.

CDI technicians installed 777 explosive charges in the Wilson Mendes Caldeira Building totaling nearly a thousand pounds. In the early hours of 16 November 1975, the surroundings of Praça da Sé were filled with thousands of spectators to watch this unprecedented feat in the city. At 7:32 in the morning, the bells of the Sé cathedral tolled intensely, marking the moment of the implosion. In 9 seconds, the 27-storey building had been reduced to a mass of rubble, in a perfect implosion (the only damage was two shattered windows of a building and a house on the outskirts of the implosion), at a cost of US$270,000. It was the first implosion carried out in Latin America. The cleaning work lasted 20 days and the works were finally able to be resumed with the necessary speed.

=== Inauguration ===
Construction work on the Sé station was completed in early 1978, and the North-South (1) Line station was opened, along with the unified and redeveloped Praça da Sé, on February 17, 1978. The East-West Line (3) station was opened during the inauguration of this line on March 10, 1979. In a short time, the station consolidated itself as the busiest in the subway network, with around 600,000 people passing through it daily (the equivalent of the population of Osasco).

== Characteristics ==
This underground station has two levels: one for the boarding of Line 1–Blue, and one for the boarding of Line 3–Red. It also consists of a distribution mezzanine and two overlapping levels with two lateral platforms and a central one (one set per line) with an exposed concrete structure and openings for natural lighting. The main access is integrated with the square at the promenade level. It has capacity for 100,000 passengers at peak hours, and has 39,925 square metres (429,750 ft^{2}) of built area.

=== Average Demand for This Station ===
In 2023, the Sé Station was the busiest on Line 1 (Blue), with an average of 168,000 passengers on weekdays, considering only those who transferred from Line 3 (Red). It was also the busiest on Line 3 (Red), with an average of 195,000 passengers on weekdays, including only those who transferred from Line 1 (Blue).
