= Belém (São Paulo Metro) =

São Paulo Metro station

- Platform view

General information
- Location: São Paulo; Brazil
- Coordinates: 23°32′36″S 46°35′22″W
- Owner: Government of the State of São Paulo
- Operator: Companhia do Metropolitano de São Paulo
- Platforms: Island platform
- Connections: North Belém Bus Terminal; South Belém Bus Terminal

Construction
- Structure type: At-grade
- Accessible: y

Other information
- Station code: BEL

History
- Opened: September 5, 1981

Passengers
- 38,000/business day

Services
Preceding station	São Paulo Metro	Following station
Bresser-Mooca towards Palmeiras–Barra Funda	Line 3	Tatuapé towards Corinthians-Itaquera
Track layout
Location

Belém is a station on Line 3 (Red) of the São Paulo Metro.

== SPTrans Lines ==
The following SPTrans bus lines can be accessed. Passengers may use a Bilhete Único card for transfer:

Line	Destination
172N/10	Shopping Center Norte
172N/21	Uninove
172P/10	Vila Zilda
172N/22	Catumbi
172R/10	Jaçanã
172Y/10	Vila Constança
271F/10	Shopping Center Norte
3053/10	Jardim Itapolis
3112/10	Vila Industrial
407F/10	Term. São Mateus
407R/10	Term. V. Carrão
3746/10	Jardim Imperador
N407/11	Term. V. Carrão
4729/10	Parque Bancario
574R/10	Sapopemba/Teotônio Vilela Terminal
574W/10	Jardim Walkiria
702C/10	Jardim Bonfiglioli
