= Pedro II (São Paulo Metro) =

São Paulo Metro station

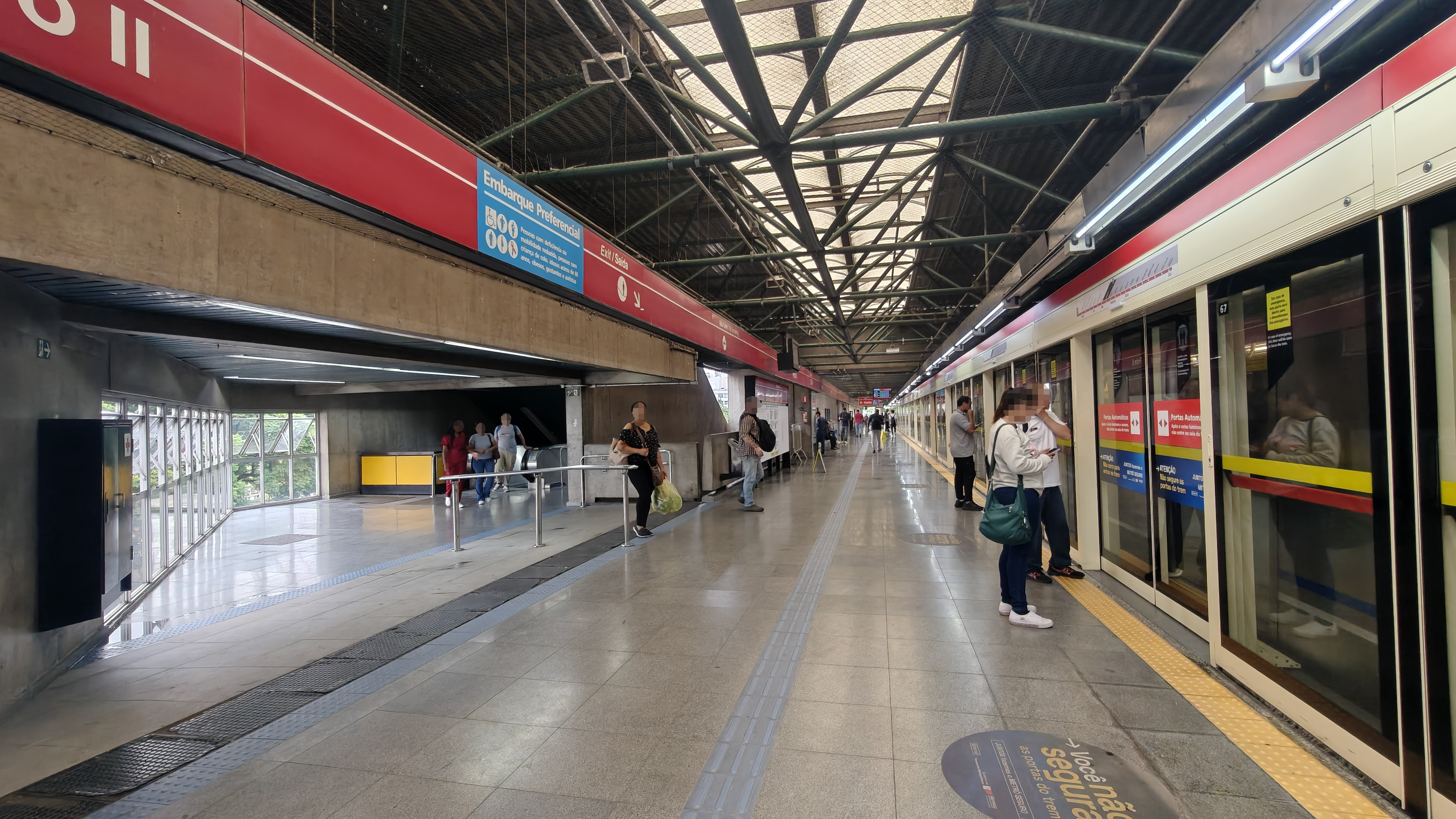
- Platform of Pedro II metro station

General information
- Location: São Paulo; Brazil
- Coordinates: 23°33′00″S 46°37′33″W
- Owner: Government of the State of São Paulo
- Operator: Companhia do Metropolitano de São Paulo
- Platforms: Side platforms
- Connections: Expresso Tiradentes

Construction
- Structure type: Elevated
- Accessible: Y

Other information
- Station code: PDS

History
- Opened: March 10, 1979

Passengers
- 16,000/business day

Services
Preceding station	São Paulo Metro	Following station
Sé towards Palmeiras–Barra Funda	Line 3	Brás towards Corinthians-Itaquera
Track layout
Location

Pedro II is a station on Line 3 (Red) of the São Paulo Metro.

== See also ==
- Parque Dom Pedro II
