= Tatuapé (São Paulo Metro) =

São Paulo Metro station

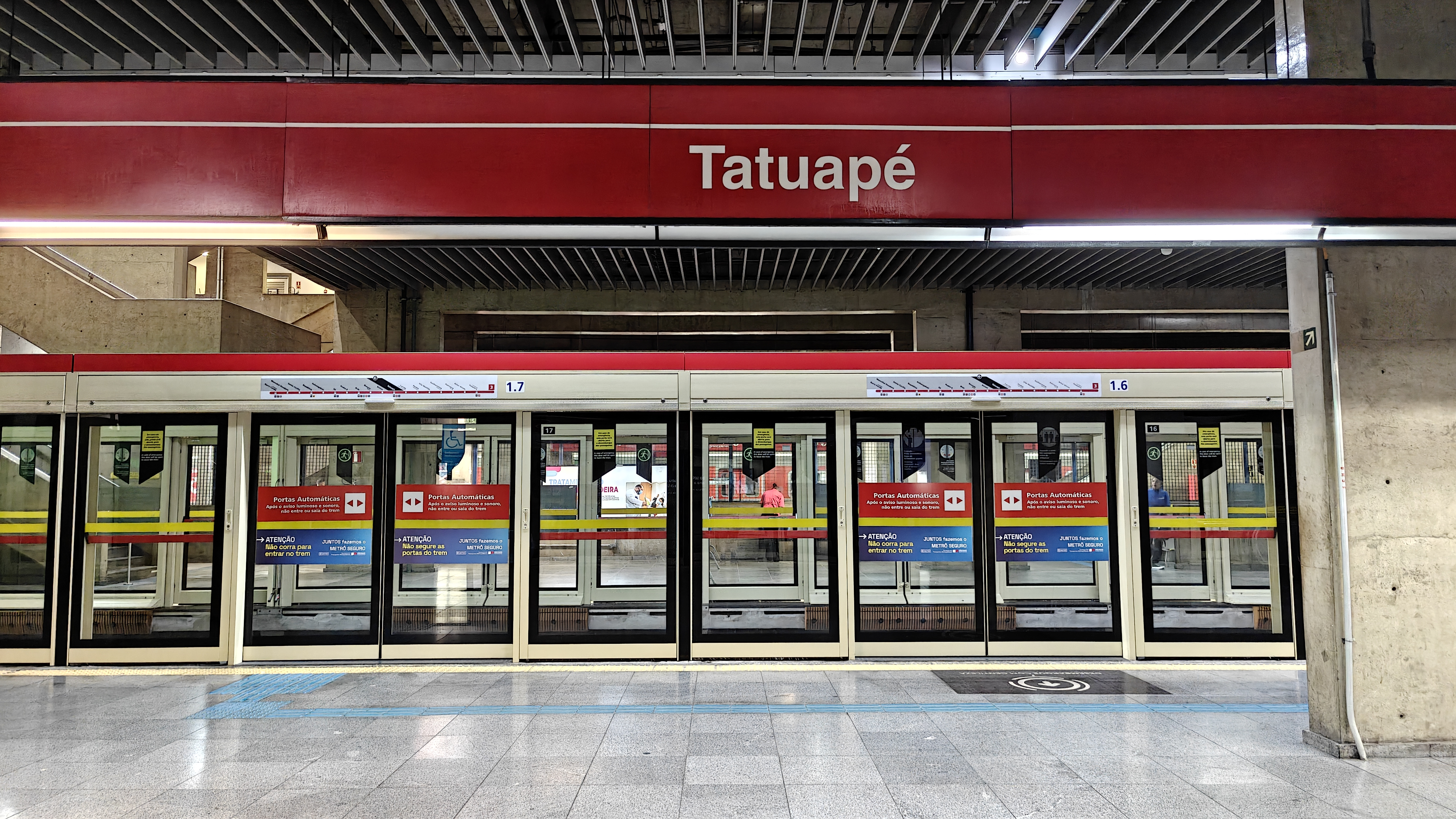
- Platform of Tatuapé metro station

General information
- Location: R. Catiguá, Tatuapé; São Paulo; Brazil
- Coordinates: 23°32′25″S 46°34′34″W
- Owner: Government of the State of São Paulo
- Operator: Companhia do Metropolitano de São Paulo; CPTM
- Platforms: Side and island platforms
- Connections: North Tatuapé Bus Terminal; South Tatuapé Bus Terminal

Construction
- Structure type: At-grade
- Accessible: y

Other information
- Station code: TAT

History
- Opened: 5 November 1981

Passengers
- 76,000/business day

Services
Preceding station	São Paulo Metro	Following station
Belém towards Palmeiras–Barra Funda	Line 3	Carrão towards Corinthians-Itaquera

Out-of-system interchange
Preceding station	São Paulo Metropolitan Trains	Following station
Brás towards Palmeiras-Barra Funda	Line 11	Corinthians-Itaquera towards Estudantes
Brás Terminus	Line 12	Engenheiro Goulart towards Calmon Viana
Track layout
Line 3 track layout
CPTM track layout
Location

Tatuapé is a station which is part of a metropolitan system composed by CPTM and São Paulo Metro.

It is connected to Shopping Metrô Tatuapé (south of the station) and Shopping Metrô Boulevard Tatuapé (north of the station). It's located in the homonymous district of Tatuapé, divided physically between areas 3 and 4 of the capital.

== History ==
The project of Tatuapé station began in 1973, when the Federal Railway Network (RFFSA) and the São Paulo Metro agreed for the construction of an east track of the Line East-West (current Line 3-Red). The first project was published in May 1975 and predicted the connection of the Metro lines and RFFSA suburbs in Tatuapé station. The construction of Line East-West began in March 1976, but the first Executive Order of expropriation for the construction of the future Tatuapé station was published only on June.

Besides the signature of a memorandum of understanding between RFFSA and the Metro in June 1977, the station construction were initiated by construction company Beter S.A. only on 29 April 1978. On 29 April 1979, a new phase of construction was launched, when a new track of Radial Leste was delivered, allowing the start of the construction of the main block of Tatuapé station, with a 18,000 square metres (190,000 sq ft) total area. Promised for mid-1980, the station had its opening delayed because of problems with funds.

Tatuapé station was opened by Governor Paulo Maluf, using a wheelchair (despite the station not having any elevators - the first was installed only in 1982), on 5 November 1981.

== Characteristics ==
The route between Belém and Tatuapé demanded an excavation of 313,346 cubic metres (11,065,700 cu ft) of soil, 7,713 metres (25,305 ft) of stakes of "Franki" type, 4,675 cubic metres (165,100 cu ft) of structural concrete, 1,428 cubic metres (50,400 cu ft) of pre-molded concrete, 155,327 cubic metres (5,485,300 cu ft) of backfill, and 1,021 metres (3,350 ft) of metallic stacking.

Tatuapé is a station with distribution mezzanine above island and side platforms on surface, structure in apparent concrete and lattice special metallic cover. It has access for people with disabilities and reduced movements, a 34,680 square metres (373,300 sq ft) area, and capacity for 60,000 passengers per hour in peak hours.

== Toponymy ==
The word "Tatuapé" is an indigenous term of tupi origin that can mean "way of the armadillos" (tatu: armadillo, and apé: way).

== Connections ==
Tatuapé station of the São Paulo Metro Line 3-Red has paid connection with stations of CPTM Lines 11-Coral and 12-Sapphire, except in special hours, from Mondays to Fridays between 10am and 5pm and between 8pm and 12am, on Saturdays between 3pm and 1am, and on Sundays and holidays the connection is free during all the operational day.

There is also the possibility to connect with the bus system through the North and South Bus Terminals, both connected to the station, using the Bilhete Único. From the North Terminal there are departure of urban buses of the Airport Bus Service with direct route to São Paulo–Guarulhos International Airport. Another possibility is using the Line 13-Jade Airport-Connect service.
