= Patriarca-Vila Ré (São Paulo Metro) =

São Paulo Metro station

Patriarca–Vila Ré
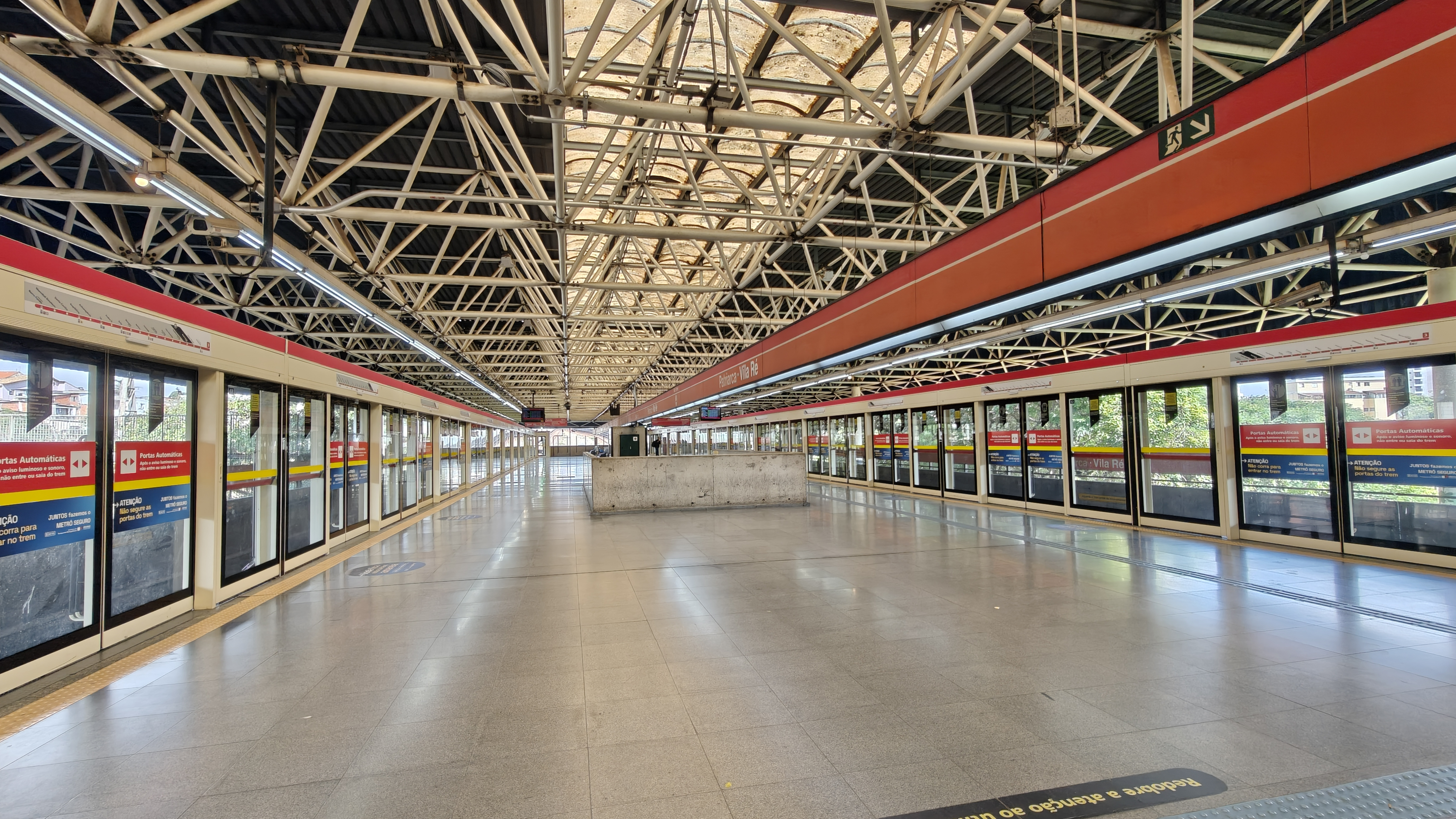

General information
- Location: São Paulo; Brazil
- Coordinates: 23°31′52″S 46°30′06″W
- Owner: Government of the State of São Paulo
- Operator: Companhia do Metropolitano de São Paulo
- Platforms: Island platform
- Connections: Patriarca Bus Terminal

Construction
- Structure type: Semi-elevated
- Accessible: y

Other information
- Station code: PCA

History
- Opened: September 17, 1988
- Former names: Patriarca

Passengers
- 22,000/business day

Services
Preceding station	São Paulo Metro	Following station
Guilhermina-Esperança towards Palmeiras–Barra Funda	Line 3	Artur Alvim towards Corinthians-Itaquera
Track layout
Location

Patriarca–Vila Ré is a station on Line 3 (Red) of the São Paulo Metro.

== SPTrans Lines ==
The following SPTrans bus routes can be accessed. Passengers may use a Bilhete Único card for transfer:

Line
2709/10
2709/31
2710/10
2710/31
2711/10
2715/10
2756/10
3724/10
