= Brás (São Paulo Metro) =

São Paulo Metro station

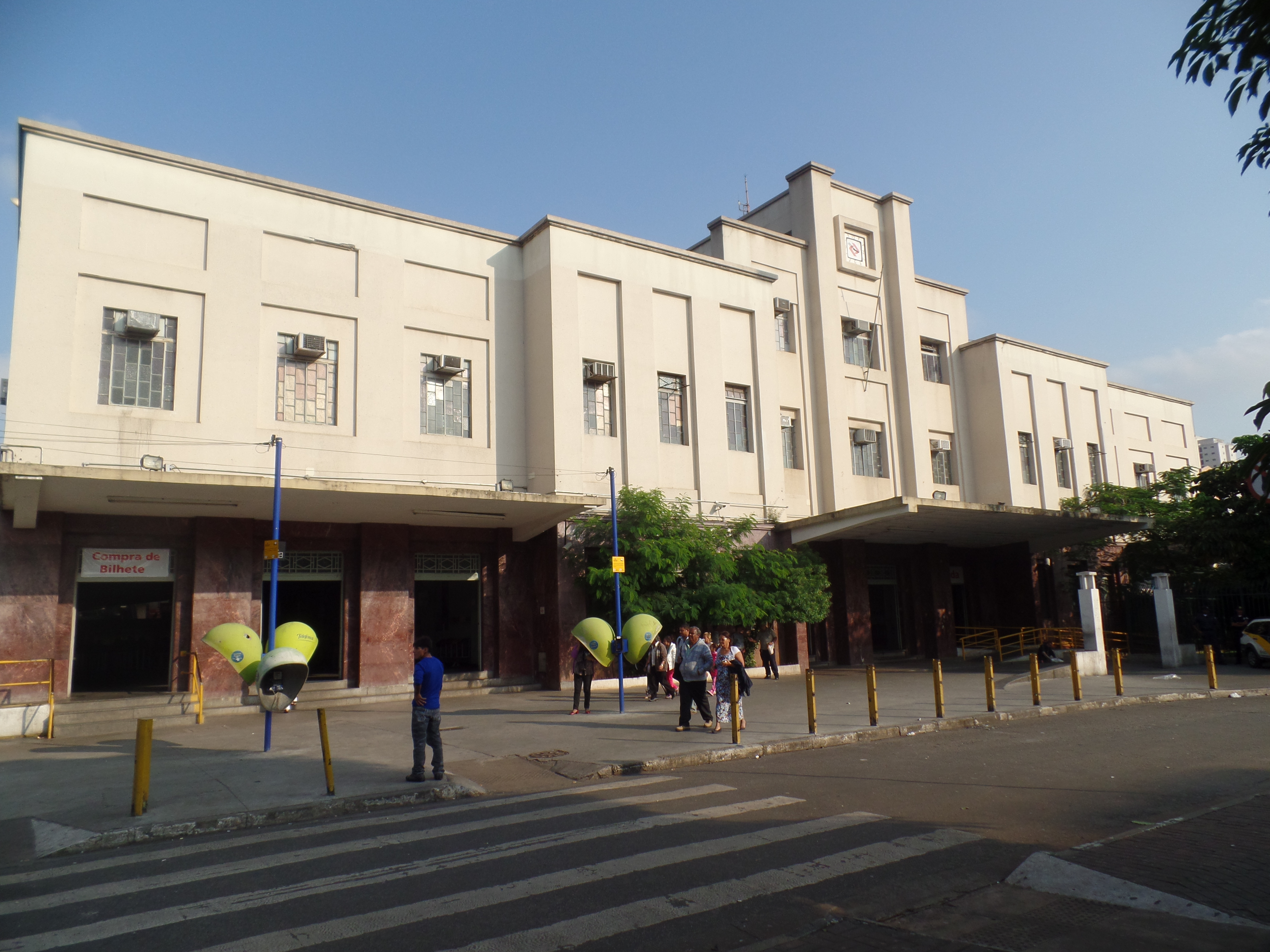
- Building of the station, part of the CPTM

General information
- Location: Rua Domingos Paiva, Brás; São Paulo; Brazil
- Coordinates: 23°32′45″S 46°36′59″W
- Owner: Government of the State of São Paulo
- Operator: Companhia do Metropolitano de São Paulo; CPTM
- Platforms: Island and side platforms Island and side platforms
- Connections: Brás Bus Terminal

Construction
- Structure type: Elevated; At-grade
- Accessible: y

Other information
- Station code: BAS

History
- Opened: 10 March 1979; 16 February 1867
- Former names: Braz; Estação do Norte; Roosevelt

Passengers
- 75,000/business day

Services
Preceding station	São Paulo Metro	Following station
Pedro II towards Palmeiras–Barra Funda	Line 3	Bresser-Mooca towards Corinthians-Itaquera

Out-of-system interchange
Preceding station	São Paulo Metropolitan Trains	Following station
Luz towards Palmeiras-Barra Funda	Line 10	Juventus-Mooca towards Rio Grande da Serra
Luz towards Palmeiras-Barra Funda	Line 11	Tatuapé towards Estudantes
Terminus	Line 12	Tatuapé towards Calmon Viana
Luz towards Palmeiras-Barra Funda	Line 13-Airport Express	Guarulhos-CECAP towards Aeroporto–Guarulhos
Track layout
Line 3 track layout
CPTM track layout
Location

Brás is a station on the Line 3-Red of São Paulo Metro and on the Lines 10-Turquoise, 11-Coral, 12-Sapphire and the Service 710 of CPTM.

== History ==
The first station at this location was opened on February 16, 1867, under the name 'Braz' by the São Paulo Railway (SPR). On November 6, 1875, the Northern Railway (Estrada de Ferro do Norte, later the Estrada de Ferro Central do Brasil) opened a terminal station, called the 'Estação do Norte' for their northern rail lines. The name of this station was changed to "Roosevelt" on September 15, 1945, by presidential decree in homage to the American President Franklin Roosevelt, who died that year.

During the 1950s the government took control of the lines operated by the SPR, and creating the National Rail Company RFFSA (liquidated in 2007). During the 1980s, with the construction of the East-West Line (Red line 3 on the São Paulo Metro) the train station was integrated with the newly inaugurated metro station, forming the integrated Brás station. In 1994, the CPTM assumed administration of the suburban rail service and remodeled the station. After the remodeling, the name 'Roosevelt' was officially dropped, and the station began being called Brás, as was called the original SPR station.

== SPTrans lines ==
The following SPTrans bus lines can be accessed. Passengers may use a Bilhete Único card for transfer:

Line	Destination
5131/10	Cid. Ademar
5630/10	Grajaú Terminal

	Disused railways	
Luz toward Jundiaí	Trunk line The São Paulo Railway Company	Hospedaria dos Immigrantes; Deactivated toward Santos
Terminus	São Paulo Branch; Estrada de Ferro Central do Brasil	Primeira Parada; Deactivated toward Rio de Janeiro
Luz; Terminus	Line D–Beige; CPTM	Moóca toward Paranapiacaba
Luz; Terminus	Line E–Orange; CPTM	Engenheiro Sebastião Gualberto; Deactivated toward Estudantes
Terminus	Line F–Violet; CPTM	Engenheiro Sebastião Gualberto; Deactivated toward Calmon Viana
Luz; Terminus	Express Line 10+ CPTM	Tamanduateí toward Santo André
Luz toward Jundiaí	Service 710; CPTM	Juventus-Mooca toward Rio Grande da Serra
