= Marechal Deodoro (São Paulo Metro) =

São Paulo Metro station

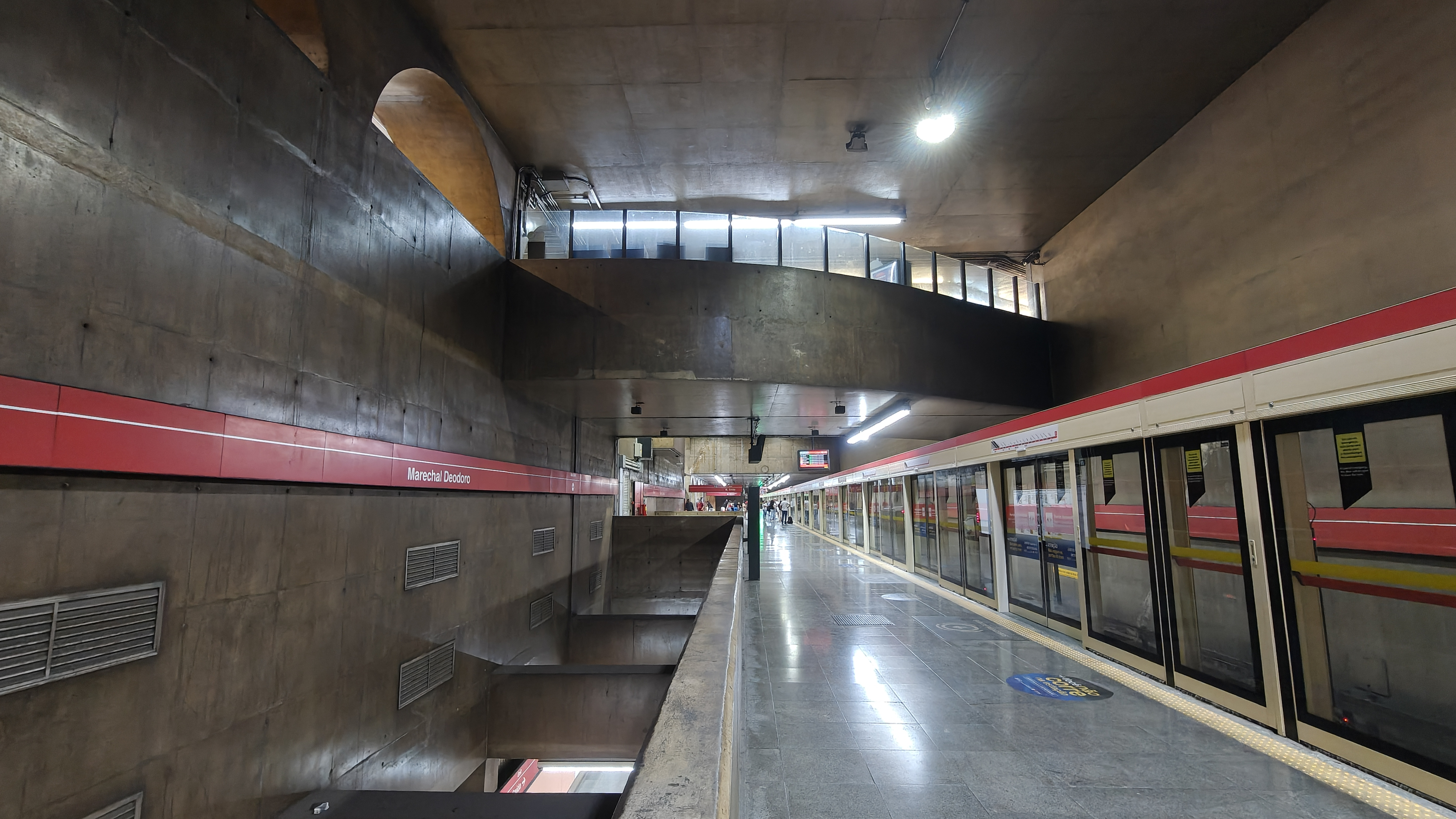
- Upper platform of Marechal Deodoro Station

General information
- Location: São Paulo; Brazil
- Coordinates: 23°32′02″S 46°39′21″W
- Owner: Government of the State of São Paulo
- Operator: Companhia do Metropolitano de São Paulo
- Platforms: Split platforms

Construction
- Structure type: underground
- Accessible: Y

Other information
- Station code: DEO

History
- Opened: December 17, 1988

Passengers
- 27,000/business day

Services
Preceding station	São Paulo Metro	Following station
Palmeiras-Barra Funda towards Palmeiras–Barra Funda	Line 3	Santa Cecília towards Corinthians-Itaquera
Track layout
Upper level
Lower level
Location

Marechal Deodoro is a station on Line 3 (Red) of the São Paulo Metro.
