= K stock =

K stock may refer to:

- London Underground K Stock
- MTR K-Stock EMU, also known as Rotem EMU
- São Paulo Metro K stock
