= Artur Alvim (São Paulo Metro) =

São Paulo Metro station

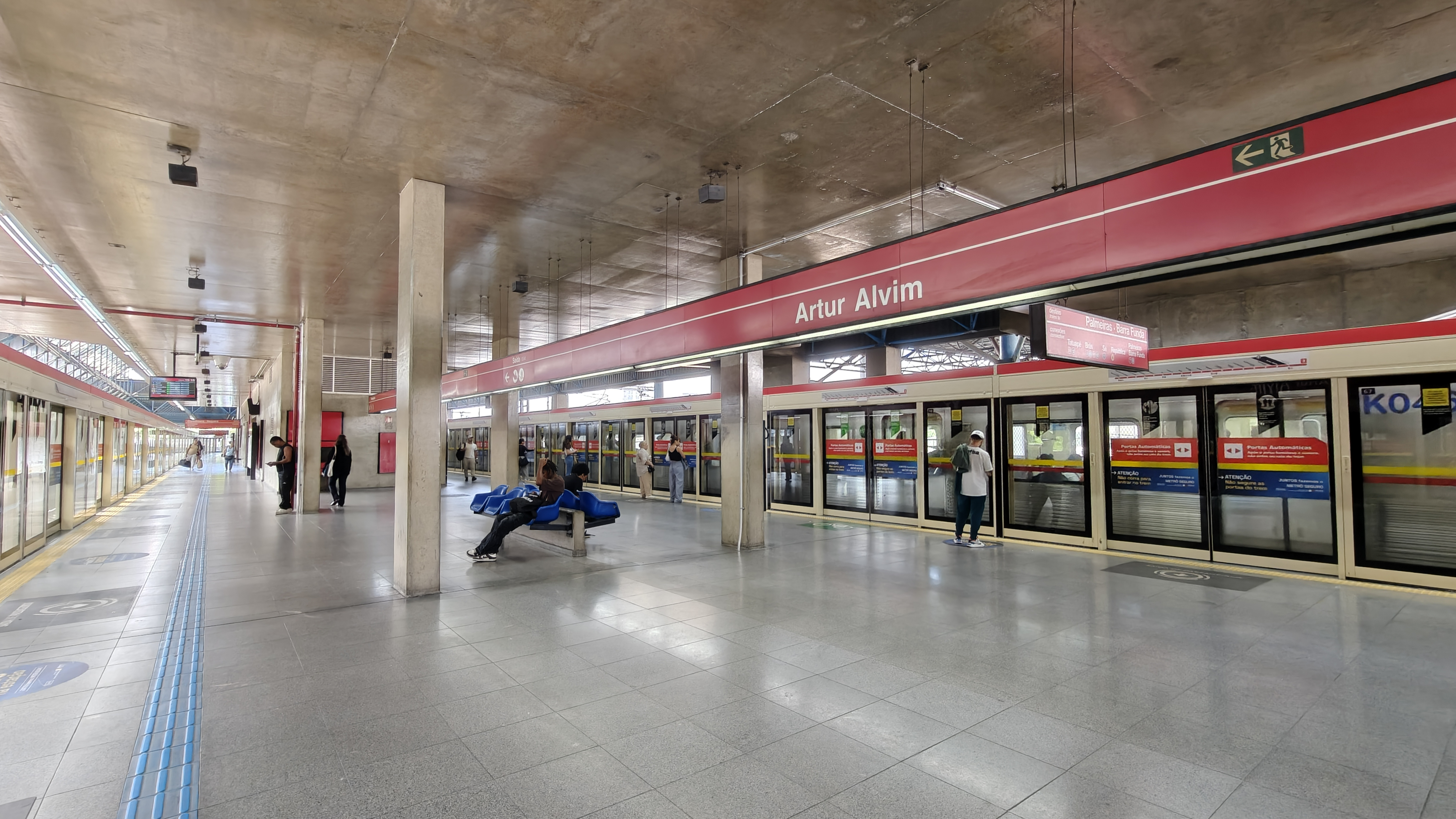

General information
- Location: São Paulo; Brazil
- Coordinates: 23°32′26″S 46°29′03″W
- Owner: Government of the State of São Paulo
- Operator: Companhia do Metropolitano de São Paulo
- Platforms: Island platforms
- Connections: North Artur Alvim Bus Terminal; South Artur Alvim Bus Terminal

Construction
- Structure type: Semi-elevated
- Accessible: y

Other information
- Station code: ART

History
- Opened: September 17, 1988

Passengers
- 55,000/business day

Services
Preceding station	São Paulo Metro	Following station
Patriarca-Vila Ré towards Palmeiras–Barra Funda	Line 3	Corinthians-Itaquera Terminus
Track layout
Location

Artur Alvim is a station on Line 3 (Red) of the São Paulo Metro.

== SPTrans Lines ==
The following SPTrans and EMTU bus routes can be accessed. Passengers may use a Bilhete Único card for transfer:

Line
262/TRO
2060/10
2702/10
2702/21
2724/10
2725/10
2727/10
2730/10
2732/10
273D/10
273G/10
273L/10
273R/10
273U/10
273X/10
273X/21
273X/41
273X/51
3718/10
3721/10
3728/10
3728/41
3734/10
3735/10
3735/21
3736/10
3791/10
