= List of São Paulo Metro yards =

List of rail yards

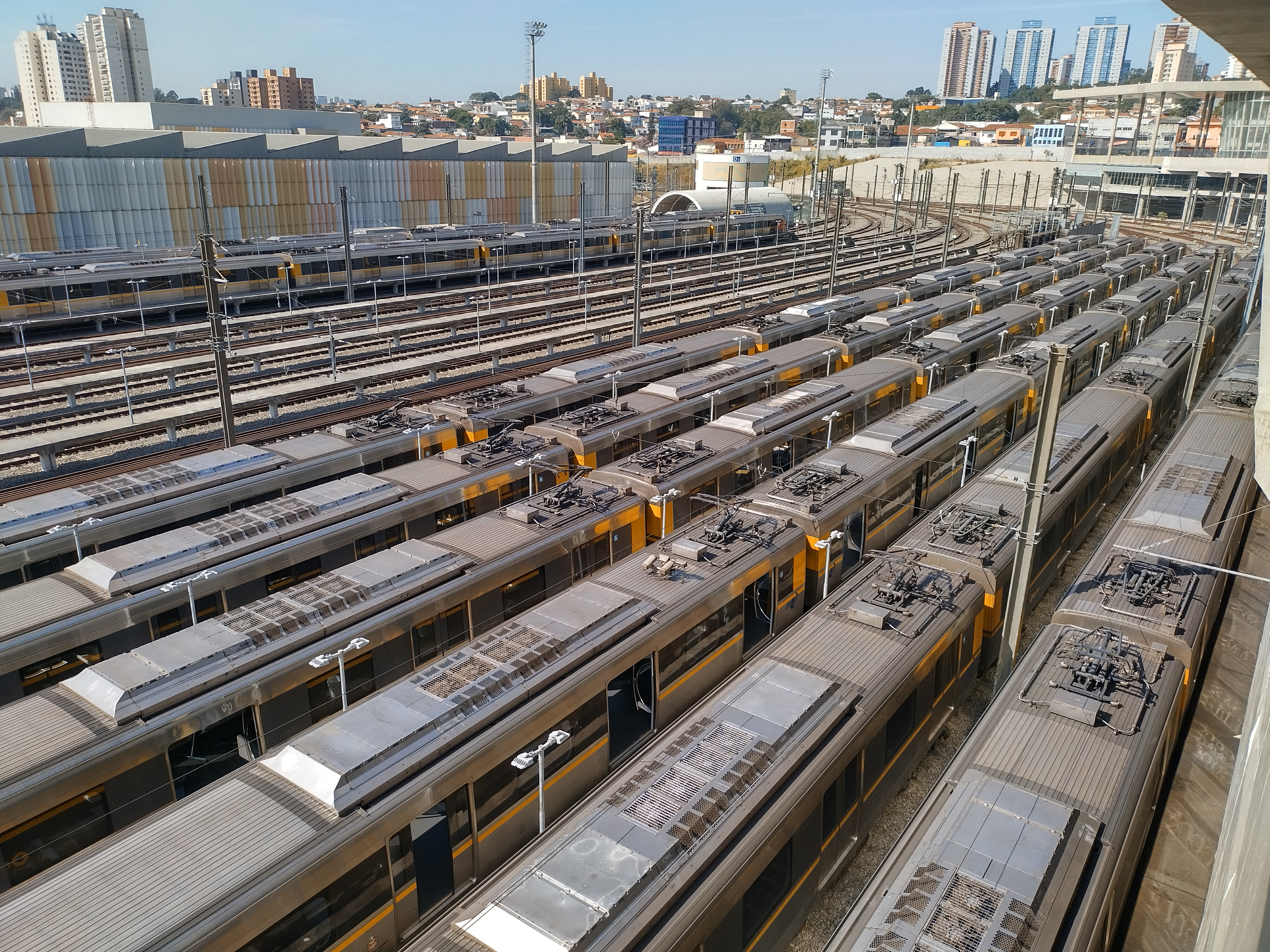
Parked trains in the Vila Sônia Rail Yard

The São Paulo Metro operates a total of 8 rail yards, with at least 5 more in planning or construction. The Companhia Paulista de Trens Metropolitanos operates a further 12 yards, all of which combine to serve commuter trains in the Greater São Paulo region.

== Line 1 (Blue) ==
=== Jabaquara yard ===
The Jabaquara yard, serving Line 1 of the São Paulo Metro, saw its construction start in 1971. Occupying an area of 330,000m², it can fit 52 trains and has specific buildings for maintenance operations such as for washing and performing repairs, and hosts the Metro's corporate university.

== Line 2 (Green) ==
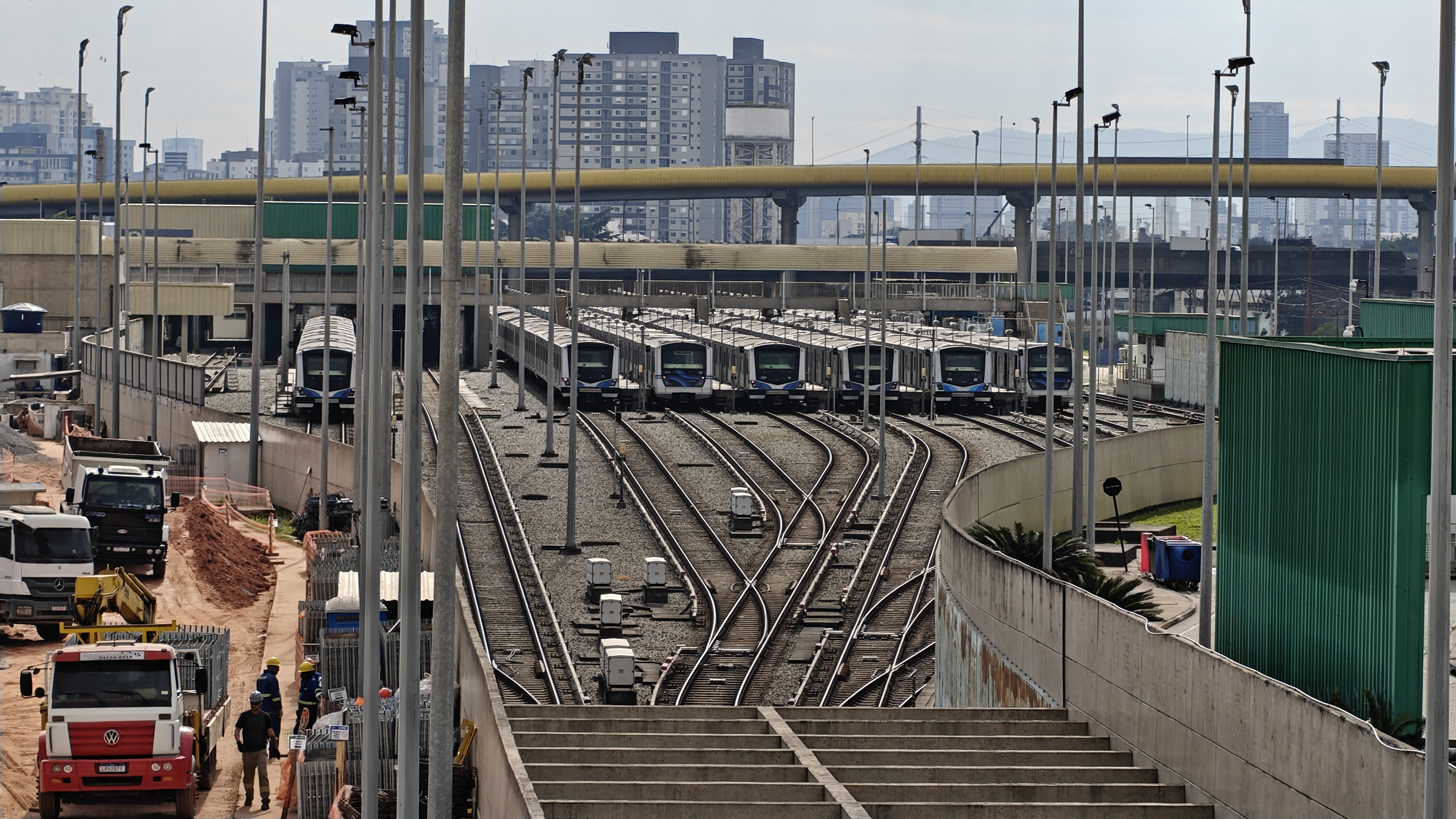
View of Tamanduateí metro yard, adjacent to Tamanduateí metro station

=== Tamanduateí yard ===
Small yard for routine maintenance operations. Line 2 also makes use of rail yards in other Metro lines, such as the Jabaquara yard.

=== Paulo Freire yard ===
In planning phase. Line 2's proposed extension to the Penha station meant its fleet had to be increased, thus requiring a new, dedicated rail yard. Construction contract is expected for 2023.

== Line 3 (Red) ==
=== Itaquera yard ===
The Metro's biggest rail yard, has an area of 470,000m² and 24 km of railways, with the capacity to store 60 trains. Divided into several blocks, their functionalities include maintenance facilities, workshops, electrical substations, and administrative buildings. The Itaquera yard was inaugurated in 1987 and is located near the Corinthians-Itaquera station.

The Red Line also crosses the Brás rail yard, belonging to the CPTM.

=== Belém yard ===
Originally intended as a provisional yard to park trains whilst the Itaquera yard was under construction, the EPB (Estacionamento Provisório do Belém) ended up being integrated as a definitive rail yard providing maintenance and cleaning for both CPTM and Metro trains.

== Line 4 (Yellow) ==
=== Vila Sônia yard ===
The Line 4 of the São Paulo Metro operates its fleet from the Vila Sônia yard since 2016, despite the 7-year delay on the Vila Sônia station's completion, originally proposed for 2014. The Vila Sônia yard also hosts Line 4's Command and Control centre, vital for GoA4 operations.

== Line 5 (Lilac) ==
=== Capão Redondo yard ===
The Capão Redondo yard has an area of 75,000m². Before the Guido Caloi yard's completion, it was the only rail yard operating in Line 5. Line 5's Command and Control centre is also located in this rail yard.

=== Guido Caloi yard ===
Opened in 2019, the Guido Caloi yard covers an area of 102,000m² and has 11 km of railways. It was originally intended to provide maintenance for Line 19's trains as well, but the idea was eventually scrapped following changes in planning around the Campo Belo station.

== Line 6 (Orange) ==
=== Morro Grande yard ===
Line 6's dedicated rail yard, currently being built by Acciona, with its completion expected for 2025. The Morro Grande Yard's location was originally a quarry, and was filled with water prior to the construction starting.

== Line 15 (Silver) ==
=== Oratório yard ===
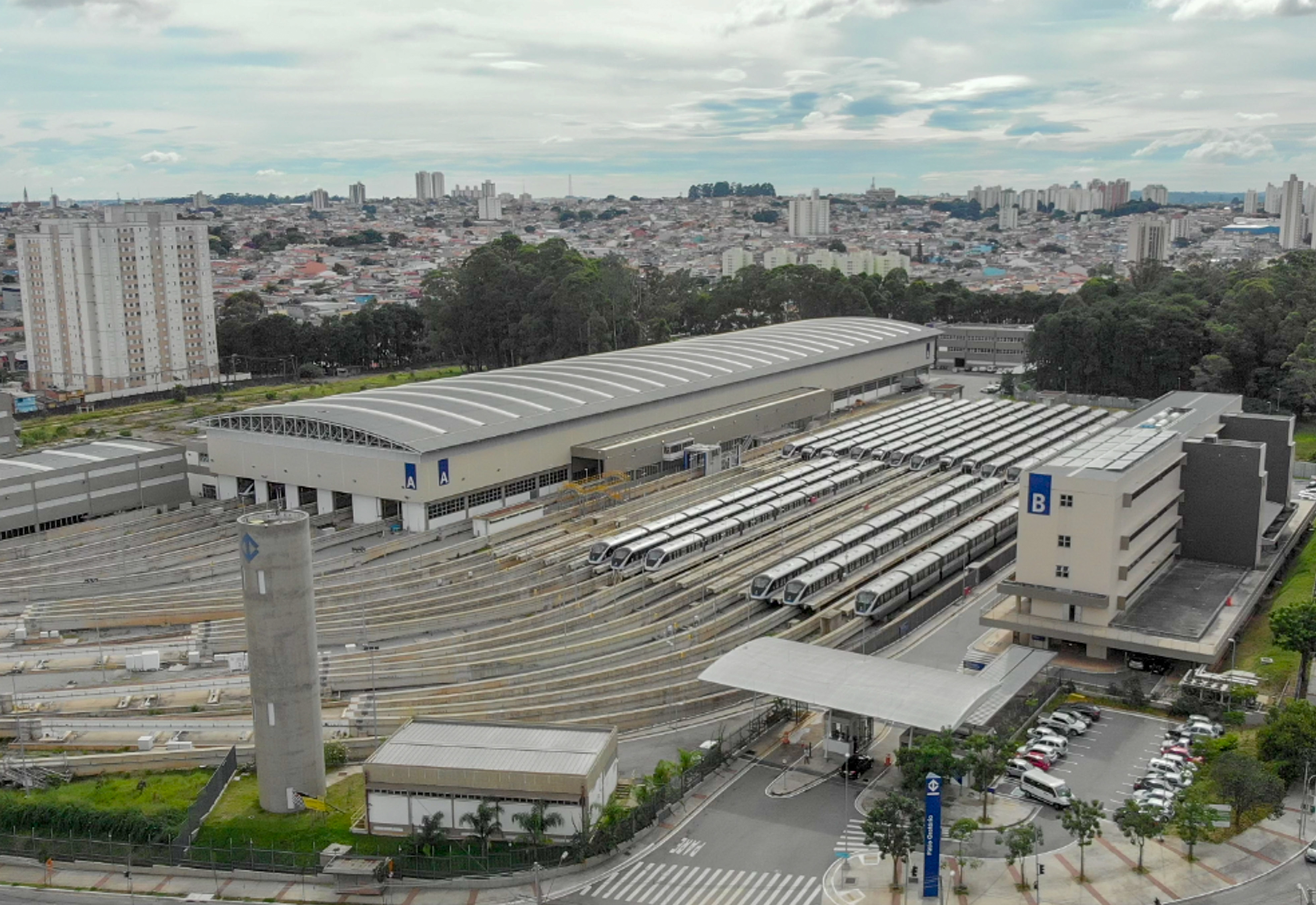
Bombardier monorails in the Oratório yard.

Covering 60,000m², the Oratório yard is used for maintenance of the monorails in the Line 15. With the line's future expansion, its responsibilities will be shared with the Ragueb Chohfi Yard.

=== Ragueb Chohfi yard ===
To be located near the Jacu-Pêssego station, will be capable of fitting 27 trains, just like the Oratório yard. Thus, its completion would allow Line 15 to run up to 54 monorails in the section between Ipiranga and Cidade Tiradentes.

== Line 16 (Violet) ==
=== Henry Ford yard ===
Planned for a 160,400m² area alongside Henry Ford Avenue in the Mooca subprefecture.

== Line 17 (Gold) ==
=== Água Espraiada yard ===
Planned for 2026, the Água Espraiada yard is to provide parking and maintenance services to BYD SkyRail trains of Line 17, meant to connect the stations of Morumbi, Washington Luís and the Congonhas Airport.

== Line 19 (Sky Blue) ==
=== Vila Medeiros yard ===
Planned for the Line 19 (Sky Blue).

== Line 20 (Pink) ==
=== Santa Marina yard ===
Planned for the Line 20 (Pink). Will be situated in a 258,000m² area between Ermano Marchetti Avenue and Line 7 of the CPTM, running alongside Santa Marina Avenue. The stabling yard will occupy an area of 183,000m² and feature 24 train slots.
