= Lapa (Line 8) (CPTM) =

Railway station in São Paulo, Brazil

Lapa–Senac
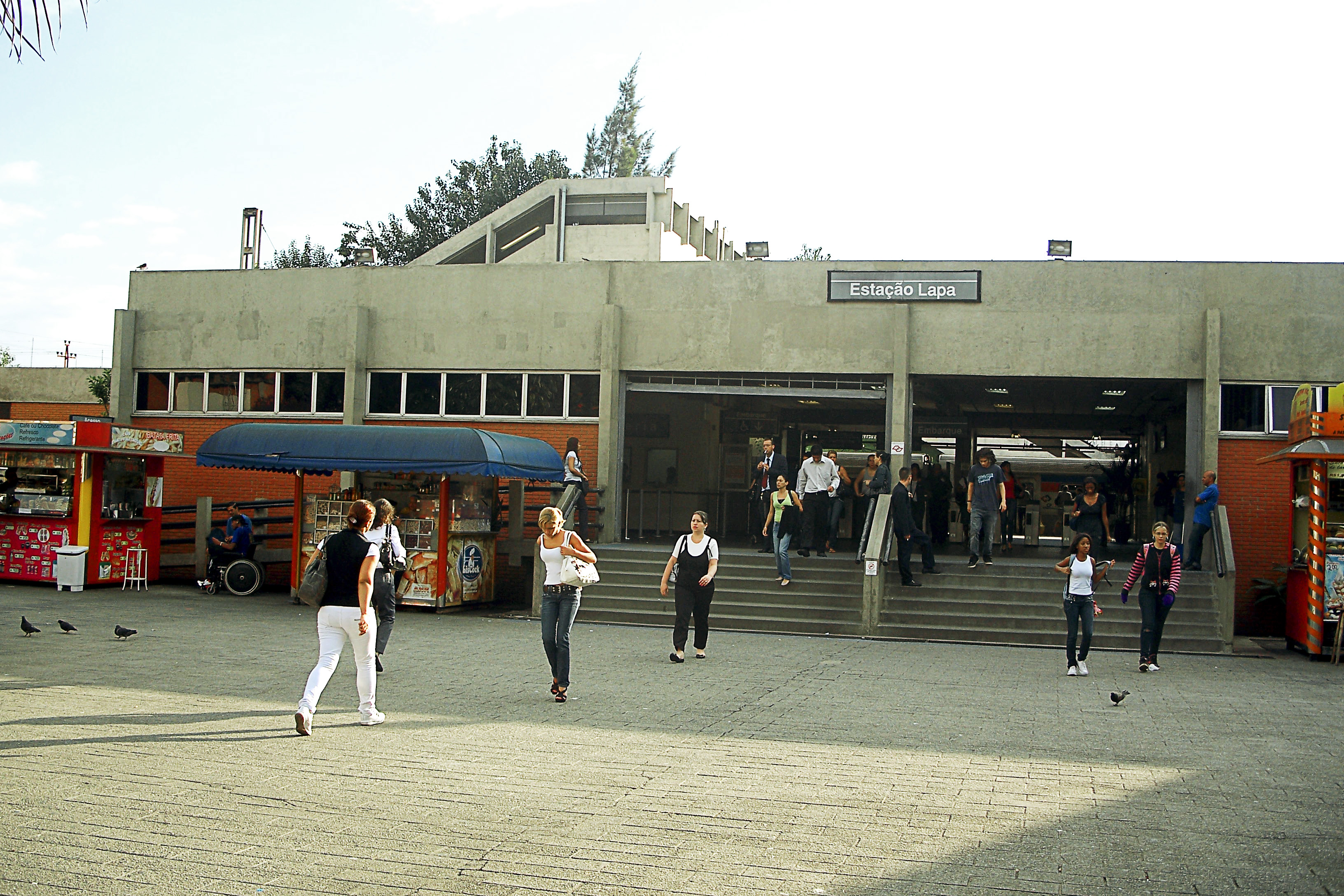
- Entrance of the station

General information
- Location: R. Guaicurus, 1438; Lapa; Brazil
- Coordinates: 23.520109°S 46.698917°W
- Owner: Government of the State of São Paulo
- Operator: ViaMobilidade Linhas 8 e 9 (Motiva)
- Platforms: Side platforms
- Connections: Lapa Bus Terminal

Construction
- Structure type: At-grade

Other information
- Station code: LAB

History
- Opened: 1 June 1958; 68 years ago
- Rebuilt: 25 January 1979; 47 years ago
- Former names: Km 7

Services
Preceding station	São Paulo Metropolitan Trains	Following station
Domingos de Moraes towards Amador Bueno	Line 8	Palmeiras-Barra Funda towards Júlio Prestes
Future out-of-system interchange
Preceding station	São Paulo Metro	Following station
Terminus	Line 20 (proposed)	Vila Romana towards Pref. Celso Daniel-Santo André
Track layout
Location

Lapa, also known as Lapa–Senac for sponsorship reasons and originally named Km 7, is a train station on ViaMobilidade Linhas 8 e 9 Line 8-Diamond, located in the district of Lapa in São Paulo.

== History ==
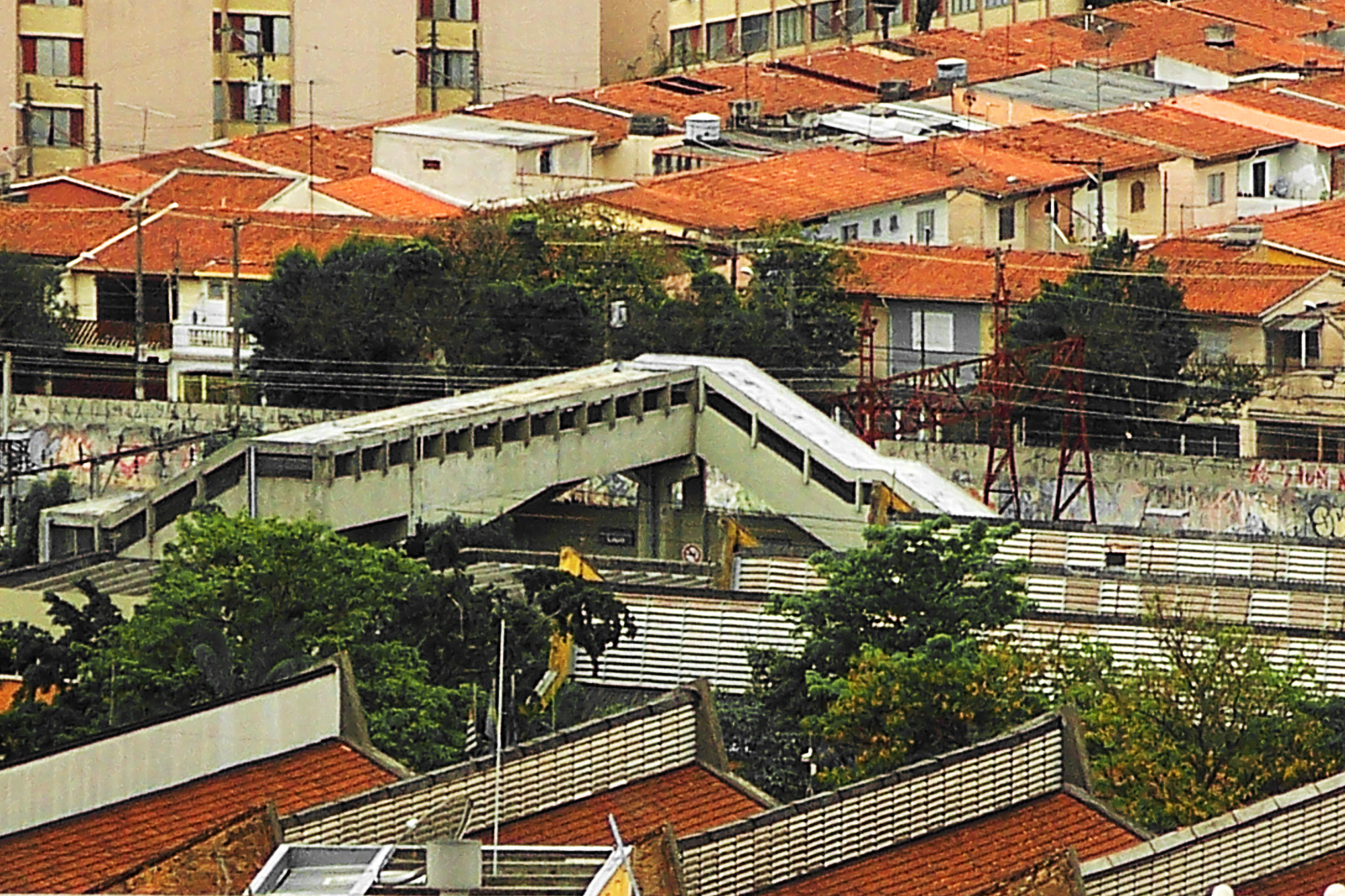
Footbridge above the station platforms

With the arrival of the railways of São Paulo Railway in 1867 and Estrada de Ferro Sorocabana in 1875 to the region of Lapa, the English railway implanted the first station in the neighbourhood. Because of that, Sorocabana couldn't build their station, due to legal affairs. Therefore, Sorocabana had to wait until the end of the SPR concession to build their station. In 1951, a small post was implemented to help the Lapa Tendal. At the time, the then City Councillor Nicolau Tuma suggested the construction of a new unified Lapa Station, being the first of many suggestion that would be presented in the following decades.

With the demand growth, a new building was built and opened on 1 June 1958, with the name of Km 7. However the construction works were only finished in 1961.

In the end of the 1970s, the old station was demolished, giving place for a new station, built by Christian-Nielsen Engenheiros e Construtores, hired by FEPASA and reopened on 6 July 1985. The station, along with the entire line, was transferred to CPTM, which operated it until 2022, when it was auctioned with Line 9-Diamond to ViaMobilidade.

=== Projects ===
Due to the existence of two Lapa stations, separated for 500 metres (1,600 ft) and without connection with each other, two project to unify the stations were made:

- In 1978, São Paulo Metropolitan Company projected the west expansion of the East-West Line with Pompeia station and the terminus in Lapa station, which would be rebuilt, with connection from the Metro to the FEPASA and RFFSA commuter train lines, and would count with a bus terminal attached to it. Because of the lack of funds, the project was cancelled, and the line had its terminus in Barra Funda station.
- In 2010, CPTM hired, along with Una Arquitetos, a project to unify Lapa stations. The project was influenced by the project of the burial of Lapa-Brás branch. It hasn't been executed yet.
