= Line 3 (São Paulo Metro) =

São Paulo Metro Line 3 (Red)

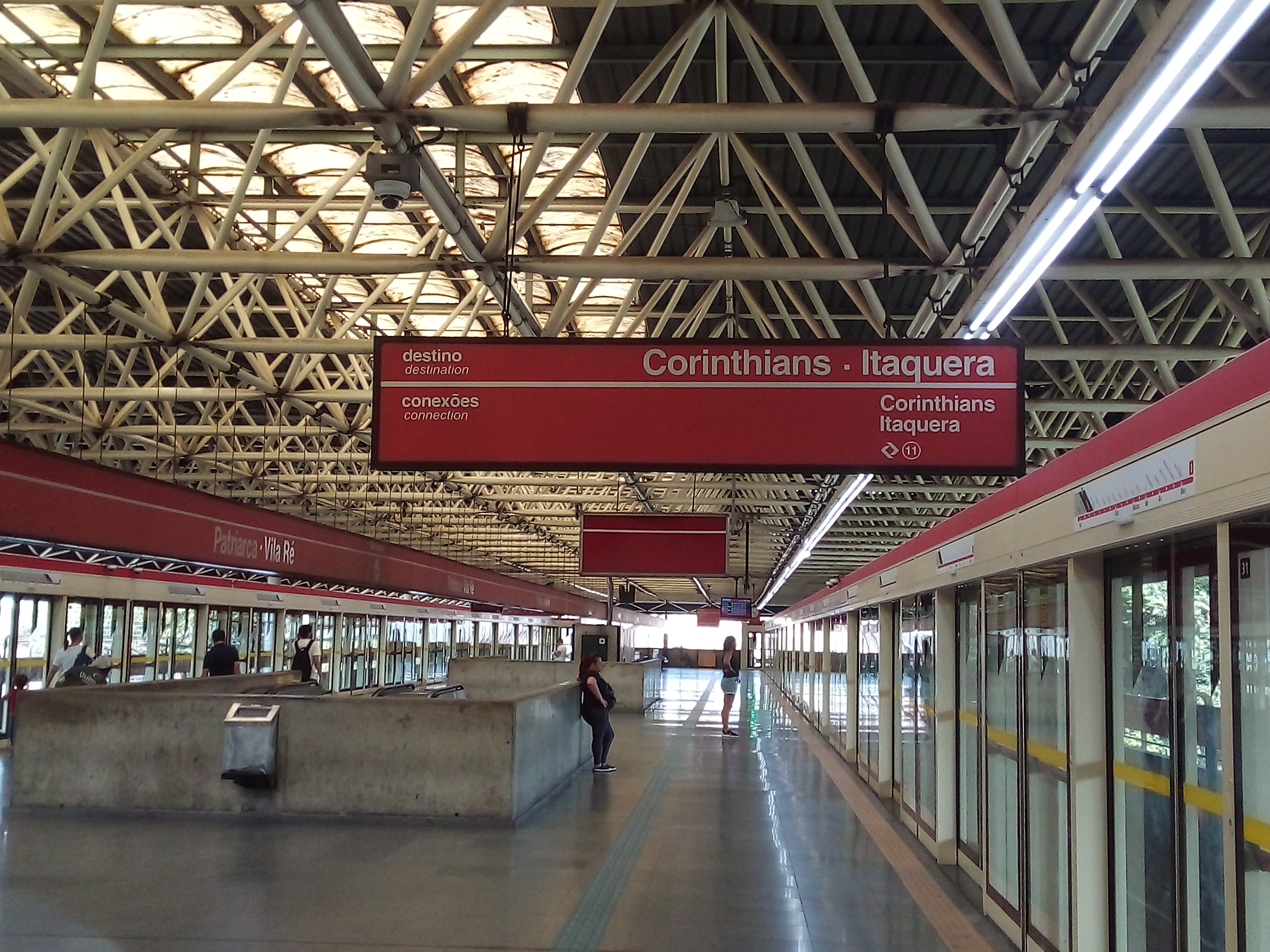
- Patriarca - Vila Ré station

Overview
- Status: Operational
- Owner: Government of the State of São Paulo
- Locale: São Paulo, Brazil
- Termini: Palmeiras–Barra Funda; Corinthians–Itaquera
- Connecting lines: Current: Future: Planned: 19
- Stations: 18; 1 in project

Service
- Type: Rapid transit
- System: São Paulo Metro
- Operator(s): CMSP
- Depot(s): Belém rail yard Itaquera rail yard
- Rolling stock: 96 Alstom G stock (16 trains); 102 CAF H stock (17 trains); 150 T'Trans/MPE/Temoinsa K stock (25 trains)
- Daily ridership: 823,000/business day

History
- Commenced: 1975
- Opened: 10 March 1979; 47 years ago
- Last extension: 17 December 1988

Technical
- Line length: 22 km (14 mi)
- Track gauge: 1,600 mm (5 ft 3 in)
- Electrification: 750 V DC third rail
- Operating speed: 87 km/h (54 mph)
- Signalling: Automatic block signaling Alstom Urbalis CBTC (in tests)

Line 3 (Red) (Portuguese: Linha 3–Vermelha) is one of the six lines that make up the São Paulo Metro and one of the thirteen lines that make up the Metropolitan Rail Transportation Network. It runs between Palmeiras-Barra Funda and Corinthians-Itaquera. It was formerly called the East-West Line. Line 3 is the busiest in the system.

== History ==
This line, initially called the East-West line, was only planned to be 7 kilometres (4.3 mi) long, connecting the Casa Verde and Vila Maria districts of São Paulo, passing through the center of Barra Funda, Sé, and Tatuapé, and be completely underground. But after a lengthy debate, it was decided that it would be constructed on the surface, taking advantage of the old Rede Ferroviária Federal train bed and sharing 23 kilometres (14 mi) of its lines—a move that prevented many expropriations.

Construction began in 1972. With this design change, the East-West line would then be more than 30 kilometres (19 mi) long between Praça da Sé and Guaianases, parallel to the railroad tracks. The stretch between Guaianases and Calmon Viana, in Poá was planned to be built in a second phase, making full use the rail bed. The strength of this design change would be a cost equivalent to one third of the original budget. Because of international trends that dictate that the rail for metro systems used for urban transport be made exclusive to the metro, the design was changed again.

It was up to the Rede Ferroviária Federal (predecessor of CPTM) to modernize this passage. For this reason, the line opened already overloaded. Once this impasse was resolved, construction began on the western section. On March 10, 1979 the first stretch, between Sé and Brás stations was opened. In the west, the line ended in Barra Funda. The current configuration is the same since 1988. The current record demand was made on November 7, 2008, with the transport of 1,468,935 people. On May 2–3, 2009 the stretch between Anhangabaú and Santa Cecília stations was closed to allow for the use of a tunnel boring machine being used for the extension project of Line 4 (Yellow). In 2010 work began on the installation of glass doors on the Line 3 platforms, starting with the Vila Matilde, Carrão and Penha stations.

== Expansion ==
An expansion is planned from Palmeiras-Barra Funda to Água Branca, where the subway line is going to meet the future project of interurban trains lines.

== Stations ==
Code	Station	Platforms	Position	Connections	District
BFU	Palmeiras–Barra Funda	Island and side platforms	At-grade	Barra Funda Bus Terminal; Barra Funda Road Terminal	Barra Funda
DEO	Marechal Deodoro	Split platforms	Underground	-	Santa Cecília
CEC	Santa Cecília	Side platforms	Underground	Amaral Gurgel Bus Terminal	Santa Cecília
REP	República	Island and side platforms	Underground	Line 4 (São Paulo Metro)	República
GBU	Anhangabaú	Island platform	Underground	19 (Planned); Bandeira Bus Terminal; Campo Limpo–Rebouças–Centro Bus Corridor; Pirituba–Lapa–Centro Bus Corridor; Santo Amaro–9 de Julho–Centro Bus Corridor	República and Sé
PSE	Sé	Island and side platforms	Underground	Line 1 (São Paulo Metro)	Sé
PDS	Pedro II	Side platforms	Elevated	Expresso Tiradentes	Sé
BAS	Brás	Island and side platforms	Elevated	Brás Bus Terminal	Brás
BRE	Bresser–Mooca	Island platform	At-grade	-	Brás
BEL	Belém	Island platform	At-grade	North Belém Bus Terminal; South Belém Bus Terminal	Belém
TAT	Tatuapé	Island and side platforms	At-grade	North Tatuapé Bus Terminal; South Tatuapé Bus Terminal	Tatuapé
CAR	Carrão	Island platform	At-grade	North Carrão Bus Terminal; South Carrão Bus Terminal	Tatuapé
PEN	Penha	Island platform	At-grade	(Future) (Future); Penha Bus Terminal	Penha
VTD	Vila Matilde	Island platform	At-grade	Vila Matilde Bus Terminal	Vila Matilde
VPA	Guilhermina–Esperança	Island platform	At-grade	-	Vila Matilde
PCA	Patriarca–Vila Ré	Island platform	Partially elevated	Patriarca Bus Terminal	Vila Matilde and Penha
ART	Artur Alvim	Island platform	At-grade	North Artur Alvim Bus Terminal; South Artur Alvim Bus Terminal	Artur Alvim
ITQ	Corinthians–Itaquera	Island and side platforms	Elevated	(Planned); Itaquera Bus Terminal	Itaquera

== Gallery ==
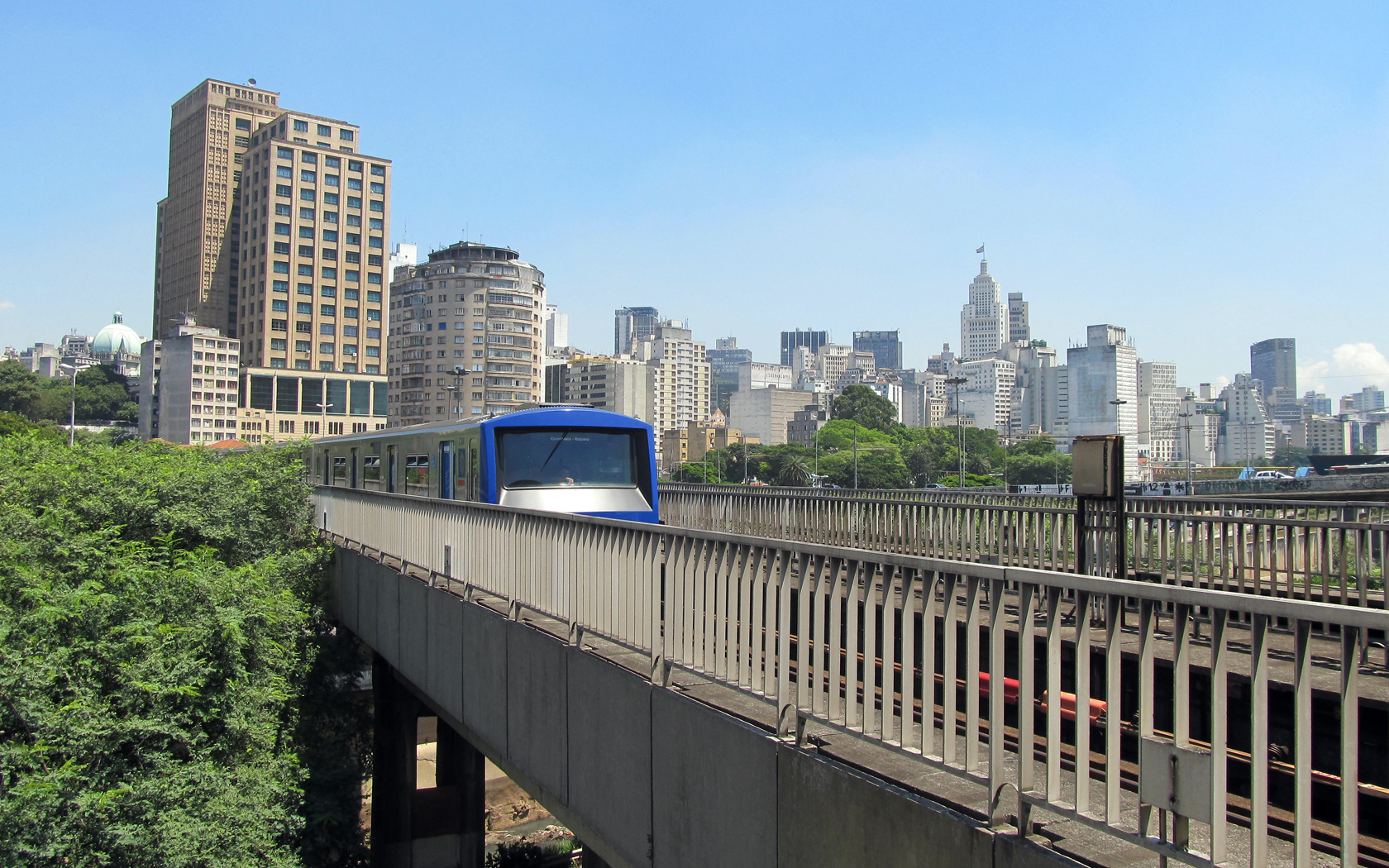
Train leaving the city's center

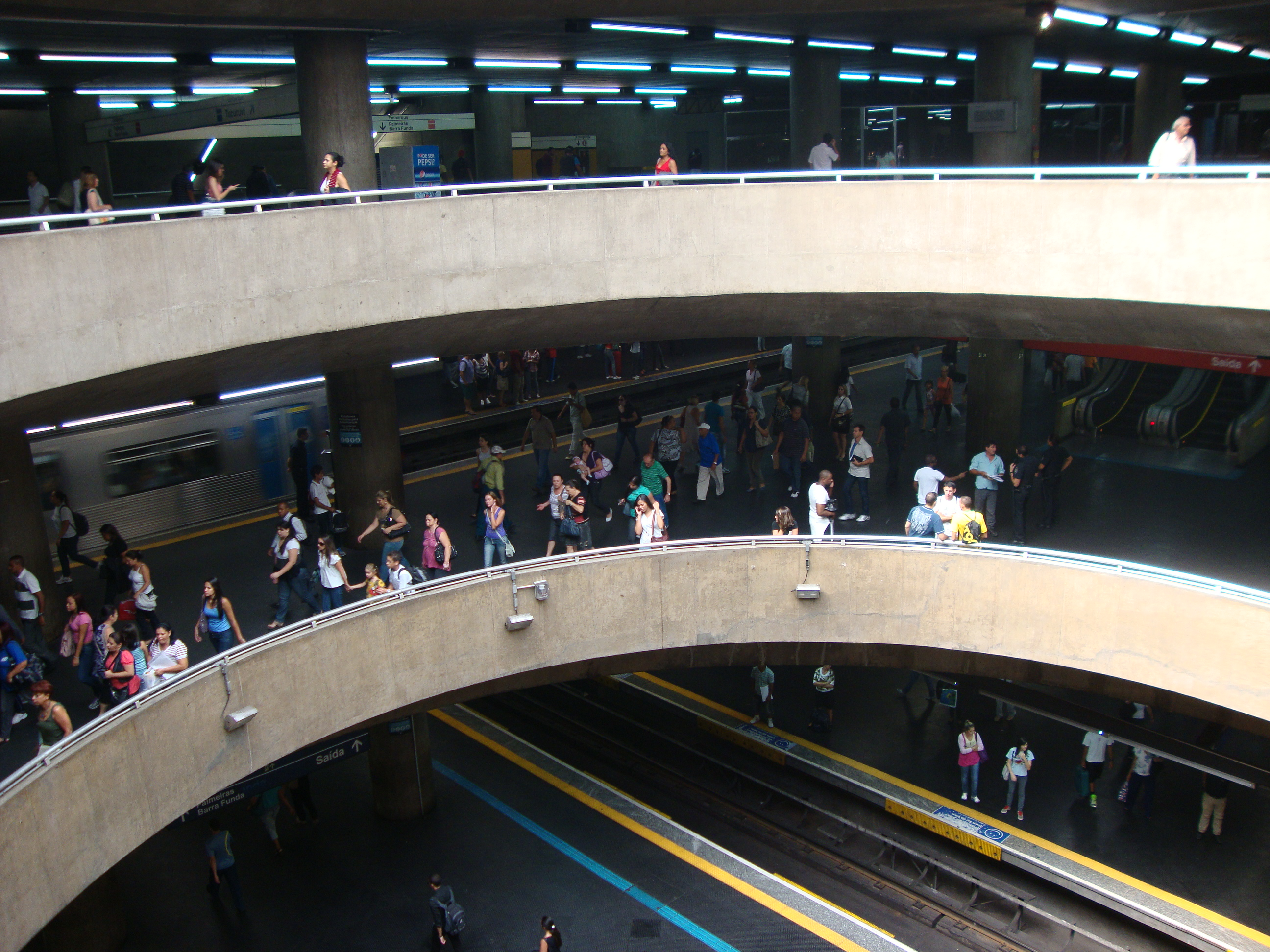
Sé Station, the system's busiest

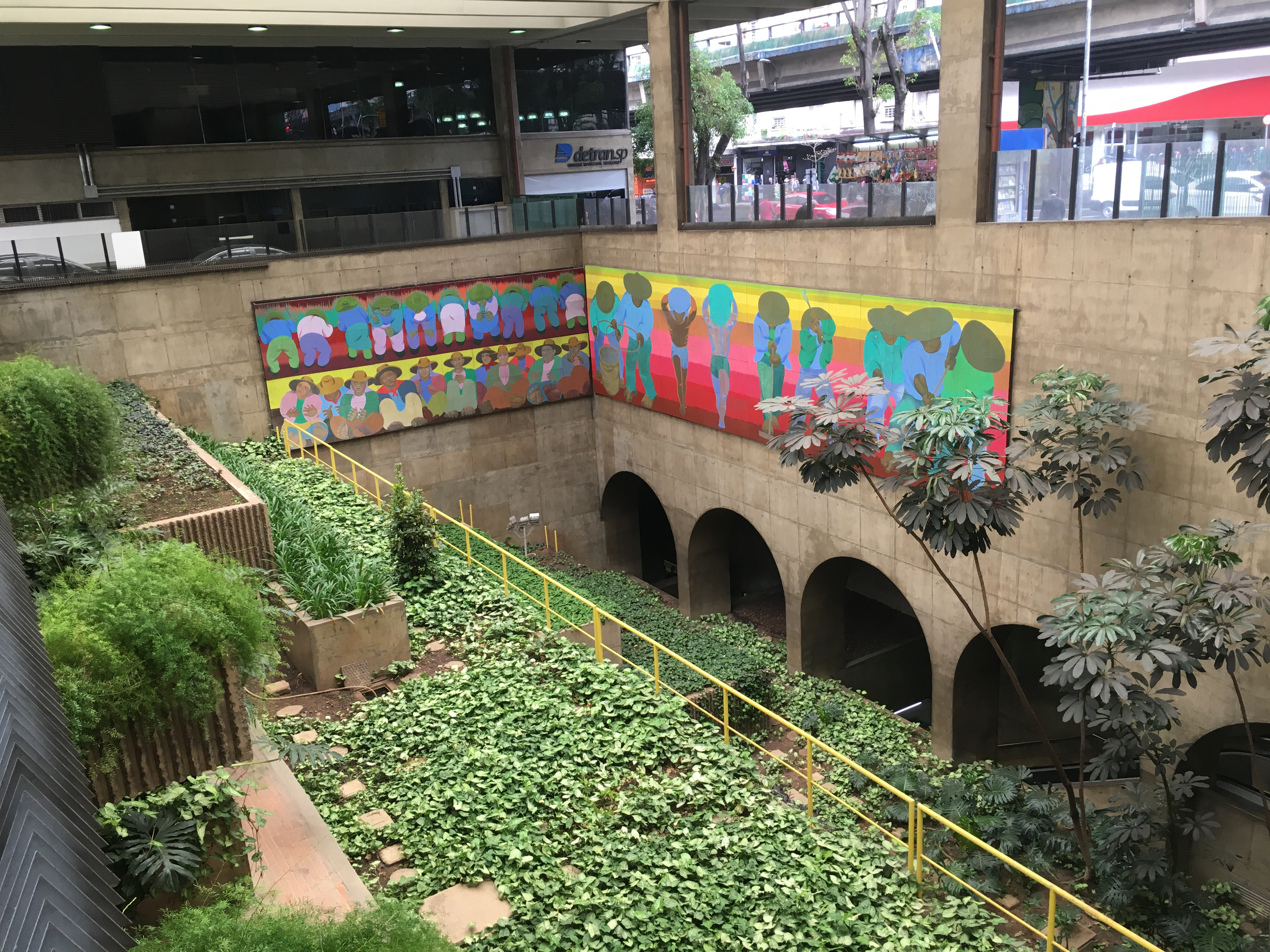
Marechal Deodoro Station

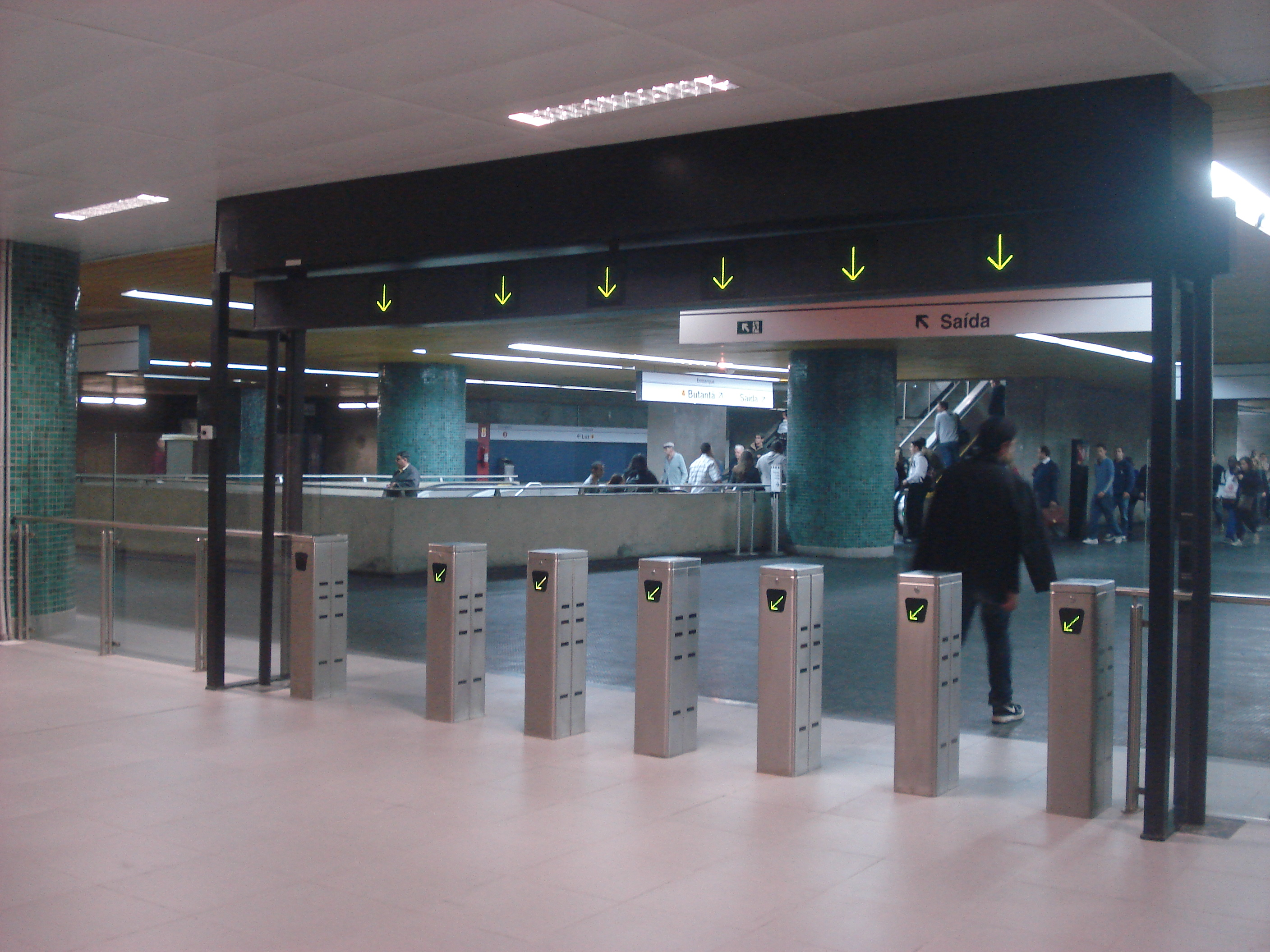
República Station

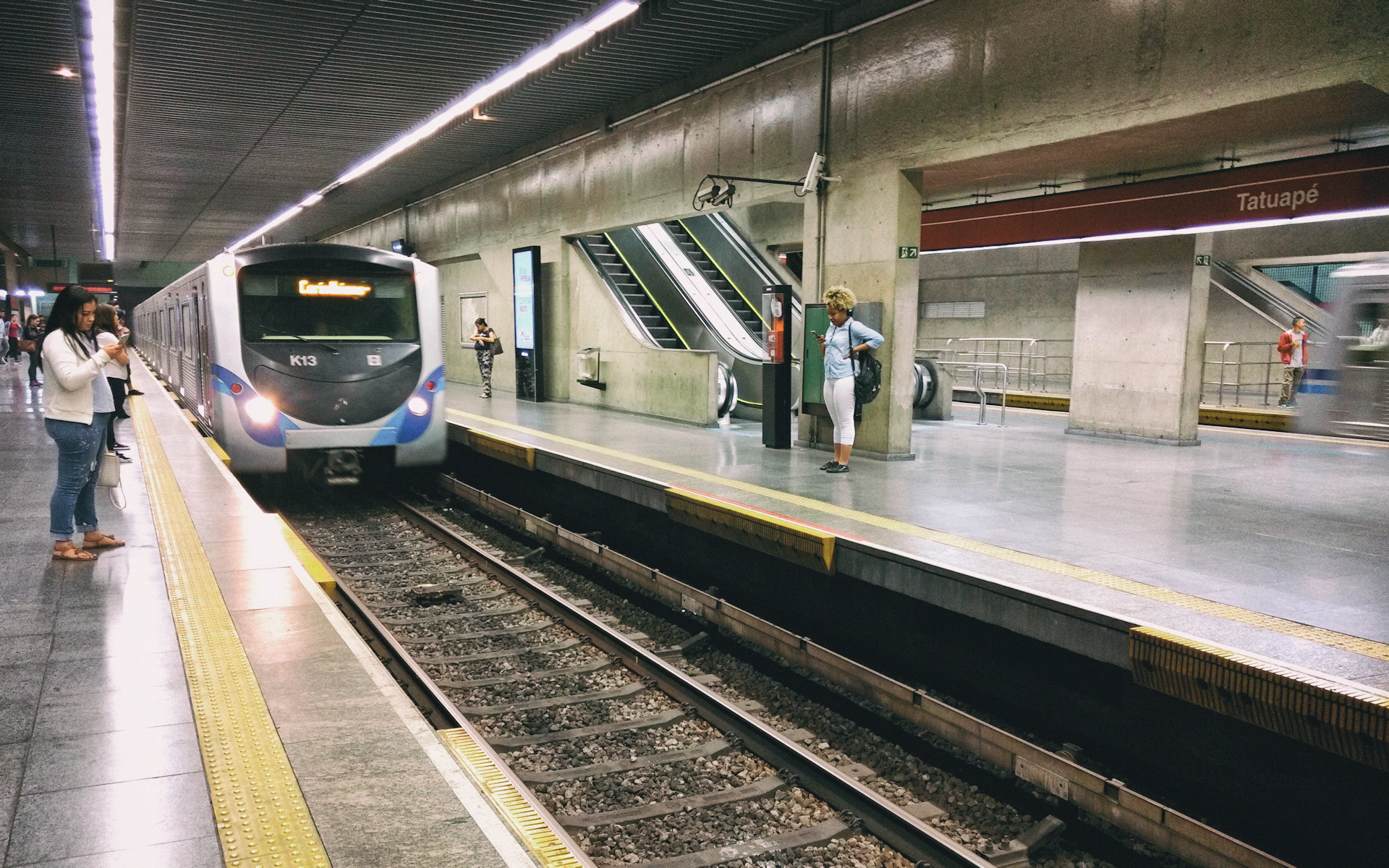
Tatuapé Station

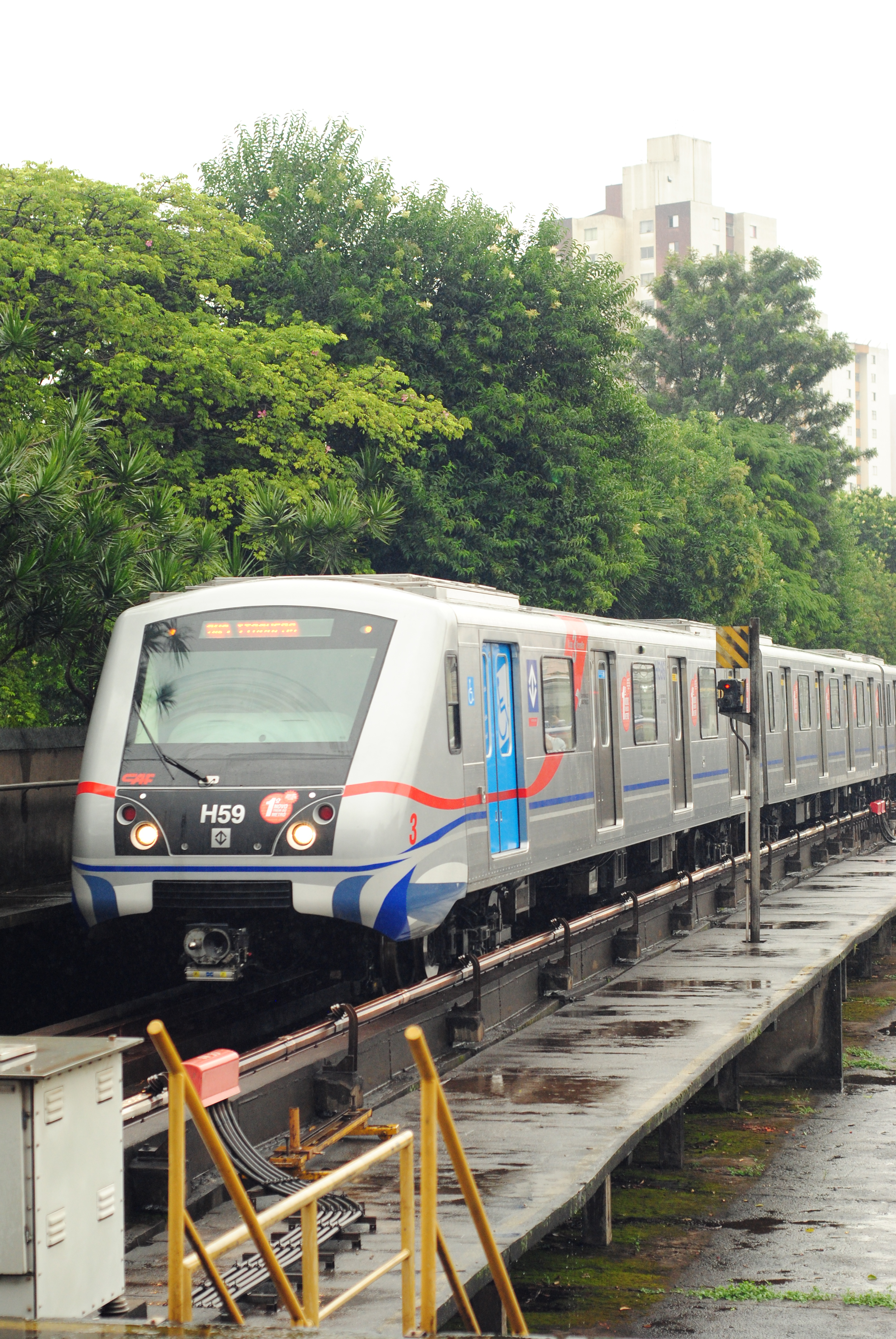
CAF H fleet train in Line 3-Red

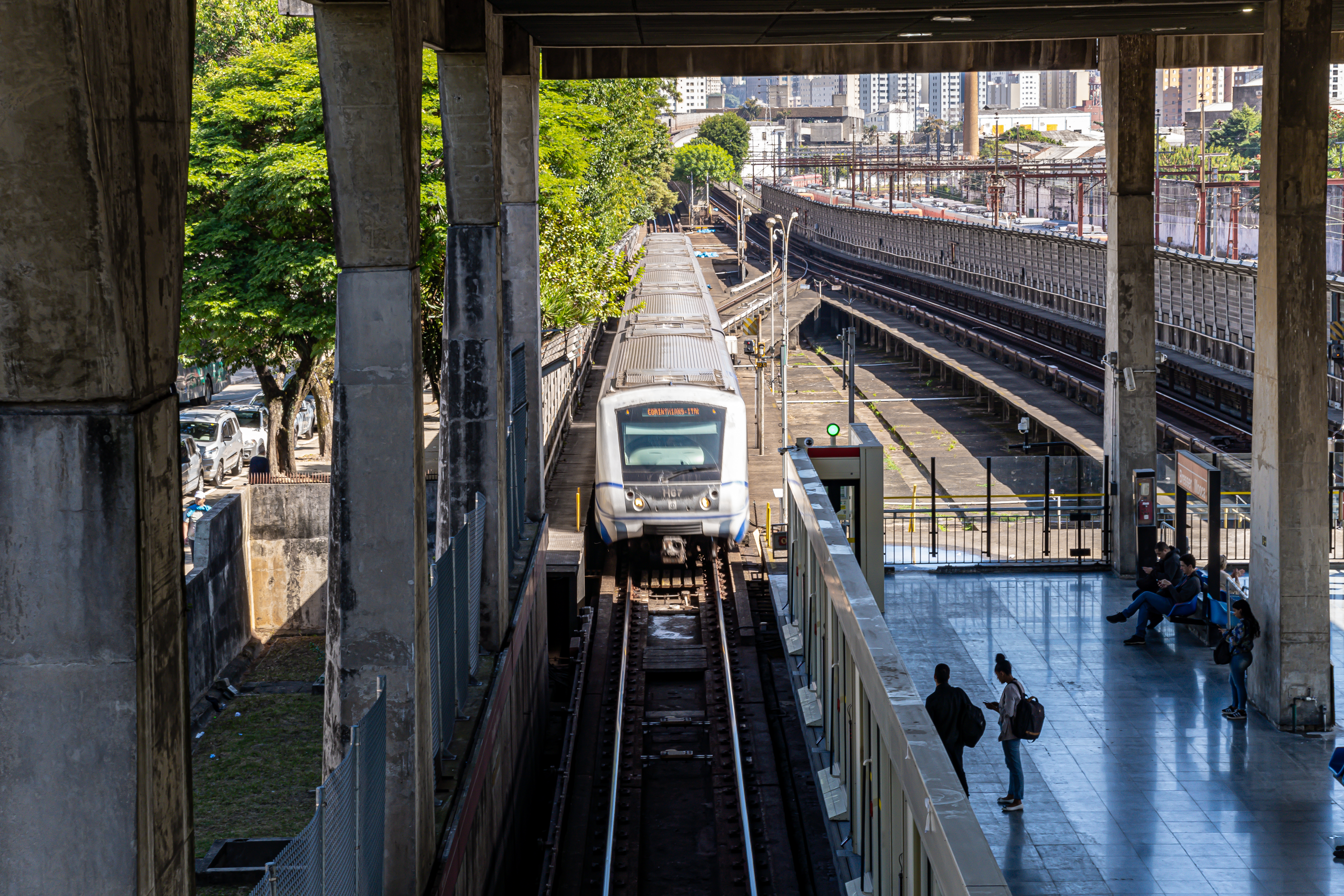
CAF H67 fleet train heading to Bresser-Mooca station
