= Edgard Frankignoul =

Belgian inventor

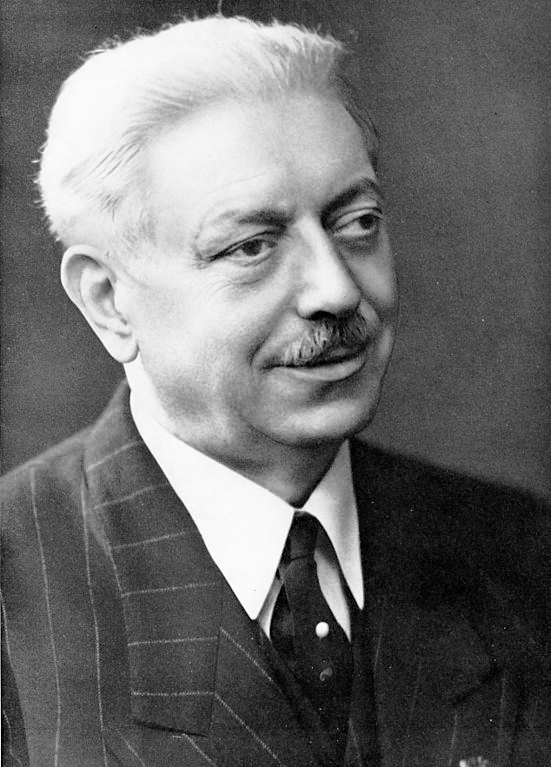
Edgard Frankignoul

Edgard Frankignoul (1882–1954) was a Belgian inventor.
