= São Paulo Metro K stock =

São Paulo metro train stock class

K stock
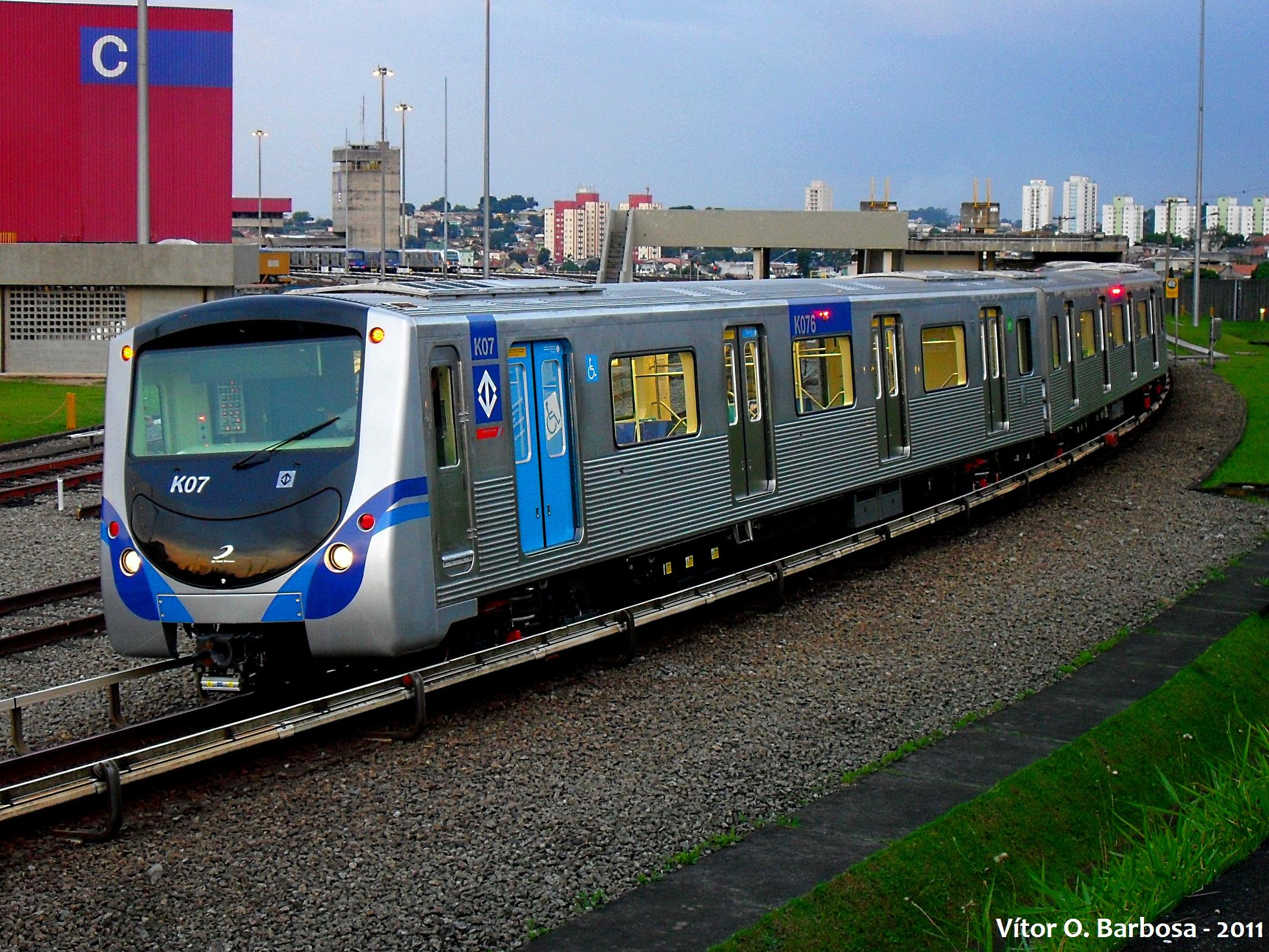
- A K07 train in tests at Itaquera Yard

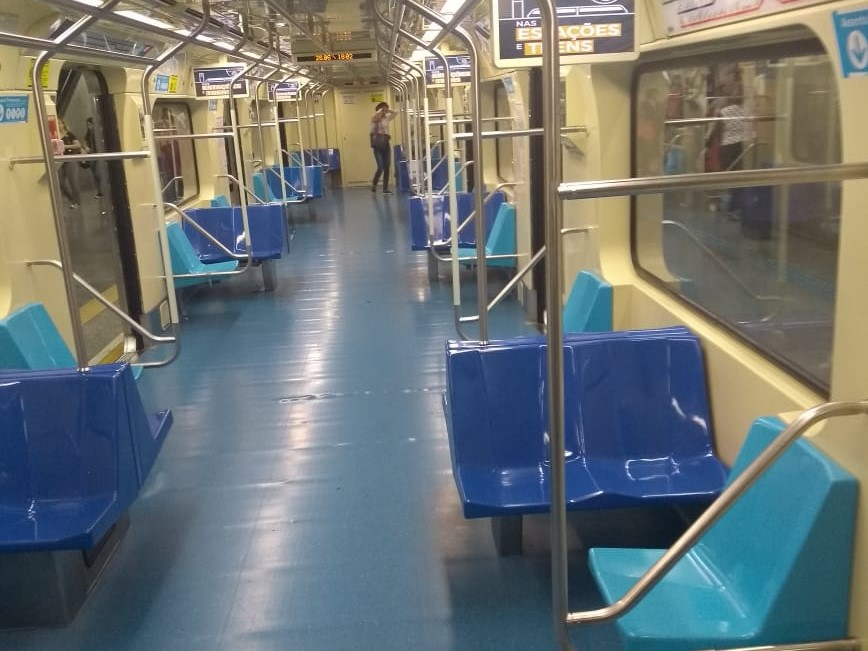
- In service: 1984–present
- Manufacturer: Companhia Brasileira de Material Ferroviário
- Built at: Hortolândia, São Paulo; Três Rios, Rio de Janeiro
- Constructed: 1979–1986
- Entered service: 1984
- Refurbished: 2010–2014
- Number built: 25 sets
- Number in service: 24 sets
- Formation: 6-car sets (A–B–B–B–B–A)
- Fleet numbers: K01–K25
- Capacity: 2,070 (if 8 passengers/m²)
- Operator: São Paulo Metro
- Depots: Itaquera; Belém
- Line served: Line 3 (São Paulo Metro)

Specifications
- Car body construction: Stainless steel
- Train length: 130.05 m (426 ft 8 in)
- Car length: 21.75 m (71 ft 4 in)
- Width: 3.1 m (10 ft 2 in)
- Height: 3.62 m (11 ft 11 in)
- Floor height: 1,113 mm (3 ft 7.8 in)
- Platform height: 8 sets of side doors per car
- Entry: Level
- Maximum speed: 90 km/h (56 mph)
- Weight: 37,267 kg (82,160 lb) (A cars); 36,042 kg (79,459 lb) (B cars)
- Traction system: MEDCOM FT-350-750-D IGBT–VVVF
- Traction motors: 24 × Traktionssysteme Austria TME 50-16-4A/B or TME 43-18-4 220 kW (300 hp) asynchronous 3-phase AC
- Power output: 5,280 kW (7,080 hp)
- Acceleration: 1.12 m/s^{2} (3.7 ft/s^{2})
- Deceleration: 1.2 m/s^{2} (3.9 ft/s^{2}) (service); 1.5 m/s^{2} (4.9 ft/s^{2}) (emergency)
- HVAC: Air conditioning
- Electric systems: 750 V DC third rail
- Current collection: Contact shoe
- UIC classification: Bo′Bo′+Bo′Bo′+Bo′Bo′+Bo′Bo′+Bo′Bo′+Bo′Bo′
- Bogies: Hard "H"
- Braking systems: Regenerative and Rheostatic (in stations); Pneumatic (friction)
- Coupling system: N2 type (A cars)
- Track gauge: 1,600 mm (5 ft 3 in)

The São Paulo Metro K stock is a class of refurbished electric multiple units from C stock, originally built by Companhia Brasileira de Material Ferroviário, with fleet number from K01 to K25, complemented by L stock, with fleet number from L26 to L47.

K stock had tests in other line, but never operated out of Line 3-Red.

== History ==
C stock was built from 1979 to 1986 by companies Mafersa and Cobrasma, in the factory of the last one, located in Sumaré, São Paulo.

Between 2011 and 2014, this rolling stock was refurbished by MTTrens consortium, composed by MPE Engenharia, Temoinsa and T'Trans, in Três Rios, becoming the K stock.

Currently, all of the trains operate on Line 3-Red, same line of the old C stock.

== Characteristics ==
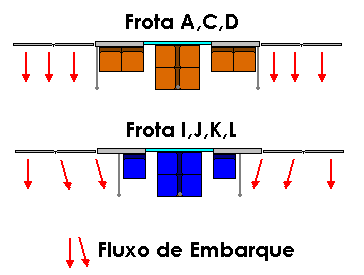
The modernization of the São Paulo Metro trains brought many benefits to the system, such as a larger boarding capacity, coming from the reduction of the seat number.

The modernization of the São Paulo Metro trains brought many benefits, mostly regarding the energy consumption.

The fleet engines were changed, operating in alternating current and microprocessed control, against the old ones in direct current and Chopper system. In addition to facilitating their maintenance, it resulted in energy economy that, even with the addition of air-conditioning systems in the cars and driving cabins, the trains continued to consume the same amount of electricity, compared to the old fleet with conventional ventilation.

Besides that, the visual communication of the trains was updated, with the change of masks and painting, equipment added to better inform the passengers, such as electronic strip maps, LED panels and light bulbs over the doors alerting people with hearing loss about the closing doors, installation of new safety and supervision systems and updates to the signalling system.

== Controversies ==
In the beginning of its service, many reports were made claiming the existence of problems in the rolling stock, although they were denied by the metro company.

It is important to emphasize, however, that failures are common in recent delivered trains, which was the case with this stock during the moment it had more problems. Besides that, this fleet was the first that had its modernization concluded faster, being the first one to meet the deadline.

Finally, it was found that, during modernization, the stock bogies were not updated; later, the metro company replaced the old parts of all cars. Even so, the fleet is the second with the highest number of failures, with its MKBF index only being higher than the E stock, built in 1999.

== See also ==
- Line 3 (São Paulo Metro)
- São Paulo Metro
