= Palmeiras–Barra Funda (São Paulo Metro) =

São Paulo Metro station

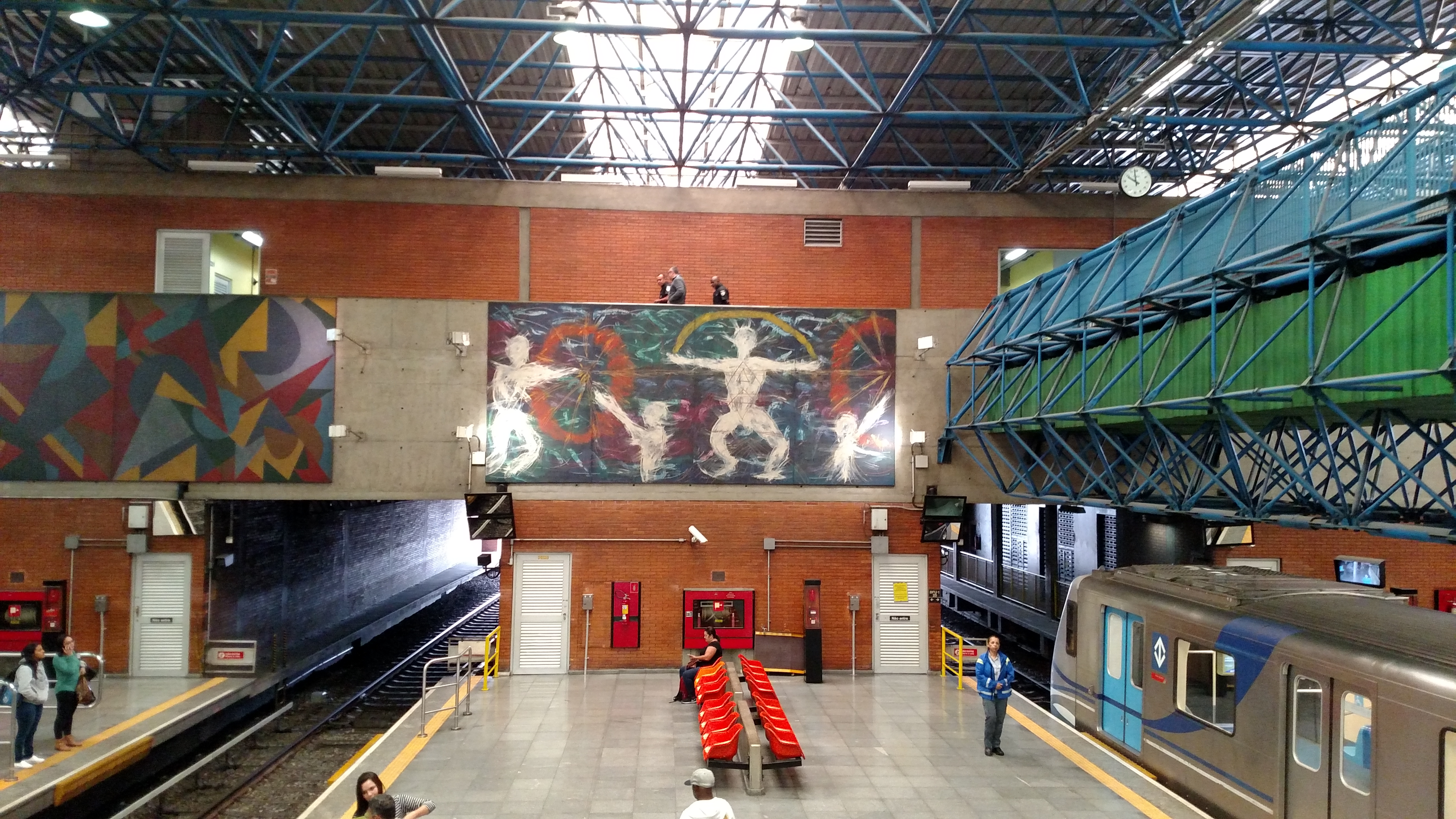
- Terminal Palmeiras–Barra Funda, São Paulo, Brazil.

General information
- Location: São Paulo; Brazil
- Coordinates: 23°31′32″S 46°40′02″W
- Owner: Government of the State of São Paulo
- Operator: Companhia do Metropolitano de São Paulo
- Platforms: 2 side platforms 1 island platform
- Connections: Barra Funda Bus Terminal; Barra Funda Road Terminal

Construction
- Structure type: At-grade
- Accessible: Y

Other information
- Station code: BFU

History
- Opened: 18 December 1988
- Former names: Barra Funda

Passengers
- 131,000/business day

Services
Preceding station	São Paulo Metro	Following station
Terminus	Line 3	Marechal Deodoro towards Corinthians-Itaquera
Out-of-system interchange
Preceding station	São Paulo Metropolitan Trains	Following station
Água Branca towards Jundiaí	Line 7	Luz towards Palmeiras-Barra Funda
Lapa towards Amador Bueno	Line 8	Júlio Prestes Terminus
Terminus	Line 10	Luz towards Rio Grande da Serra
Terminus	Line 11	Luz towards Estudantes
Terminus	Line 13-Airport Express	Luz towards Aeroporto–Guarulhos
Transfer at: Palmeiras-Barra Funda (CPTM)
Track layout
Location

Palmeiras–Barra Funda or just Barra Funda is a station on Line 3-Red of the São Paulo Metro, TIC Trens Line 7-Ruby and ViaMobilidade Linhas 8 e 9 Line 8-Diamond and CPTM Line 10-Turquoise and Line 11-Coral of the commuter train. The metro station is inside the Palmeiras–Barra Funda Intermodal Terminal, a major transit station in São Paulo. The complex contains municipal, intercity, and metropolitan bus lines; metro; and commuter rail terminals. Since 2006, the station was known as Palmeiras–Barra Funda, named after football club Sociedade Esportiva Palmeiras.

== Station layout ==
M	Concourse	Fare control, ticket office, customer service, Bilhete Único/TOP recharge machines, concourse, transfer to
P Platform level
P Platform level	Side platform, doors open on the right
P Platform level	Eastbound	toward Corinthians-Itaquera →
P Platform level	Island platform, doors open on the left
P Platform level	Eastbound	toward Corinthians-Itaquera →
P Platform level	Side platform, doors open on the right
