= Corinthians-Itaquera (São Paulo Metro) =

São Paulo Metro station

Corinthians–Itaquera
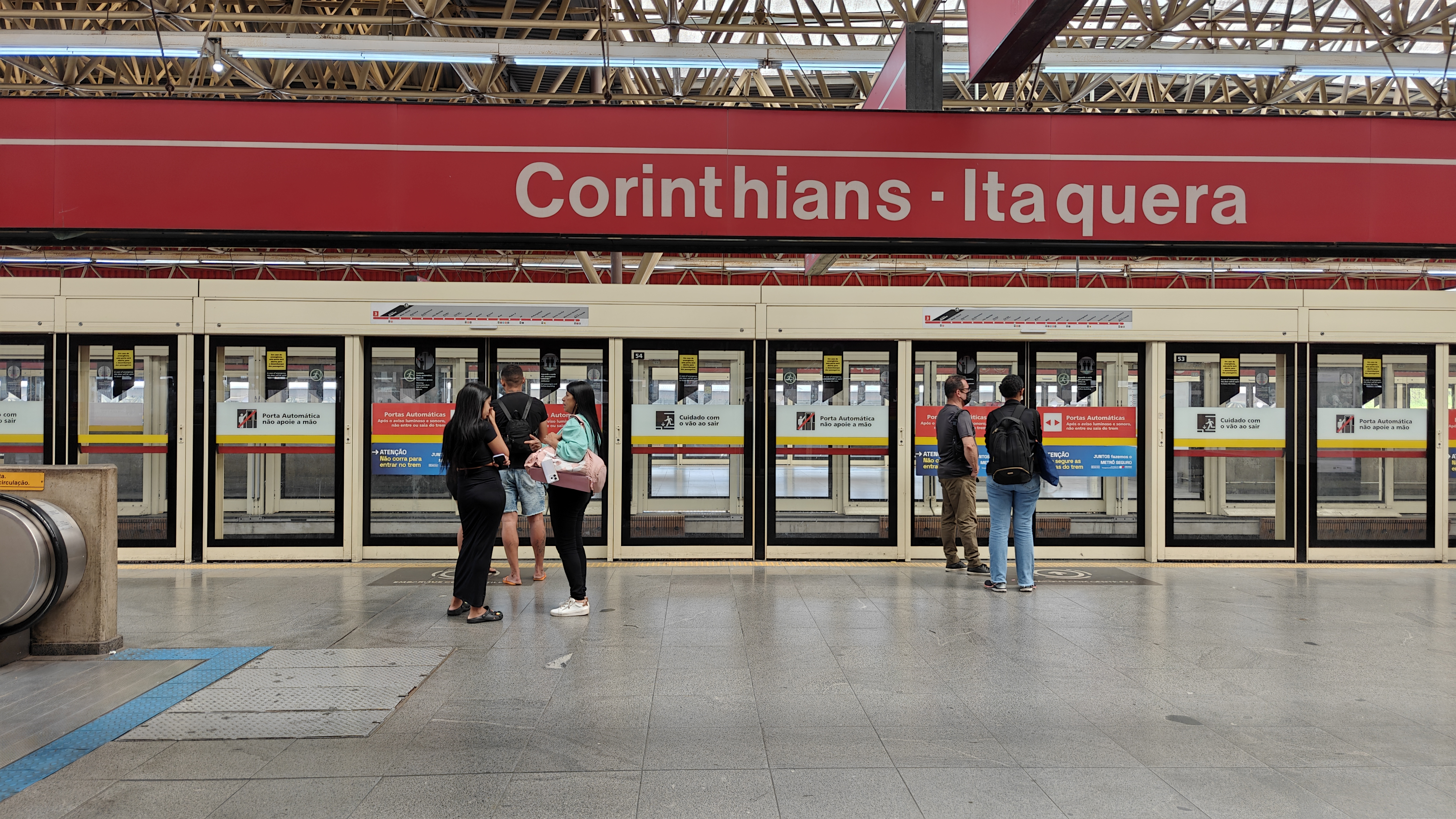
- Platform of the metro station

General information
- Location: Av. Projetada, 1900, Itaquera; São Paulo; Brazil
- Coordinates: 23.5423747°S 46.4710683°W
- Owner: Government of the State of São Paulo
- Operator: Companhia do Metropolitano de São Paulo; CPTM
- Platforms: Island platforms Side platforms
- Connections: Itaquera Bus Terminal

Construction
- Structure type: Elevated

Other information
- Station code: ITQ

History
- Opened: 1 October 1988; 27 May 2000
- Former names: Corinthians Paulista; Itaquera

Passengers
- 73,000/business day

Services
Preceding station	São Paulo Metro	Following station
Artur Alvim towards Palmeiras–Barra Funda	Line 3	Terminus
Preceding station	São Paulo Metropolitan Trains	Following station
Tatuapé towards Palmeiras-Barra Funda	Line 11	Dom Bosco towards Estudantes
Future services
Cidade A. E. Carvalho towards Bonsucesso	Line 14	Hospital Santa Marcelina towards Jardim Irene
Track layout
Line track layout
Line track layout
Location

Corinthians-Itaquera, or just Itaquera, is a station which is part of the metropolitan train system of CPTM and São Paulo Metro.

Corinthians-Itaquera station has this name for being located in the district of Itaquera, in São Paulo, close to Arena Corinthians. There is, also, connection with Poupatempo in Itaquera and Shopping Metrô Itaquera in its surroundings. It's located in Avenida Projetada, 1900.

== Metro Line 3-Red ==
Corinthians-Itaquera station was opened on 1 October 1988, being terminus for São Paulo Metro Line 3-Red, in the East route. In this station, there is also a connection with the Line 3-Red Maintenance Yard, known as "Itaquera yard" or "PIT".

The station is elevated with two island platforms over the distribution level, structure in apparent concrete, and metallic spatial lattice cover. It has adapted access for people with disabilities and reduced movements. Occupies an area of 30,435 square metres (327,600 sq ft) and has capacity for 60,000 passengers per day during peak hours.

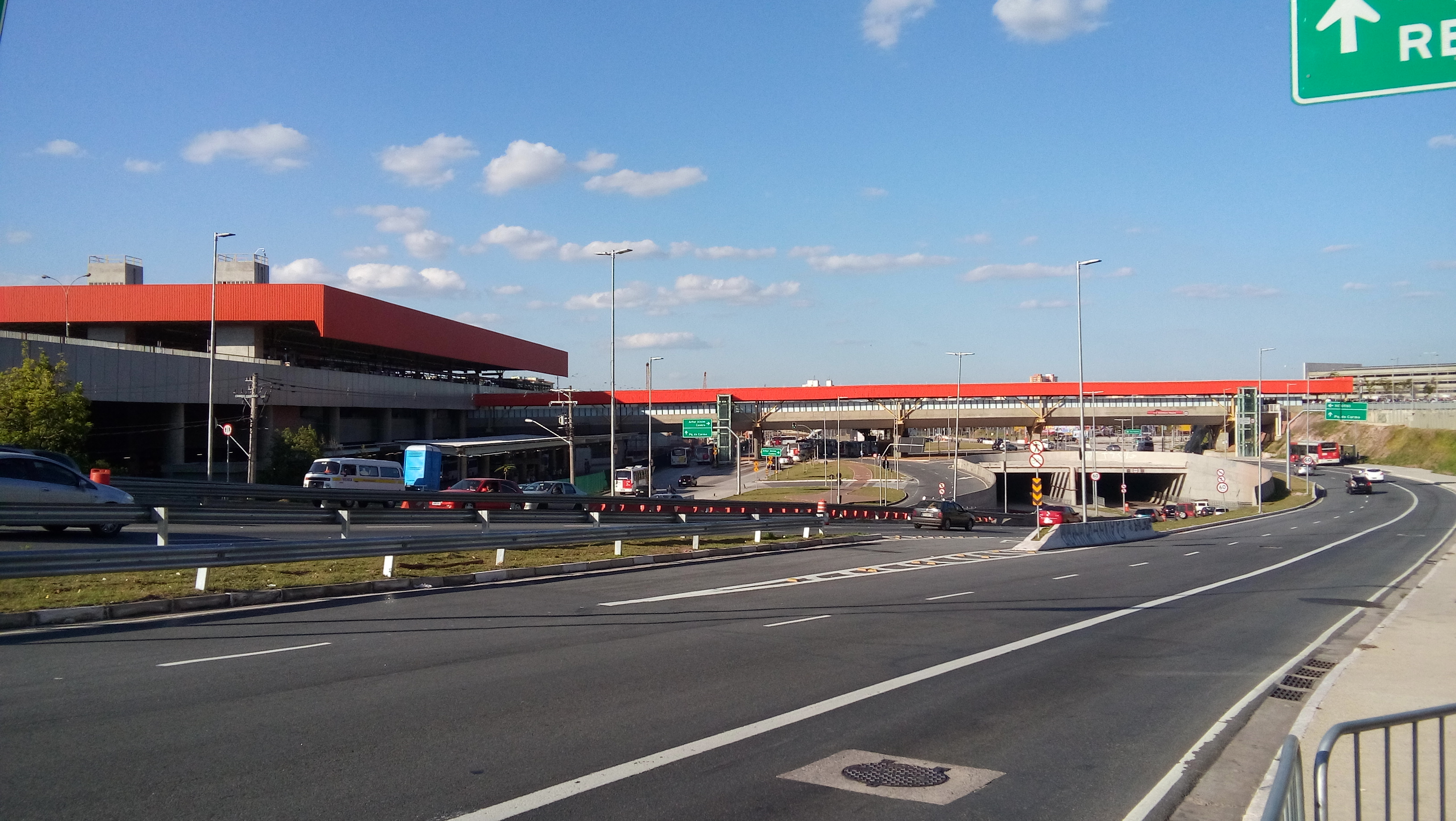
View of Metro station and access catwalk to Arena Corinthians.

== CPTM Line 11-Coral ==
Corinthians-Itaquera station is a train station on CPTM Line 11-Coral.

The current CPTM station area, which corresponds to one island platform, was built by São Paulo Metro, being unused for almost 12 years, and opened on 27 May 2000 to be used by the then-East Express.
