= List of São Paulo Metro stations =

This is a list of São Paulo Metro stations. Only urban bus terminals were quoted in this page. (Some stations have nearby bus lines, but they are technically not in the terminal. Tucuruvi (line 1) and Guilhermina-Esperança (line 3) stations, for example.)

== Line 1 (Blue) ==
Code	Station	Platforms	Position	Connections	District
TUC	Tucuruvi	Side platforms	Partially underground	Tucuruvi Bus Terminal; Guarulhos–São Paulo Metropolitan Corridor	Tucuruvi
PIG	Parada Inglesa	Side platforms	Elevated	Parada Inglesa Bus Terminal	Tucuruvi
JPA	Jardim São Paulo–Ayrton Senna	Island platform	Underground	-	Santana
SAN	Santana	Side platforms	Elevated	Santana Bus Terminal	Santana
CDU	Carandiru	Side platforms	Elevated	-	Santana
TTE	Portuguesa-Tietê	Side platforms	Elevated	Tietê Road Terminal	Santana
PPQ	Armênia	Side platforms	Elevated	Armênia Bus Terminal	Bom Retiro
TRD	Tiradentes	Island platform	Underground	-	Bom Retiro
LUZ	Luz	Island and side platforms	Underground	Touristic Express	Bom Retiro
BTO	São Bento	Split platforms	Underground	19 (Planned)	Sé
PSE	Sé	Island and side platforms	Underground	Line 3 (São Paulo Metro)	Sé
LIB	Japão-Liberdade	Side platforms	Underground	-	Sé
JQM	São Joaquim	Side platforms	Underground	(Future)	Liberdade
VGO	Vergueiro	Side platforms	Underground	-	Liberdade
PSO	Paraíso	Split platforms	Underground	Line 2 (São Paulo Metro)	Vila Mariana
ANR	Ana Rosa	Island platform	Underground	16 (Planned); Ana Rosa Bus Terminal	Vila Mariana
VMN	Vila Mariana	Side platforms	Underground	Vila Mariana Bus Terminal	Vila Mariana
SCZ	Santa Cruz	Side platforms	Underground	José Diniz–Ibirapuera–Santa Cruz Bus Corridor	Vila Mariana
ARV	Praça da Árvore	Side platforms	Underground	-	Saúde
SAU	Saúde	Side platforms	Underground	20 (Planned)	Saúde
JUD	São Judas	Side platforms	Underground	-	Saúde
CON	Conceição	Side platforms	Underground	Conceição Bus Terminal	Jabaquara
JAB	Jabaquara-Comitê Paralímpico Brasileiro	Side platforms	Underground	(Planned); Jabaquara Metropolitan Terminal; São Mateus–Jabaquara Metropolitan Corridor; São Paulo Zoo shuttle bus service Jabaquara Road Terminal	Jabaquara

Obs.: Line 11 (East Express) is being converted into metro standard, but it won't be line 6-Orange.
Line 8 doesn't pass through Luz station. Its terminus is at Júlio Prestes Station, two blocks away from Luz station.

== Line 2 (Green) ==
Code	Station	Platforms	Position	Connections	District
COA	Cerro Corá	Side platforms	Underground	20 (Planned)	Between Pinheiros and Lapa
VMD	Vila Madalena	Side platforms	Underground	Vila Madalena Bus Terminal	Between Pinheiros and Perdizes
SUM	Santuário Nossa Senhora de Fátima-Sumaré	Side platforms	Elevated	-	Between Perdizes and Jardim Paulista
CLI	Clínicas	Side platforms	Underground	-	Between Consolação and Jardim Paulista
CNS	Consolação	Island platforms	Underground	Campo Limpo–Rebouças–Centro Bus Corridor	Between Consolação and Jardim Paulista
TRI	Trianon-Masp	Island platforms	Underground	-	Between Bela Vista and Jardim Paulista
BGD	Brigadeiro	Island platforms	Underground	-	Between Bela Vista and Vila Mariana
PSO	Paraíso	Side platforms	Underground	Line 1 (São Paulo Metro)	Vila Mariana
ANR	Ana Rosa	Island platforms	Underground	16 (Planned); Ana Rosa Bus Terminal	Vila Mariana
CKB	Chácara Klabin	Island platforms	Underground	Line 5 (São Paulo Metro)	Vila Mariana
IMG	Santos-Imigrantes	Island platforms	Elevated	-	Cursino
AIP	Alto do Ipiranga	Side platforms	Underground	-	Ipiranga
SAC	Sacomã	Side platforms	Underground	Sacomã Bus Terminal; Expresso Tiradentes; BRT ABC (Future)	Ipiranga
TTI	Tamanduateí	Side platforms	Elevated	BRT ABC (Future)	Between Ipiranga and Vila Prudente
VPT	Vila Prudente	Side platforms	Underground	Vila Prudente Bus Terminal; Expresso Tiradentes	Vila Prudente
OFT	Orfanato	Side platforms	Underground	-	Vila Prudente
TBA	Santa Clara	Side platforms	Underground	Santa Clara Bus Terminal (Future)	Água Rasa
ANF	Anália Franco	Side platforms	Underground	16 (Planned)	Água Rasa
VFO	Vila Formosa	Side platforms	Underground	Vila Formosa Bus Terminal (Future)	Vila Formosa
TBA	Santa Isabel	Side platforms	Underground	-	Carrão
GUI	Guilherme Giorgi	Side platforms	Underground	-	Carrão
ARI	Aricanduva	Side platforms	Underground	-	Vila Matilde
PEN	Penha	Side platforms	Underground	(Future); Penha Bus Terminal	Penha
PEF	Penha de França	Side platforms	Underground	-	Penha
TIC	Gabriela Mistral	Side platforms	Underground	Tiquatira Bus Terminal (Planned); Guarulhos–São Paulo Metropolitan Corridor (Planned) (Planned)	Cangaíba
TBA	Fernão Dias	Side platforms	Underground	-	Cangaíba
PGD	Ponte Grande	Side platforms	Underground	-	Ponte Grande (Guarulhos)
DUT	Dutra	Side platforms	Underground	19 (Planned); Dutra Bus Terminal (Planned)	Vila Augusta (Guarulhos)

Obs.: The subprefecture of Bela Vista doesn't exist. Bela Vista's district belongs to subprefecture of Sé. Paulista Avenue is used as a line of division of subprefectures. Consequently, this line is between those subprefectures

== Line 3 (Red) ==
Code	Station	Platforms	Position	Connections	District
BFU	Palmeiras–Barra Funda	Island and side platforms	At-grade	Barra Funda Bus Terminal; Barra Funda Road Terminal	Barra Funda
DEO	Marechal Deodoro	Split platforms	Underground	-	Santa Cecília
CEC	Santa Cecília	Side platforms	Underground	Amaral Gurgel Bus Terminal	Santa Cecília
REP	República	Island and side platforms	Underground	Line 4 (São Paulo Metro)	República
GBU	Anhangabaú	Island platform	Underground	19 (Planned); Bandeira Bus Terminal; Campo Limpo–Rebouças–Centro Bus Corridor; Pirituba–Lapa–Centro Bus Corridor; Santo Amaro–9 de Julho–Centro Bus Corridor	República and Sé
PSE	Sé	Island and side platforms	Underground	Line 1 (São Paulo Metro)	Sé
PDS	Pedro II	Side platforms	Elevated	Expresso Tiradentes	Sé
BAS	Brás	Island and side platforms	Elevated	Brás Bus Terminal	Brás
BRE	Bresser–Mooca	Island platform	At-grade	-	Brás
BEL	Belém	Island platform	At-grade	North Belém Bus Terminal; South Belém Bus Terminal	Belém
TAT	Tatuapé	Island and side platforms	At-grade	North Tatuapé Bus Terminal; South Tatuapé Bus Terminal	Tatuapé
CAR	Carrão	Island platform	At-grade	North Carrão Bus Terminal; South Carrão Bus Terminal	Tatuapé
PEN	Penha	Island platform	At-grade	(Future) (Future); Penha Bus Terminal	Penha
VTD	Vila Matilde	Island platform	At-grade	Vila Matilde Bus Terminal	Vila Matilde
VPA	Guilhermina–Esperança	Island platform	At-grade	-	Vila Matilde
PCA	Patriarca–Vila Ré	Island platform	Partially elevated	Patriarca Bus Terminal	Vila Matilde and Penha
ART	Artur Alvim	Island platform	At-grade	North Artur Alvim Bus Terminal; South Artur Alvim Bus Terminal	Artur Alvim
ITQ	Corinthians–Itaquera	Island and side platforms	Elevated	(Planned); Itaquera Bus Terminal	Itaquera

Obs.: Line 11 (East Express) is being converted into metro standard, but it won't be line 6-Orange.
Nowadays, Luz station is the terminus of line 11. There are projects to extend it to Barra Funda station. Bresser's bus terminal is no longer in activity.

== Line 4 (Yellow) ==
Code	Station	Platforms	Position	Connections	District
LUZ	Luz	Side platforms	Underground	Touristic Express	Bom Retiro
REP	República	Side platforms	Underground	Line 3 (São Paulo Metro)	República
HIG	Higienópolis–Mackenzie	Side platforms	Underground	(Future)	Consolação
PTA	Paulista	Side platforms	Underground	Campo Limpo–Rebouças–Centro Bus Corridor	Consolação
FRE	Oscar Freire	Side platforms	Underground	16 (Planned); Campo Limpo–Rebouças–Centro Bus Corridor	Jardim Paulista
FRA	Fradique Coutinho	Side platforms	Underground	20 (Planned)	Pinheiros
FAL	Faria Lima	Side platforms	Underground	-	Pinheiros
PIN	Pinheiros	Side platforms	Underground	Pinheiros Bus Terminal	Pinheiros
BUT	Butantã	Side platforms	Underground	Butantã Bus Terminal; Itapevi–Butantã Metropolitan Corridor	Butantã
MBI	São Paulo–Morumbi	Side platforms	Underground	(Planned); Morumbi Bus Terminal; Campo Limpo–Rebouças–Centro Bus Corridor	Morumbi
VSO	Vila Sônia–Professora Elisabeth Tenreiro	Side platforms	Underground	Vila Sônia Bus Terminal; Campo Limpo–Rebouças–Centro Bus Corridor; Vila Sônia–Taboão da Serra free shuttle bus	Vila Sônia
TBA	Chácara do Jockey	Side platforms	Underground	Campo Limpo–Rebouças–Centro Bus Corridor	Vila Sônia
TBA	Taboão da Serra	Side platforms	Underground	Taboão da Serra Bus Terminal (Planned)	Parque Santos Dumont (Taboão da Serra)

Obs.: Line 11 (East Express) is being converted into metro standard, but it won't be line 6-Orange.
Line 8 doesn't pass through Luz station. Its terminus is at Júlio Prestes station, two blocks far from Luz station.

== Line 5 (Lilac) ==
Code	Station	Platforms	Position	Connections	District
TBA	Jardim Ângela	TBA	Underground	Jardim Ângela Bus Terminal	Capão Redondo
TBA	Comendador Sant'Anna	TBA	Elevated	-	Capão Redondo
CPR	Capão Redondo	Side platforms	Elevated	Capão Redondo Bus Terminal	Capão Redondo
CPL	Campo Limpo	Side platforms	Elevated	Campo Limpo Bus Terminal	Campo Limpo
VBE	Vila das Belezas	Side platforms	Elevated	-	Vila Andrade
GGR	Giovanni Gronchi	Side platforms	Elevated	João Dias Bus Terminal; Itapecerica–João Dias–Santo Amaro Bus Corridor	Vila Andrade
STA	Santo Amaro	Side platforms	Elevated	Guido Caloi Bus Terminal	Santo Amaro
LTR	Largo Treze	Side platforms	Underground	Santo Amaro Bus Terminal; Santo Amaro–9 de Julho–Centro Bus Corridor	Santo Amaro
APN	Adolfo Pinheiro	Side platforms	Underground	Santo Amaro–9 de Julho–Centro Bus Corridor	Santo Amaro
ABV	Alto da Boa Vista	Island platform	Underground	-	Santo Amaro
BGA	Borba Gato	Island platform	Underground	Santo Amaro–9 de Julho–Centro Bus Corridor	Santo Amaro
BRK	Brooklin	Island platform	Underground	Santo Amaro–9 de Julho–Centro Bus Corridor; Diadema–Morumbi Metropolitan Corridor	Campo Belo
CPB	Campo Belo	Island platform	Underground	Line 17 (São Paulo Metro)	Campo Belo
ECT	Eucaliptos	Side platforms	Underground	José Diniz–Ibirapuera–Santa Cruz Bus Corridor	Moema
MOE	Moema	Side platforms	Underground	20 (Planned); José Diniz–Ibirapuera–Santa Cruz Bus Corridor	Moema
SER	AACD–Servidor	Side platforms	Underground	-	Moema
HSP	Hospital São Paulo	Side platforms	Underground	José Diniz–Ibirapuera–Santa Cruz Bus Corridor	Vila Mariana
SCZ	Santa Cruz	Side platforms	Underground	José Diniz–Ibirapuera–Santa Cruz Bus Corridor	Vila Mariana
CKL	Chácara Klabin	Side platforms	Underground	Line 2 (São Paulo Metro)	Vila Mariana

== Line 6 (Orange) ==
Code	Station	Platforms	Position	Connections	District
BRA	Brasilândia	Side platforms	Underground	Brasilândia Bus Terminal (Future)	Brasilândia
VCS	Maristela	Side platforms	Underground	Maristela Bus Terminal (Future)	Freguesia do Ó
ITA	Itaberaba–Hospital Vila Penteado	Side platforms	Underground	-	Freguesia do Ó
JPP	João Paulo I	Side platforms	Underground	João Paulo I Bus Terminal (Future)	Freguesia do Ó
FGO	Freguesia do Ó	Side platforms	Underground	-	Freguesia do Ó
SMA	Santa Marina	Side platforms	Underground	20 (Planned)	Barra Funda
ABR	Água Branca	Side platforms	Underground	(Planned)	Lapa
SPA	SESC–Pompeia	Side platforms	Underground	-	Perdizes
PZE	Perdizes	Side platforms	Underground	-	Perdizes
PUC	PUC–Cardoso de Almeida	Side platforms	Underground	-	Perdizes
TBA	FAAP–Pacaembu	Side platforms	Underground	-	Consolação
MKZ	Higienópolis–Mackenzie	Side platforms	Underground	Line 4 (São Paulo Metro)	Consolação
BIX	14 Bis–Saracura	Side platforms	Underground	Santo Amaro–9 de Julho–Centro Bus Corridor	Bela Vista
TZM	Bela Vista	Side platforms	Underground	-	Bela Vista
JQM	São Joaquim	Side platforms	Underground	Line 1 (São Paulo Metro)	Liberdade

== Line 15 (Silver) ==
Code	Station	Platforms	Position	Connections	District
TBA	Ipiranga	Side platforms	Elevated	Companhia Paulista de Trens Metropolitanos Line 10 (CPTM)	Ipiranga
VPM	Vila Prudente	Island platforms	Elevated	Vila Prudente Bus Terminal; Expresso Tiradentes	Vila Prudente
ORT	Oratório	Island platforms	Elevated	-	São Lucas
SLU	São Lucas	Island platforms	Elevated	-	São Lucas
CAD	Camilo Haddad	Island platforms	Elevated	-	São Lucas
VTL	Vila Tolstói	Island platforms	Elevated	-	São Lucas/Sapopemba
VUN	Vila União	Island platforms	Elevated	-	Sapopemba
JPL	Jardim Planalto	Island platforms	Elevated	-	Sapopemba
SAP	Sapopemba	Island platforms	Elevated	(Planned); Sapopemba/Teotônio Vilela Bus Terminal	Sapopemba
FJT	Fazenda da Juta	Island platforms	Elevated	-	Sapopemba
MAT	São Mateus	Island platforms	Elevated	São Mateus Metropolitan Terminal; São Mateus–Jabaquara Metropolitan Corridor; Metropolitan BRT East Perimetral (Planned)	São Mateus
IGT	Jardim Colonial	Island platforms	Elevated	-	São Mateus
JEQ	Boa Esperança	Island platforms	Elevated	-	Iguatemi
JPS	Jacu-Pêssego	Island platforms	Elevated	-	Iguatemi
ESM	Jardim Marilu	Island platforms	Elevated	-	Iguatemi
MBK	Jardim Pedra Branca	Island platforms	Elevated	-	Cidade Tiradentes
CDT	Cidade Tiradentes	Island platforms	Elevated	16 (Planned); Cidade Tiradentes Bus Terminal	Cidade Tiradentes
HCT	Hospital Cidade Tiradentes	Island platforms	Elevated	-	Cidade Tiradentes

== Line 17 (Gold) ==
Code	Station	Platforms	Position	Connections	District
MBM	São Paulo–Morumbi	Island platforms	Elevated	Morumbi Bus Terminal; Campo Limpo–Rebouças–Centro Bus Corridor	Morumbi
EMB	Estádio Morumbi	Island platforms	Elevated	-	Morumbi
AMR	Américo Maurano	Island platforms	Elevated	-	Morumbi
PSP	Paraisópolis	Island platforms	Elevated	-	Vila Andrade
PNB	Panamby	Island platforms	Elevated	-	Vila Andrade
MOB	Morumbi	Side platforms	Elevated	Diadema–Morumbi Metropolitan Corridor	Santo Amaro
CZD	Chucri Zaidan	Island platforms	Elevated	Água Espraiada Bus Transfer Station; Berrini Bus Corridor	Itaim Bibi
VCD	Vila Cordeiro	Island platforms	Elevated	-	Itaim Bibi
CPB	Campo Belo	Island platforms	Elevated	Line 5 (São Paulo Metro)	Campo Belo
VJD	Vereador José Diniz	Island platforms	Elevated	-	Campo Belo
BPA	Brooklin Paulista	Island platforms	Elevated	-	Campo Belo
CGN	Aeroporto de Congonhas	Island platforms	Elevated	São Paulo–Congonhas Airport	Campo Belo
JAP	Washington Luís	Island platforms	Elevated	-	Campo Belo
VPI	Vila Paulista	Island platforms	Elevated	-	Jabaquara
BAB	Vila Babilônia	Island platforms	Elevated	-	Jabaquara
CLE	Cidade Leonor	Island platforms	Elevated	-	Jabaquara
HSB	Hospital Sabóia	Island platforms	Elevated	-	Jabaquara
JBM	Jabaquara–Comitê Paralímpico Brasileiro	Island platforms	Elevated	Jabaquara Metropolitan Terminal; São Mateus–Jabaquara Metropolitan Corridor; São Paulo Zoo shuttle bus service Jabaquara Road Terminal	Jabaquara
