= Tamanduateí (São Paulo Metro) =

São Paulo Metro station

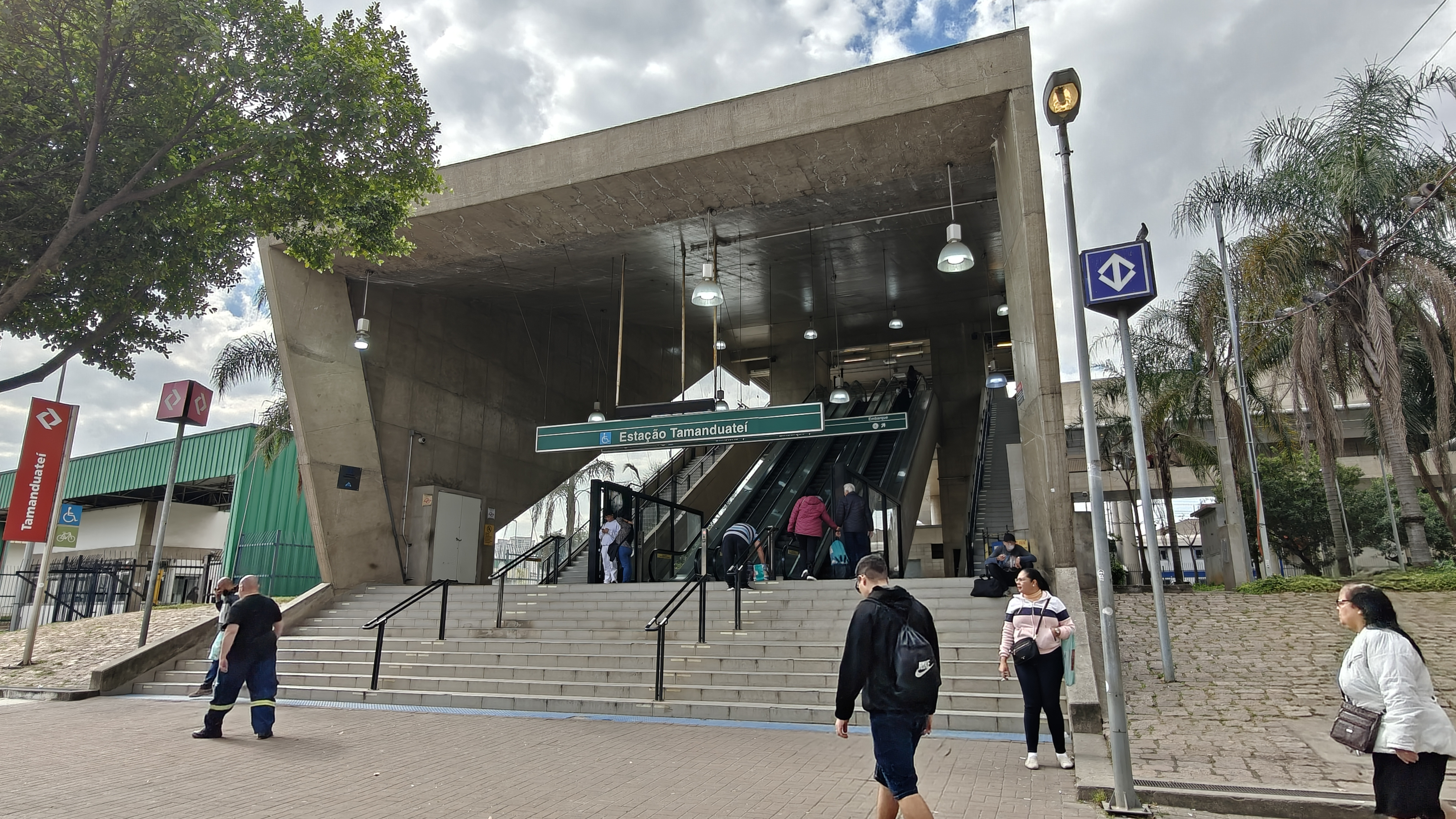
- Tamanduateí station

General information
- Location: Rua Guamiranga, 750, Ipiranga; São Paulo; Brazil
- Coordinates: 23°35′40″S 46°35′17″W
- Owner: Government of the State of São Paulo
- Operator: Companhia do Metropolitano de São Paulo
- Platforms: Side platforms
- Connections: BRT ABC (future)

Construction
- Structure type: Elevated
- Accessible: Yes

Other information
- Station code: TTI

History
- Opened: September 21, 2010; 15 years ago

Passengers
- 64,000/business day

Services
Preceding station	São Paulo Metro	Following station
Sacomã towards Vila Madalena	Line 2	Vila Prudente towards Penha
Out-of-system interchange
Preceding station	São Paulo Metropolitan Trains	Following station
Ipiranga towards Palmeiras-Barra Funda	Line 10 transfer at Tamanduateí	São Caetano do Sul-Pref. Walter Braido towards Rio Grande da Serra
Terminus	Express Line 10 transfer at Tamanduateí	São Caetano do Sul-Pref. Walter Braido towards Pref. Celso Daniel-Santo André
Brás towards Luz	Express Line 10+ transfer at Tamanduateí	São Caetano do Sul-Pref. Walter Braido towards Pref. Celso Daniel-Santo André
Track layout
Location

Tamanduateí is a station on Line 2 (Green) of the São Paulo Metro and Line 10 (Turquoise) of the CPTM commuter train.

== Station layout ==
P Platform level
P Platform level	Side platform, doors open on the right
P Platform level	Northbound	← toward Vila Madalena
P Platform level	Southbound	toward Vila Prudente →
P Platform level	Side platform, doors open on the right
M	Mezzanine	Fare control, ticket office, customer service, Bilhete Único/BOM recharge machines, transfer between Lines and
G	Street level	Exit/entrance

== SPTrans lines ==
The following SPTrans bus lines can be accessed. Passengers may use a Bilhete Único card for transfer:

Line #	Destination
3134/10	Shopping Aricanduva
375V/10	Metrô Alto Ipiranga
4031/10	Parque Santa Madalena
5025/10	Jardim Guairacá
5110/41	São Mateus

== EMTU lines ==
The following EMTU bus lines can be accessed:

Line	Destination
018	SANTO ANDRÉ (Príncipe de Gales)
047	SANTO ANDRÉ (Vila Palmares)
562	SÃO CAETANO DO SUL (Jardim São Caetano)
