= Ana Rosa (São Paulo Metro) =

São Paulo Metro station

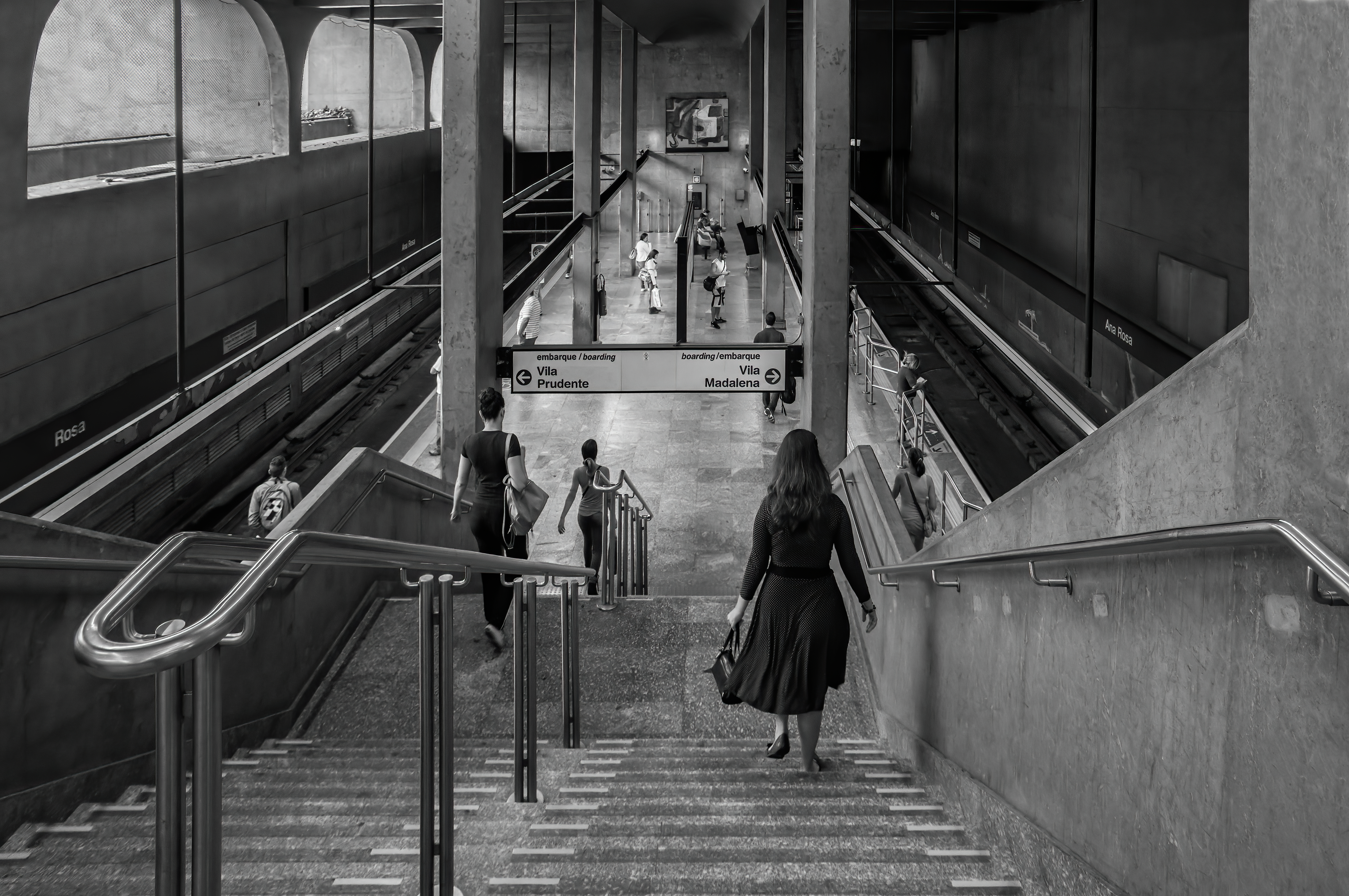

General information
- Location: Rua Vergueiro, 505, Vila Mariana; São Paulo; Brazil
- Coordinates: 23°34′53″S 46°38′18″W
- Owner: Government of the State of São Paulo
- Operator: Companhia do Metropolitano de São Paulo
- Platforms: Island platforms
- Connections: Ana Rosa Bus Terminal

Construction
- Structure type: Underground
- Accessible: y
- Architect: Silvio Barros Sawaya; Roberto McFadden

Other information
- Station code: ANR

History
- Opened: February 17, 1975; 51 years ago September 12, 1992; 33 years ago

Passengers
- 77,000/business day 61,000/business day

Services
Preceding station	São Paulo Metro	Following station
Paraíso towards Tucuruvi	Line 1	Vila Mariana towards Jabaquara
Paraíso towards Vila Madalena	Line 2	Chácara Klabin towards Penha
Future services
Dante Pazzanese towards Oscar Freire	Line 16 (proposed)	Parque Aclimação towards Cidade Tiradentes
Track layout
Line 1
Line 2
Location

Ana Rosa is a station on Line 1 (Blue) and Line 2 (Green) of the São Paulo Metro.

== Station layout ==
G	Street level	Exit/entrance
M	Mezzanine	Fare control, ticket office, customer service, Bilhete Único/BOM recharge machines
P1; Platform Line 1
P1; Platform Line 1	Northbound	← toward Tucuruvi
P1; Platform Line 1	Island platform, doors open on the left
P1; Platform Line 1	Southbound	toward Jabaquara →
P2; Platform Line 2
P2; Platform Line 2	Northbound	← toward Vila Madalena
P2; Platform Line 2	Island platform, doors open on the left
P2; Platform Line 2	Southbound	toward Vila Prudente →

== SPTrans Lines ==
The following SPTrans bus lines can be accessed. Passengers may use a Bilhete Único card for transfer:

Line	Destination
175P/10	Metro Santana
476G/41	Vila Industrial
675N/10	Santo Amaro Terminal
709A/10	Água Espraiada Terminal
695V/10	Capelinha Terminal
7710/10	Guarapiranga Terminal
775P/10	Jardim Guarau
875P/10	Palmeiras-Barra Funda Metro Station
917M/10	Morro Grande
917M/31	Morro Grande
975A/10	Vila Brasilândia
