= Paraíso (São Paulo Metro) =

São Paulo Metro station

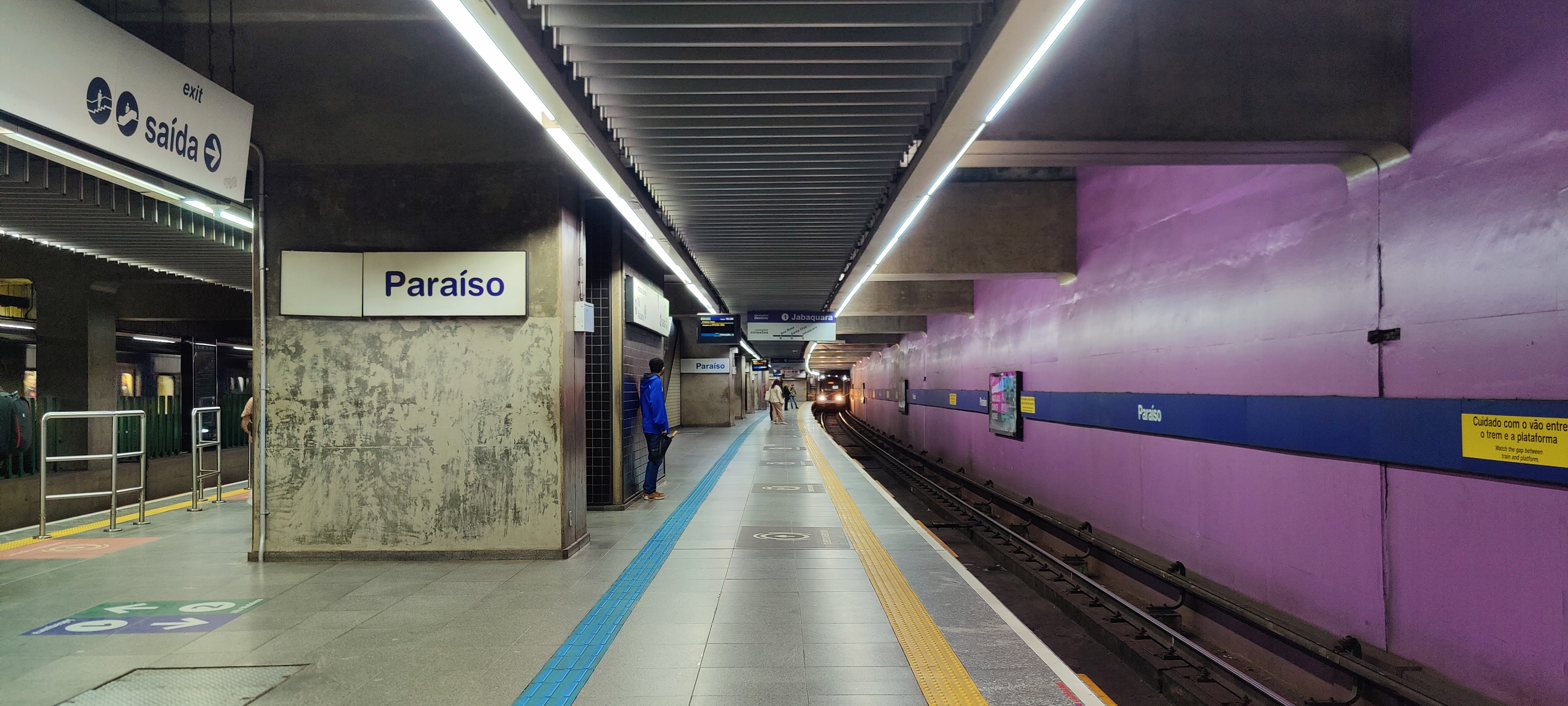
- Platform of Line 1–Blue.

General information
- Location: Rua Vergueiro, 1456, Vila Mariana; São Paulo; Brazil
- Coordinates: 23°34′30″S 46°38′26″W
- Owner: Government of the State of São Paulo
- Operator: Companhia do Metropolitano de São Paulo
- Platforms: Split platforms Side platforms Cross-platform interchange
- Connections: Bus interchange

Construction
- Structure type: Underground
- Accessible: y
- Architect: Marcelo Accioly Fragelli, João Batista Martinez Corrêa, Flávio Pastore

Other information
- Station code: PSO

History
- Opened: February 17, 1975; 51 years ago January 25, 1991; 35 years ago

Passengers
- 96,000/business day 63,000/business day

Services
Preceding station	São Paulo Metro	Following station
Vergueiro towards Tucuruvi	Line 1	Ana Rosa towards Jabaquara
Brigadeiro towards Vila Madalena	Line 2	Ana Rosa towards Penha
Track layout
Upper level
Lower Level
Location

Paraíso is a station on Line 1 (Blue) and Line 2 (Green) of the São Paulo Metro.

== Station layout ==
G	Street level	Exit/entrance
M	Mezzanine	Fare control, ticket office, customer service, Bilhete Único/BOM recharge machines
P1; Platform level 1
P1; Platform level 1	Northbound	← toward Tucuruvi
P1; Platform level 1	Side platform, doors open on the left
P2; Platform level 2
P2; Platform level 2	Southbound	toward Jabaquara →
P2; Platform level 2	Island platform, doors open on the right
P2; Platform level 2	Northbound	← toward Vila Madalena
P2; Platform level 2	Southbound	toward Vila Prudente →
P2; Platform level 2	Side platform, doors open on the right

== SPTrans Lines ==
The following SPTrans bus lines can be accessed. Passengers may use a Bilhete Único card for transfer:

Line	Destination
857P/10	Campo Limpo Terminal
877T/10	Vila Anastácio
