= Santos-Imigrantes (São Paulo Metro) =

São Paulo Metro station

Santos–Imigrantes
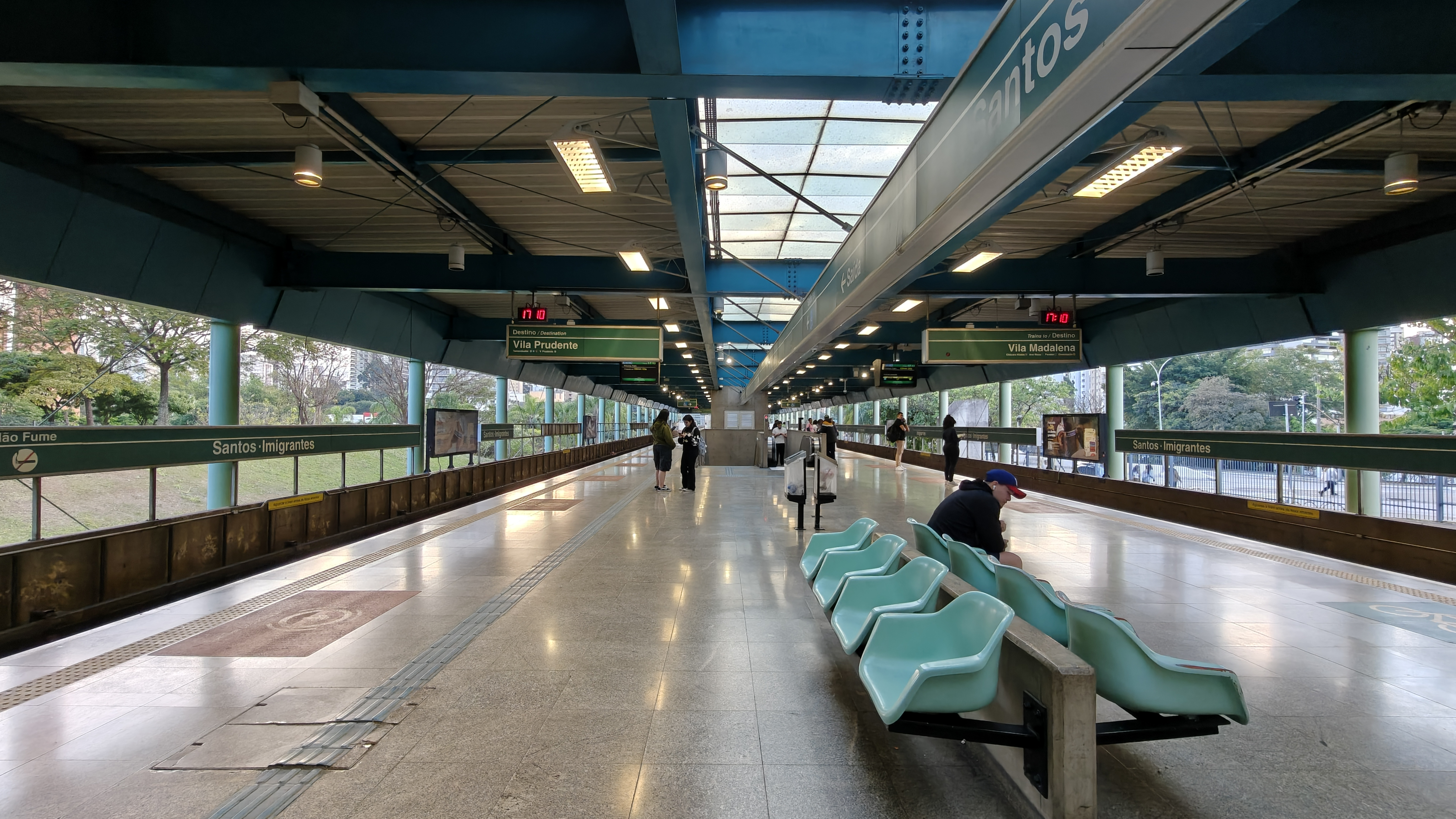

General information
- Location: Av. Dr. Ricardo Jafet, s/n, Cursino; São Paulo; Brazil
- Coordinates: 23°35′45″S 46°37′15″W
- Owner: Government of the State of São Paulo
- Operator: Companhia do Metropolitano de São Paulo
- Platforms: Island platforms
- Connections: Bus interchange

Construction
- Structure type: Elevated
- Accessible: Y
- Architect: Daniel Hopf Fernandes, Ilvio Silva Artioli, Wilson Bracetti

Other information
- Station code: IMG

History
- Opened: March 30, 2006; 20 years ago
- Former names: Imigrantes

Passengers
- 12,000/business day

Services
Preceding station	São Paulo Metro	Following station
Chácara Klabin towards Vila Madalena	Line 2	Alto do Ipiranga towards Penha
Track layout
Location

Santos–Imigrantes is a station on Line 2 (Green) of the São Paulo Metro.

== Station layout ==
P Platform level
P Platform level	Northbound	← toward Vila Madalena
P Platform level	Island platform, doors open on the left
P Platform level	Southbound	toward Vila Prudente →
M	Mezzanine	Fare control, ticket office, customer service, Bilhete Único/BOM recharge machines
G	Street level	Exit/entrance

== SPTrans Lines ==
The following SPTrans bus routes can be accessed. Passengers may use a Bilhete Único card for transfer:

Line	Destination
5703/10	Clube Atlético Ipiranga
9550/10	Chácara Santo Antônio/Berrini
9551/10	Pinheiros/Faria Lima
