= Sacomã (São Paulo Metro) =

São Paulo Metro station

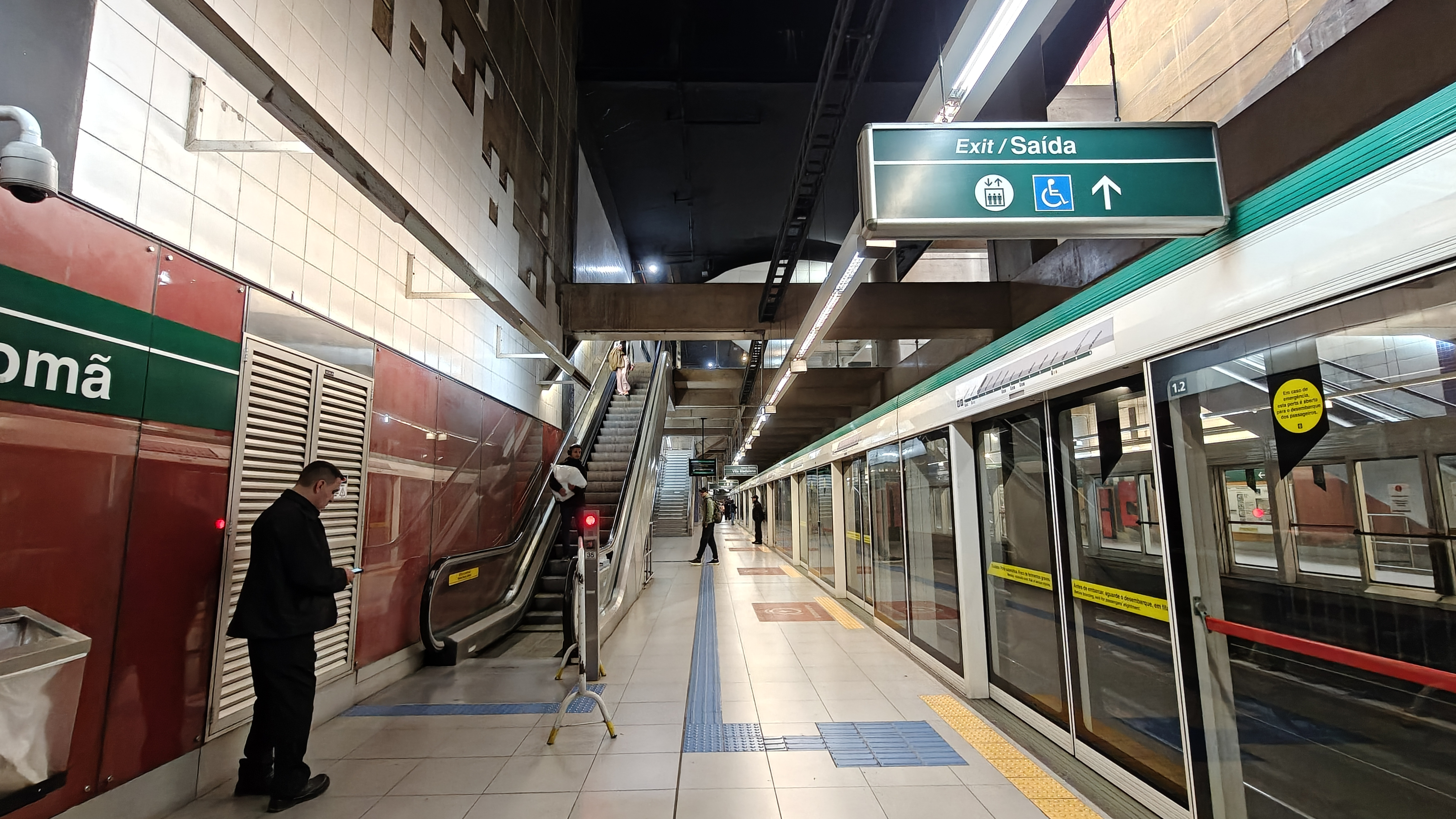
- Sacomã station

General information
- Location: Rua Agostinho Gomes, 3501, Ipiranga; São Paulo; Brazil
- Coordinates: 23°36′05″S 46°36′12″W
- Owner: Government of the State of São Paulo
- Operator: Companhia do Metropolitano de São Paulo
- Platforms: Side platforms
- Connections: Sacomã Bus Terminal; Expresso Tiradentes; BRT ABC (future)

Construction
- Structure type: Underground
- Accessible: y
- Architect: Escritório Tetra Projetos

Other information
- Station code: SAC

History
- Opened: January 10, 2010; 16 years ago

Passengers
- 36,000/business day

Services
Preceding station	São Paulo Metro	Following station
Alto do Ipiranga towards Vila Madalena	Line 2	Tamanduateí towards Penha
Track layout
Location

Sacomã is a station on Line 2 (Green) of the São Paulo Metro. From the station, there is access to Sacomã Terminal, a large bus terminal that includes access to Expresso Tiradentes as well as municipal and intercity bus lines.

== Station layout ==
G	Street level	Exit/entrance
M	Mezzanine	Fare control, ticket office, customer service, Bilhete Único/BOM recharge machines
P Platform level
P Platform level	Side platform, doors open on the right
P Platform level	Northbound	← toward Vila Madalena
P Platform level	Southbound	toward Vila Prudente →
P Platform level	Side platform, doors open on the right
