= Line 2 (São Paulo Metro) =

São Paulo Metro Line 2 (Green)

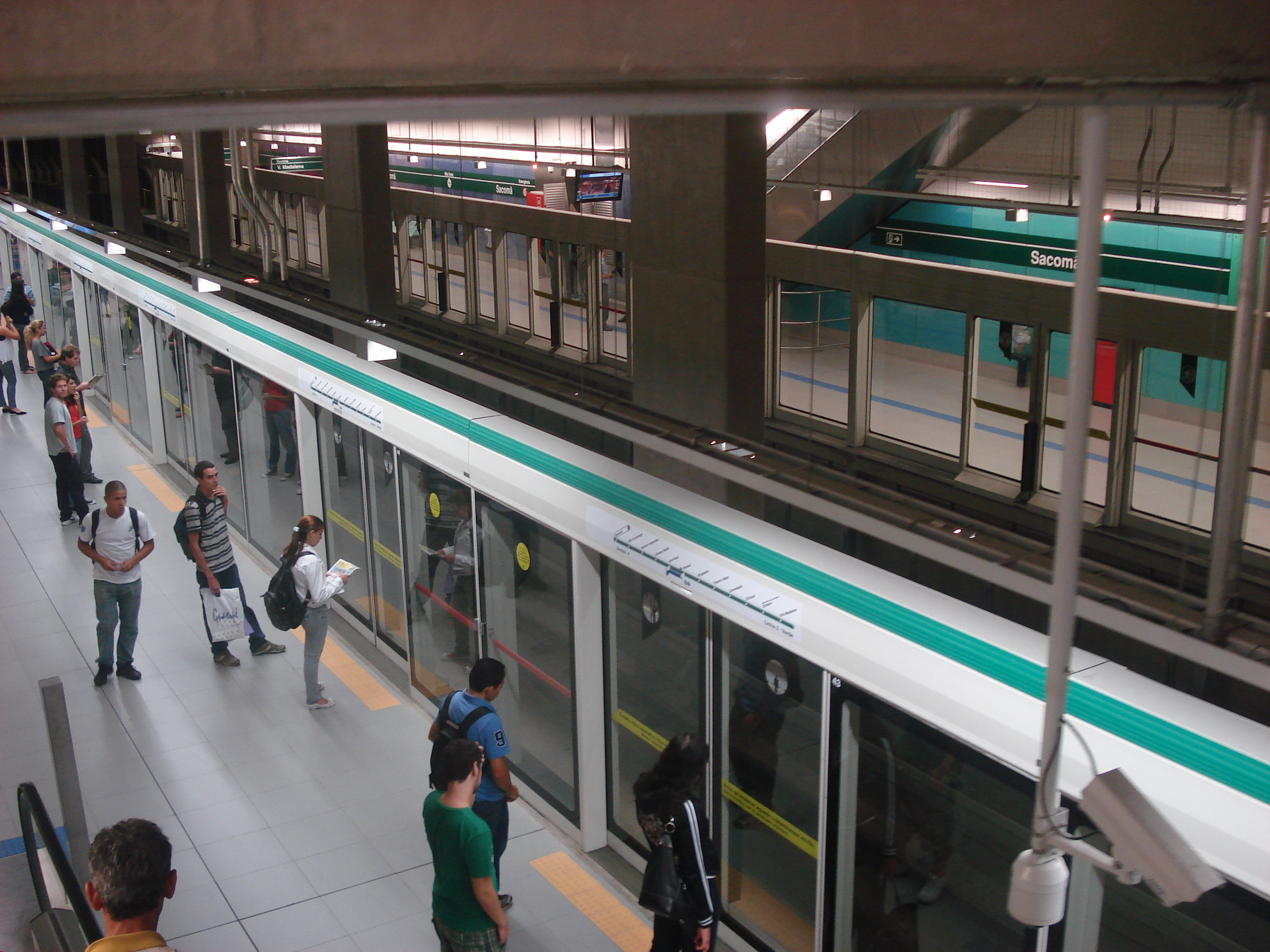
- Sacomã station

Overview
- Status: Operational
- Owner: Government of the State of São Paulo
- Locale: São Paulo, Brazil
- Termini: Vila Madalena; Vila Prudente
- Connecting lines: Current: Future: Planned: 16 19 20
- Stations: 14 in operation 14 under construction

Service
- Type: Rapid transit
- System: São Paulo Metro
- Operator(s): CMSP
- Depot(s): Tamanduateí rail yard Rapadura train park (under construction); Penha train park (under construction); Paulo Freire rail yard (under construction)
- Rolling stock: 150 Alstom/Siemens I stock (25 trains); 36 Bombardier/Tejofran/Temoinsa J stock (6 trains)
- Daily ridership: 431,000/business day

History
- Commenced: 1987
- Opened: January 25, 1991; 35 years ago
- Last extension: August 21, 2010

Technical
- Line length: 14.7 km (9.1 mi)
- Track gauge: 1,600 mm (5 ft 3 in)
- Electrification: 750 V DC third rail
- Operating speed: 87 km/h (54 mph)
- Signalling: Alstom Urbalis CBTC

Line 2 (Green) (Portuguese: Linha 2–Verde) is one of the six lines that make up the São Paulo Metro, and one of the thirteen lines that make up the Metropolitan Rail Transportation Network. It currently runs between the Vila Madalena and Vila Prudente stations. The line is also called, and was originally known as, the Paulista Line, because it goes along much of the Avenida Paulista, one of the leading financial centers in São Paulo. Despite being the second line to be planned, it was the third to be built—the second line built was actually Line 3 (Red). This line connects the West and South-East regions.

== History ==
The first section of Line 2 (Green Line), initially called the Paulista Line, was built using the New Austrian Tunnelling Method. The line opened on January 25, 1991, having at that time a length of 2.9 kilometres (1.8 mi) and four stations. With this line, the metro system was extended to include a major axis of the expanded center of São Paulo, with a large concentration of financial institutions, hospitals, schools, hotels, consulates, offices of state radio and television, theaters, and museums. The following year, the Ana Rosa and Clínicas stations were opened, increasing the line's length to 4.7 kilometres (2.9 mi). In 1998, two new stations (Vila Madalena and Santuário Nossa Senhora de Fátima-Sumaré) were completed, adding a further 2.3-kilometre (1.4 mi) stretch.

On March 30, 2006, the then-Governor Geraldo Alckmin on his last day in office opened the Santos-Imigrantes station. Shortly after, on May 9, 2006, the Chácara Klabin station was formally opened by the subsequent Governor Claudio Lembo, thus completing the 2.9-kilometre (1.8 mi) stretch between Ana Rosa and Santos-Imigrantes, making the line a total of 9.9 kilometres (6.2 mi) long.

On June 30, 2007, the Governor José Serra opened the Alto do Ipiranga station, located at the junction of Avenida Dr. Gentil de Moura and Rua Visconde de Piraja, bringing the metro network in São Paulo to a total length of 61 kilometres (37.9 mi), with a forecast of passenger demand on Line 2 of 370,000 people per day. Jose Serra published a decree and authorization to extend the line to Vila Prudente, adding the Sacomã, Tamanduateí and Vila Prudente stations.

On May 10, 2007, during the Papal visit of Benedict XVI to the city of São Paulo, Line 2 had the highest demand of its history up until then, carrying 370,226 passengers. During the weekend of May 17–18, 2008, Line 2 was temporarily shut down between the stations Clínicas and Consolação to allow the use of a tunnel boring machine just seven meters (23 ft 0 in) below the level of its tunnel being used for the extension project of Line 4 (Yellow). The current record of passengers carried by the line was on May 7, 2008, with 428,056 passengers.

On March 28, 2009, the first of the sixteen new trains came into operation for the inauguration of the Sacomã - Vila Prudente stretch. On January 10, 2010, Sacomã station was opened to the public, initially only in operation from 10:30 to 15:00 and then from the 22nd, from 10:00 to 16:00. Finally, on the 30th of that month, it was fully opened to the public. Although the extension project of Line 2 was the only one to receive the whole amount in 2009, the schedule was delayed—the opening of the Tamanduateí and Vila Prudente stations originally scheduled for March 2010 was postponed. On August 18 it was announced that the opening of Vila Prudente station would happen just three days later. On September 21, the Tamanduateí station opened.

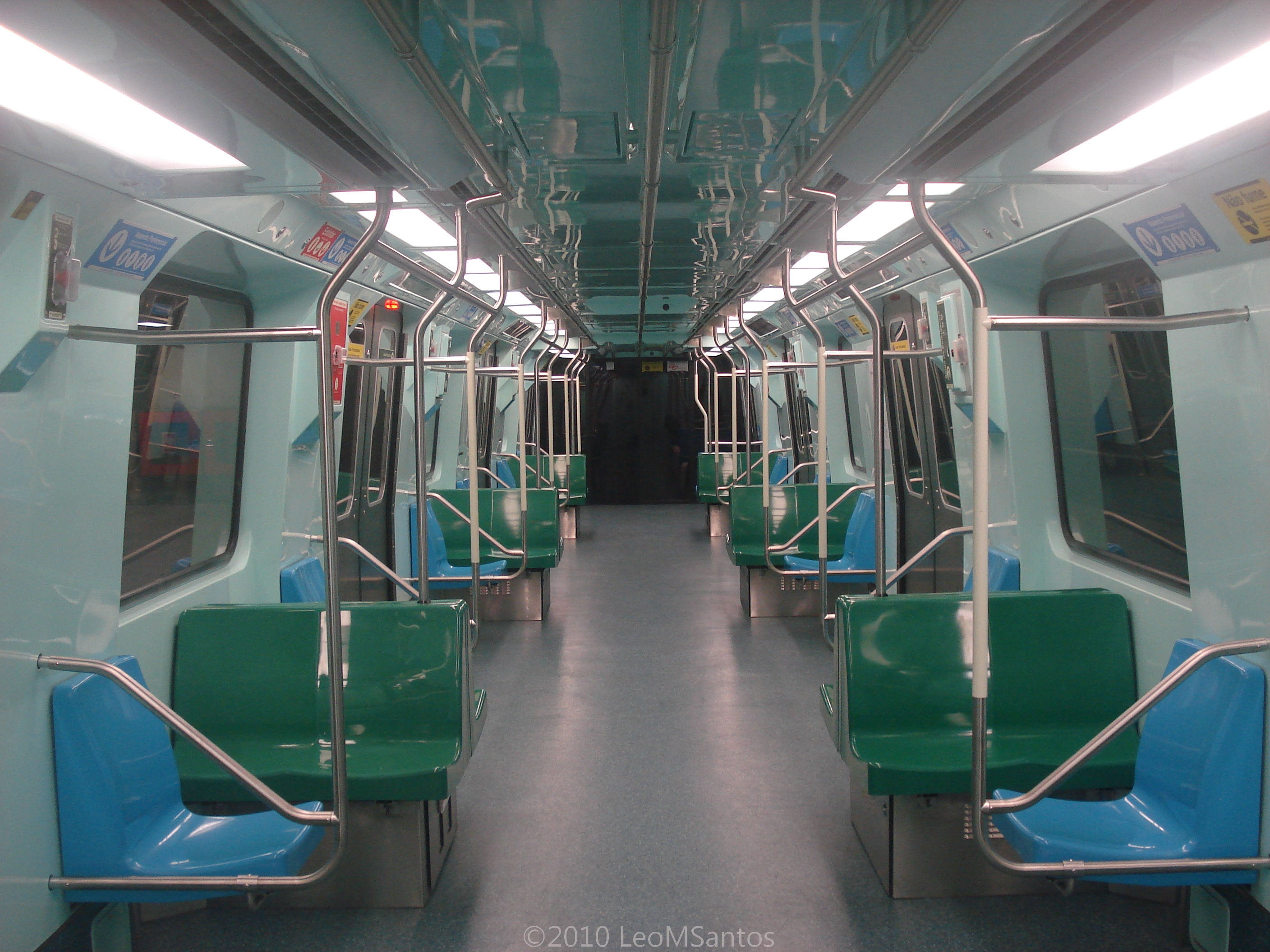
Inside view of an Alstom type G train

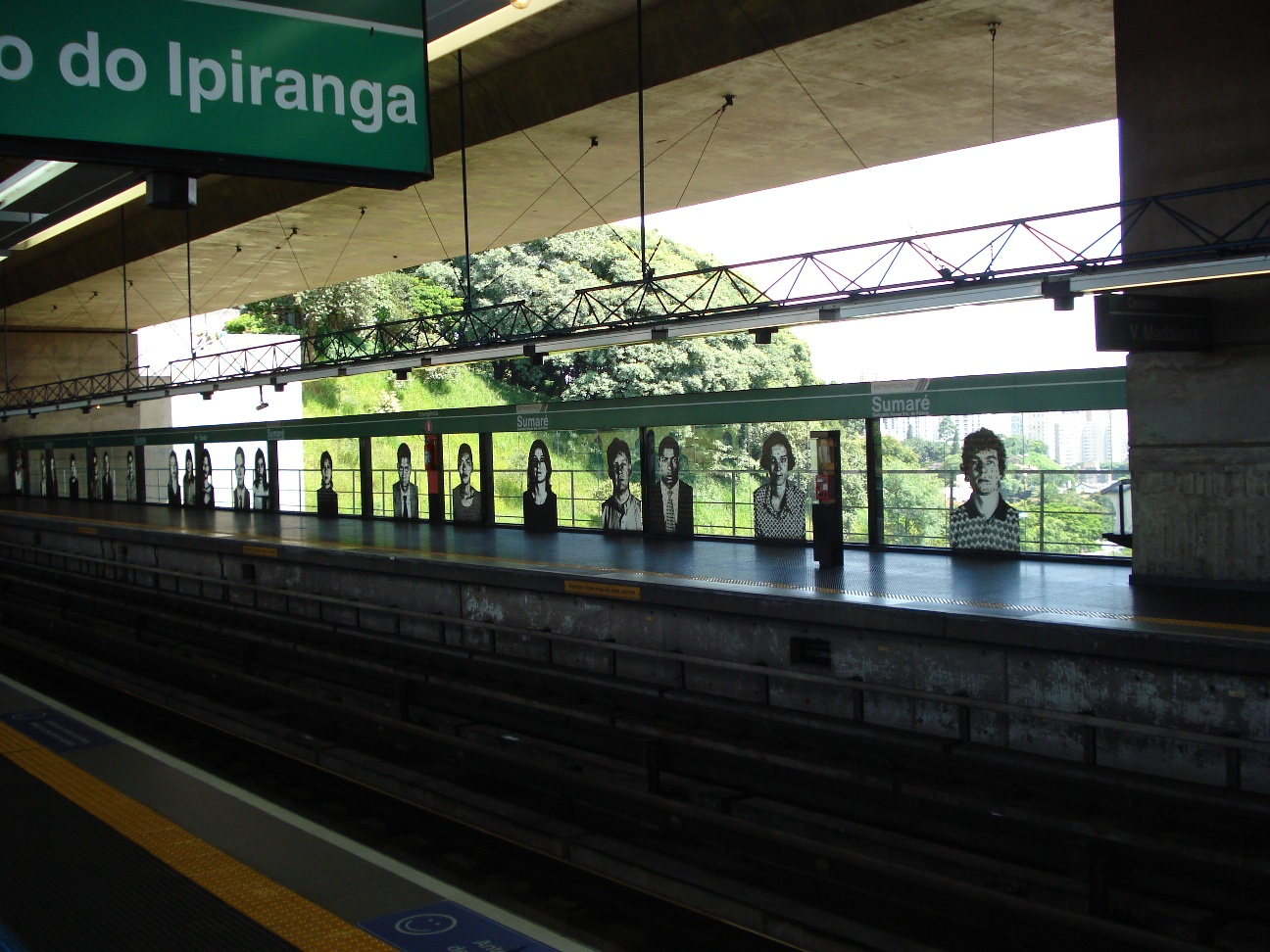
Platform of Santuário Nossa Senhora de Fátima-Sumaré Station

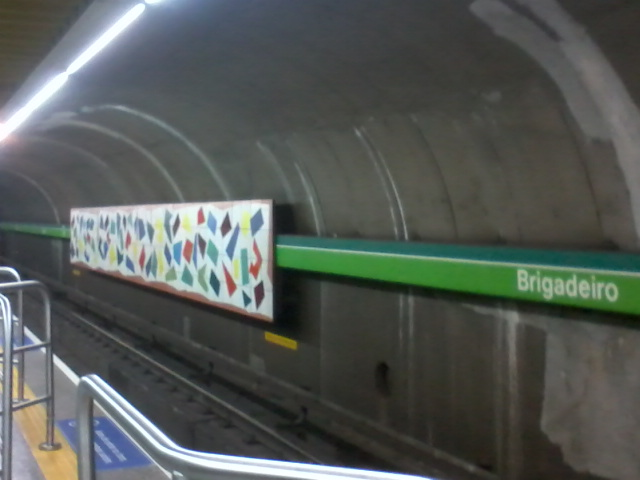
Brigadeiro Station platform

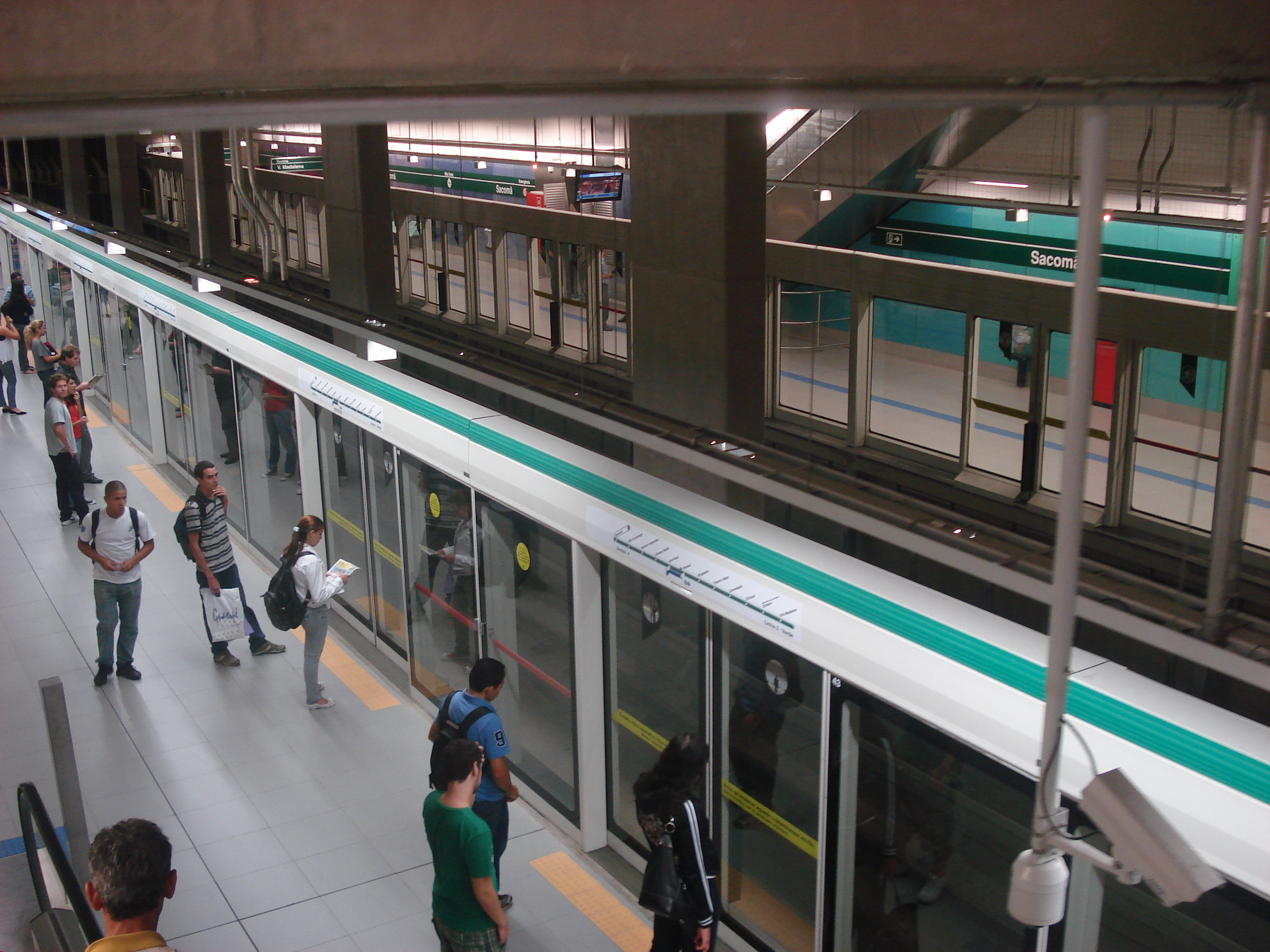
Sacomã Station is one of the most modern metro stations in Latin America

== Stations ==
The Santos-Imigrantes station is semi-elevated with metal and concrete structures that support the roof of the station. The Santuário Nossa Senhora de Fátima-Sumaré station is elevated and situated in a valley (under the Dr. Arnold viaduct). The Tamanduateí station is elevated with concrete structures mixed with metal, supporting the arched ceiling. All other stations are underground. The Trianon-Masp, Consolação, Brigadeiro, Ana Rosa, Chácara Klabin, and Santos-Imigrantes stations are composed of island platforms. The other station use the more common side platforms.

The line also integrates with Line 15 (Silver) and the extension of Line 5 (Lilac).

Code	Station	Platforms	Position	Connections	District
COA	Cerro Corá	Side platforms	Underground	20 (Planned)	Between Pinheiros and Lapa
VMD	Vila Madalena	Side platforms	Underground	Vila Madalena Bus Terminal	Between Pinheiros and Perdizes
SUM	Santuário Nossa Senhora de Fátima-Sumaré	Side platforms	Elevated	-	Between Perdizes and Jardim Paulista
CLI	Clínicas	Side platforms	Underground	-	Between Consolação and Jardim Paulista
CNS	Consolação	Island platforms	Underground	Campo Limpo–Rebouças–Centro Bus Corridor	Between Consolação and Jardim Paulista
TRI	Trianon-Masp	Island platforms	Underground	-	Between Bela Vista and Jardim Paulista
BGD	Brigadeiro	Island platforms	Underground	-	Between Bela Vista and Vila Mariana
PSO	Paraíso	Side platforms	Underground	Line 1 (São Paulo Metro)	Vila Mariana
ANR	Ana Rosa	Island platforms	Underground	16 (Planned); Ana Rosa Bus Terminal	Vila Mariana
CKB	Chácara Klabin	Island platforms	Underground	Line 5 (São Paulo Metro)	Vila Mariana
IMG	Santos-Imigrantes	Island platforms	Elevated	-	Cursino
AIP	Alto do Ipiranga	Side platforms	Underground	-	Ipiranga
SAC	Sacomã	Side platforms	Underground	Sacomã Bus Terminal; Expresso Tiradentes; BRT ABC (Future)	Ipiranga
TTI	Tamanduateí	Side platforms	Elevated	BRT ABC (Future)	Between Ipiranga and Vila Prudente
VPT	Vila Prudente	Side platforms	Underground	Vila Prudente Bus Terminal; Expresso Tiradentes	Vila Prudente
**OFT**	**Orfanato**	Side platforms	Underground	-	Vila Prudente
**TBA**	**Santa Clara**	Side platforms	Underground	Santa Clara Bus Terminal (Future)	Água Rasa
**ANF**	**Anália Franco**	Side platforms	Underground	16 (Planned)	Água Rasa
**VFO**	**Vila Formosa**	Side platforms	Underground	Vila Formosa Bus Terminal (Future)	Vila Formosa
**TBA**	**Santa Isabel**	Side platforms	Underground	-	Carrão
**GUI**	**Guilherme Giorgi**	Side platforms	Underground	-	Carrão
**ARI**	**Aricanduva**	Side platforms	Underground	-	Vila Matilde
**PEN**	**Penha**	Side platforms	Underground	(Future); Penha Bus Terminal	Penha
**PEF**	**Penha de França**	Side platforms	Underground	-	Penha
**TIC**	**Gabriela Mistral**	Side platforms	Underground	Tiquatira Bus Terminal (Planned); Guarulhos–São Paulo Metropolitan Corridor (Planned) (Planned)	Cangaíba
**TBA**	**Fernão Dias**	Side platforms	Underground	-	Cangaíba
**PGD**	**Ponte Grande**	Side platforms	Underground	-	Ponte Grande (Guarulhos)
**DUT**	**Dutra**	Side platforms	Underground	19 (Planned); Dutra Bus Terminal (Planned)	Vila Augusta (Guarulhos)

- Note: Stations in **bold** are under construction; stations in italic are in planning.

== Expansion plans ==
=== Vila Prudente ↔ Cidade Tiradentes ===
In May 2009 a joint delegation of the city and the state of São Paulo visited the monorail system in Tokyo to begin planning the implementation of a monorail to extend Line 2 (Green) from Vila Prudente to Cidade Tiradentes. On November 6, 2009, international bidding was opened in order to build the monorail system. On November 23, 2009, construction on the Vila Prudente-Oratório was started. The system will be 23.8 kilometres (14.8 mi) long between Vila Prudente and Cidade Tiradentes and will have 17 stations (Vila Prudente, Oratório, São Lucas, Vila Tolstoi, Vila União, Jardim Planalto, Sapopemba, Fazenda da Juta, São Mateus, Jardim Colonial, Iguatemi, Jaquiriça, Bento Guelf, Érico Semer, Márcio Beck, and Cidade Tiradentes) and 54 trains, each capable of carrying 1000 passengers. The line is projected to carry around 510,000 passengers daily.

However, it was decided in September 2012, that the eastward extension monorail to Cidade Tiradentes will be named Line 15, and Line 2 will be extended northwards from Vila Prudente to Dutra. The extension will be 13.3 km (8.3 mi) long and have 13 stations. Funds were approved in mid-2012 for the first section (4.6 km or 2.9 mi), which includes the Orfanato, Santa Clara, Anália Franco and Vila Formosa stations. This section is expected to open in 2017 or 2018.

=== Vila Madalena ↔ Cerro Corá ===
In addition, there are plans to expand Line 2 (Green) 2.9 kilometres (1.8 mi) from Vila Madalena station to Avenida Cerro Corá, in the neighborhood of Lapa.
