= Clínicas (São Paulo Metro) =

São Paulo Metro station

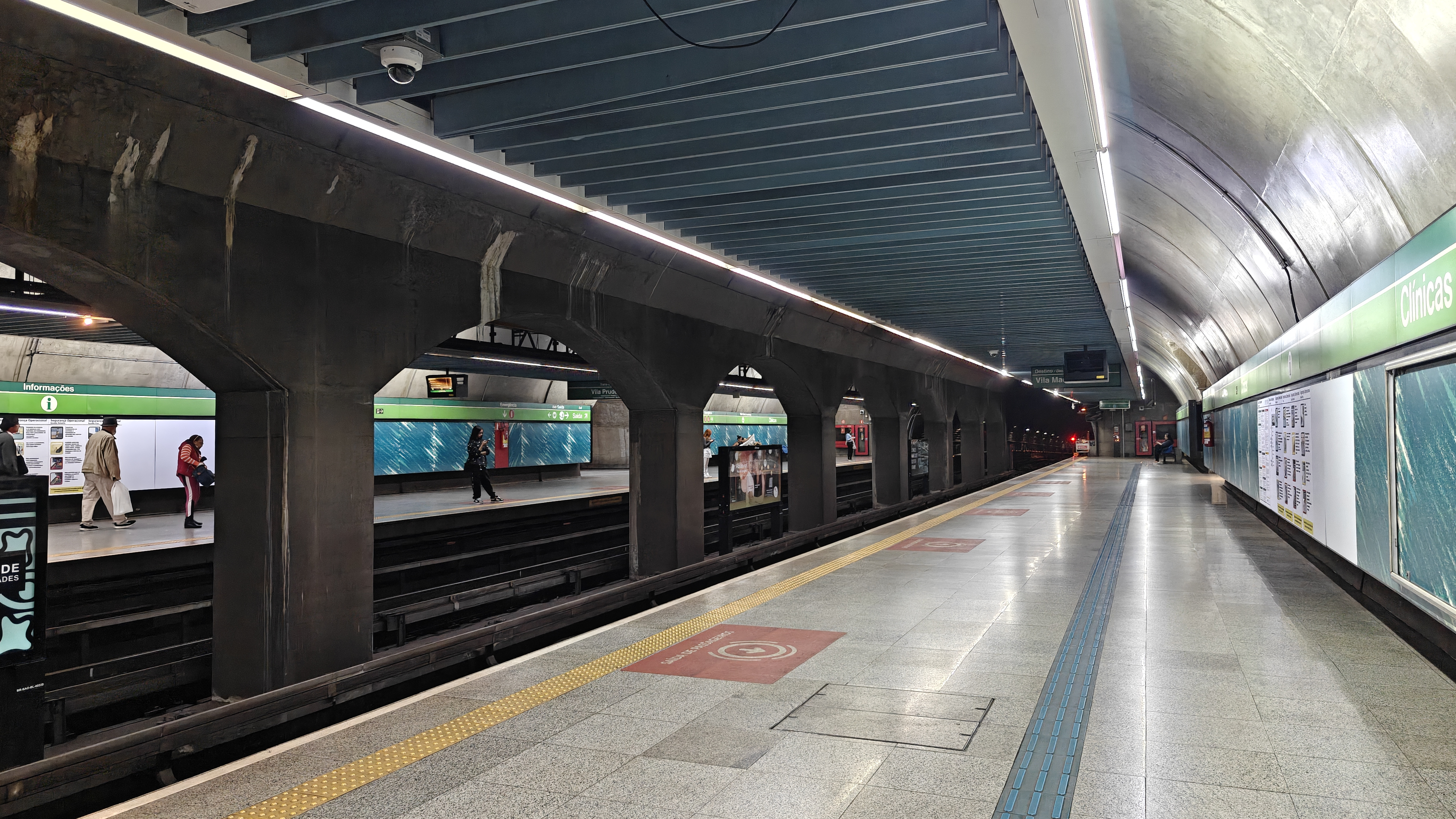
- Clínicas station

General information
- Location: Av. Dr. Arnaldo, 555, Jardim Paulista; São Paulo; Brazil
- Coordinates: 23°33′16″S 46°40′14″W
- Owner: Government of the State of São Paulo
- Operator: Companhia do Metropolitano de São Paulo
- Platforms: Side platforms

Construction
- Structure type: Underground
- Accessible: Y

Other information
- Station code: CLI

History
- Opened: September 12, 1992; 33 years ago

Passengers
- 19,000/business day

Services
Preceding station	São Paulo Metro	Following station
Santuário Nossa Senhora de Fátima-Sumaré towards Vila Madalena	Line 2	Consolação towards Penha
Track layout
Location

Clínicas is a station on Line 2 (Green) of the São Paulo Metro. The station is connected to the main complex of the Hospital das Clínicas.

== Station layout ==
G	Street level	Exit/entrance
M	Mezzanine	Fare control, ticket office, customer service, Bilhete Único/BOM recharge machines
P Platform level	Side platform, doors open on the right
P Platform level	Northbound	← toward Vila Madalena
P Platform level	Southbound	toward Vila Prudente →
P Platform level	Side platform, doors open on the right
