= Brigadeiro (São Paulo Metro) =

São Paulo Metro station

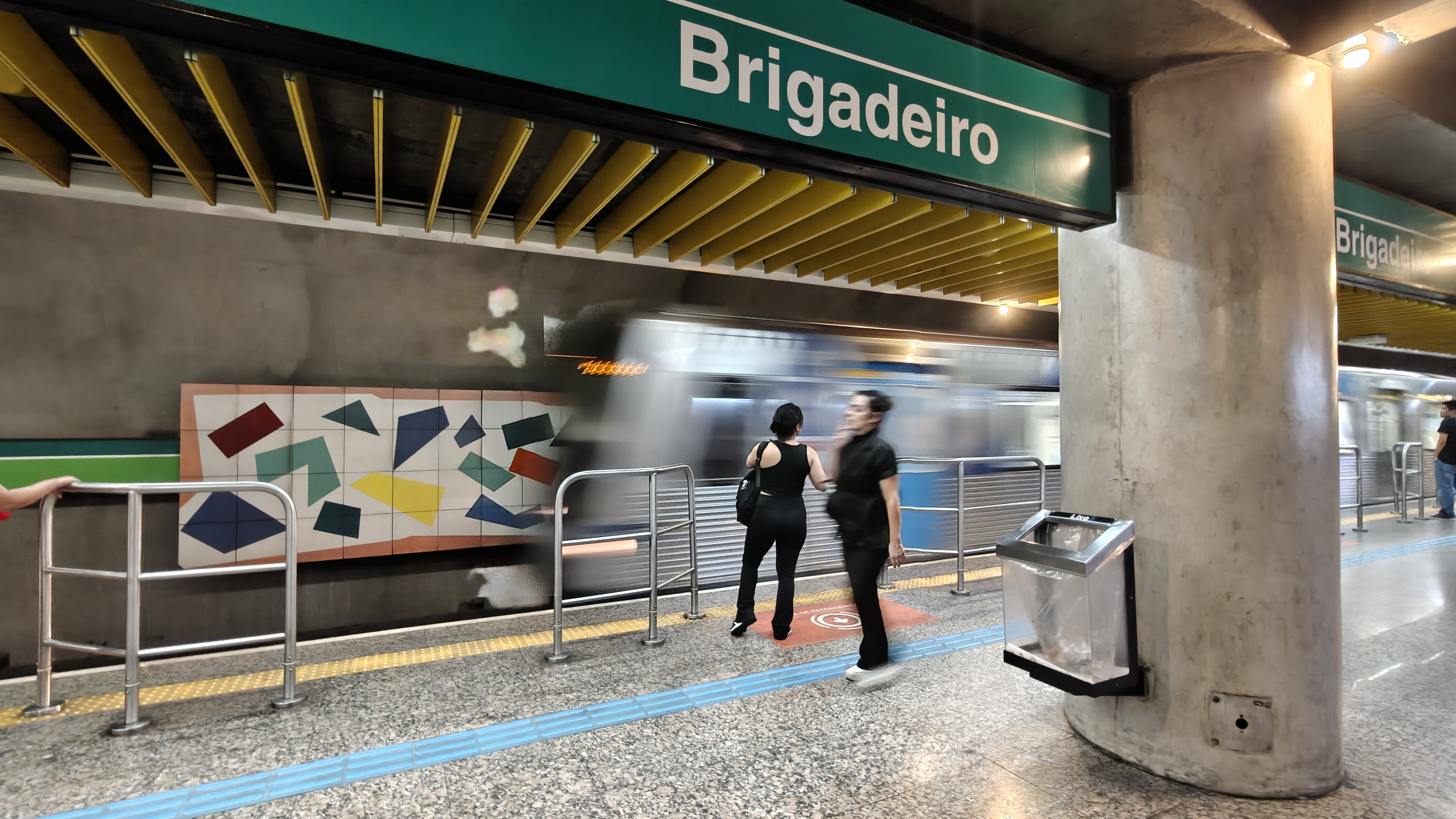
- Brigadeiro station

General information
- Location: Av Paulista, s/n, Bela Vista; São Paulo; Brazil
- Coordinates: 23°34′05″S 46°38′53″W
- Owner: Government of the State of São Paulo
- Operator: Companhia do Metropolitano de São Paulo
- Platforms: Island platforms

Construction
- Structure type: Underground
- Accessible: Y
- Architect: Roberto McFadden

Other information
- Station code: BGD

History
- Opened: January 25, 1991; 35 years ago

Passengers
- 42,000/business day

Services
Preceding station	São Paulo Metro	Following station
Trianon-Masp towards Vila Madalena	Line 2	Paraíso towards Penha
Track layout
Location

Brigadeiro is a station on Line 2 (Green) of the São Paulo Metro.

== Station layout ==
G	Street level	Exit/entrance
M	Mezzanine	Fare control, ticket office, customer service, Bilhete Único/BOM recharge machines
P Platform level
P Platform level	Northbound	← toward Vila Madalena
P Platform level	Island platform, doors open on the left
P Platform level	Southbound	toward Vila Prudente →
