= Alto do Ipiranga (São Paulo Metro) =

São Paulo Metro station, Brazil

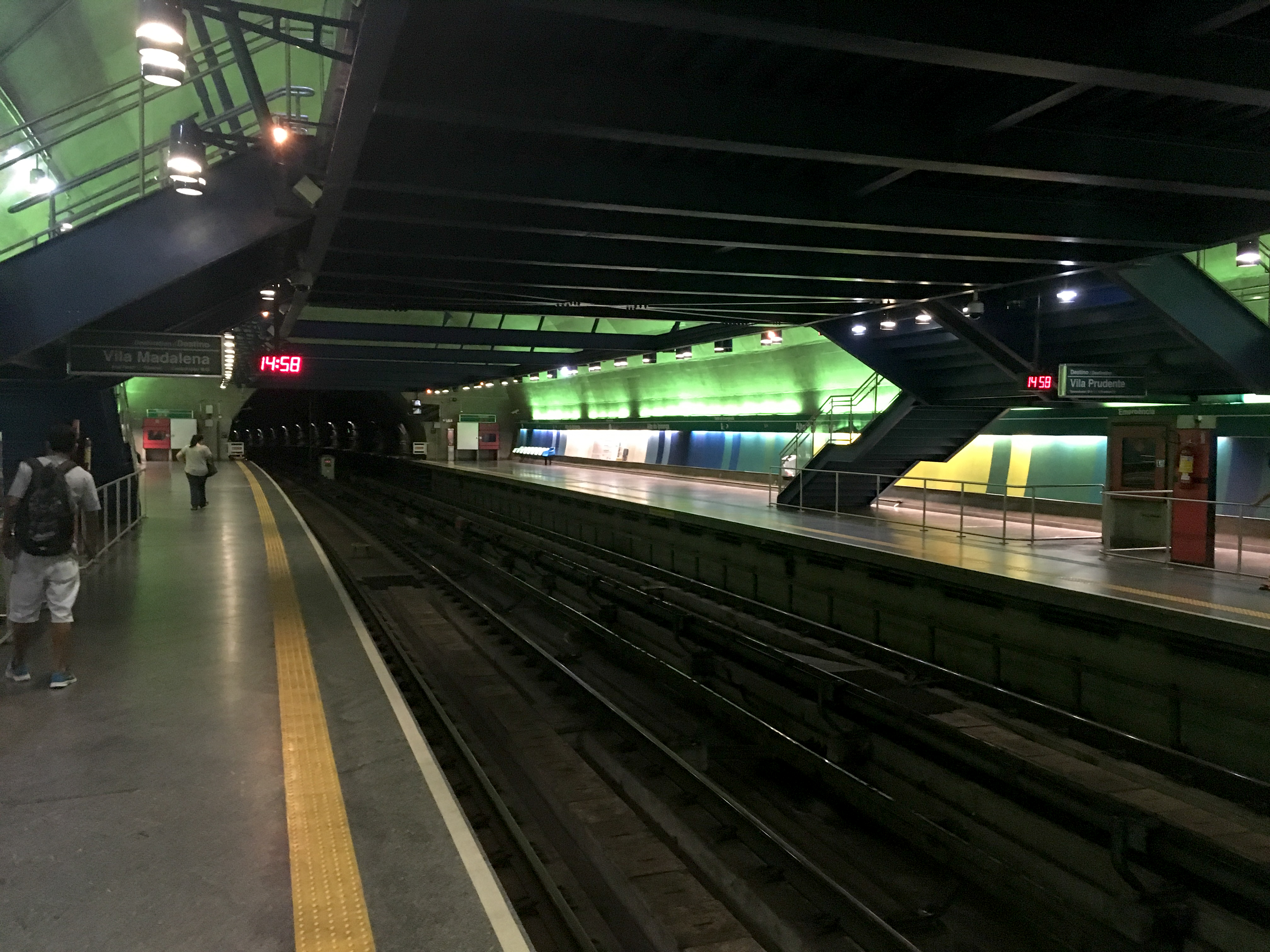
- Alto do Ipiranga metro station (Linha 2-Verde), SP, 2025-07-13 (6).jpg

General information
- Location: Av. Dr. Gentil de Moura, 231, Ipiranga; São Paulo; Brazil
- Coordinates: 23°36′08″S 46°36′45″W
- Owner: Government of the State of São Paulo
- Operator: Companhia do Metropolitano de São Paulo
- Platforms: Side platforms

Construction
- Structure type: Underground
- Accessible: Y
- Architect: Ilvio Silva Artioli

Other information
- Station code: AIP

History
- Opened: June 30, 2007; 19 years ago
- Former names: Ipiranga

Passengers
- 17,000/business day

Services
Preceding station	São Paulo Metro	Following station
Santos-Imigrantes towards Vila Madalena	Line 2	Sacomã towards Penha
Track layout
Location

Alto do Ipiranga is a station on Line 2 (Green) of the São Paulo Metro.

== Station layout ==
G	Street level	Exit/entrance
M	Mezzanine	Fare control, ticket office, customer service, Bilhete Único/BOM recharge machines
P Platform level
P Platform level	Side platform, doors open on the right
P Platform level	Northbound	← toward Vila Madalena
P Platform level	Southbound	toward Vila Prudente →
P Platform level	Side platform, doors open on the right
