= Trianon-Masp (São Paulo Metro) =

Railway station in São Paulo, Brazil

Trianon–Masp
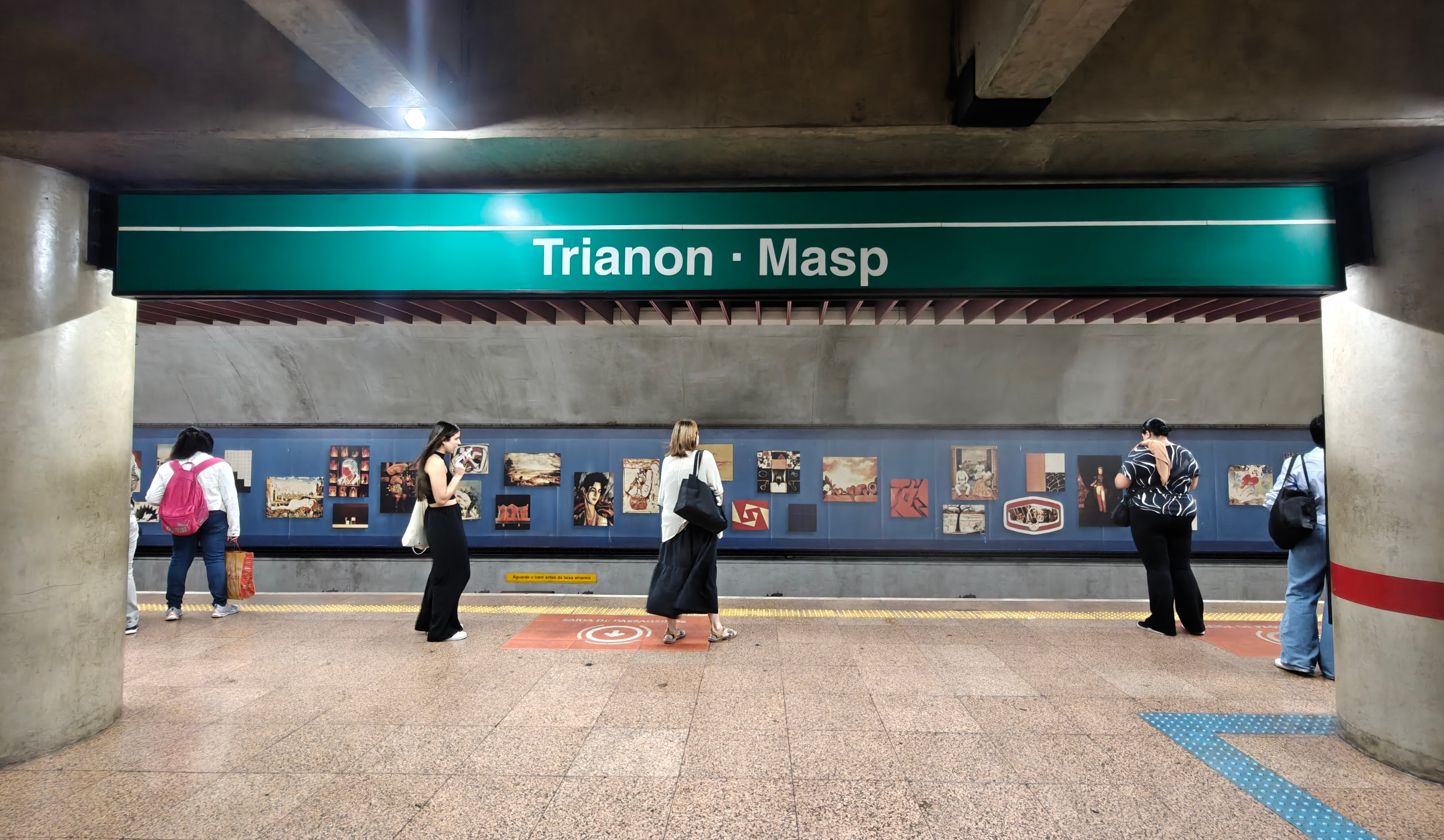
- Trianon-Masp station

General information
- Location: Av. Paulista, s/n, Jardim Paulista; São Paulo; Brazil
- Coordinates: 23°33′45″S 46°39′18″W
- Owner: Government of the State of São Paulo
- Operator: Companhia do Metropolitano de São Paulo
- Platforms: Island platforms

Construction
- Structure type: Underground
- Accessible: Y

Other information
- Station code: TRI

History
- Opened: January 25, 1991; 35 years ago
- Former names: Trianon

Passengers
- 39,000/business day

Services
Preceding station	São Paulo Metro	Following station
Consolação towards Vila Madalena	Line 2	Brigadeiro towards Penha
Track layout
Location

Trianon–Masp is a station on Line 2 (Green) of the São Paulo Metro. The acronym "MASP" stands for São Paulo Museum of Art, and the name "Trianon" is from the Trianon Park, both south of the station.

== Station layout ==
G	Street level	Exit/entrance
M	Mezzanine	Fare control, ticket office, customer service, Bilhete Único/BOM recharge machines
P Platform level
P Platform level	Northbound	← toward Vila Madalena
P Platform level	Island platform, doors open on the left
P Platform level	Southbound	toward Vila Prudente →
