= Santuário Nossa Senhora de Fátima-Sumaré (São Paulo Metro) =

São Paulo Metro station

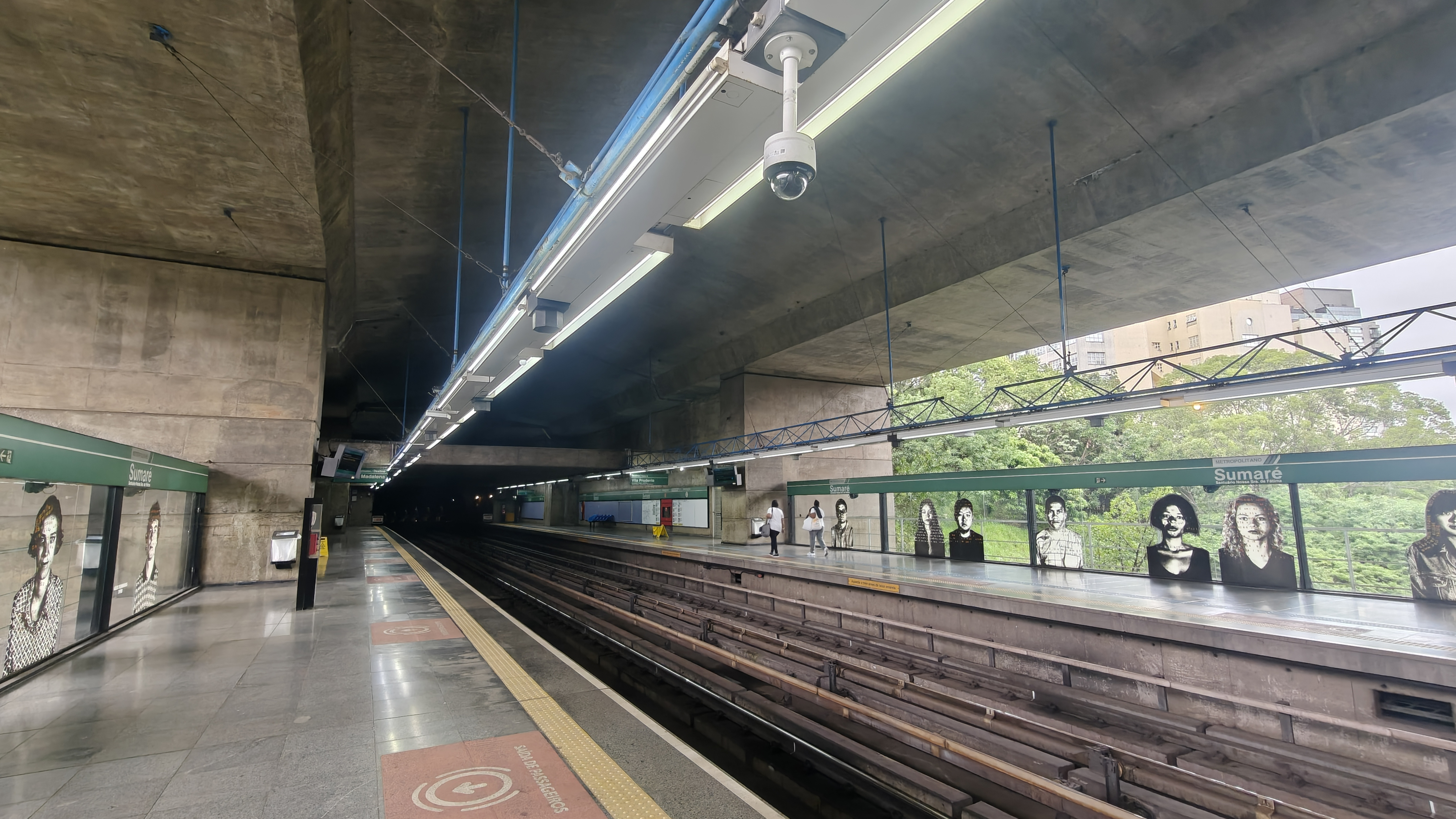
- Platforms of Sumaré metro station

General information
- Location: Av. Dr. Arnaldo, 1470, Perdizes; São Paulo; Brazil
- Coordinates: 23°33′02″S 46°40′39″W
- Owner: Government of the State of São Paulo
- Operator: Companhia do Metropolitano de São Paulo
- Platforms: Side platforms

Construction
- Structure type: Elevated
- Accessible: Y

Other information
- Station code: SUM

History
- Opened: November 21, 1998; 27 years ago
- Former names: Sumaré

Passengers
- 8,000/business day

Services
Preceding station	São Paulo Metro	Following station
Vila Madalena Terminus	Line 2	Clínicas towards Penha
Track layout
Location

Santuário Nossa Senhora de Fátima-Sumaré is a station on Line 2 (Green) of the São Paulo Metro.

== Station layout ==
G	Street level	Exit/entrance
M	Mezzanine	Fare control, ticket office, customer service, Bilhete Único/BOM recharge machines
P Platform level	Side platform, doors open on the right
P Platform level	Northbound	← toward Vila Madalena
P Platform level	Southbound	toward Vila Prudente →
P Platform level	Side platform, doors open on the right
