= Jardim Paulista =

District of São Paulo, Brazil

Coordinates: 22°53′S 43°34′W

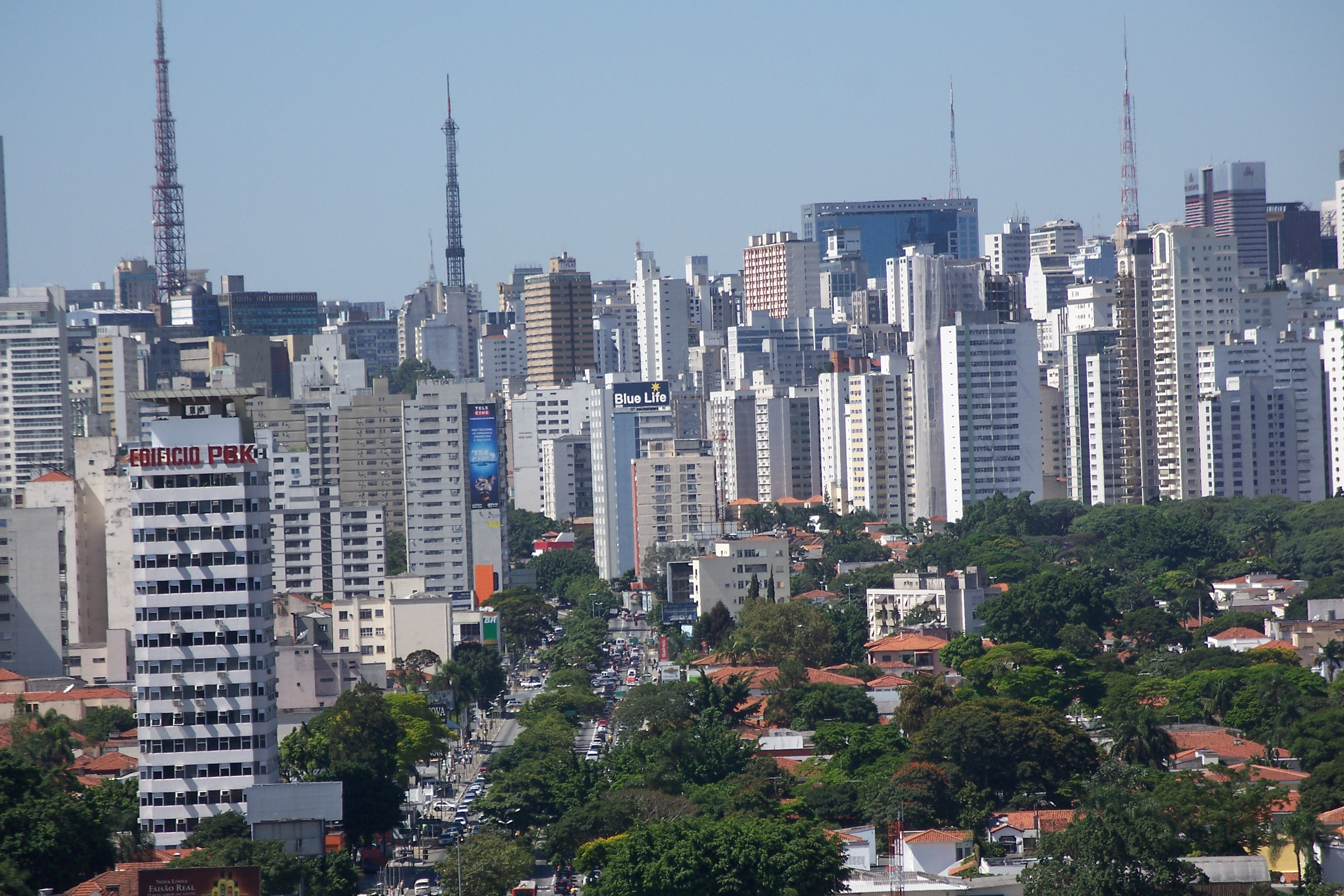
- Aerial view of the district

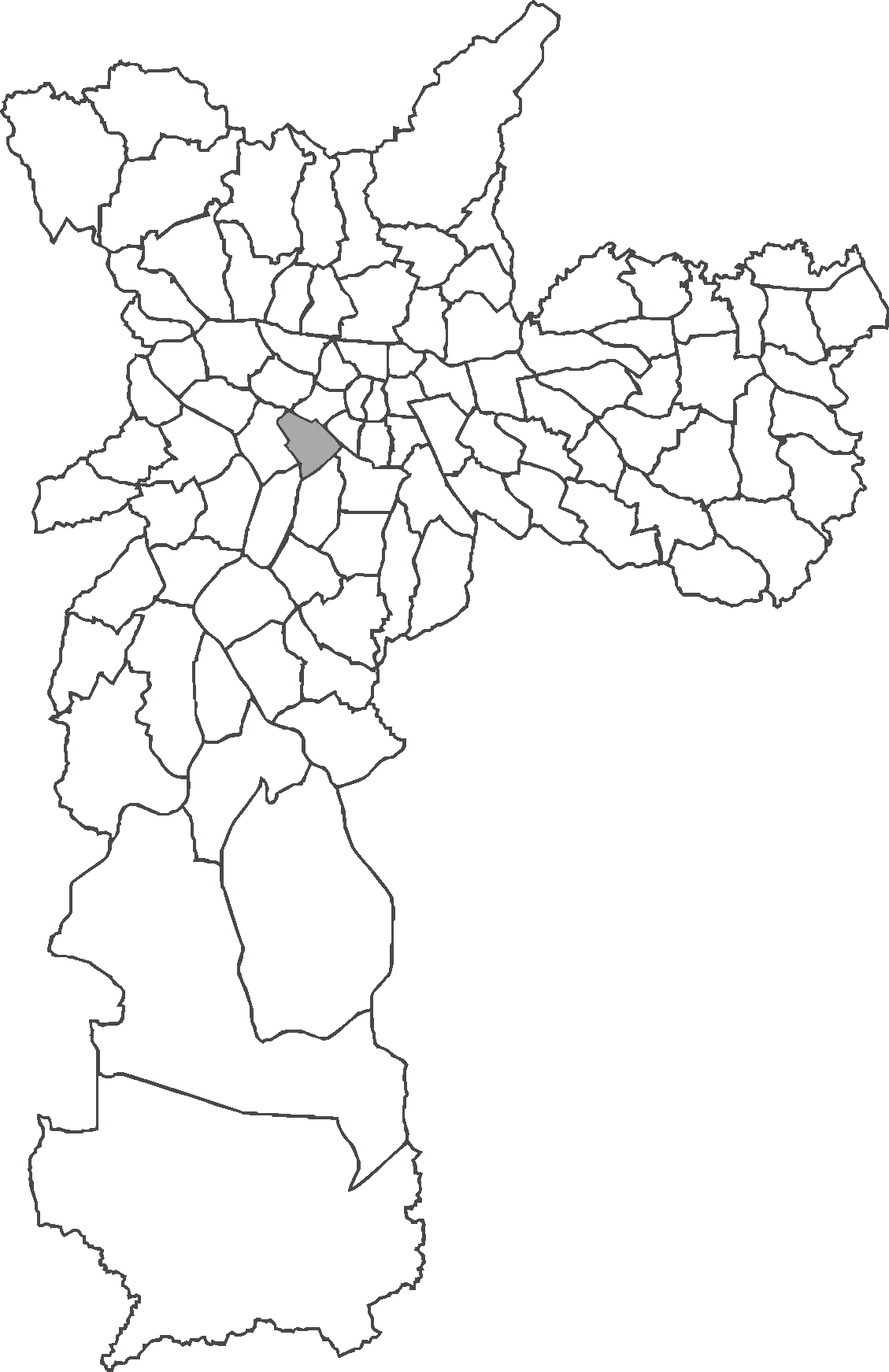
- Location in the city of São Paulo
- Country: Brazil
- State: São Paulo
- City: São Paulo

Government
  - Type: Subprefecture
  - Subprefect: Coronel Bucheroni

Area
  - Total: 6.1 km^{2} (2.4 sq mi)

Population (2000)
  - Total: 83,667
  - Density: 13,716/km^{2} (35,520/sq mi)
- HDI: 0.957 –high
- Website: Subprefecture of Pinheiros

Jardim Paulista is a district in the subprefecture of Pinheiros in the city of São Paulo, Brazil. The neighbourhood of the same name, located within the district, is one of the neighbourhoods that make up the larger region of Jardins, and borders the neighbourhoods of Consolação, Cerqueira César and Paraíso.

Jardim Paulista is the area delimited by Paulista Avenue, Peixoto Gomide Street, 9 de Julho Avenue, São Gabriel Avenue, República do Líbano Avenue, and Brigadeiro Luís Antônio Avenue. Many of the streets in Jardim Paulista are named after other municipalities in the state of São Paulo.

== Points of interest ==
Since the district includes Paulista Avenue (the side to the direction of Marginal Pinheiros), many of the famous landmarks on the avenue are part of the district, such as the São Paulo Art Museum (MASP), Trianon Park, and the Conjunto Nacional commercial center.

=== Companies ===
Retail conglomerate Grupo Pão de Açúcar has its headquarters in the district. Political consulting firm Cambridge Analytica had an office in the district in 2018.

== Infrastructure ==
=== Transport ===
The district is served by Metro Line 2-Green at Trianon-Masp, Consolação and Clínicas stations and by Line 4-Yellow at Oscar Freire station.

== See also ==
- Jardins
