= Vila Mariana (district of São Paulo) =

District of São Paulo, Brazil

Coordinates: 23°35′S 46°38′W

- Neighborhood of São Paulo
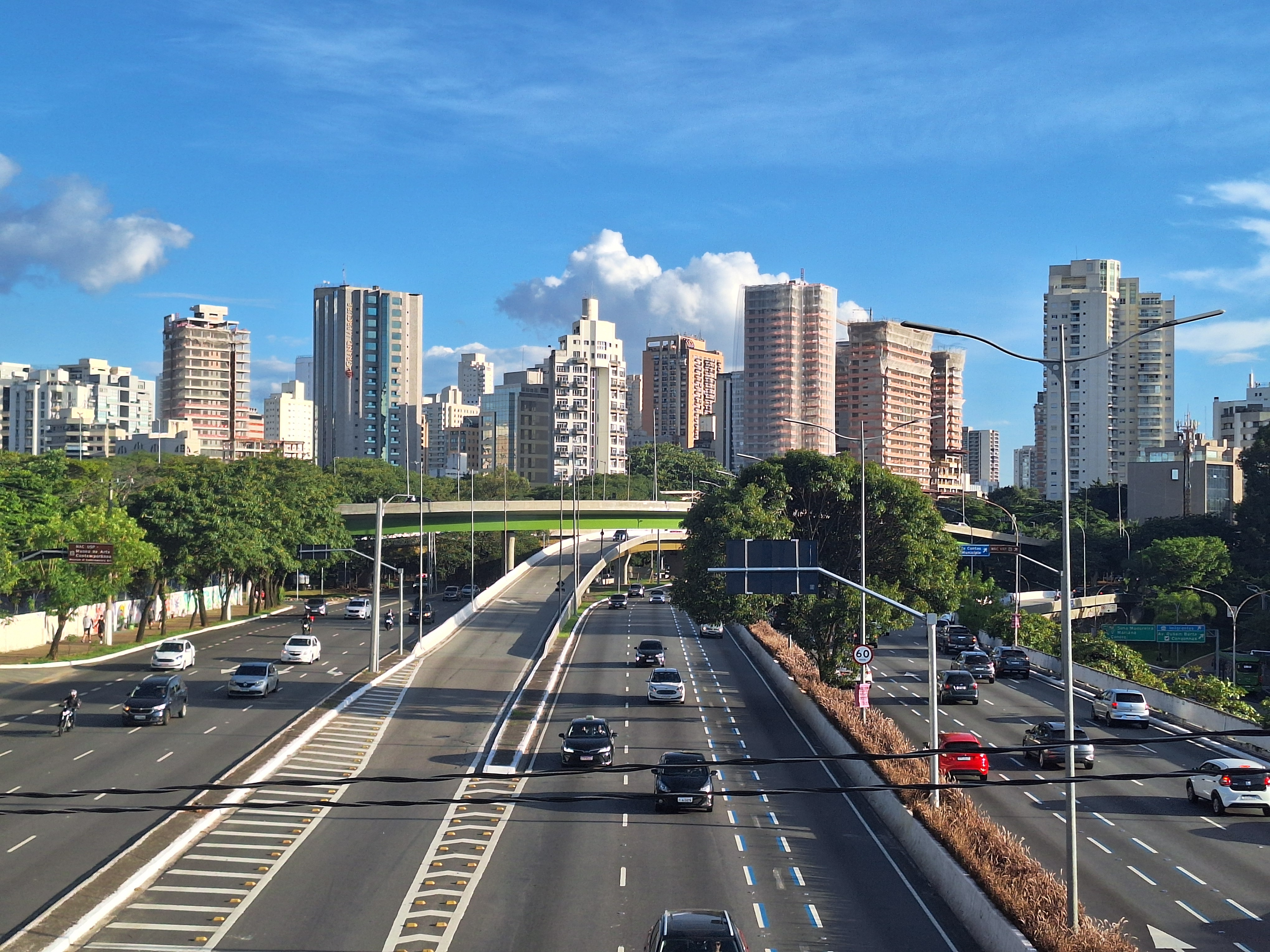
- Interactive map of Vila Mariana
- Country: Brazil
- State: São Paulo
- City: São Paulo
- Subprefecture: Vila Mariana

Government
  - Type: Subprefecture
  - Subprefect: Maurício de Oliveira Pinterich

Area
  - Total: 8.6 km^{2} (3.3 sq mi)

Population (2022)
  - Total: 127,286
  - Density: 15,000/km^{2} (38,000/sq mi)

Vila Mariana (Portuguese pronunciation: [ˈvilɐ maɾiˈɐnɐ]) is a borough of the city of São Paulo, Brazil. Located to the south of Bela Vista and Liberdade, east of Jardim Paulista and west of Ipiranga, it is a dynamic area of the city. Similar to its neighbor district, Moema, it is a wealthy area and it comprises some of the most famous symbols of São Paulo, like the Ibirapuera Park, the Obelisk and Mausoleum of the heroes from the Constitutionalist Revolution in 1932 and the "Monumento às Bandeiras", and the Fundadores de São Paulo monument.

The district also has in its limits the headquarters of the Federal University of São Paulo and its medicine school.

Until the early 20th century, it used to be a stop for chariots and horse riders on the way to Jabaquara from the central area of São Paulo. The whole trip would take an entire day, but now it is commutable by car within less than 30 minutes.

Vila Mariana is also the area where Athina Onassis lived, when married to Brazilian horse rider Álvaro Alfonso de Miranda Neto.
