= BRT ABC =

Sao Paulo bus rapid transit system

Overview
- Owner: ARTESP
- Area served: São Paulo; São Caetano do Sul; Santo André; São Bernardo do Campo
- Transit type: Bus rapid transit
- Number of stations: 19
- Website: brtabc.com.br

Operation
- Operation will start: 2023 (estimated)
- Operator: Next Mobilidade
- Number of vehicles: 82 23 m (75 ft) battery electric buses

Technical
- System length: 17.3 kilometres (10.7 mi)
- Average speed: 25 km/h (16 mph)
- Top speed: 40 km/h (25 mph)

BRT ABC is a future bus rapid transit (BRT) system for the southwest Greater São Paulo as a successor of the São Paulo Metro Line 18-Bronze monorail project, cancelled in 2019 by governor João Doria.

== Characteristics ==
The system will have 82 battery electric buses distributed in 3 different lines of same route, but with different services. The local line will stop by all of the 20 stations and 3 terminals, with medium speed of 19 km/h (12 mph) and headway of 4 minutes during peak hours. The semi-express line will attend the 3 terminals and 5 interest stations with medium speed of 23 km/h (14 mph) and headway of 3 minutes during peak hours. The express line will only attend the 3 terminals with headway of 8 minutes and medium speed of 25 km/h (16 mph).

== History ==
In May 2021, the construction was announced to begin in September 2021. The first stretch would start operating after the second half of 2022.

On 10 June 2021, desembargador Marrey Uint, from the Court of Justice of São Paulo, suspended, through a temporary lawsuit, the prorogation of Metra's concession alleging, among other reasons, that the period would be beyond the allowed limit (total of 35 years) and the extra permission to operate the 85 lines of intermunicipal buses of the Greater ABC and the construction of the system wouldn't exempt company contract through a bidding process.
