= Ipiranga (district of São Paulo) =

District of São Paulo, Brazil

Coordinates: 23°35′29″S 46°36′28″W

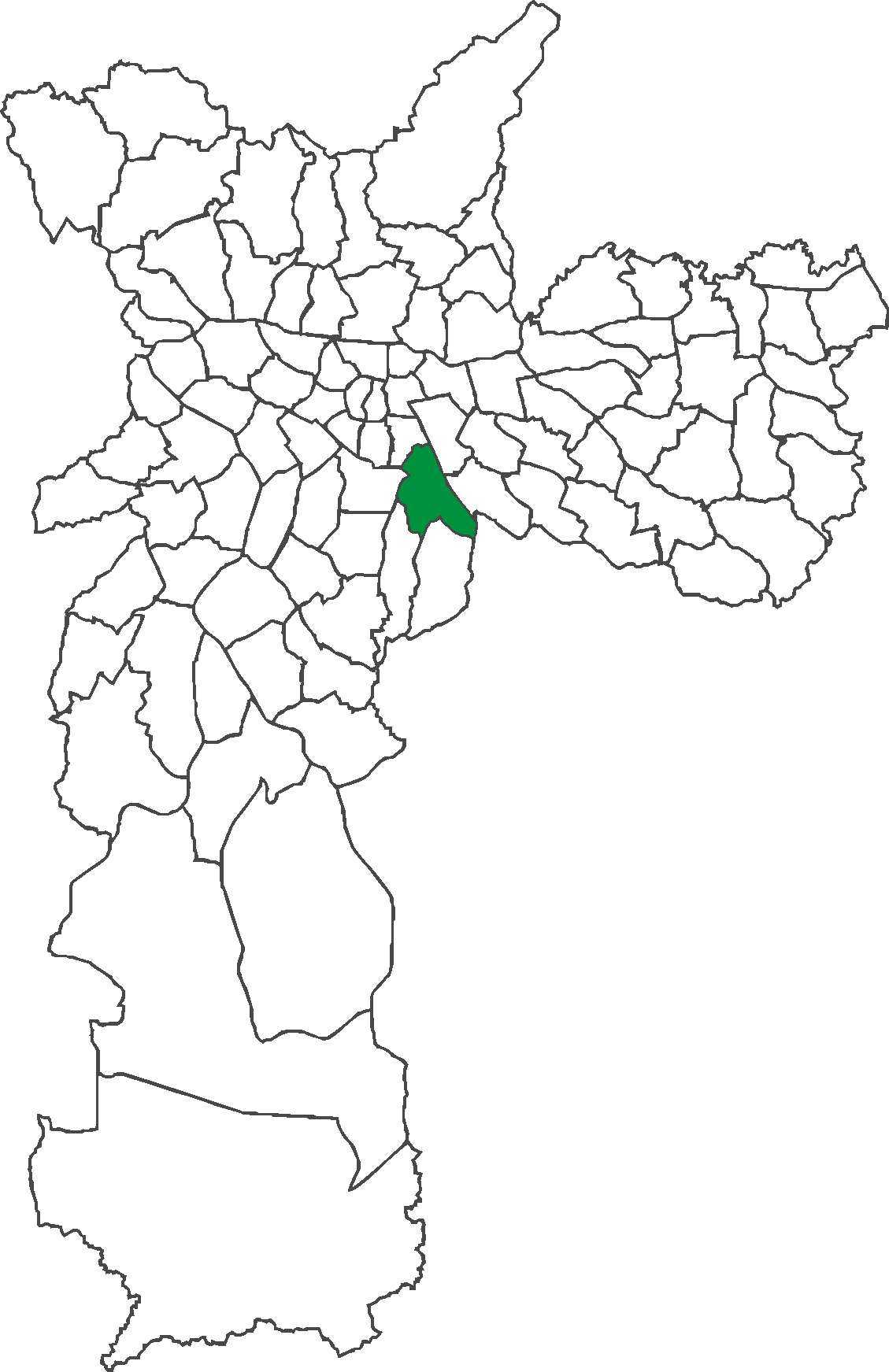
- Location in the city of São Paulo

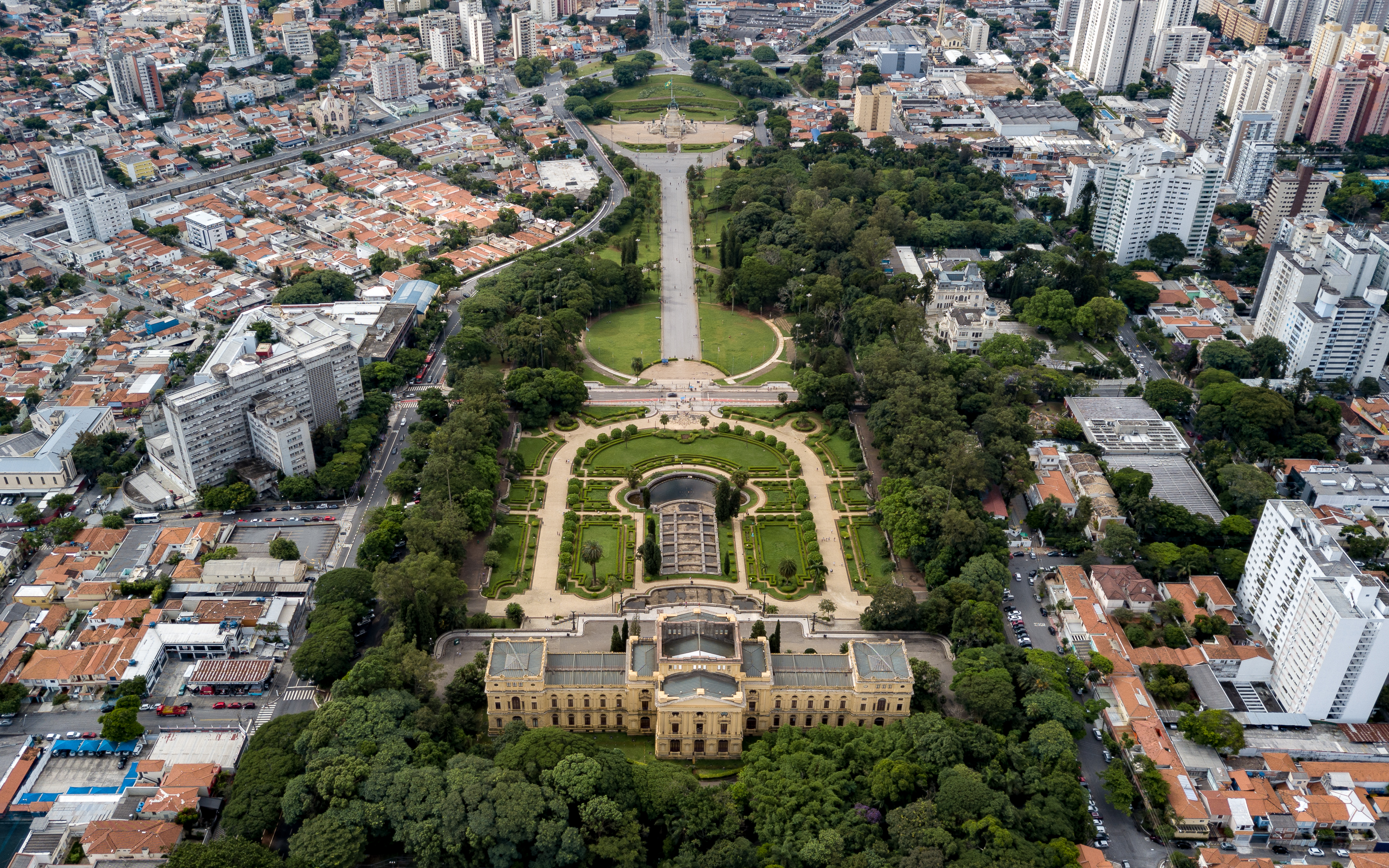
- Aerial view of Ipiranga district above Museu do Ipiranga
- Country: Brazil
- State: São Paulo
- City: São Paulo

Government
  - Type: Subprefecture
  - Subprefect: Danilo Antão Fernandes

Population (2000)
  - Total: 98.863
- HDI: 0.883 –high
- Website: Subprefecture of Ipiranga

Ipiranga (Portuguese pronunciation: [ipiˈɾɐ̃ɡɐ], from the Tupi (y, river; pirang, red) for "red river") is a historical district located in the subprefecture of the same name of São Paulo, Brazil. The name Ipiranga comes from the river (which now is a brook) of the same name located in the region, which means "red river" in a Tupí–Guaraní language. The Independence Park (Parque da Independência), where supposedly the Emperor Pedro I of Brazil proclaimed the independence of Brazil, the Paulista Museum, which exhibits classic architecture and a collection of Brazilian colonial artifacts, and the Museum of Zoology of the University of São Paulo, are also located in Ipiranga.

The Ipiranga Brook is perhaps one of the most famous Brazilian brooks, because it is mentioned in the first line of the Brazilian National Anthem.

The region near the Tamanduateí River had industrial characteristics, to the point where buses and trams heading there had the destination labeled "Factory". The area next to Nazaré Avenue, in contrast, is filled with mansions of wealthy families and a number of colleges, like Unesp and São Camilo, and workers of the factory's houses.

The commercial center of Ipiranga concentrates on Silva Bueno Street. There are banks, clothes stores and grocery stores like the famous Chocolândia.

In 2007, this neighborhood was served with the installation of a new metro whose station is named Alto do Ipiranga. It is located at Gentil de Moura Street and connects passengers with the green line of São Paulo Metro. Paulista Avenue - one of the most important avenues in São Paulo - is about 5 or 6 stations distant from Alto do Ipiranga depending on the precise destination.

Within Ipiranga, the neighborhoods of Alto do Ipiranga, Dom Pedro I, Ipiranga, Vila Carioca, Vila Eulália, Vila Independência, Vila Monumento and Vila São José are found.
