= Bilhete Único =

Transportation system

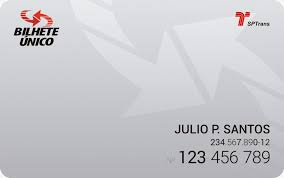
- Location: São Paulo
- Launched: 2004 for buses 2006 for rapid transit and train
- Technology: MIFARE
- Operator: Philips
- Manager: SPTrans
- Currency: BRL
- Validity: Buses; Rapid Transit; Train
- Variants: Student (50% discount); Seniors (Free / bus only) (Note: For men over 65 years and women over 60 years. Seniors must get a different card to ride the rapid transit and train for free.); Vale-transporte (Corporate use); Persons with disabilities (Free); Pregnant and obese (Note: Women from the fifth month of pregnancy and people with a BMI over 39.9. These pay a regular fare, but may exit the bus through the front door. Pregnant women enrolled in the UBS (Basic Health Unit) can get a special Mãe Paulistana card, with which they can get free rides for examinations.) E-Fácil (parking) (Note: Used for parking cars near rapid transit stations. Allows for two rides in either buses, rapid transit or train. Can also be used as a regular Bilhete Único.)
- Website: SPTrans.com.br

Bilhete Único (Unified Ticket) is the name of the São Paulo transportation contactless smart card system for fare control.

Using Philips Mifare technology, the ticketing system is managed by SPTrans (São Paulo Transporte S/A), the city bus transportation authority, which is controlled by the municipal government. Tickets were first issued using the system on May 18, 2004, when Marta Suplicy was the mayor, allowing for up to four rides in two hours by paying a single fare on buses. From 2006 it has also been used in the local rapid transit system (São Paulo Metro) and on suburban railways operated by CPTM.

== History ==
The original technical design (in about 1997) was based on Seoul's ticketing solution and provider. But the project was aborted, mostly due software problems with the complex Vale-Transporte regulation.

Around 2001/2002 the project was restarted by SPTrans under the title, Projeto de Bilhetagem Eletrônica. SPSTrans took on the role of Solution Integrator and Sponsor, choosing to have at least two providers for every supply and not to depend on a sole provider, as most other cities do.

=== Providers ===
Completion of the project resulted in the Bilhete Único, which has at least 30 different solution and service providers directly involved in the project.

The solution was a major gain solving the recharge problem: all cards are pre-paid, and recharge cannot be done on board. Other Brazilian cities failed on creating and spreading a large recharge network. Due to "win-win" agreements with Electronic Benefits Cards networks and the National Lottery network, São Paulo had over 6000 recharge points around the city by 2010.

Other software and hardware solution providers are: portals and back-office.

- Microsoft: Windows desktops on all parts. Windows servers, Biztalk and MS-SQL on EDI from garages.
- Oracle: Provides the central SQL database and data warehouse.
- IBM: Provides RISC servers and AIX on central processors.

== Fares and regulations ==
As of 1 January 2024, regular Bilhete Único users pay R$ 4.40 for up to four bus rides in a three-hour period. Boarding the rapid transit system or a train costs R$ 5.00. An integration between the systems allows for up to three bus rides and either a rapid transit or train ride in a three-hour period for R$ 8.20, provided that the user boards the rapid transit or train in the first two hours. Students and teachers pay half price, while persons with disabilities and seniors have free access.
