= SPTrans =

São Paulo Transporte
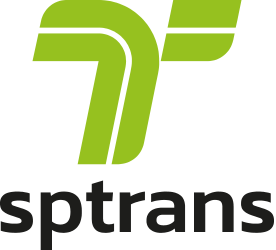

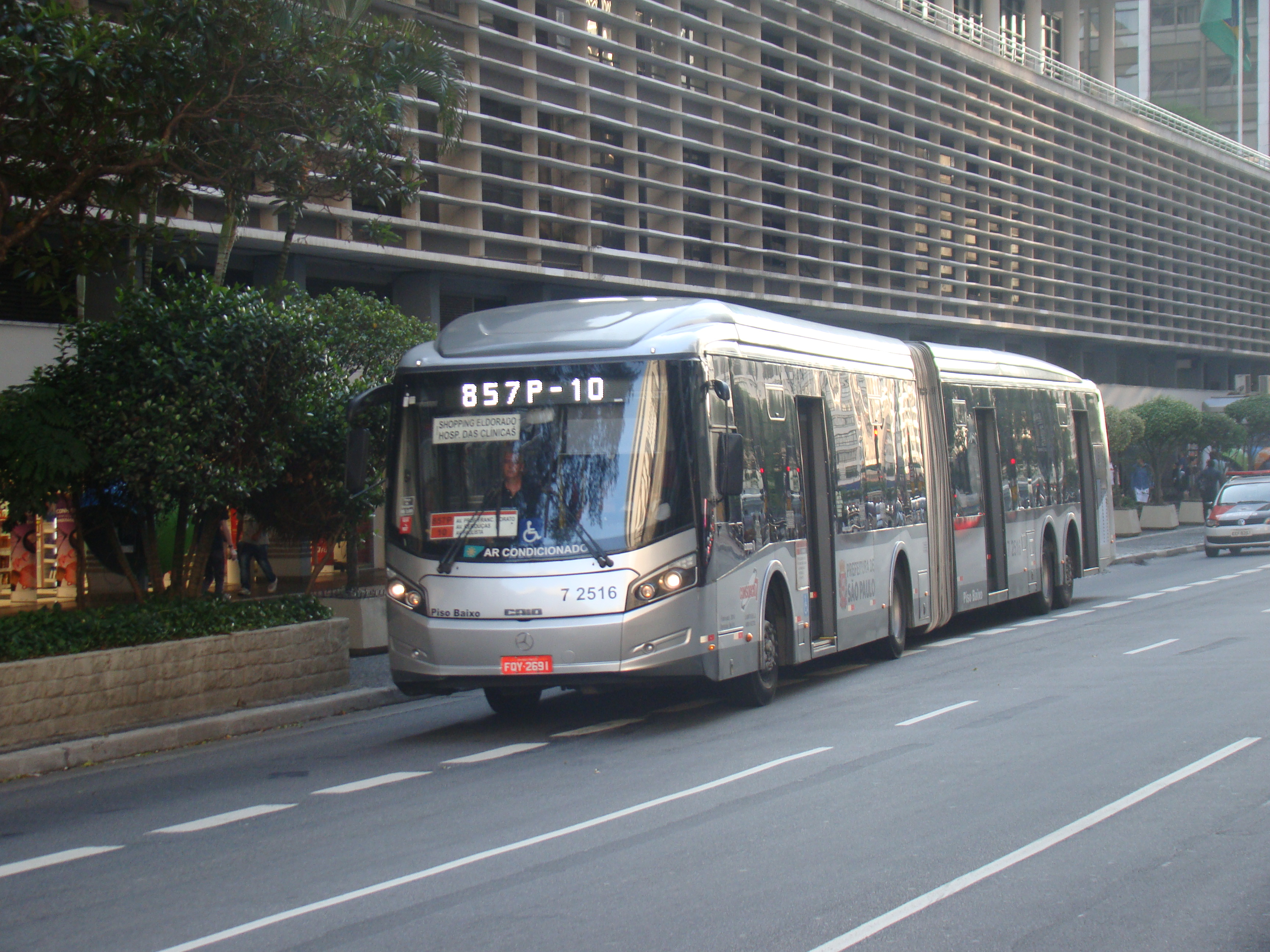

Overview
- Owner: São Paulo Municipality
- Area served: São Paulo, Brazil
- Transit type: Bus rapid transit; Transit bus; Trolleybus
- Chief executive: Victor Hugo Borges
- Headquarters: R. Boa Vista, 236; Centro; São Paulo, SP
- Website: www.sptrans.com.br

Operation
- Began operation: 8 March 1995

São Paulo Transporte (SPTrans) (English: São Paulo Transport), is the name adopted on March 8, 1995 by the municipal local government which aims to manage the public transport system with buses in São Paulo. Until 1995, it was known as Companhia Municipal de Transportes Coletivos, which, when translated from Portuguese to English, it is the Municipal Public Transport Company. All bus lines are operated by concessionaires under the supervision of SPTrans, providing business planning and management of public transport. The SPTrans issues work orders for each line of operation, including setting paths, hours of operation, and necessary fleet. The fare can be made in cash or by contactless smart card called Bilhete Único. The company also manages the bus lanes and bus terminals in the city.

== Bus routes ==
Bus routes managed by SPTrans have four digits or three digits plus one letter according to the service type, and a two-digit extension number, which is 10 by default.

=== Regional and radial routes ===
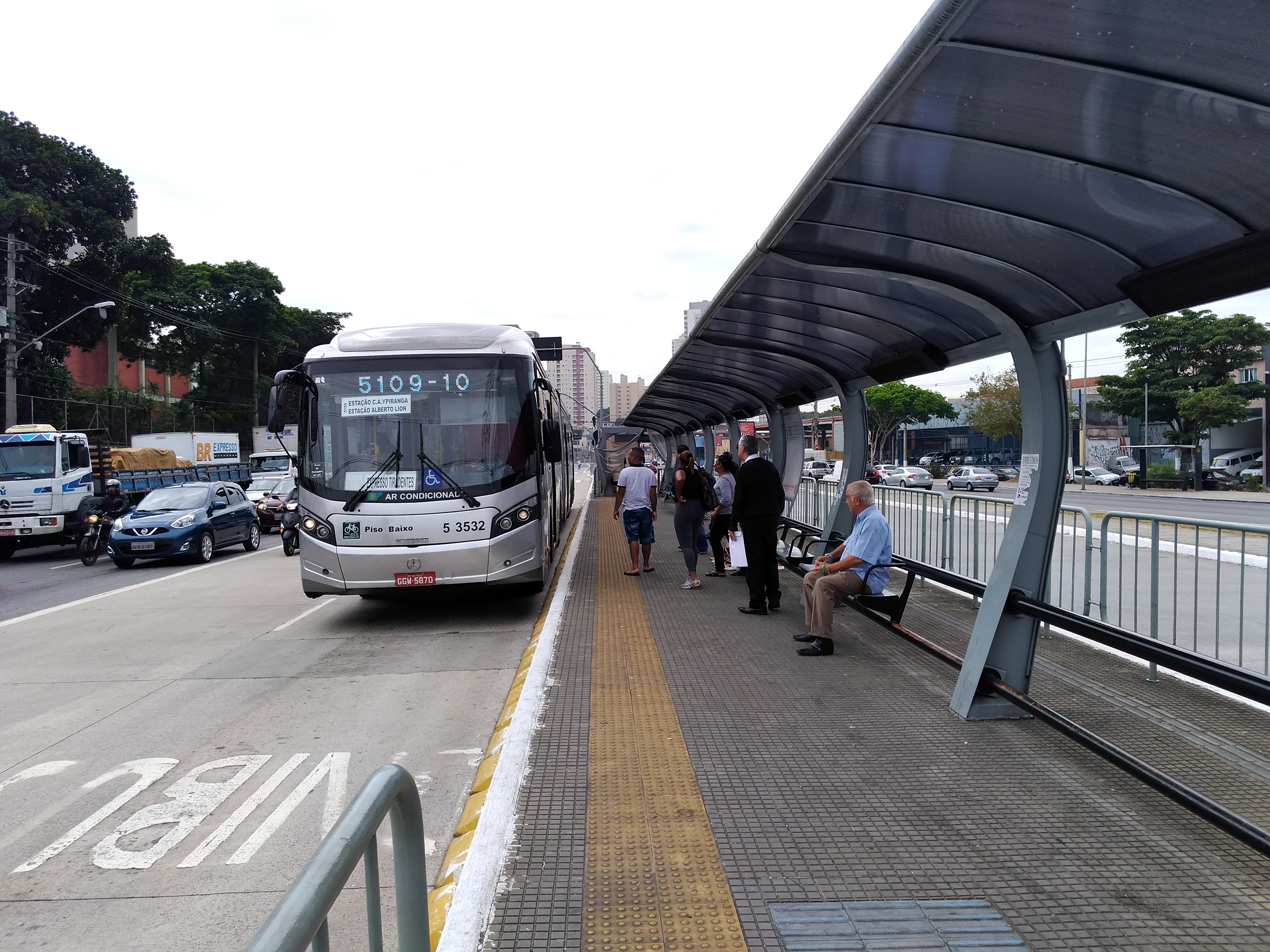
An example of an SPTrans radial bus route: 5109-10, where first digit 5 = Southeast, second digit 1 = radial route, third and fourth digits 09 = serial number, and last two digits 10 = extension number (separated by a dash)

Regional and radial bus routes within São Paulo are composed of four numerical digits in the range 0, 1, 2 ... 9. The first digit indicates the origin of the route according to the set area. The second digit is a 0 for a regional route or between 1 and 6 for a radial route, which indicates that the route separates from the main avenue of the region. The rightmost two digits serve as a serial number.

=== Inter-regional and diametrical routes ===
Inter-regional and diametrical bus routes within São Paulo are composed of three numerical digits and an alphabetic digit in the range A ... Z. The first two digits have the same values as the regional and radial routes. The third digit indicates the region where the route ends. The fourth digit, a letter, indicates the route taken to the destination.

=== Two-digit extension number ===
Following the four digits is the two digits that serve as the extension number.

- 10 — The default extension number.
- 11 — The number used to indicate a night service.
- 21 to 29 — Extension numbers within this group operate only on part of the baseline stretch, either from mid-to-end or start to mid-way, typically used at rush hours.
- 31 to 39 — Extension numbers within this group indicate that this route's terminals typically correspond to the route that has the extension number of 10, but diverges mid-way.
- 41 to 49 — Extension numbers within this group travel part of the base path but forks after a certain point, having its starting or ending point different from the route that has the extension number of 10.
- 51 to 59 — Extension numbers within this group go beyond the route's start or end terminals that correspond to the route that has the extension number of 10.

=== History ===
The current four-digit bus route numbering system SPTrans uses today, where the last digit is an alphanumerical digit, was established in 1976, but was not fully implemented due to citywide changes that were carried out according to the development, and the management change within the São Paulo's city hall.

During Marta Suplicy's administration, between 2001 and 2004, the city was again divided into nine operational bus areas citywide, only this time from 1 to 9 and there were some changes.

For example, the Santana region, in the northern zone of São Paulo, which until then was area 1, is now classified as area 2, but most of the lines that pass through the Santana region are still numbered where the first digit is 1.

In 2003, when the Pirituba terminal (which is in area 1) was created, new lines were implemented, where the first digit is an 8 or a 9. The last digit is an alphanumeric digit.

== Division of companies by area ==
This map shows the division of company lots by area.

The current model of municipal public transport in São Paulo divides the city into nine different areas, and for eight of them (1 - Northwest, 2 - North, 3 - Northeast, 4 - East, 5 - Southeast, 6 - South, 7 - Southwest and 8 - West) lots were established for the distribution of companies and cooperatives that will provide transport services by buses, minibuses, vans and trolleybuses. Area 9 is in the Central Zone of São Paulo, which encompasses the entire expanded centre of São Paulo, which does not have specific lots, so there is no company that operates specifically within these limits. The lines that operate only within the limits of area 9 are the responsibility of companies in areas 1 to 8, normally, the one closest to the point considered as the beginning of the line (a rule that has several exceptions).

=== Contractors ===
- Area 1 - Northwest - Light Green: Santa Brígida, Gato Preto, Norte Buss, D1 Transportes.
- Area 2 - North - Dark Blue: Sambaíba, Norte Buss, Spencer.
- Area 3 - Northeast - Yellow: Metrópole Paulista, Transunião, Alfa RodoBus.
- Area 4 - East - Red: Ambiental, AlliBus, Pêssego, Express.
- Area 5 - Southeast - Dark Green: Via Sudeste, Transunião, Move Buss.
- Area 6 - South - Blue: Viação Grajaú, Mobibrasil, Transwolff, A2 Transportes.
- Area 7 - Southwest - Dark Red: Campo Belo, Metrópole Paulista, Gatusa, Nova Paineira, KBPX, Transwolff.
- Area 8 - West - Orange: Transppass, Gato Preto, Auto Bless, Alfa RodoBus.
- Since 2020, Auto Bless has used the color Dark Red, but is part of Area 8. This is because in the 2019 bid, some important neighborhoods where it operates were transferred from Area 8 – Orange to Area 7 – Dark Red. Previously, the company normally used the color orange. There are no plans to change prefixes and definitive integration for Area 7.
- Area 9 - Central - Grey: No specific company, served by all.

== See also ==
- São Paulo Metro
- Companhia Paulista de Trens Metropolitanos - São Paulo's Metropolitan Train Company
- Empresa Metropolitana de Transportes Urbanos de São Paulo
- Trolleybuses in São Paulo
