= Vila Madalena (São Paulo Metro) =

Metro station in Sao Paulo, Brazil

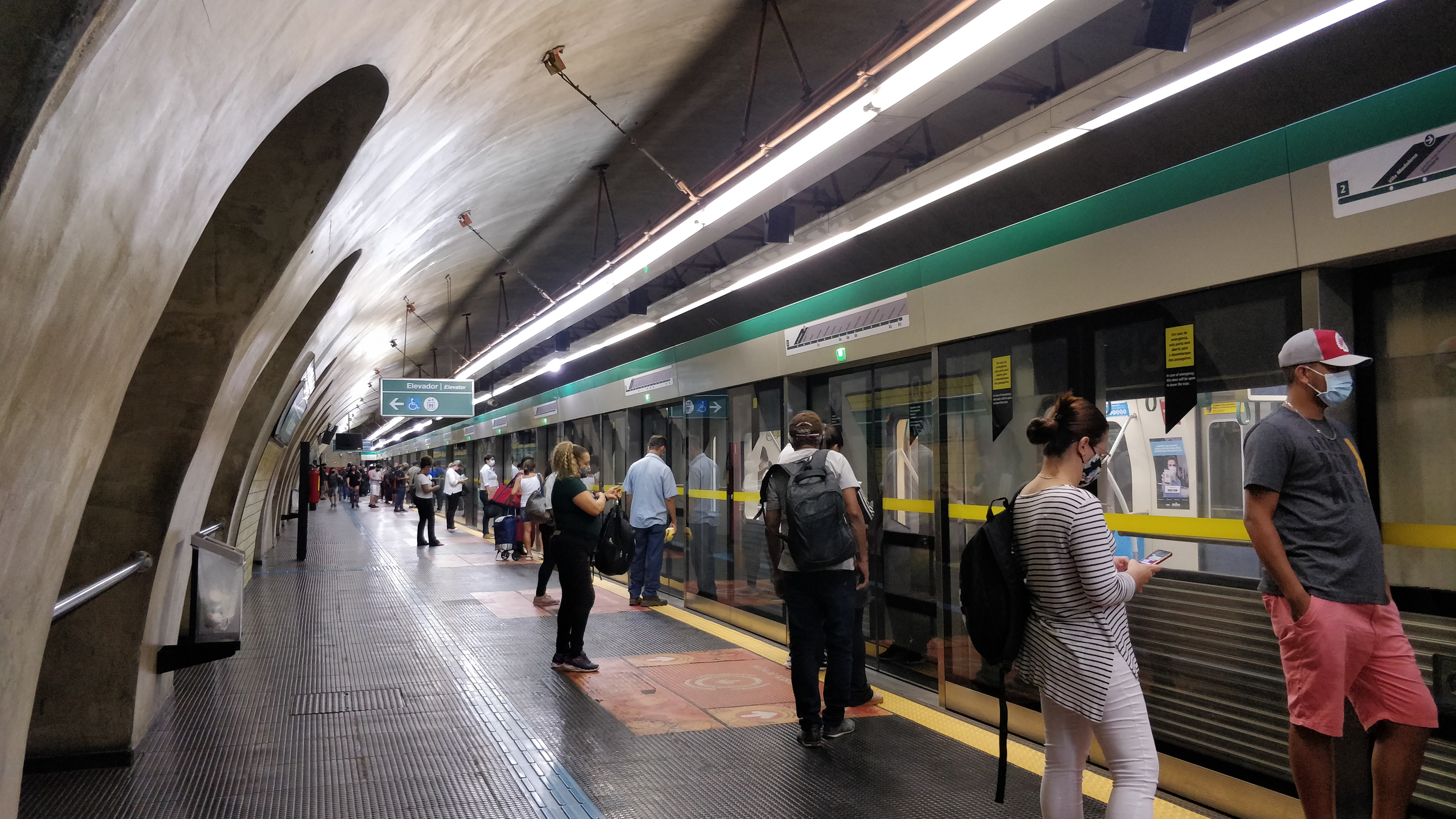
- Vila Madalena Station

General information
- Location: Pça. Américo Jacomino, 30, Pinheiros; São Paulo; Brazil
- Coordinates: 23°32′47″S 46°41′27″W
- Owner: Government of the State of São Paulo
- Operator: Companhia do Metropolitano de São Paulo
- Platforms: Side platforms
- Connections: Vila Madalena Bus Terminal; Cidade Universitária (2000–2011) (Note: Until 2011, the Orca Shuttle Service connected Vila Madalena station and CPTM station Cidade Universitária.)

Construction
- Structure type: Underground
- Accessible: Y
- Architect: João Toscano, Massayoshi Kamimura, Odiléia Toscano

Other information
- Station code: VMD

History
- Opened: November 21, 1998; 27 years ago

Passengers
- 18,000/business day

Services
| Preceding station | São Paulo Metro | Following station |
|---|---|---|
| Terminus | Line 2 | Santuário Nossa Senhora de Fátima-Sumaré towards Penha |
Track layout
Location

Vila Madalena is a station on Line 2 (Green) of the São Paulo Metro and as of August 2026 is the current terminus.

== Station layout ==
| G | Street level | Exit/entrance |
| M | Mezzanine | Fare control, ticket office, customer service, Bilhete Único/BOM recharge machines |
| P Platform level | Side platform, doors open on the right |
| P Platform level | Southbound | toward Vila Prudente → |
| P Platform level | Southbound | toward Vila Prudente → |
| P Platform level | Side platform, doors open on the left |

== SPTrans lines ==
The following SPTrans bus lines can be accessed. Passengers may use a Bilhete Único card for transfer:

| Line | Destination |
|---|---|
| N208/11 | Term. Casa Verde |
| 701A/10 | Parque Edu Chaves |
| 7725/10 | Rio Pequeno |
| 7725/21 | USP (Semi- Express) |
| 8047/41 | Jaraguá |
| N838/11 | CPTM Leopoldina |

== EMTU lines ==
The following EMTU bus lines can be accessed:

| Line | Destination |
|---|---|
| 138 | OSASCO (Munhóz Júnior) |
| | PONTE ORCA Cidade Universitária Station |
