= Penha (São Paulo Metro) =

São Paulo Metro station

Penha–Lojas Besni
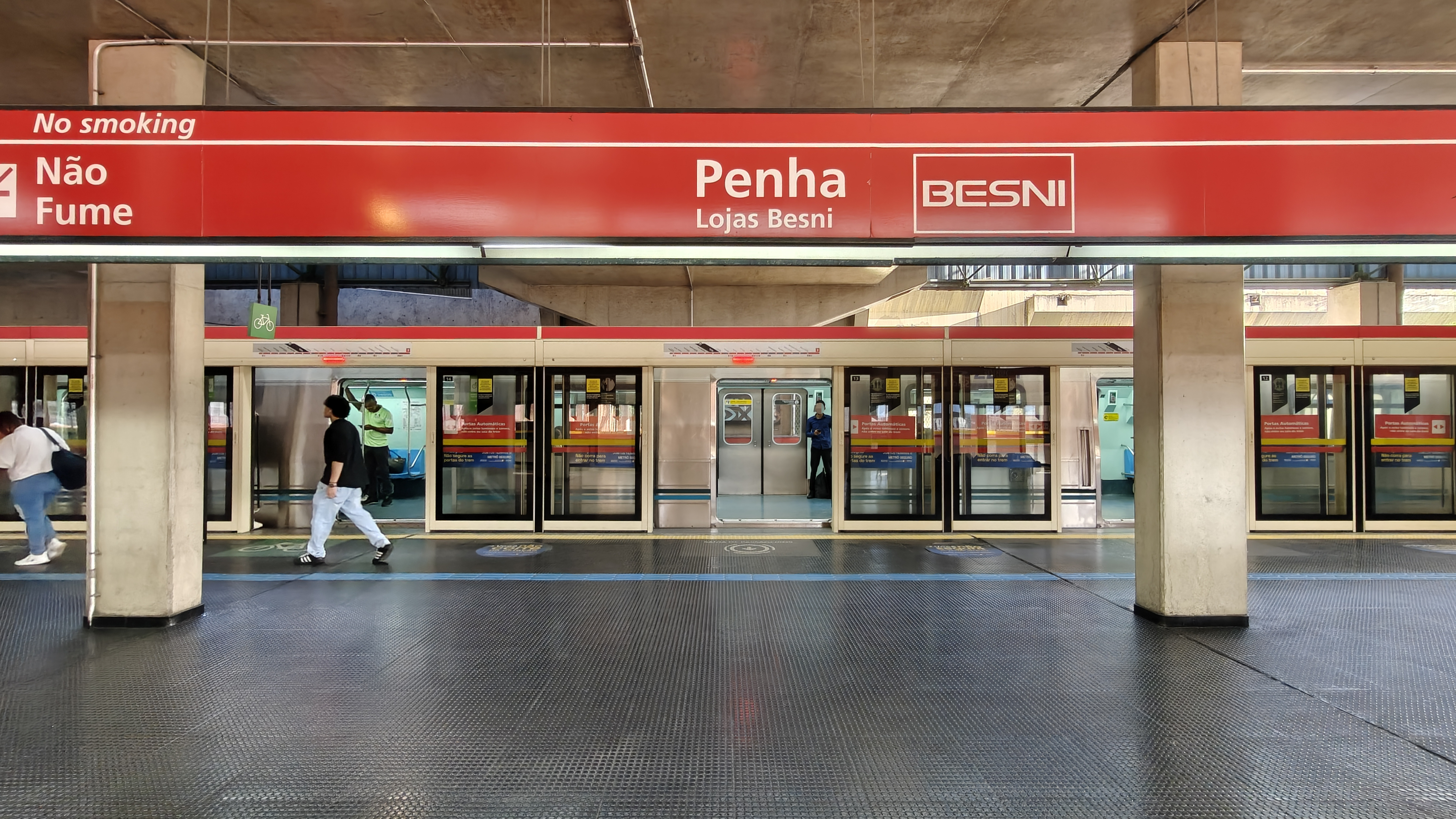

General information
- Location: São Paulo; Brazil
- Coordinates: 23°32′00″S 46°32′32″W
- Owner: Government of the State of São Paulo
- Operator: Companhia do Metropolitano de São Paulo; CPTM
- Platforms: Side platforms (under construction); Island platform Island platform (under construction)
- Connections: North Penha Bus Terminal; South Penha Bus Terminal

Construction
- Structure type: Underground; At-grade; At-grade

Other information
- Station code: PEN

History
- Opened: March 31, 1986; 40 years ago
- Opening: 2026; 0 years ago (estimated); 2027; 1 year's time (estimated)
- Former names: Aricanduva

Passengers
- 28,000/business day

Services
Preceding station	São Paulo Metro	Following station
Aricanduva towards Vila Madalena	Line 2	Terminus
Carrão towards Palmeiras–Barra Funda	Line 3	Vila Matilde towards Corinthians-Itaquera
Future out-of-system interchange
Preceding station	São Paulo Metropolitan Trains	Following station
Tatuapé towards Palmeiras-Barra Funda	Line 11	Corinthians-Itaquera towards Estudantes
Track layout
Upper level (Line 3)
Lower level (Line 2)
Location

Penha, also known as Penha–Lojas Besni for sponsorship reasons, is a station on Line 3 (Red) of the São Paulo Metro. The station was renamed after the purchase of the naming right by the shoes and sneakers store network Lojas Besni.

== SPTrans Lines ==
The following SPTrans bus lines can be accessed. Passengers may use a Bilhete Único card for transfer:

Line
242P/10
2713/10
2716/10
2718/10
2726/10
2728/10
2729/10
273J/10
273V/10
2755/10
2764/10
2768/10
2772/10
3702/10
3722/10
3781/10
3793/10
3901/10
