= Bombing of São Paulo =

Event of São Paulo Revolt of 1924

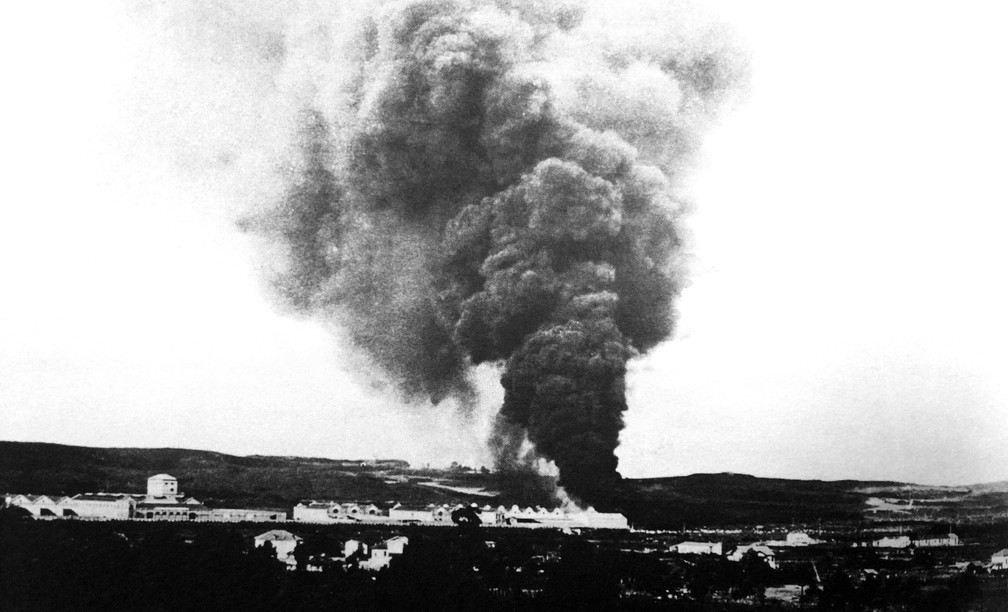
A fire at the Nazareth Teixeira & Cia warehouses, in Mooca, as a result of the bombing

The bombing of São Paulo, which took place during the São Paulo Revolt of 1924, was the largest artillery and air attack in São Paulo's history. From 5 to 28 July 1924, rebel and loyalist forces used bombing in their fight for the city; the rebels had up to 26 artillery pieces from the Brazilian Army, while the loyalists had more than a hundred guns and six bombers from the Army Aviation. Artillery, and especially loyalist artillery, was largely responsible for the conflict's casualties, most of whom were civilians.

The rebels had the artillery advantage in the early days and had been firing since the morning of 5 July. From positions such as Campo de Marte and Cemitério do Araçá, they aimed their 75 and 105 mm Krupp cannons at the Campos Elíseos Palace, headquarters of governor Carlos de Campos, the headquarters of the 4th Battalion of the Public Force of São Paulo, and other loyalist targets. Mistakes in aim cost the lives of several civilians, but the pressure on the governor contributed to the withdrawal of loyalist troops to the outskirts of the city on 8 July. General Eduardo Sócrates' loyalist division received continuous reinforcements, gaining a strong advantage in artillery, with more recent designs from Schneider and Saint Chamond, including the conflict's most powerful 155 mm artillery.

On the sides of Penha and Ipiranga, the divisional artillery launched intense attacks beginning on 11 July, targeting mainly the working-class neighborhoods in the south and east of the city, such as Brás, Belenzinho and Mooca, where the loyalist troops were trying to advance. Loyalist bombardment destroyed some defensive strongholds, such as factories, but was generally ineffective; loyalist general Abílio de Noronha criticized the bombardment in technical terms as a haphazard attack, without regulation and correction of fire, destroying mainly civilian targets. The population was terrorized, hiding in cellars and leaving the city by the hundreds of thousands. Foreign diplomatic representatives and São Paulo's economic elite, harmed by the chaos in the city, tried to negotiate an interruption in the bombings, but the government did not give in. The bombing had the full endorsement of president Artur Bernardes and governor Carlos de Campos, who was the author of the expression: "São Paulo would rather see its beautiful capital destroyed than legality in Brazil destroyed".

1,800 buildings were damaged in the conflict, among which the Theatro Olympia, the Glória Church, the Cotonifício (Cotton Factory) Crespi, and the Duchen Biscuits Factory are emblematic. The bombing was very controversial at the time and has a negative impact on the image of Artur Bernardes in historiography. The brutality of the bombing is compared to previous conflicts in Brazil like the War of Canudos, and the government is accused of deliberately attacking civilians in a "terrorizing bombing", either as punishment for the population of working-class neighborhoods or as pressure to force the rebels to withdraw – which they did on 27 July. The legality of the bombing has been contested since 1924, as international law at the time already condemned the bombing of a city without regard for civilian lives, which could constitute a war crime.

== Background ==
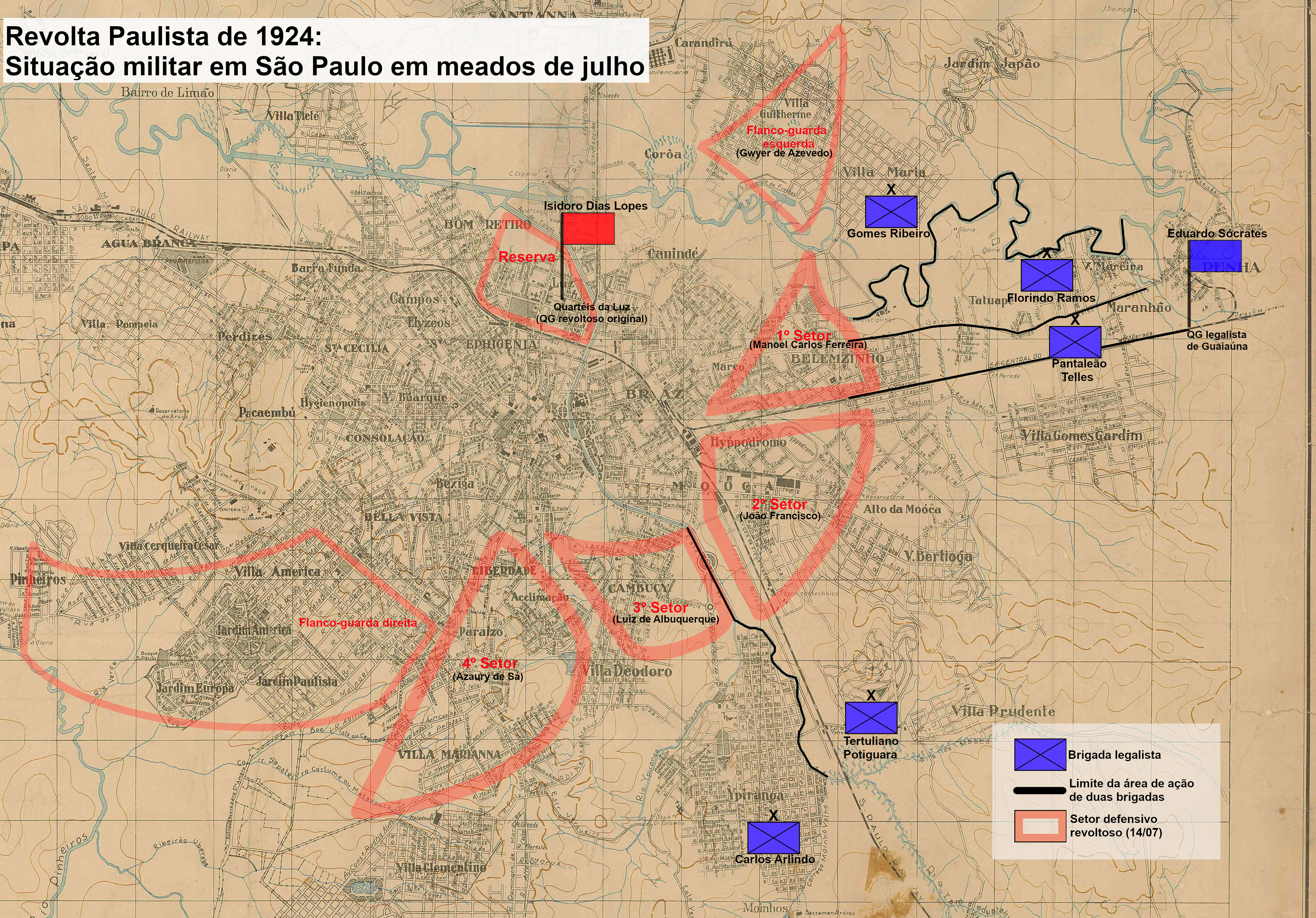
Rebel (red) and loyalist (blue) positions on the outskirts of the city in mid July

On 5 July 1924, lieutenant revolutionaries of the Brazilian Army and the Public Force of São Paulo, led by retired general Isidoro Dias Lopes, started a military uprising in São Paulo, planning a rapid takeover of the city to then advance towards Rio de Janeiro and depose president Artur Bernardes. The rebels did not gain all the expected troop support and soon found themselves locked in urban combat against loyalist forces. The first days of fighting were concentrated in Campos Elíseos, Luz and in the historic center. The loyalists retreated to the outskirts of the city on 8 July, grouping in the directions of Santos and Rio de Janeiro, with the seat of the state government being transferred to the Guaiaúna railway station, in Penha.

Against 3 to 3,500 rebels, the federal government brought reinforcements from other states, forming a loyalist army of 14–15,000 men, armed with the most modern equipment available in the country, with which the reconquest of the city began. The crossfire took place in the working-class neighborhoods. The loyalists reoccupied the city on 28 July, after an overnight evacuation by the rebels, who seized the railroads on their way to the Paraná River, prolonging the revolt inland.

=== Weapons used ===
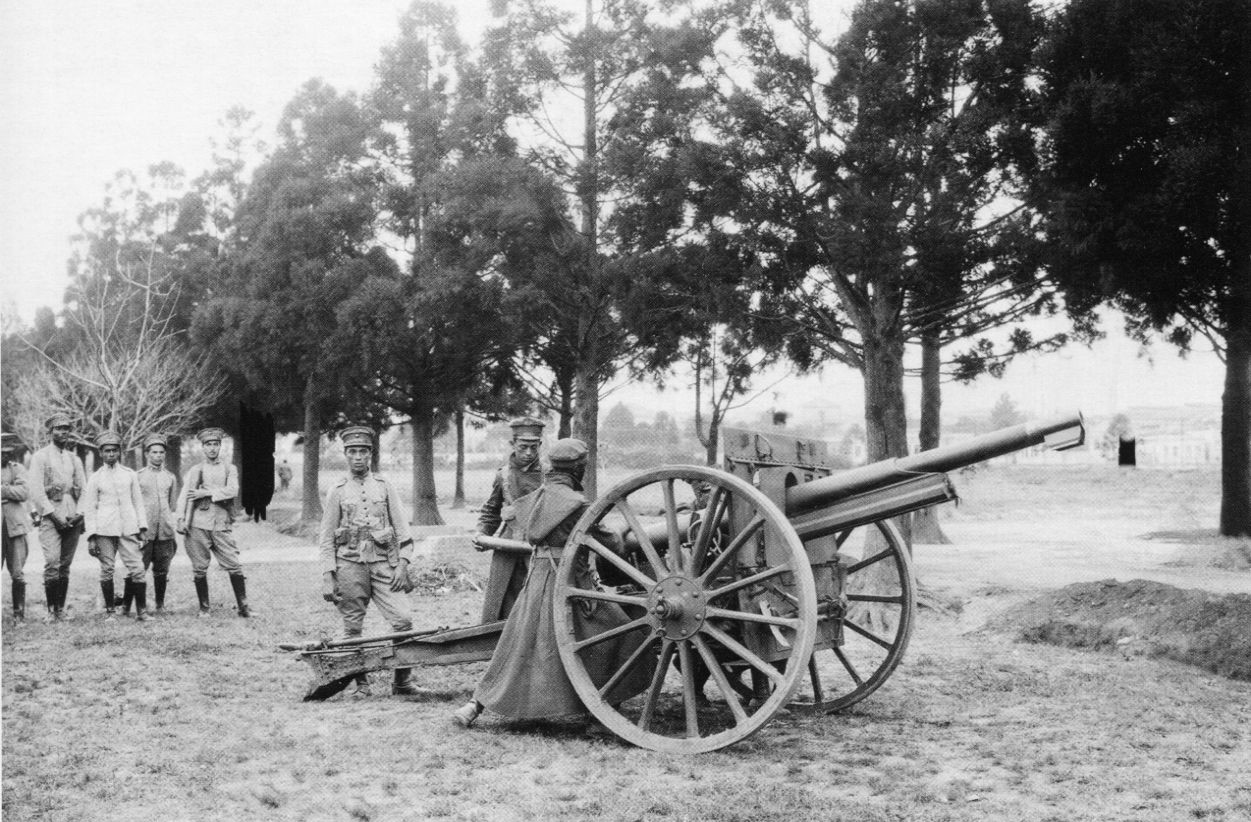
Loyalist 75 mm cannon

Several types of army artillery were used in the combats in São Paulo, with 75, 105 and 155 millimeters caliber guns. Most of the pieces dated from the beginning of the century; the most modern ones were bought after the First World War, under the influence of the French Military Mission. The guns were transported by animal traction; it was not until the 1930s that the Brazilian Army began to use motorized transport for its guns.

The 75mm Krupp artillery existed in two models of field guns (C/28, 1905 model, and C/28, 1908 model), one of mountain guns (C/14, model 1906), and one of howitzers (C /14, 1906 model). The 1908 field cannon fired seven-kilogram shell, of the high-explosive type, for the destruction of houses, and shrapnel, for anti personnel. Its range was 6.8 kilometers. The mountain cannon was similar, but could be broken down into bales for transport on the back of mules. Its ammunition was the same, but with a smaller case and protective charge. It had a range of three kilometers and poorer aim. The army also had 75mm C/36 1920 Model field guns from Saint-Chamond and C/18.6 1919 Model mountain guns from Schneider.

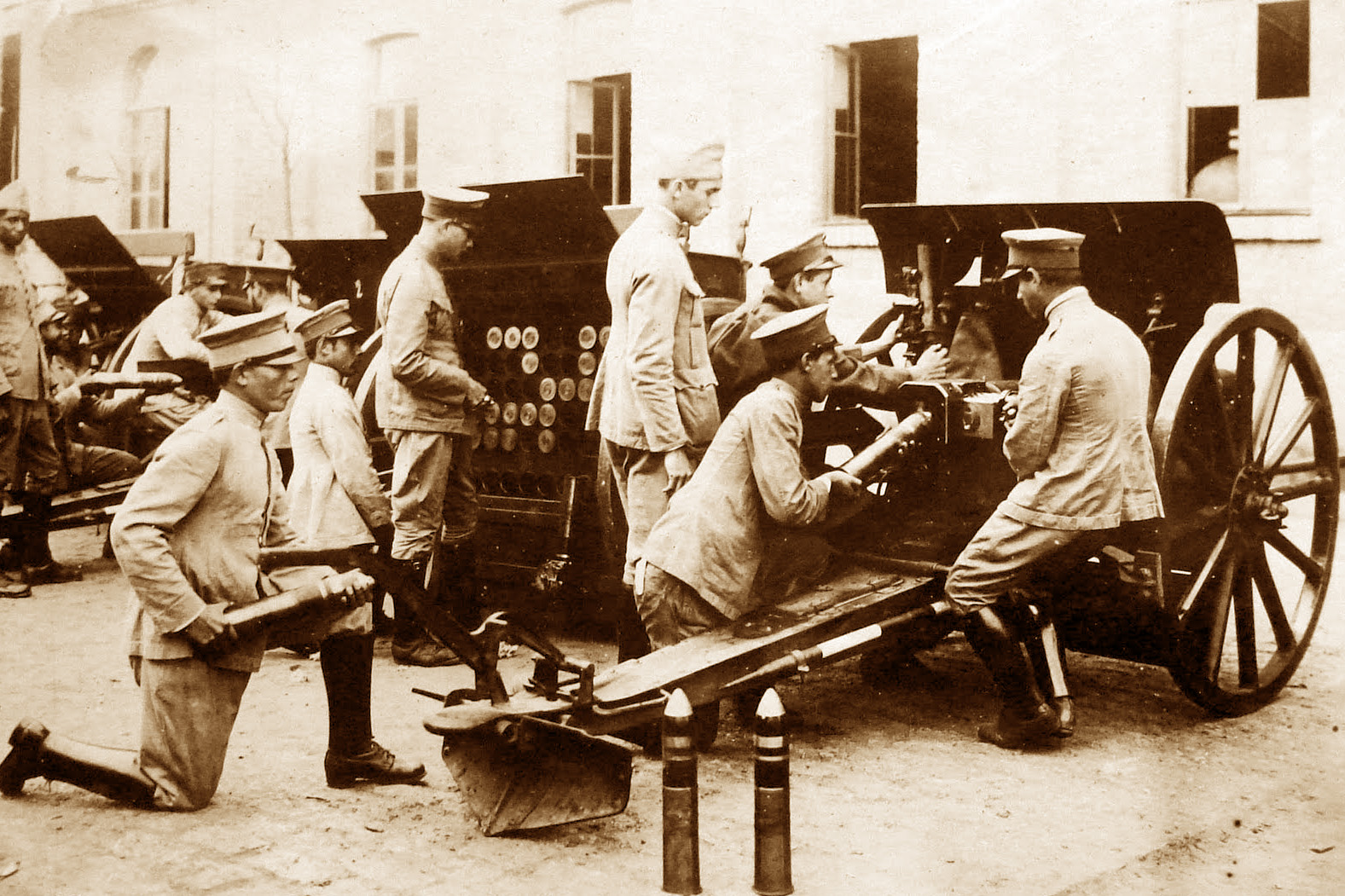
Loading of a 75mm Krupp battery

105mm Krupp guns from 1910 fired fifteen kilogram shells in direct and indirect fire up to four miles away. Each shell could damage structures or, due to shrapnel, kill people within 400 meters of the hit point. The army's most powerful artillery pieces were the 155 mm howitzers, 1917 model, by Schneider, whose shots had a range of up to eleven kilometers, and could kill a person within a 600-meter radius from the hit point.

The army's infantry had guns of lesser firepower to directly accompany their attacks: Stokes mortars and 37mm Puteaux revolver-cannons. The 37 mm guns had an effective range of 1,500 meters. The Brazilian Navy also contributed 16 small-caliber rapid-fire cannons, installed in railway wagons at the Companhia Docas de Santos' workshops. They were 38mm Nordenfelt, 47mm Armstrong, and 57mm Nordenfelt models, taken from the Naval Academy and navy battleships. This railway artillery was used to attack Mooca through the tracks of the São Paulo Railway Company.

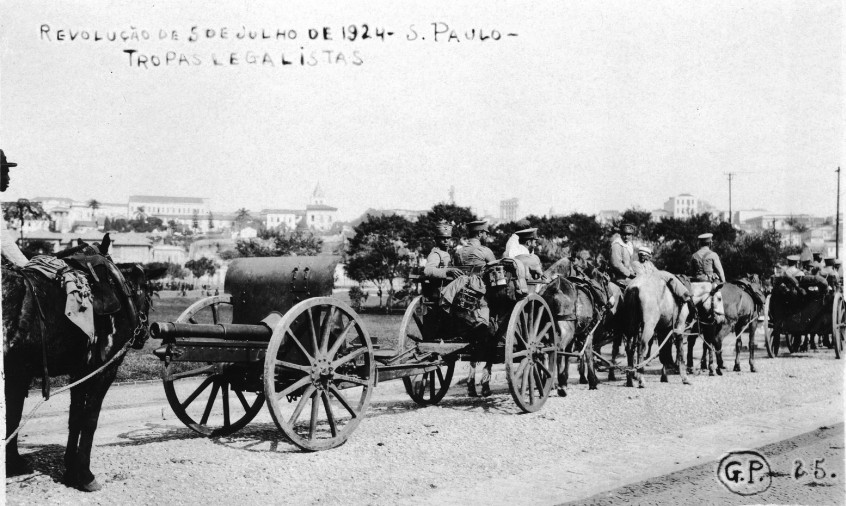
Transport of guns

The rebels' greatest firepower consisted of twenty 75 mm and six 105 mm guns, all from Krupp. The first loyalist artillery arrived on 7 July: two 75mm Armstrong guns from the navy and two 75 mm Krupp guns from the army. These pieces' range was inferior to that of the rebel artillery, which managed to fire against the loyalist pieces. Throughout the month, the loyalist artillery was reinforced and achieved qualitative and quantitative superiority, with Schneider and Saint Chamond guns of up to 155mm. The heavy and outdated cannons in the hands of the rebels did not have the range to reach the more than 100 loyalist guns, well positioned in the hills on the outskirts of the city.

Both sides employed military aviation, but the rebels' only bombing mission was an unsuccessful attempt on the Catete Palace in Rio de Janeiro. The loyalists had six Breguet 14A2/B2 bombers from Army Aviation. They dropped over a hundred small grenades and at least three 75-kilogram bombs on the city.

=== Hierarchical responsibility ===
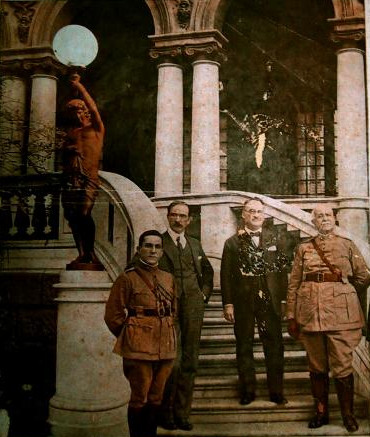
Eduardo Sócrates and Carlos de Campos, respectively the first and second from right to left

The artillery units present in the state of São Paulo in July 1924, in the 2nd Military Region, were the 2nd Independent Group of Heavy Artillery (GIAP), in Quitaúna, Osasco; the 2nd Mountain Artillery Group (GAM), in Jundiaí; the 4th Horse Artillery Regiment (RAM), in Itu; and the 3rd Coastal Artillery Group, at the Itaipu Fort, Praia Grande. All of these units, plus several groups and regiments from other military regions, took part on one side or the other in the revolt.

Lieutenant Custódio de Oliveira, from the 2nd GIAP, was instrumental in the lieutenant conspiracy and subsequent revolt. The outbreak of the revolt depended on his battery, whose position to be occupied in the city was defined months in advance. Oliveira moved his battery at dawn, simulating an exercise, and, with some delay, was already positioned in the capital of São Paulo in the morning. The 2nd GAM, belonging to lieutenant colonel Olinto de Mesquita Vasconcelos, came to São Paulo to join the revolt the following day. After the withdrawal of the state government, the 4th RAM, under captain Clístenes Barbosa, did the same.

Loyalist artillery units formed part of the Division of Operations in the State of São Paulo, commanded by general Eduardo Sócrates, in which they formed part of one of its infantry brigades or served as divisional troops. Its order of battle was published shortly after the revolt by writers Ciro Costa and Eurico de Góis, based on official notes from the military commands, and by general Abílio de Noronha, commander of the 2nd Military Region at the start of the revolt. The two listings have some differences:

Loyalist artillery units in São Paulo
Noronha 1924, pp. 128–131	Costa & Góis 1924, pp. 125–129
Divisional troops: 1st Heavy Artillery Group (one battery of 155 mm and another of 105 mm guns) (Note: Presence of the 2nd Battery, with 155mm guns, attested by Parreira 2019, p. 20. Costa & Góis 1924, p. 127, mentions a "heavy group", commanded by lieutenant colonel Garcez and consisting of a 105mm battery, of Captain Luiz Gonzaga Fernandes, and another of 155mm of captain Luiz Correia Lima.); 6th Mounted Artillery Regiment; 5th Mountain Artillery Group (Note: Costa & Góis 1924, p. 128 mention a "mountain group of 75", with two batteries commanded by captains Antônio Fernandes Leal and Jorge Antônio Sounis. The presence of Antônio Fernandes Leal is attested in the press in March 1924.); 3rd Heavy Artillery Group (one battery); In colonel João Gomes Ribeiro's brigade: 75mm battery of the 9th Mounted Artillery Regiment; In general Carlos Arlindo's brigade: 3rd Coastal Artillery Group (one battery); Navy's force, including its artillery	Divisional Artillery Brigade (General João José de Lima): 8th Mounted Artillery Regiment (Colonel Crisanto Leite de Miranda Sá Júnior); 2nd Group of the 1st Mounted Artillery Regiment (Major Mascarenhas de Morais) (Note: Presence attested in the entry of Dicionário Histórico-Biográfico Brasileiro about the commander.); 2nd Heavy Artillery Regiment (Lieutenant Colonel Alfredo Assunção) (Note: According to Catálogo de destino dos acervos das Organizações Militares do Exército Brasileiro, p. 108, this unit, based in Jundiaí, had become the 2nd GIAP on 8 March 1924. The 2nd GIAP participated in the uprising, but with only one battery; other rebel units participated only in part, while other parts were in the loyalist contingent, as the 4th Hunter Battalion(Noronha 1924, pp. 126, 129). Presence of Lieutenant Colonel Alfredo Assunção in this unit is attested in the press in February 1924.); 3rd Battery of the 9th Mounted Artillery Regiment(Captain Reis Júnior) (Note: The same authors also include this battery and its commander within the João Gomes Ribeiro detachment.); In general Carlos Arlindo's brigade: 3rd Independent Heavy Artillery Group (Captain Argemiro Dornellas); 1st Horse Artillery Group(Lieutenant Colonel Bento Marinho Alves); 9th Battery of the 6th Mounted Artillery Regiment(Captain Pedro Duro)

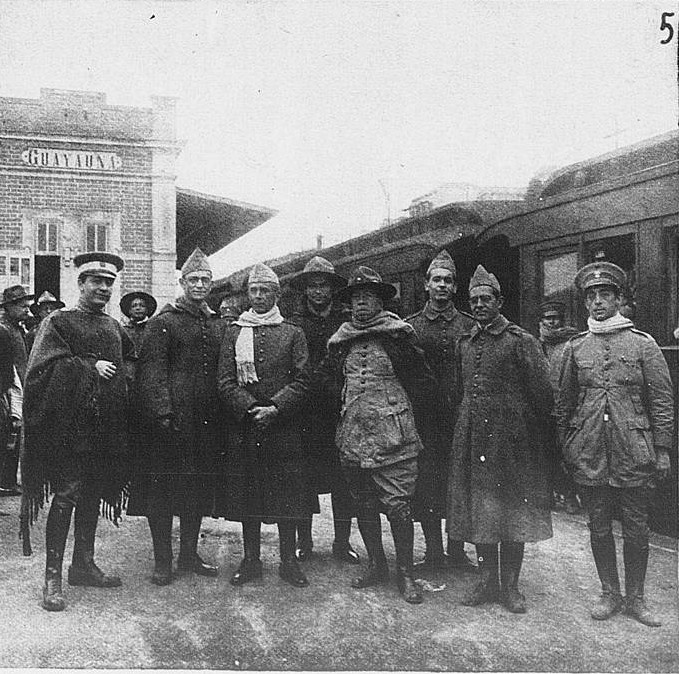
General Staff of the loyalist Divisional Artillery

The loyalist bombers came from the Aviation School of Campo dos Afonsos, in Rio de Janeiro, whose commander, lieutenant colonel Álvaro Octávio de Alencastre, served as Director of Aeronautics in operations against the revolt. The commander of the pilots and aerial observers was captain Marcos Evangelista da Costa Villela Júnior.

The effective command of the army was disputed between the Chief of Staff of the Army and the Minister of War, both, in practice, appointed by the president of Brazil. The bombing was carried out with the approval of Minister of War Setembrino de Carvalho and president Artur Bernardes. Thus, the responsibility fell to the federal government. The state government of Carlos de Campos supported the president's decision.

== Bombed areas ==
=== By the rebels ===
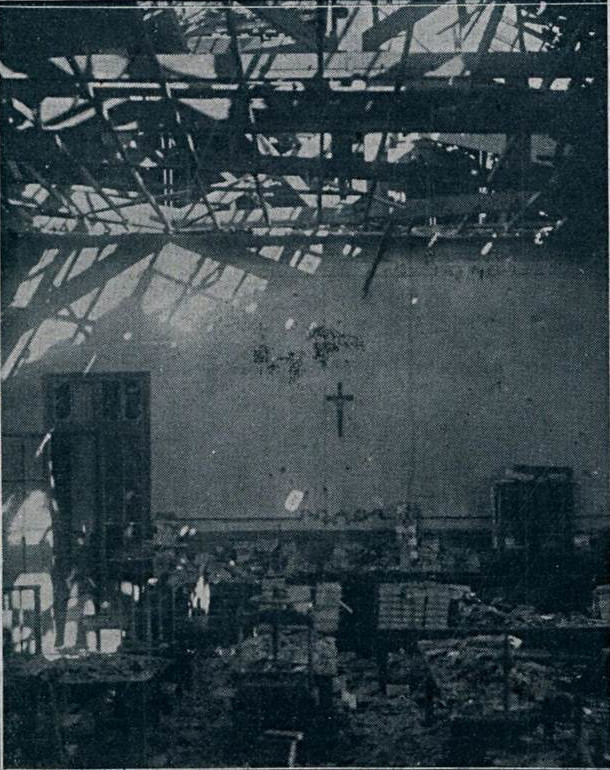
Damage to the binding workshops at Liceu Coração de Jesus

On the morning of 5 July, the 2nd GIAP's 105 mm guns were positioned by the rebels on Campo de Marte. From there, they fired the first artillery shots of the conflict, after 09:00, aimed at the Campos Elíseos Palace, seat of the state government, where the loyalist forces focused their defensive effort. The bombardment was supposed to break the defenders' resistance, but it did not intimidate the governor to leave the palace or even to take refuge in the cellars.

The target was four kilometers away from Campo de Marte. Due to the need to fire regulation shots, the imperfection of the maps and the gunners' inexperience, several shells hit civilians, causing the first deaths of the conflict. At Liceu Coração de Jesus, 350 meters from the palace, a student was seriously injured. Two more shots hit homes on Nothmann Boulevard, killing a woman and a boy and wounding a woman. At the São Bento Monastery, artillery interrupted a mass for those killed in the Copacabana Fort revolt. General Isidoro Dias Lopes suspended the bombardment due to civilian deaths, but it was resumed at 16:00, targeting the region of Praça da Sé, where the government secretariats were located. Collateral damage occurred in the office of architect Ramos de Azevedo, on Boa Vista Street, and in the bandstand of Largo do Palácio's garden. In Liberdade, rebel artillery targeted the barracks of the 5th Battalion of the Public Force.

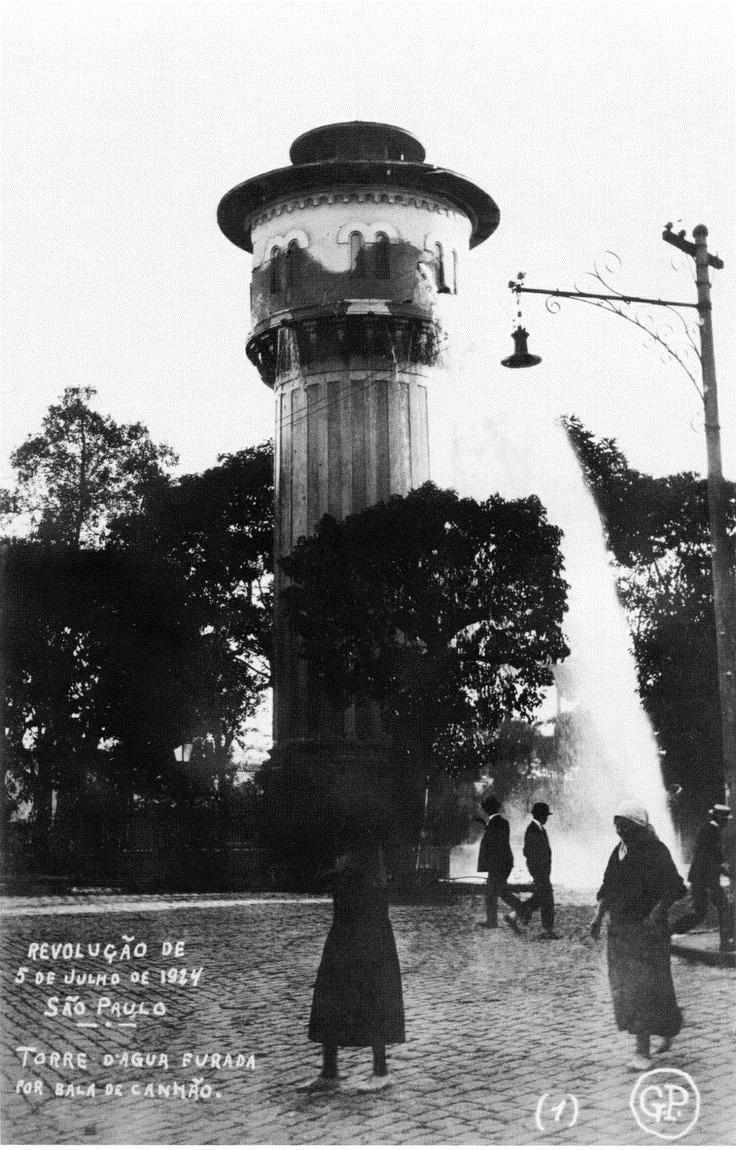
Luz water tank pierced by artillery

On the morning of 6 July, the bombardment of the palace eased and the focus shifted to the besieged loyalists in the 4th Battalion of the Public Force, in Luz. From Ponte Pequena, lieutenant Eduardo Gomes destroyed the machine gun emplacements and set the command building on fire. The bombardment only ceased when revolutionary commander Miguel Costa was informed of the prisoners held inside the barracks—captains Joaquim and Juarez Távora and lieutenants Índio do Brasil and Castro Afilhado. Revolutionary artillery also damaged Luz's water tank and the Polytechnic School. (Note: Castro 2022, p. 52. As for the water tank, included by this source as a wrong target, Doria 2016 praises Eduardo Gomes' aim, calling it the barracks water tank, leaving the defenders without water. Assunção 2015 cites a statement by Antônio Bueno Salgado in which, as part of a larger government attack, enemy soldiers climbed into a water tank in Tiradentes Avenue; in response, the rebels (no mention of Eduardo Gomes) fired on the water tank, dislodging the loyalists.)

The bombardment of the Campos Elíseos Palace was resumed with greater efficiency on the afternoon of 8 July. Heavy artillery, positioned, depending on the sources, on Morro dos Ingleses, the Araçá Cemetery or on Campo de Marte itself, convinced the governor to leave the place and take refuge in the Secretariat of Justice, next to Patio do Colégio. His opponents did not know this, but they saw the concentration of high-ranking officials at the site. A 105 mm howitzer at the intersection of Cantareira Avenue and João Teodoro Street, under orders from Eduardo Gomes, opened fire at 15:30. Due to its elevated position, Largo do Palácio was easy to reach, and a single petard killed six of the sailors guarding the site. The governor withdrew once again, this time to Guaiaúna, where the concentration of government forces was taking place.

Rebel artillery remained active throughout the month, but loyalist reinforcements left it at a severe disadvantage. The rebel gunners had no fixed point, moving from one place to another during the night. In a rare case of friendly fire, on 12 July, 105 mm guns hit rebel positions at the Maria Zélia Factory, whose defenders had requested artillery support. On 15 July, artillery targeted the loyalists at the Glória Church, in Largo do Cambuci.

In the book Sob a metralha, published in 1924, Ciro Costa and Eurico de Góis accused the rebels of having fired at random, with hidden guns, to deceive the population, making them believe that they were being bombed by the government. The accusations were based on the origin and direction of the howitzers, which would have been observed by many residents of São Paulo. The authors are strongly loyalist and against the rebels; according to Moacir Assunção, there is no evidence for this accusation.

=== By the loyalists ===
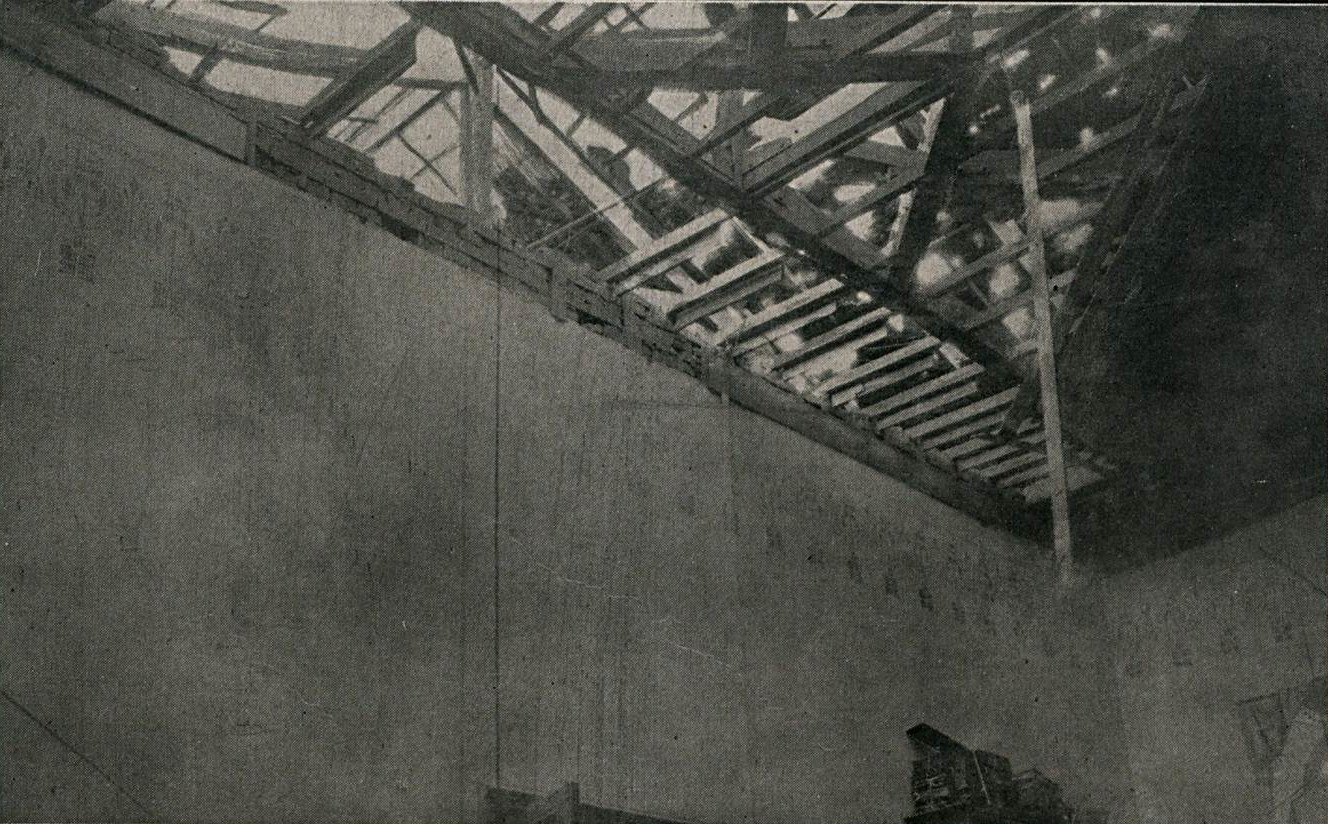
Effect of a shell on the revolutionary command in the Luz barracks

On 8 July, the barracks of the Public Force of São Paulo, in Luz, where the rebel command was located, were attacked by cannons from the Brazilian Navy, positioned on Travessa do Mercado, and from the Itaipu Fort, positioned on Esplanada do Carmo. The resulting artillery duel damaged the shutters of Itaipu's guns and the shaft of one of the navy's guns. On the night of 8 to 9 July, by order of general Cândido Pamplona, loyalist cannons in Vila Matilde fired 50 shots towards Brás and Luz, causing two fires in Brás and several deaths, all of them civilians, including three children, in a working-class village at Conselheiro Belisário Street.

As reinforcements arrived, the divisional artillery stayed on the sides of Guaiaúna and Ipiranga. The intensity of the bombings increased on 10 and 11 July, now also reaching Mooca, Belenzinho and the city's center. The shells landed in densely populated areas devoid of military targets, destroying houses and starting fires. At the Santa Casa Hospital, most of the wounded were civilians from Brás, "almost all hit by shells inside their own homes". Houses of entire families victimized on the same occasion by the same shell are cited.

On 12 July, a 75mm battery was ordered to bombard Praça da República, on information that the rebels had placed cannons there. Some people present at the site tried to demonstrate that it would be impossible to position a battery in the square, but they were ignored. Loyalist guns opened fire, but missed; two shells exploded on the Santa Ifigênia viaduct, one on Largo São Bento, one on Hotel d'Oeste and another on Largo do Paissandu.

The bombardment "lasted days and nights without ceasing". The affected area extended on 14 July to Liberdade, Aclimação, Vila Mariana and two wealthy neighborhoods, Vila Buarque and Campos Elíseos. Paraíso was also hit throughout the month. Working-class neighborhoods in the east of the city, such as Brás, Belenzinho and Mooca, in addition to Luz, were the hardest hit; to the south, Ipiranga and Cambuci stood out. The more upscale residential neighborhoods suffered much less damage, but they were not spared.

Residential areas hit by the bombing

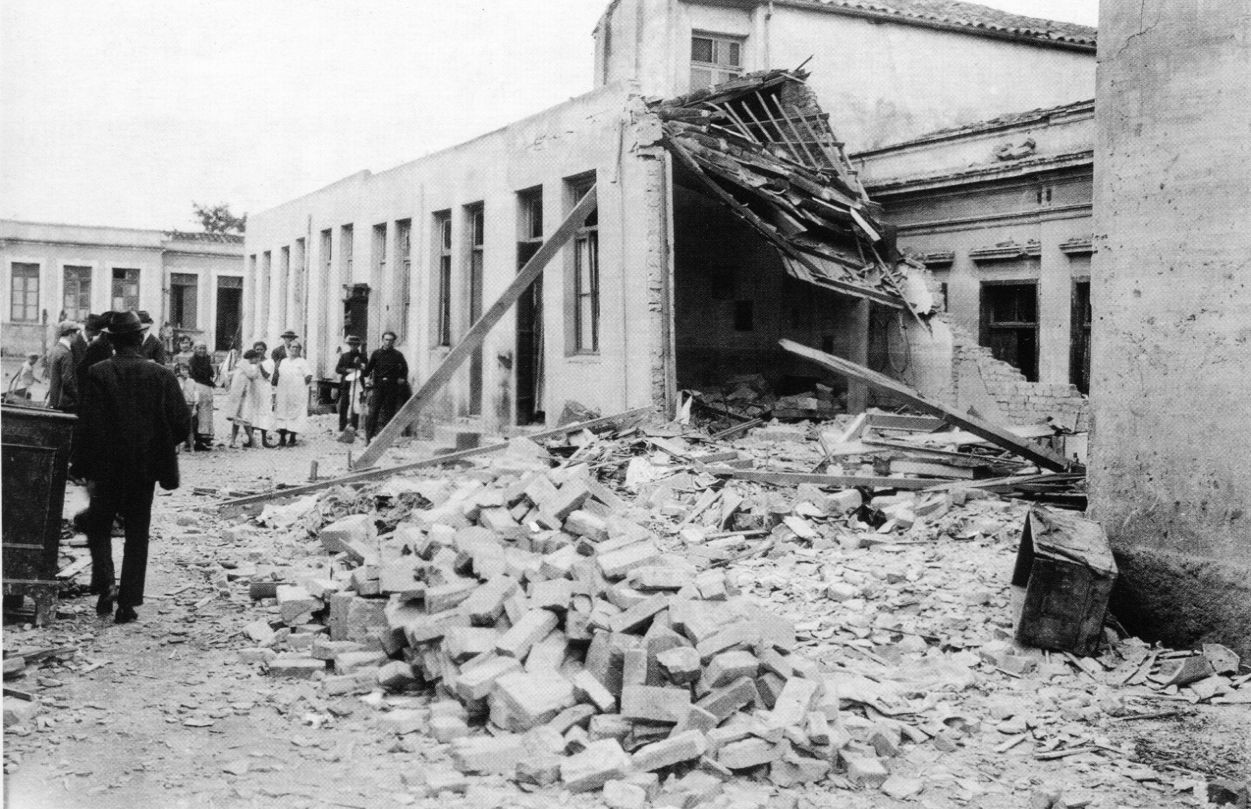
Caetano Pinto Street

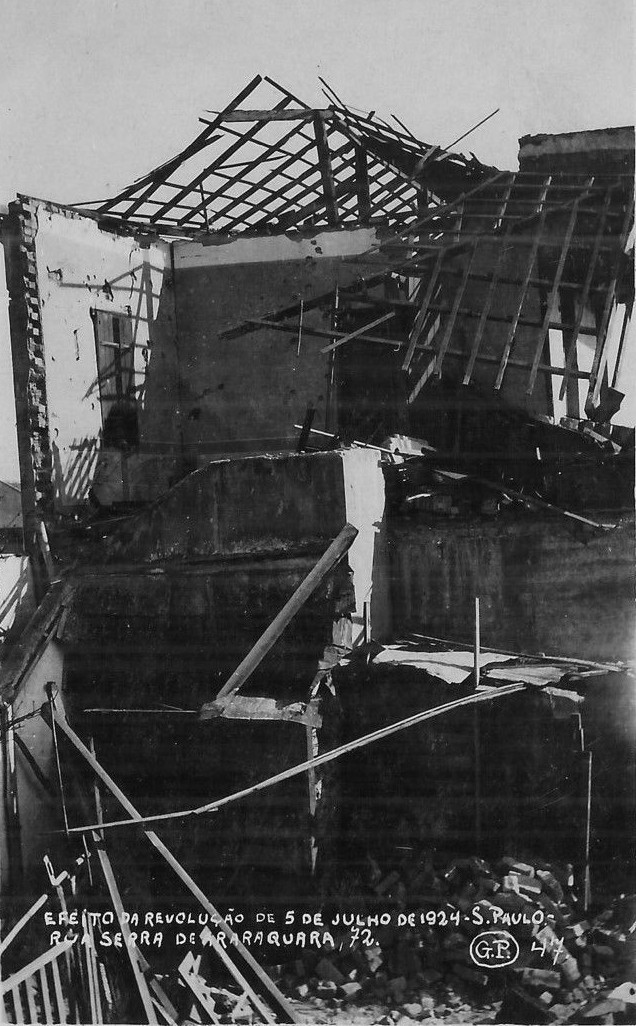
Serra de Araraquara Street

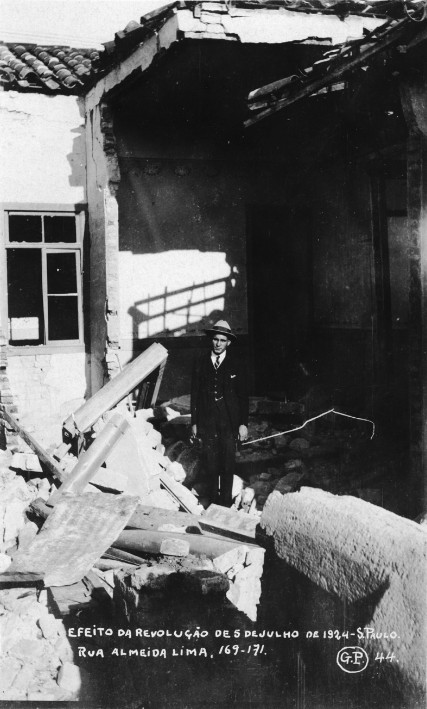
Almeida Lima Street

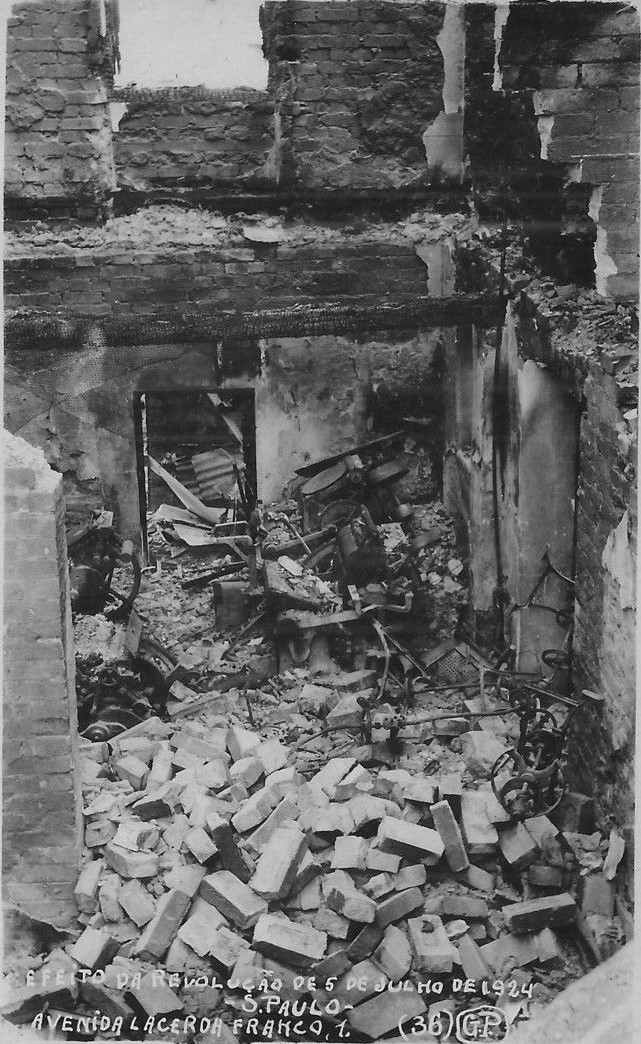
Lacerda Franco Avenue

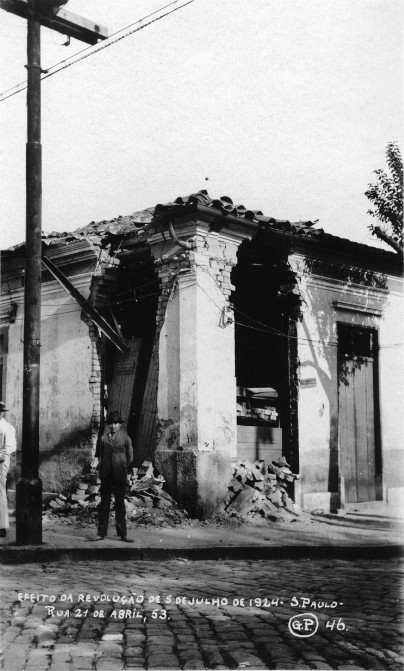
21 de Abril Street

An emblematic target was the Theatro Olympia, located on Rangel Pestana Avenue, in Brás, half a kilometer from the nearest trenches, in Estação do Norte, and more than a kilometer away from the Luz barracks. On 15 July, loyalist artillery destroyed the theater's columns, ceiling and walls, which collapsed on the dozens of displaced families present there. Dozens of people manually removed the rubble, from which the groans of the buried victims could be heard. There were 30 dead and around 80 wounded.

On the front line, the Arlindo brigade positioned thirty eight, 75 and 105 millimeter cannons on the heights of Aclimação and Vila Mariana. They silenced the rebels' machine-gun fire located at the Ipiranga Museum, on 10 July, carried out a previous bombardment of the Glória Church before an attack on 15 July, and hit the tower of the Guanabara Brewery, where there were machine-gun emplacements, on 20 July. Around 12 July, the Pantaleão Telles brigade received artillery support in its attack on the Maria Zélia Factory, opening furrows in the ground just five meters from the enemy positions.

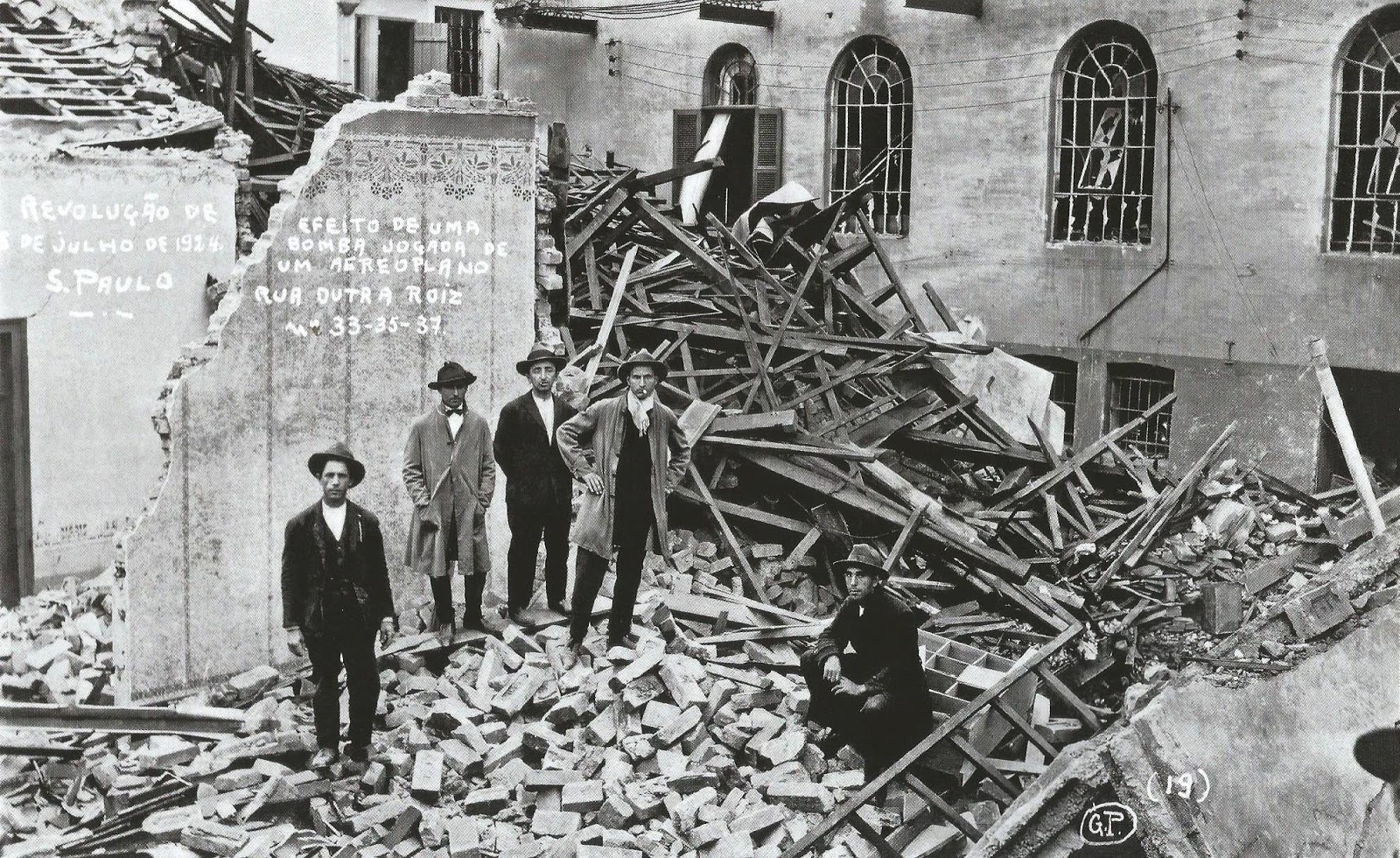
Effect of an air strike

The navy's railway artillery was used in Mooca, where it was harassed by a rebel cannon. On 25 July, a rebel armored train was caught in an ambush at the warehouses of the Central do Brasil Railway. Two shots from loyalist artillery on Penha Hill were enough to blow up a wagon and derail the locomotive. Another train, right behind, was also hit when it came to help the wounded, including colonel João Francisco, commander of the sector.

Loyalist aviation began bombing missions on 22 July. There was a single attack on the Luz barracks, with three bombers, but they flew too high and missed the target. There were no casualties and material damage was less than that caused by artillery, but the psychological impact was considerable.

The attack on the symbol of São Paulo's industrial power, the Cotonifício Crespi, in Mooca, shocked and impressed even loyalist observers. The factory complex, occupied by rebel troops and displaced families, was set on fire as many as five different times and partially destroyed. The incendiary shells started several fires in houses in the neighborhood. The last of the factory fires, on 22 July, raised plumes of smoke that were visible for miles around. The cotton spinning section, several cloth sections, and the manager's residence were ruined, and the stock of goods was destroyed. A large yarn of thread finishing and cloth had its roof destroyed, and the damage was serious enough for it to be demolished after the conflict.

Other industries damaged in Mooca were Companhia Antarctica Paulista, Duchen Biscuits, and Moinhos Gamba. The mayor's report on the conflict recorded 1,800 buildings damaged by shells and bullets and 103 commercial and industrial establishments damaged, of which 17 suffered major damage from the bombing. This was the largest bombing in the city's history. Targets such as Theatro Olympia, the Glória Church, Cotonifício Crespi, and Duchen Biscuits were emblematic.

Factories hit by the bombing

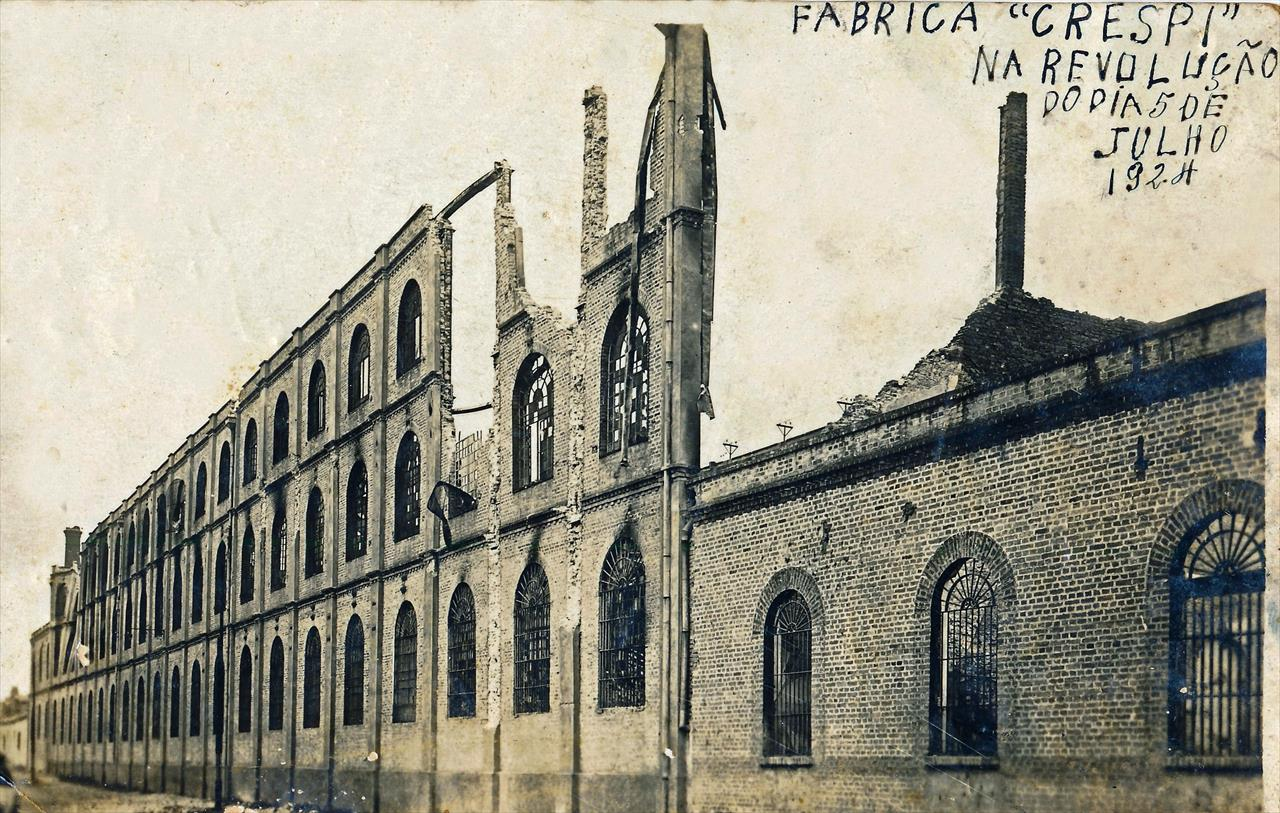
Cotonifício Crespi

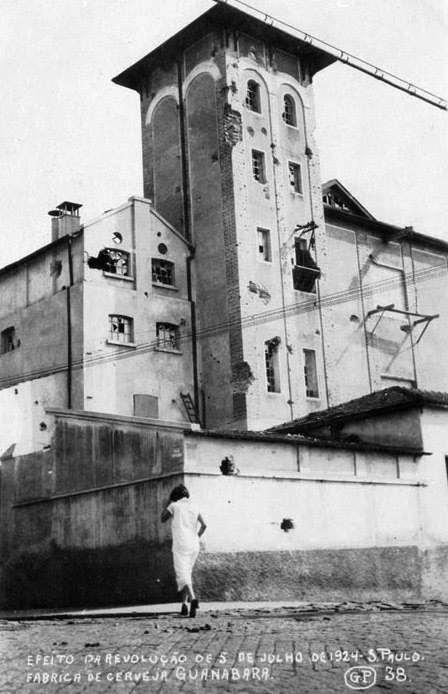
Guanabara Brewery

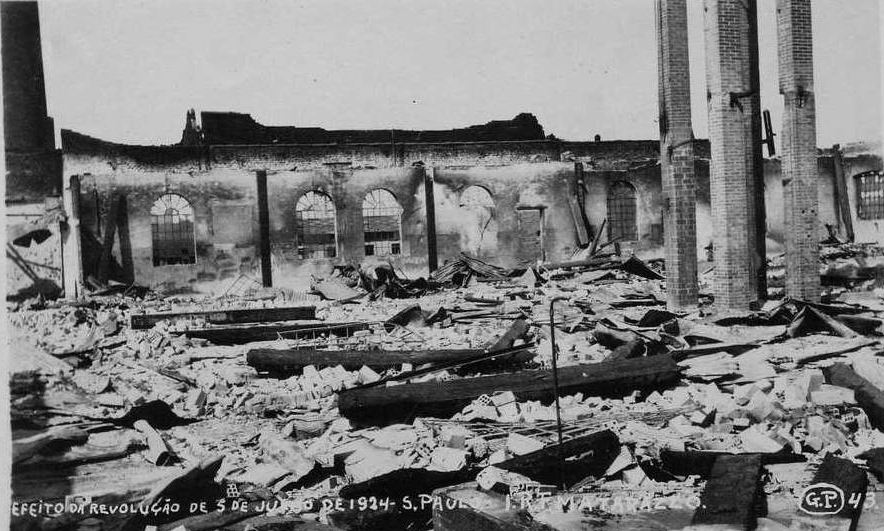
Matarazzo Industries

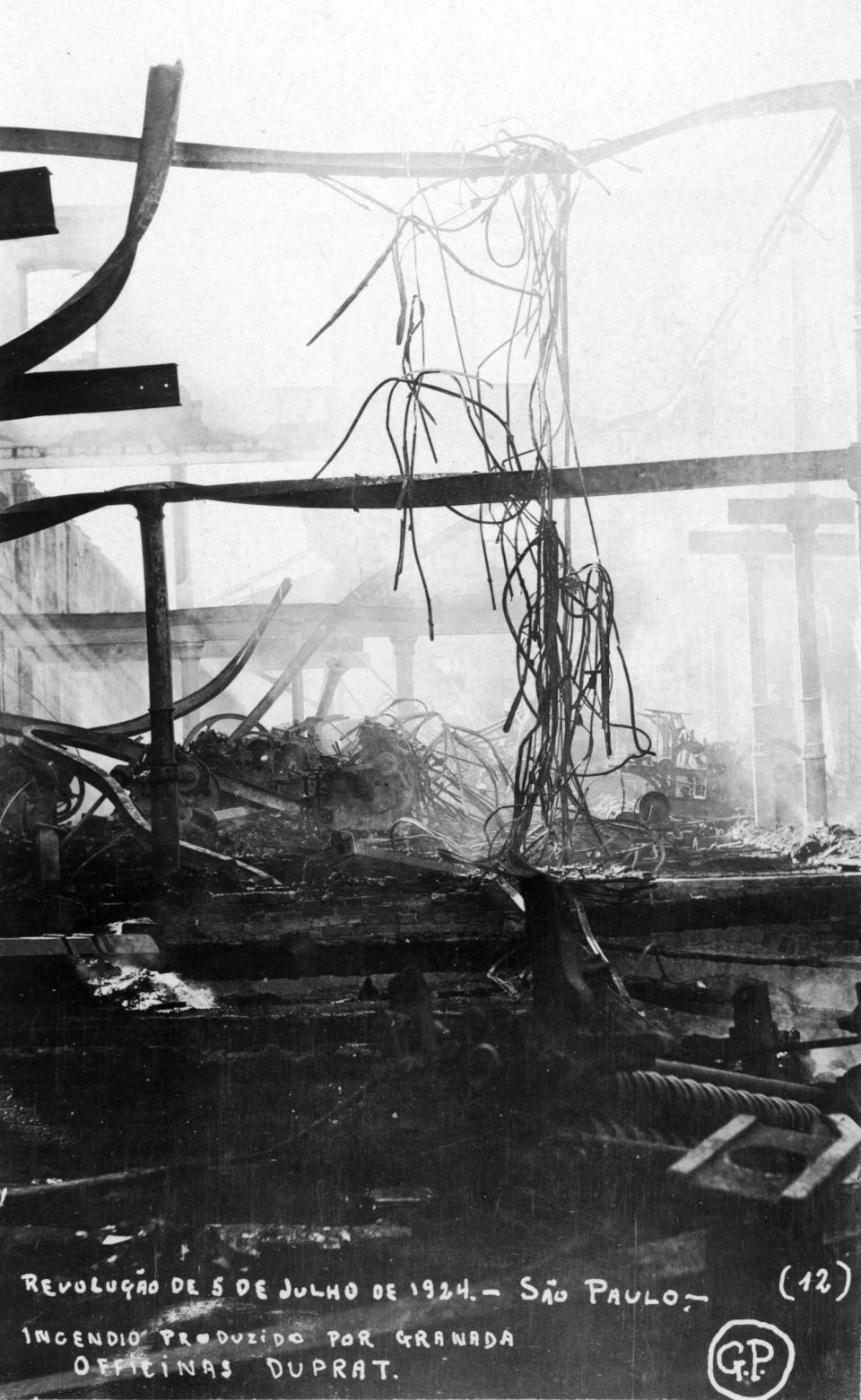
Duprat Workshops

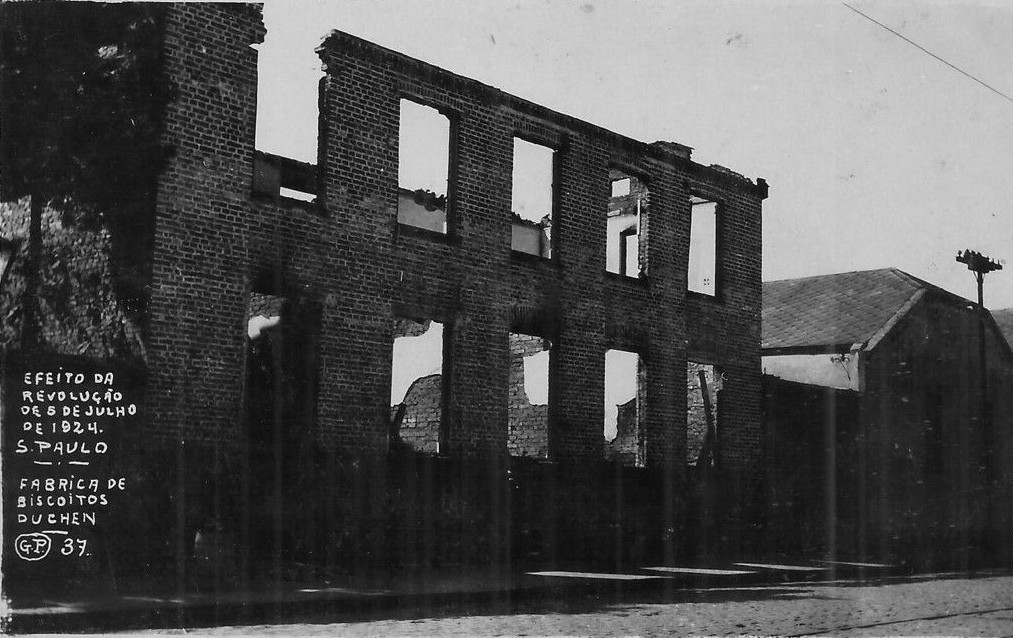
Duchen Biscuits

== Consequences for the local population ==
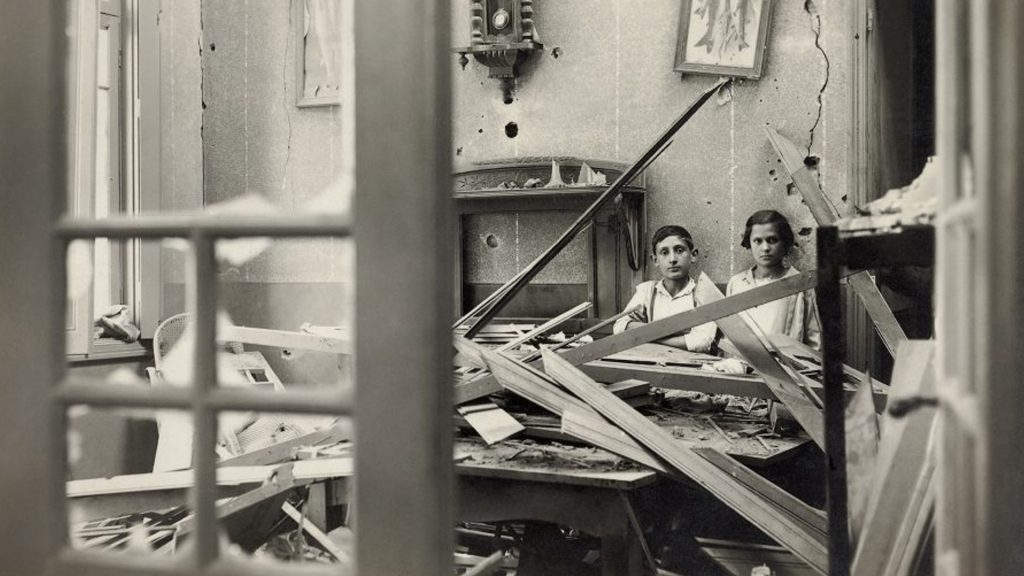
Children in a bombed-out house

The Brazilian Army's artillery was the main cause of the 503 killed and 4,846 wounded accounted for by the municipal government after the end of the conflict. International agencies accounted for around 1,000 deaths. Most of the casualties were civilians; at Santa Casa Hospital, of the 802 wounded hospitalized as a result of the revolt, only 200 were military personnel. Government cannons were largely responsible: the rebels also used their artillery on the city, killing civilians and damaging buildings, but their firepower could not match that of the government, and the resulting damage was much less.

When the rebels fired the first cannon shots on the morning of 5 July, the day had begun like any other. The fighting and bombings, throughout the month, paralyzed work in the factories and altered the movement of people. When loyalist bombings reached residential areas, terror was widespread; its victims lived with fear, the destruction of homes, and the death of acquaintances and family members. In the words of a resident of Paraíso,

The shells passed, whistling, in diabolical and short arcs, almost flush with our house's roof (...) The house of (...) lawyer Antônio Bento Vidal, in the direction of ours, had been (...) hit by three consecutive 75mm shells. One of them had collapsed the entire exterior staircase, made of stone, cement and iron. Another had ripped off, moving incredibly, the washing tank, located in the basement and protected by a wall. Yet another, breaking through ceilings and internal divisions, shattered in the couple's bedroom.

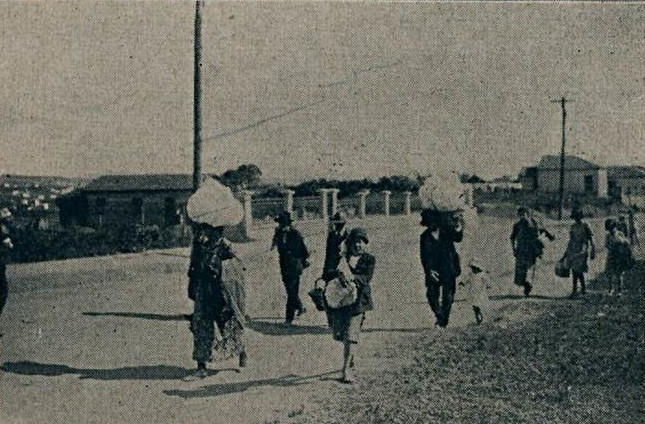
Refugees leaving the city

Alongside the violence came hunger, due to unemployment and shortages. Then came the populations' exodus to suburban and rural areas and inner cities. The mayor's office estimated that a third of the city's population (250 of the 700,000 inhabitants) had fled, mainly from the bombed regions. Even the inhabitants of the richer neighborhoods feared the bombing and left the city. Those who could not flee survived as refugees in their cellars. Theaters, school groups, and churches served as shelters. Henrique Geenen, a memoirist of the revolt, recalled how the neighboring houses were abandoned by their residents and occupied by other people fleeing the fighting. His home sheltered two homeless families. Books and clothing served as protection against shrapnel.

In response to the bombing, the city spent the nights in darkness, without electricity, lit only by the fires. Such fires occurred both by government bombs and by popular action after the numerous looting of commercial establishments, resulting from supply shortages. According to a resident of Chora Menino,

At night, the city looked like a birthday cake, with its little candles, such was the number of fires. When the bombing ended, we couldn't sleep. The silence was terrible. We had gotten used to the noise of the cannons.

São Paulo's economic elite, harmed by the bombings, looting and interruption of work, approached the rebels and the city's government. Mayor Firmiano de Morais Pinto, kept in office by the revolutionary command, adopted, among other measures, the reorganization of firefighters. The original Fire Department, belonging to the Public Force, was dismantled. After participating in the fighting, (Note: See, for example, Costa & Góis 1924, p. 4 and 188.) part of the firefighters withdrew on 8 July with the rest of the loyalist forces, and the rest became prisoners of the rebels. José Carlos de Macedo Soares, president of the Commercial Association of São Paulo, asked general Isidoro to release the arrested firefighters, and the request was granted. The firefighters took action on 25 July, already too late, but managed to prevent the spread of several large fires.

== Requests to stop the bombing ==
Artur Bernardes and his ministers. Setembrino de Carvalho is first, from right to left, in the second row

Representatives of São Paulo's elite mediated negotiations between the conflicting sides, fearing the radicalization of the revolt. In the evaluation of Macedo Soares, "the annihilation of the industrial power of S. Paulo continues every day, by the destructive effect of the shells, and by the devouring flames of the fires. The workers are already agitating and Bolshevik aspirations are openly manifested".

Macedo Soares obtained a commitment from general Isidoro not to use his artillery, as long as the loyalists did the same. Soares formed a commission together with the mayor and Dom Duarte Leopoldo e Silva, the metropolitan archbishop, Vergueiro Steidel, president of the Nationalist League, and Júlio de Mesquita, director of O Estado de São Paulo, to ask the president of Brazil to stop the bombing, due to the harm it caused to the population of São Paulo. The mayor telephoned president Artur Bernardes, who, in turn, consulted governor Carlos de Campos. In the governor's opinion, "São Paulo would rather see its beautiful capital destroyed than legality in Brazil destroyed". The president thought the same, confiding to another interlocutor: "If São Paulo is destroyed at the price of preserving the rule of law, this destruction is justified". On 12 July, the office of Minister of War Setembrino de Carvalho responded to a telegram from the delegation from São Paulo:

We cannot wage war constrained by the duty of not using artillery against the enemy, who would take advantage of this circumstance, causing us incomparably more serious damage than the damage caused by bombing. The material damage caused by a bombing can be easily repaired (...) But moral damage is not susceptible to repair (...) I can, however, assure Your Excellency and other fellow citizens that our troops will not cause useless material damage to the beautiful and flourishing city of São Paulo, otherwise they will use artillery to the strict extent of military needs.

The consuls of Portugal, Italy and Spain, concerned about the damage to immigrants, went to Guaiaúna, where general Sócrates presented his idea: the rebels would deliver a map with the position of their troops, and thus the government artillery would no longer hit the population. The proposal was insincere, and the rebels would not reveal their positions.

Macedo Soares managed to convince general Abílio de Noronha, former commander of the 2nd Military Region and now a prisoner of the rebels, to mediate peace negotiations. The initiative failed when Isidoro included the resignation of Artur Bernardes as one of his conditions, which Noronha considered unacceptable to demand.

On 26 July, loyalist planes dropped bulletins with a message from the Minister of War, dated the day before:

To the population of São Paulo. The lawful troops must act freely against the seditious ones, who persist in fighting under the moral protection of the civilian population, whose painful sacrifice we must avoid. We appeal to the noble and industrious population of São Paulo to abandon the city, leaving the rebels to fend for themselves. This is a hard necessity that we urgently need to accept as imperative in order to put an end, once and for all, to the state of affairs created by this sedition that debases our credit as a cultured people. I hope that everyone will heed this appeal, as is necessary, to spare themselves the effects of the military operations that, in a few days, will be carried out.

The bulletin was interpreted as a threat of a final and even more intense bombardment. The population that could not leave the city panicked, and Isidoro hastened his attempts at negotiation. Through Macedo Soares, he expressed his interest in a 48-hour armistice and surrender in exchange for amnesty for the 1922 and 1924 rebels. Macedo Soares wrote a letter, on behalf of the conservative classes, accusing the federal authorities and loyalist commanders of not knowing the reality. He warned of the danger of social unrest, which the bombing only increased. Journalist Paulo Duarte delivered the letter to Carlos de Campos in Guaiaúna, on the morning of 27 July. The governor felt offended, accused Macedo Soares of colluding with the rebels, and promised to intensify the bombing, stating that "The shell will be the answer".

On the night of 27 July, the rebels left the city, boarding trains to the countryside. In his last manifesto to the population, general Isidoro justified his decision by the "desire to spare São Paulo from a heartbreaking destruction" and mentioned how the mayor, once "invited to go to Rio de Janeiro to come to an understanding with Catete, conveyed to us the obstinate certainty and the desperate attitude with which they are bombing here without military objectives, but with inhuman intentions and to create panic and torture to the population of this admirable city".

== Questioning and interpretations ==
The prevailing historical memory about Artur Bernardes, Carlos de Campos and their generals sees the bombing very negatively. Accused by his enemies of cruelty and tyranny, Artur Bernardes gained the reputation of destroyer of São Paulo. Only a few authors defended him, seeking to justify the bombing as a hard, but necessary decision against a greater evil: Ciro Costa and Eurico de Góis, in Sob a metralha, and Aureliano Leite, in Dias de Pavor.

Artur Bernardes made little mention of the bombing in the years after the conflict. Wladimir de Toledo Piza, the future mayor of São Paulo, related an explanation from Bernardes, received in 1946: a confidential report from Brazil's Ministry of Foreign Affairs pointed to an imminent invasion by the U.S. Navy in the Amazon, given the weakness of the Brazilian government, and the bombing would be the only way to demonstrate Brazil's capacity to defend its territory. This version is consistent with the nationalist image projected by Bernardes, but it seems unlikely since, despite the American interventions in Central America in that period, the Banana Wars, the American president in 1924, Calvin Coolidge, was seen as little prone to military interventions abroad.

=== Military analysis ===
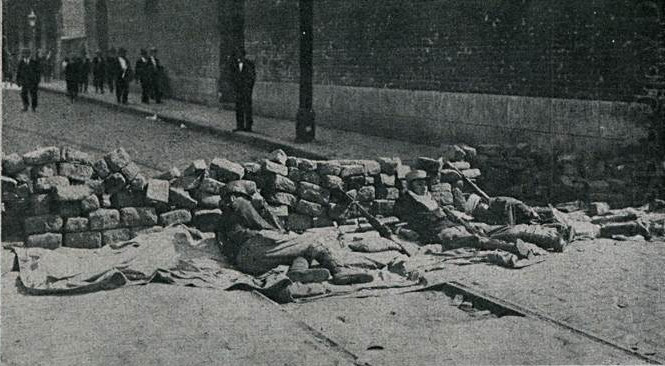
The rudimentary trenches of the rebels

The Minister of War had a very positive impression of the loyalist army's performance, especially of infantry-artillery coordination. Conversely, several combatants reported the bombing as ineffective against the rebel army. According to rebel lieutenant João Cabanas, "while the shells lightly wounded any soldier, they killed hundreds of civilians, mostly women and children". For corporal Antônio Bueno Salgado, "they fired without knowing where, because we were never dislodged by enemy artillery, they only hit houses". Juarez Távora defined the bombing as "deadly for the civilian population, but innocuous for the revolutionary troops", "without the precise directive of a prefixed military objective, without careful observations that corrected its errors, without shortage of ammunition that limited it", "dispersive and useless".

The need for the bombardment, according to general Sócrates, was to overcome the good defensive positions of the enemy in the urban terrain, "a stronghold of streets with large buildings that, even destroyed, would offer room for defense, organized from rubble". The government, perhaps because it did not trust its troops, may have opted for a strategy of progressive attrition, even if this meant "sterile and pernicious bombing of civilian targets". To the leadership, bombing may have seemed like a way to spare loyalist soldiers by avoiding direct combat.

But there was no need for large caliber artillery, as evaluated by general Abílio de Noronha, because, contrary to Sócrates' description, the enemy fortifications were weak and discontinuous. Shortly after the conflict, he published a critique of loyalist army tactics, based on his technical knowledge of bombing and weaponry. He wrote:

What is the true role of artillery?

That of destroying the opponent, however, for that, precise, slow shots are necessary, with rigorous observation of the impacts and with use of ammunition necessary to destroy, in complete safety, the objective (...) Effective shots must be preceded, as a general rule, by a regulation shot (...)

Was this the role of the Guaiaúna artillery?

We have no hesitation in answering in the most absolute negative. Who does not remember the continuous and accelerated firing of the various batteries during the night, without aim, without regulation, without observation of impacts and without the slightest military range?

Firing at night, recalled Noronha, only took place in the First World War thanks to a very meticulous previous study of enemy positions, and even so, the general rule was the interruption of artillery fire at the end of the afternoon. In São Paulo, reconnaissance aviation provided only very vague information, and at no time were planes used to correct the shots. Loyalist artillery, he said, fired aimlessly at the capital, hitting targets of no military value.

=== Targets: military or civilian ===
General Sócrates' report described how the 155 mm guns were called in to destroy "depots and enemy organizations", presenting loyalist artillery as an instrument to overcome military resistance. This is not consistent with the targets that were actually hit, most of which were of no military value, nor with the obituary statistics, in which civilians were the main victims. Ciro Costa and Eurico de Góis defended the bombing, claiming the "fatality of this unpatriotic moment"; if there were no orders to spare civilians, the city would be off the map; and only "rare shots" missed their targets. At least one miscalculation is known, the attempted bombing of Praça da República, but the number of buildings hit in the city was enormous (1,800).

Revolutionaries, government critics and even general Abílio de Noronha himself accused the government artillery of firing without a defined target against densely populated areas, with full knowledge that it would kill civilians, in a "terrorizing bombing" or "German-style bombing". (Note: Contemporary criticism can be seen in the rebel João Cabanas ("big was the target: the entire perimeter of the city of São Paulo", reproduced in Cohen 2007), journalist Paulo Duarte (quoted in Assunção 2014, pp. 33–34) and Abílio de Noronha ("artillery did nothing but fire on the capital of São Paulo", "haphazardly", in Noronha 1924, p. 132).) Historians lend credit to this accusation; the civilians would not have been killed by miscalculations, but deliberately. Blaise Cendrars, a poet passing through Brazil at the time, wrote:

As soon as he had his artillery in position on the hills overlooking the city, general Sócrates, commander of the federal siege troops, unleashed a 'German' bombardment on the open city (...). He knew how to take advantage of the lessons of the Great European War. Having no Reims cathedral to demolish, Sócrates targeted his cannons sometimes at a gleaming new hotel, then a beautiful modern factory, at one of the city's new skyscrapers, wrecking a tram, sending a pastry shop flying, destroying a school, blowing up a square or a bar. (...) It was perceived that the 'loyalist' officers did this with a happy heart. The orders were formal: it was necessary to crush the sedition, the worse for the city, it would be rebuilt.

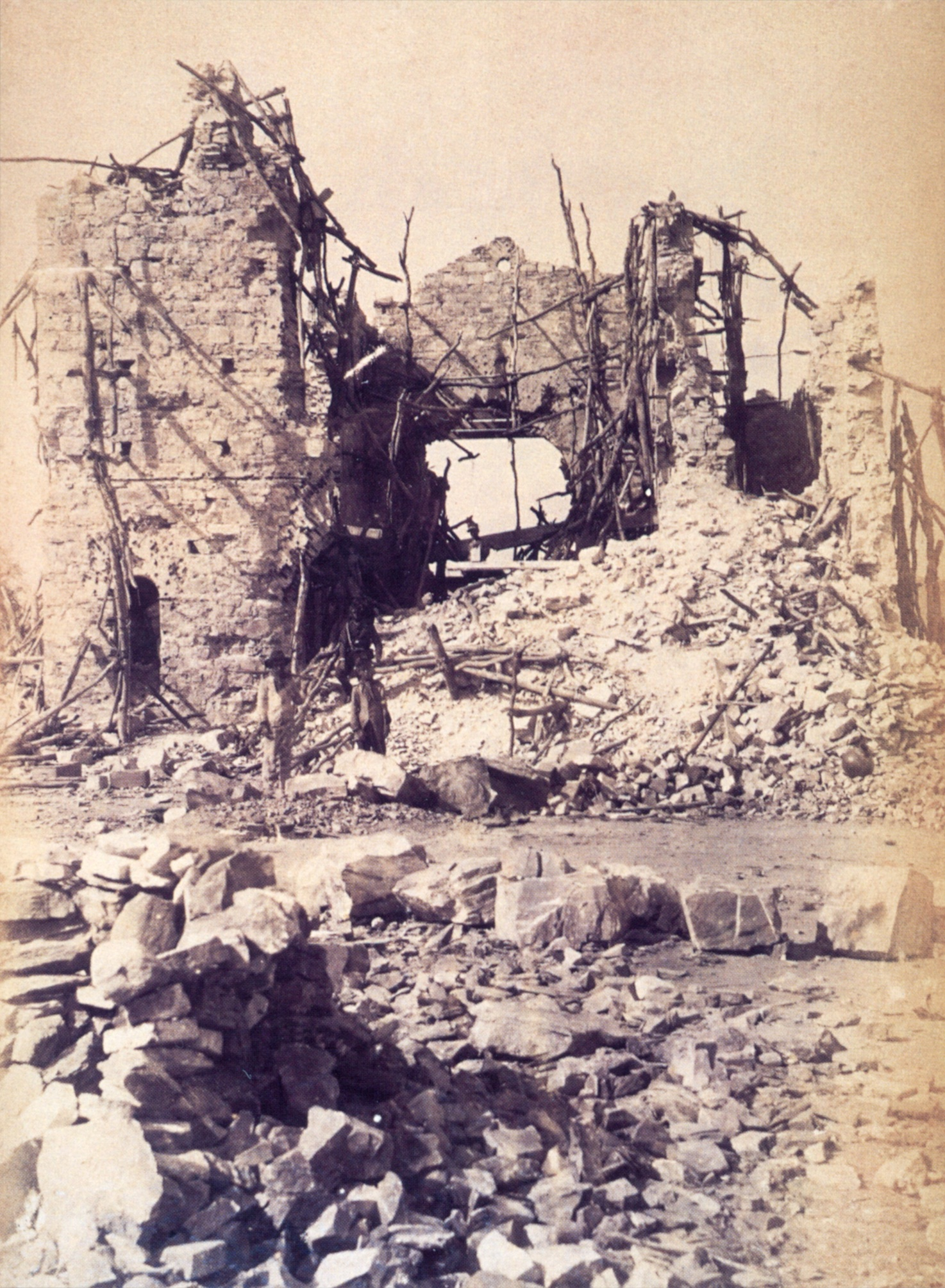
Ruins of a church in Canudos, 1897

The "terrorizing bombardment" would be a way of accelerating the enemy's capitulation, applying psychological pressure for the rebels to abandon the city. Brazilianist Frank McCann speculated that the Brazilian Army was setting aside advice from the French Military Mission and reverting to the brutal methods it used in the Canudos and Contestado wars, an astonishing decision; the population was instructed to leave the city, but São Paulo was too big to be razed like the villages in these two conflicts. (Note: The French recommended heavy and numerous artillery, but what they had in mind was trench warfare (McCann 2009, p. 281).) The memory of the two conflicts was alive, and three important loyalist generals of 1924 were Contestado veterans: Setembrino de Carvalho, Eduardo Sócrates and Tertuliano Potiguara. For Moacir Assunção, these generals may have seen the bombing as a quicker resolution to the conflict, as the enemy was much better prepared this time than in Canudos and Contestado.

If the goal was to put pressure on the rebels, it worked. The suffering of the population was the justification for the withdrawal given by Isidoro to Macedo Soares. The bulletins dropped by government's planes, threatening an even more intense bombing, were on the minds of the rebel leadership. They compared the suffering of the population with the futility of urban combat: the combatants were worn out, many of them wounded, and the only chance of victory would be in the case of uprisings in Rio de Janeiro and Minas Gerais, which were under firm government control. The loyalist advances in the countryside, through Sorocaba and Itu, were a serious threat to the rebels' rearguard: the government's "Southern Column" was about to cut off the possibility of withdrawal.

Another explanation is that the government punished the population of the working-class neighborhoods for their approach to the rebels, even forming foreign battalions within the rebel army, or even in retaliation for the rebel attack against Campos Elíseos and the looting of the city by the population. For Carlo Romani, war had taken the place of politics as an exercise of power, and the poor civilian population is the target of war. Testimonials from inhabitants of Mooca and Brás showed the impression that they were targets of the government. The government's attitude, both in Canudos and in São Paulo, can be interpreted as State terrorism, directed against the population.

The attack on the factories can be interpreted as an attack on the workers, but these buildings had military value: they were used as defensive positions by the rebels, who took advantage of their chimneys to observe enemy movements. Cotonifício Crespi, for example, "dominates the entire height of Mooca", in the words of lieutenant João Cabanas, who positioned a machine gun on top of the building. The tower of the Maria Zélia Factory, according to Cabanas, was the "most important position in the sector", with visibility for the movements of the enemy brigade on the banks of the Tietê. The Antarctic factory is described by other sources as "one of the strongest strongholds of the rebels", and a "tenaciously defended stronghold".

=== Legality or illegality ===
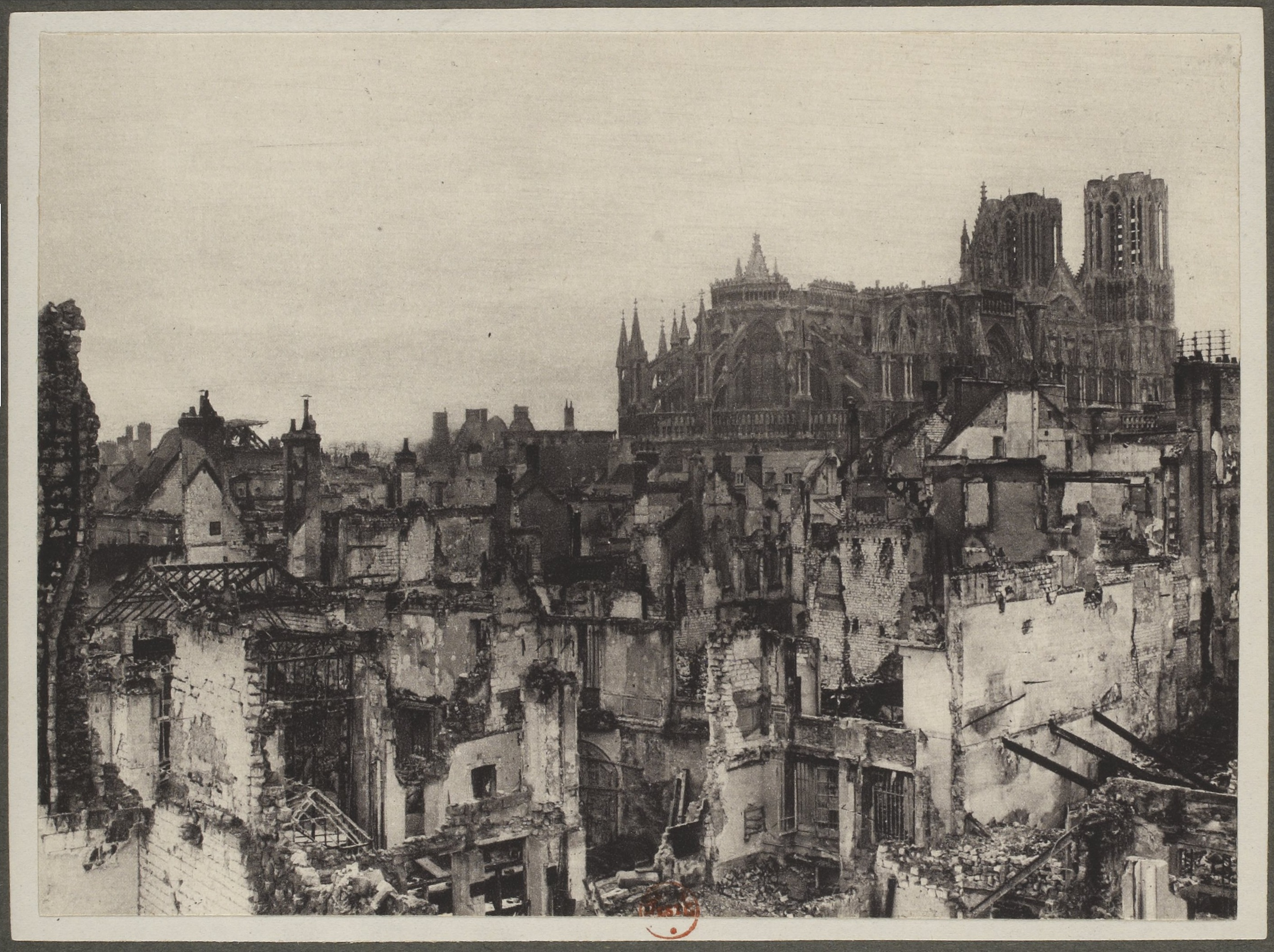
Reims, in France, bombed by the Imperial German Army

Shortly after the end of the fighting, the legality of the government bombing came into debate. International law of the time already repudiated armed attacks against eminently civilian targets, especially against open cities (not fortified and not defended). The "terrorizing bombardment" was deemed immoral, unfair, useless and inhumane. The Hague Convention of 1907 prohibited, in its Article 23, "to employ arms, projectiles, or material calculated to cause unnecessary suffering", in Article 25, "the attack or bombardment, by whatever means, of towns, villages, dwellings, or buildings which are undefended", and in Article 27, the attack on "edifices devoted to religion, art, science, and charity, hospitals, and places where the sick and wounded are collected".

Brazilians had already been exposed to the subject since the First World War, when, in the words of Abílio de Noronha, "the press, in almost all countries of the Universe, spent tons of ink and the best of its flower of rhetoric to preach hatred against the Germans, calling them pirates and Huns, because they fired their artillery at open cities; the great dailies of our country tuned their pitch to that of the allies and rare was the newspaper that did not launch anathema against those vulgar murderers, destroyers of cities, monuments and temples".

Noronha called São Paulo an "open city par excellence, and occupied by a small number of rebels, without fortifications that required long-distance destructive shots". For historian Hélio Silva, "the bombing of an open city represented a monstrosity for which no one wanted to take the blame". Manoel da Costa Manso, a justice of Brazil's Supreme Federal Court (STF) criticized the "inhuman and criminal bombing, dumping cannons on the open city, without respect for the civilian population".

Jurist Lemos Brito defended the government's actions, questioning this interpretation of open cities: "the legitimacy of the aggression does not really depend on the fortification, but on the defense of the place at gunpoint". In international law, there were precedents for attacking an open city under certain conditions. According to Brazilian jurist Lafayette Rodrigues Pereira, "if the open city shelters the enemy in its bosom, if it resists by raising barricades and converting houses and buildings, walls and terrain accidents into trenches and redoubts, immunity disappears". For René Foignet, the bombing of private buildings could be legal to make the city surrender more quickly; in that case, the bombing of São Paulo would only be a war measure for an exceptional situation. STF justice Carlos de Carvalho had recalled in 1895 that acts of war, due to the force majeure of public necessity, did not need to be compensated by the State.

In the case of the bombardment of a city defended by enemy forces, the commander of the attacking troops had the obligation to notify the local authorities in advance, except in circumstances where surprise is permitted. Ciro Costa and Eurico de Góis stated that the government assisted those in need, as far as possible, and gave prior notice to the population. However, the only warning was the bulletin dropped by the planes on 26 July, after 15 days of attack, and even then, the remaining population of the city would not be able to withdraw.

Moreover, the bombing could not be indiscriminate. The attacker was supposed to spare monuments, hospitals and historic sites. According to jurist Clóvis Beviláqua, "the bombardment must be directed against the fortifications of the city and its dependencies and not, intentionally, against the part inhabited by the civilian population, in order to move it to influence the garrison, so that it does not persist in the resistance". The loyalist artillery failed in this regard, as the fortifications were the least affected targets by the bombing, which mainly hit civilians. Jurist Jules Badesvant, consulted by Macedo Soares (at the time, already an enemy of the government), wrote, based on the IV Hague Convention, of 1909:

The city in question was defended by the rebels; but the bombardment was not, it seems, intended to support an attack designed to take the city; it was directed against the whole of the city rather than against the rebel forces; it had more the character of intimidation of the inhabitants than a military operation against an armed adversary. In its execution, apparently, the general duty of not directing hostilities against the entire civilian population was forgotten, thus carrying out destructions that were not imperiously required by the needs of the struggle, contrary to what article 23 of the same regulation prescribes.

Thus, jurists accepted the bombing of military targets, but condemned the indiscriminate attack on densely populated areas. By this reasoning, the Brazilian government committed a war crime in the bombing of São Paulo.

== See also ==
- Domicide
- Urbicide
