= Vila Matilde =

Vila Matilde may refer to:

- Vila Matilde (São Paulo Metro)
- Vila Matilde (district of São Paulo)
