= Cangaíba =

District of São Paulo, Brazil

Coordinates: 23.507°S 46.5285°W

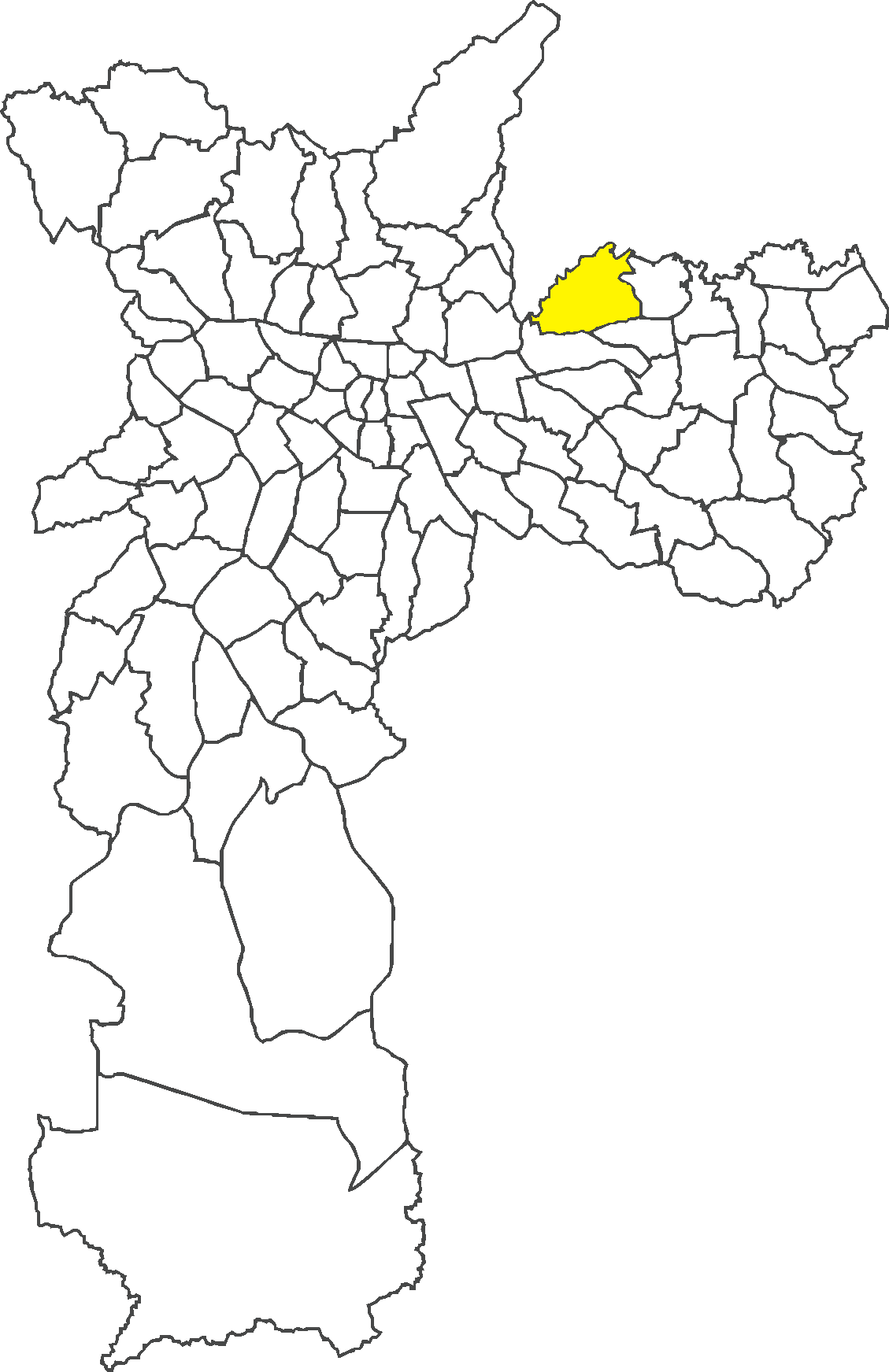
- District of the city of São Paulo
- Country: Brazil
- State: São Paulo
- Municipality: São Paulo
- Subprefecture: Penha

Area
  - Total: 16.00 km^{2} (6.18 sq mi)

Population (2007)
  - Total: 136.623
  - Density: 8,539/km^{2} (22,120/sq mi)
- Website: Subprefecture of Penha

Cangaíba is one of 96 districts in the city of São Paulo, Brazil.

== Description ==
The district is situated on the east side of the Brazilian city of São Paulo, with 136.623 residents, according to the 2010 Census.

To the north, it borders the city of Guarulhos with the Parque Ecológico do Tietê(National Park of Tiete) — a busy part of the region due to the tourism to the park and one of the city's biggest highways Rodovia Ayrton Senna (Ayrton Senna Highway), main connection from São Paulo to the Paraíba Valley. To the east and south, Cangaíba borders the neighborhood of Penha, also to the south borders Ponte Rasa, and further east borders Ermelino Matarazzo, closing its path.

== Etymology ==
The name "Cangaíba" comes from the tupi-guarani Cangaíva, from the junction of caa + nga + iva, where caa is forest, nga is place and iva is fruit, which translates to "place in the forest with many fruits".
