= Subprefecture of Penha =

Coordinates: 23°32′S 46°32′W

- Subprefecture
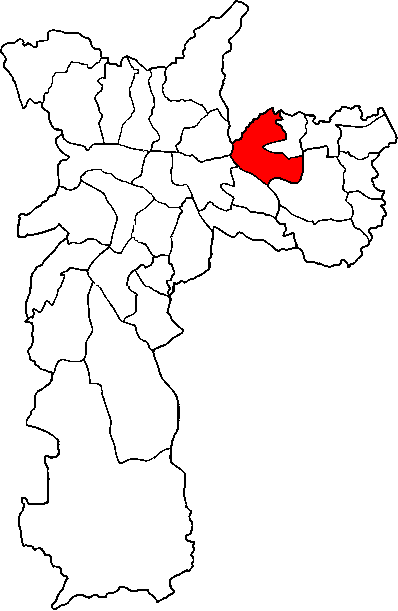
- Location of the Subprefecture of Penha in São Paulo

- Location of municipality of São Paulo within the State of São Paulo
- Country: Brazil
- Region: Southeast
- State: São Paulo
- Municipality: São Paulo
- Administrative Zone: East 1
- Districts: Penha, Cangaíba, Vila Matilde, Artur Alvim

Government
  - Type: Subprefecture
  - Subprefect: Cássio Freire Loschiavo

Area
  - Total: 43.41 km^{2} (16.76 sq mi)

Population (2008)
  - Total: 476,489
- Website: Subprefeitura Penha (Portuguese)

The Subprefecture of Penha is one of 32 subprefectures of the city of São Paulo, Brazil. It comprises four districts: Penha, Cangaíba, Vila Matilde, and Artur Alvim.
