= Artur Alvim =

District of São Paulo, Brazil

Coordinates: 23.533333°S 46.500000°W

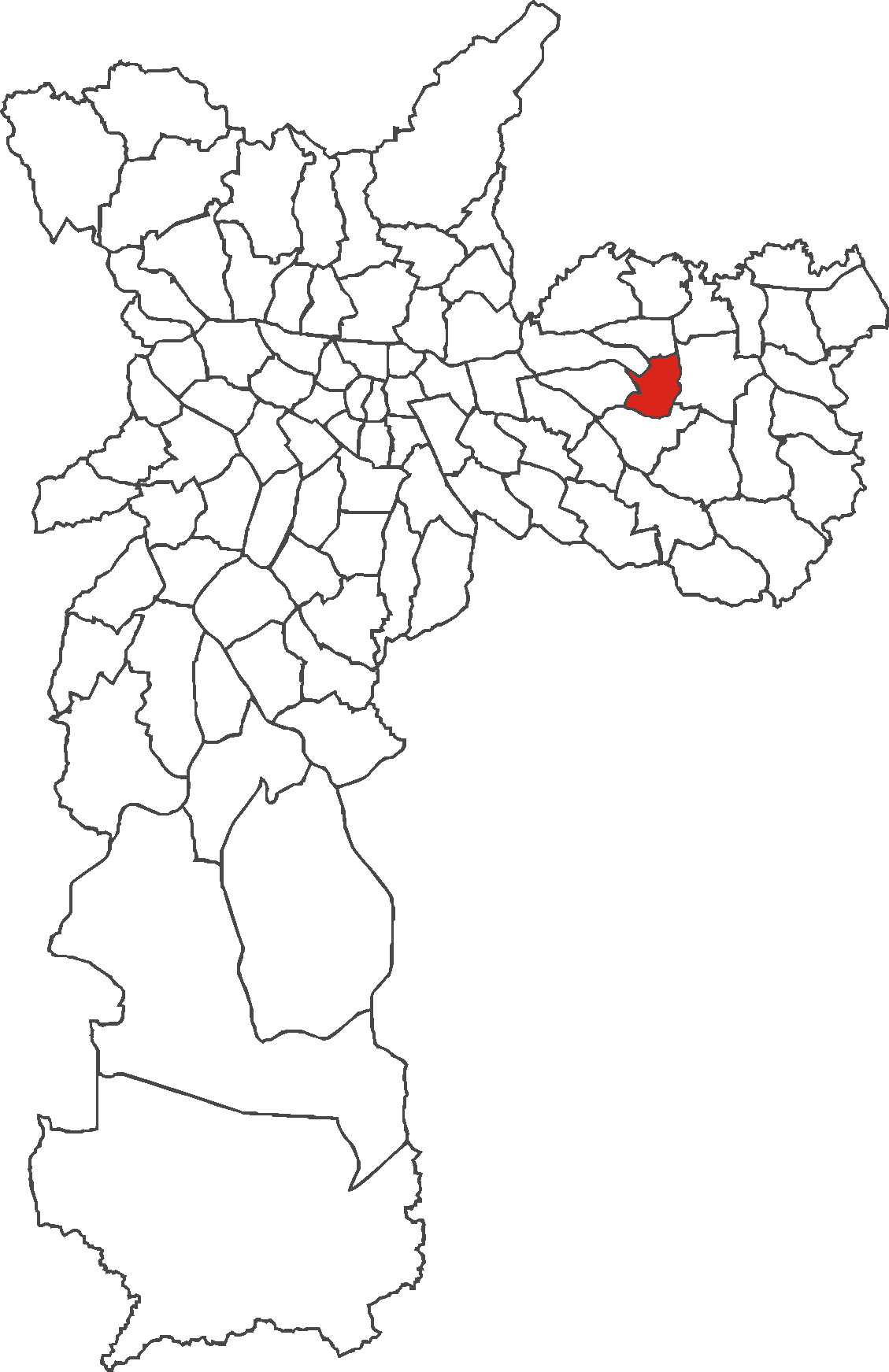
- Location in the city of São Paulo

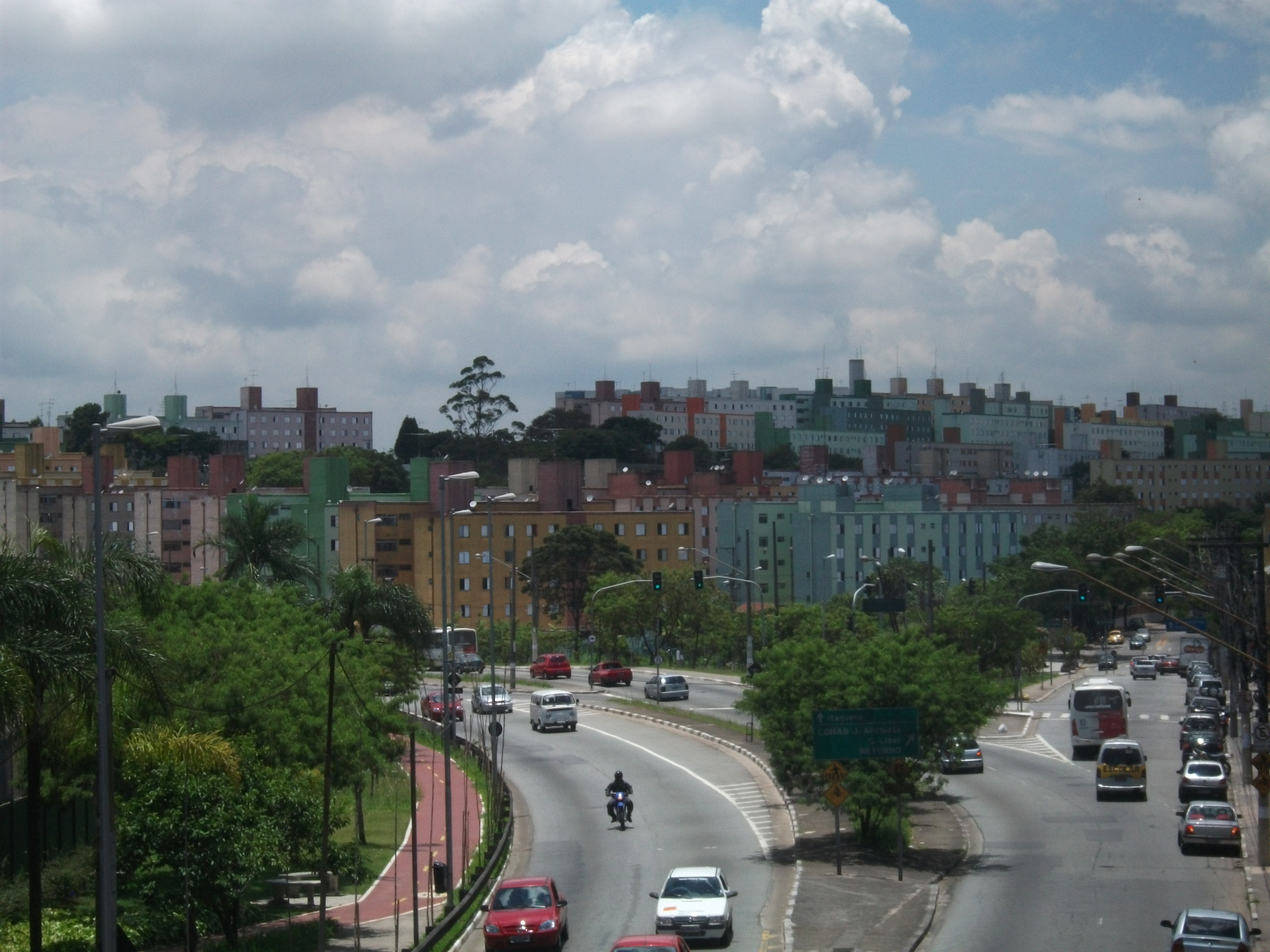
- COHAB Padre Manuel da Nóbrega
- Country: Brazil
- State: São Paulo
- City: São Paulo

Government
  - Type: Subprefecture
  - Subprefect: Cássio Freire Loschiavo

Area
  - Total: 6.6 km^{2} (2.5 sq mi)

Population (2000)
  - Total: 111,210
  - Density: 16.85/km^{2} (43.6/sq mi)
- HDI: 0.783–medium
- Website: Subprefecture of Penha

Artur Alvim is a district in the subprefecture of Penha in the city of São Paulo, placed in the eastern suburban area of the city. It constitutes in a medium-low income neighbourhood, with a mixed space occupied by residences and local commerce. It is served by the Artur Alvim station of the São Paulo metro.
