= Guilhermina-Esperança (São Paulo Metro) =

São Paulo Metro station

Guilhermina–Esperança
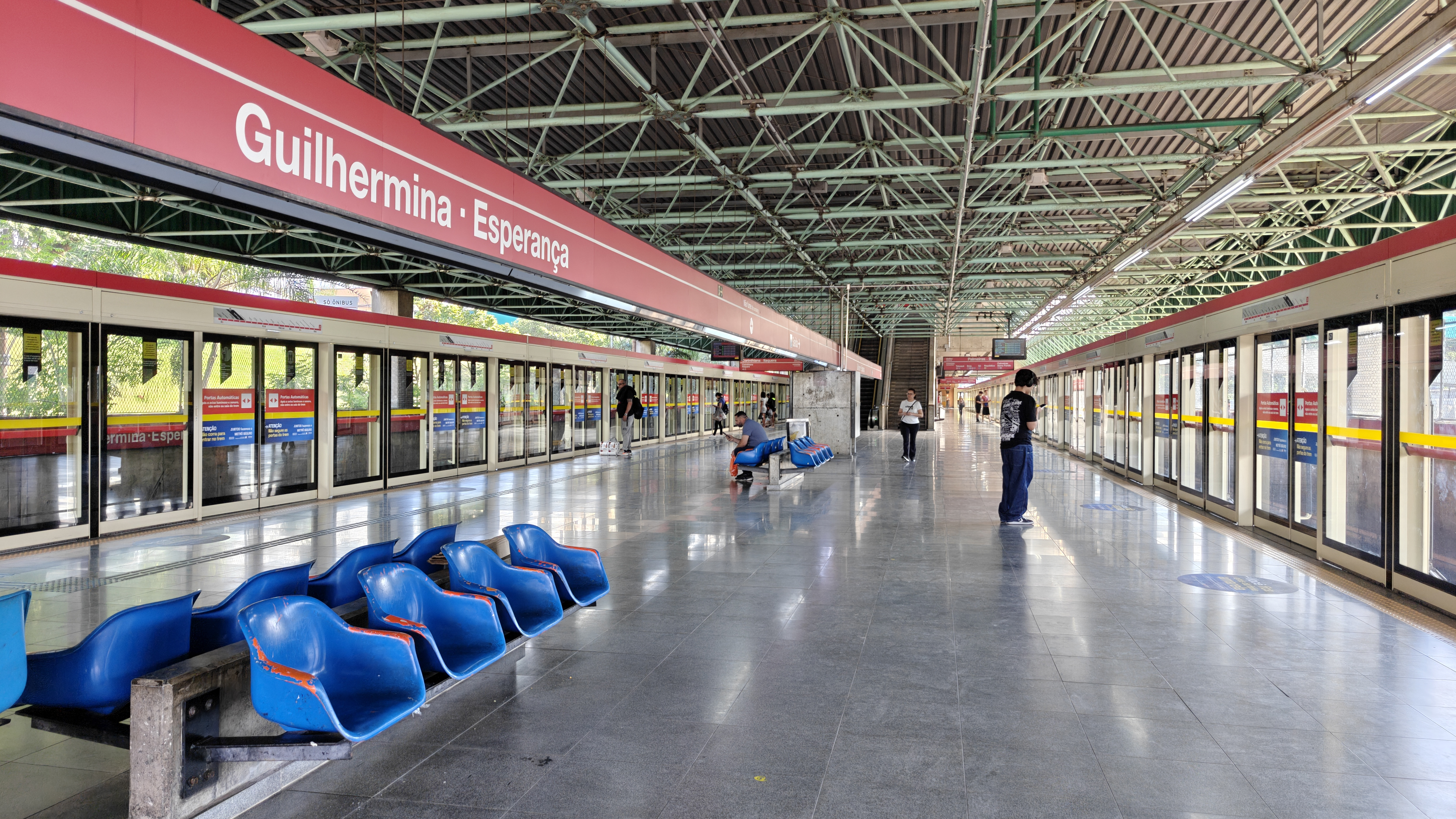

General information
- Location: São Paulo; Brazil
- Coordinates: 23°31′45″S 46°31′00″W
- Owner: Government of the State of São Paulo
- Operator: Companhia do Metropolitano de São Paulo
- Platforms: Island platform
- Connections: Access to SPTrans Bus Line

Construction
- Structure type: At-grade
- Accessible: y

Other information
- Station code: VPA

History
- Opened: August 27, 1988
- Former names: Rincão; Vila Esperança

Passengers
- 21,000/business day

Services
Preceding station	São Paulo Metro	Following station
Vila Matilde towards Palmeiras–Barra Funda	Line 3	Patriarca-Vila Ré towards Corinthians-Itaquera
Track layout
Location

Guilhermina–Esperança is a station on Line 3 (Red) of the São Paulo Metro.

== SPTrans Lines ==
The following SPTrans bus routes can be accessed. Passengers may use a Bilhete Único card for transfer:

Line
2717/10
2720/10
2720/31
2722/10
2722/31
3737/10
3737/31
3737/41
3790/10
