= Patriarca =

Patriarca may refer to:

- Patriarca crime family, an Italian-American crime family based in New England
- Patriarca (São Paulo Metro), a São Paulo Metro station

== People with the surname ==
- Camilla Patriarca (born 1994), Italian rhythmic gymnast
- Raymond Patriarca, Jr. (born 1945), American mobster
