= Vila Matilde (São Paulo Metro) =

São Paulo Metro station

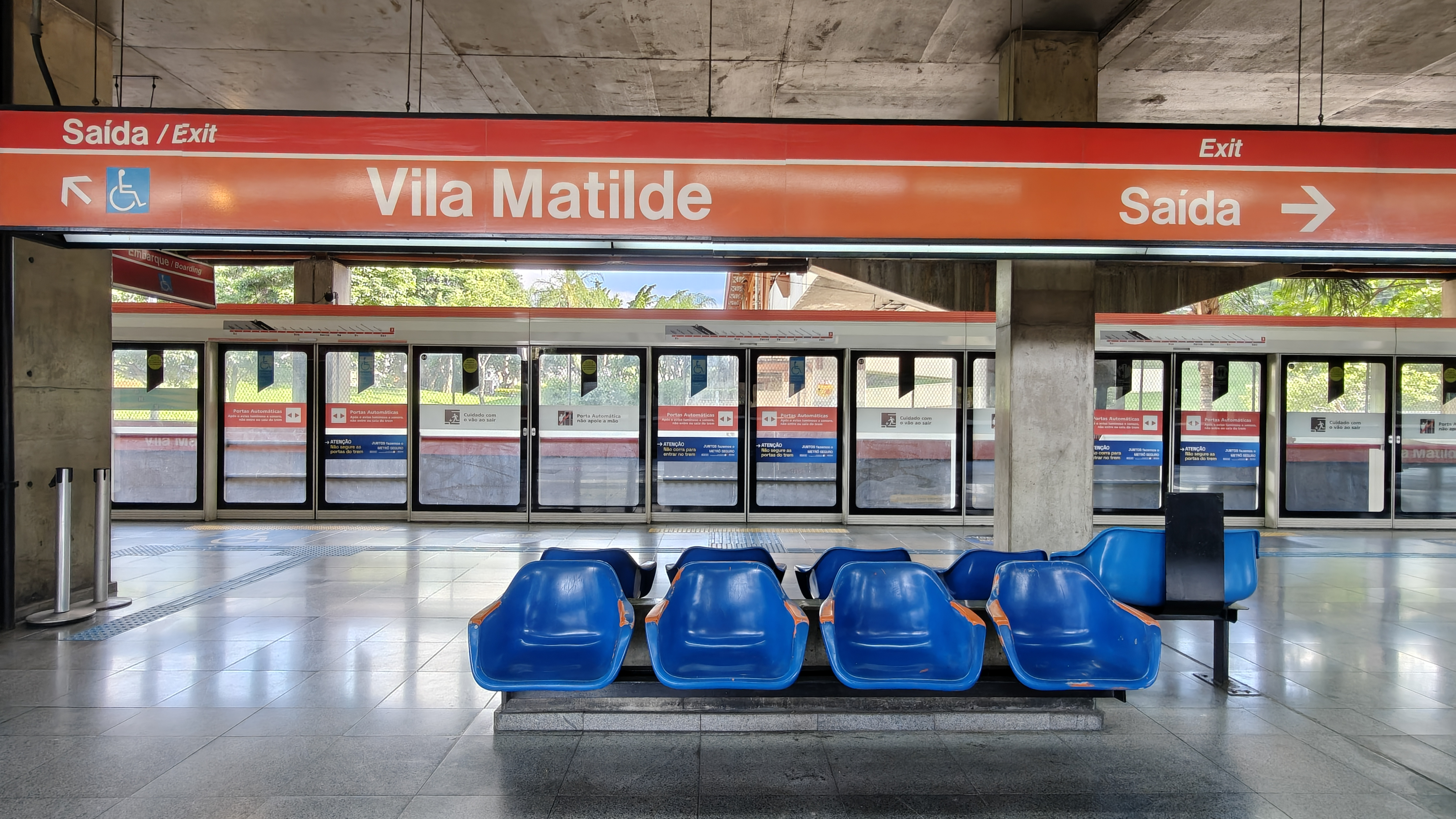

General information
- Location: São Paulo; Brazil
- Coordinates: 23°31′55″S 46°31′50″W
- Owner: Government of the State of São Paulo
- Operator: Companhia do Metropolitano de São Paulo
- Platforms: Island platforms
- Connections: Vila Matilde Bus Terminal

Construction
- Structure type: At-grade
- Accessible: y

Other information
- Station code: VTD

History
- Opened: August 27, 1988

Passengers
- 27,000/business day

Services
Preceding station	São Paulo Metro	Following station
Penha towards Palmeiras–Barra Funda	Line 3	Guilhermina-Esperança towards Corinthians-Itaquera
Track layout
Location

Vila Matilde is a station on Line 3 (Red) of the São Paulo Metro.

== SPTrans lines ==
The following SPTrans bus lines can be accessed. Passengers may use a Bilhete Único card for transfer:

Line
2706/10
2714/10
2719/10
273N/10
273N/41
273T/10
2770/10
3725/10
3725/41
3731/10
