= Ponte Pequena =

Coordinates: 23°31′28″S 46°37′56″W

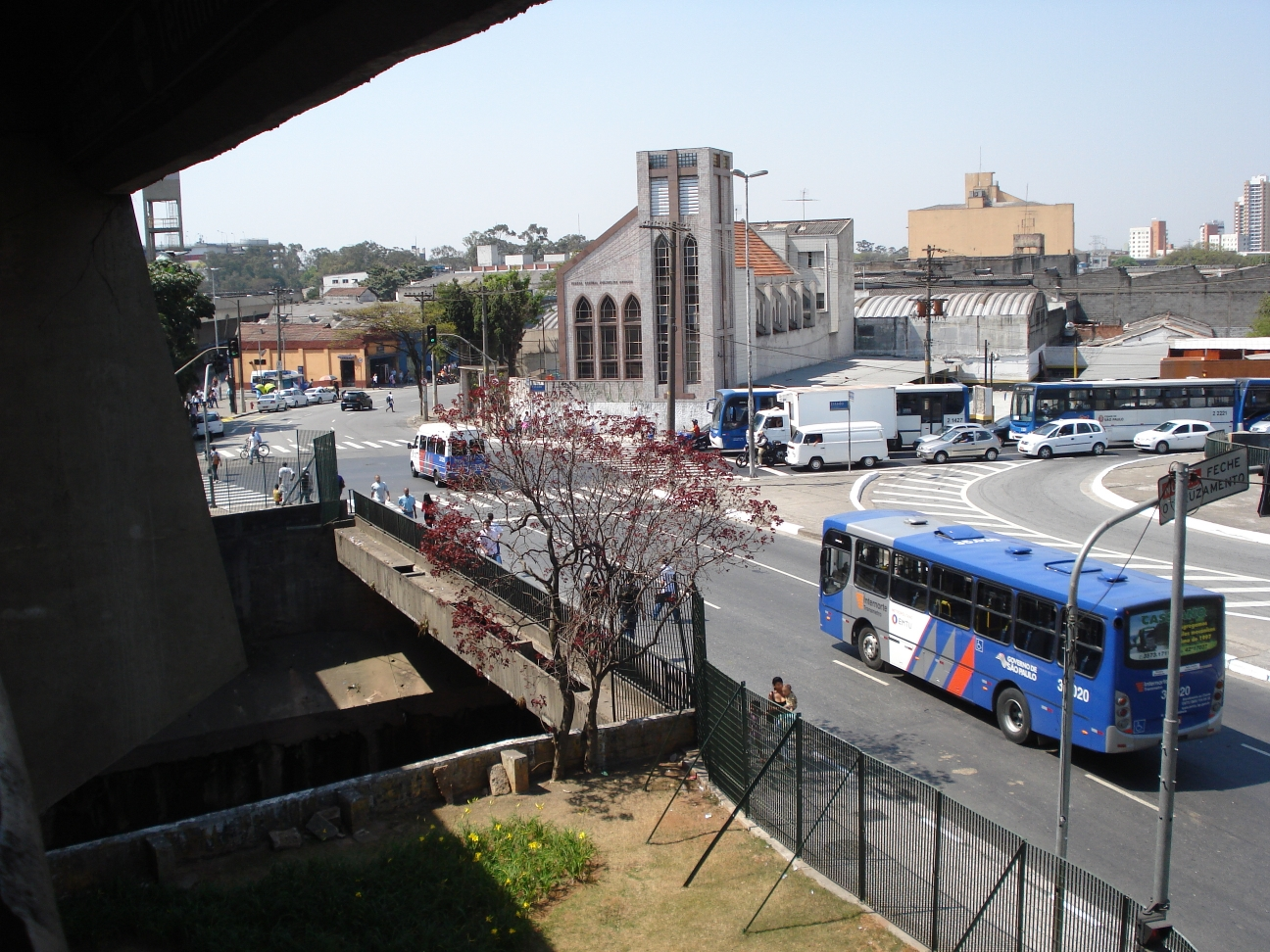

Ponte Pequena (Little Bridge in English) is a neighborhood in the Bom Retiro district of São Paulo, Brazil. It is located on the northern edge of the central zone of the city. The neighborhood is connect to São Paulo Metro Line 1 (Blue) at Armênia station. It is not a residential neighborhood and is mainly an access district that connects the northern area with the central area of São Paulo.

Ponte Pequena is a blighted area with a low population. Street prostitution, homelessness, and litter are problems in the neighborhood.
