= Vila Matilde (district of São Paulo) =

District of São Paulo, Brazil

Coordinates: 23.5387°S 46.5273°W

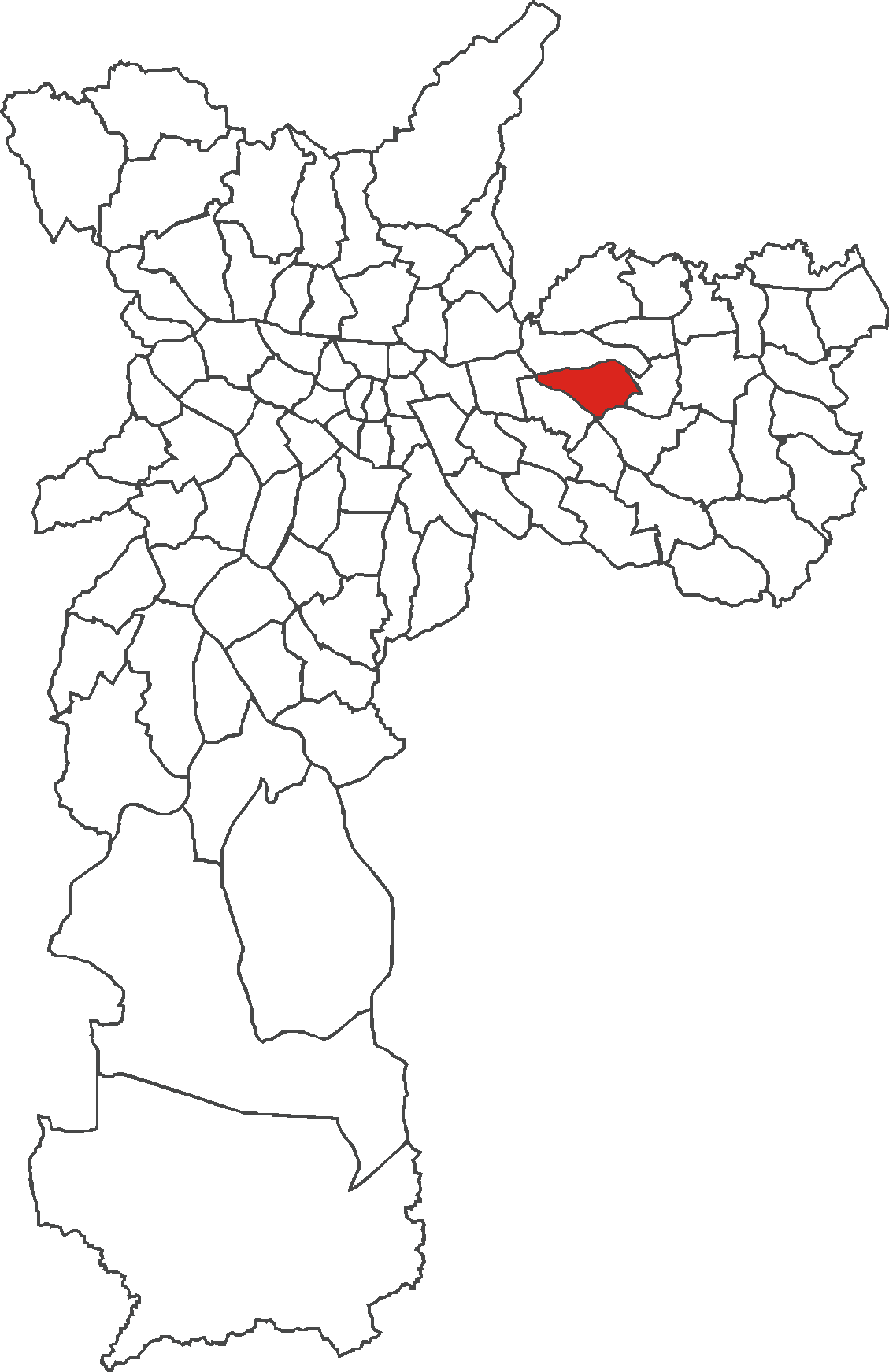
- District of the city of São Paulo
- Country: Brazil
- State: São Paulo
- Municipality: São Paulo
- Subprefecture: Penha

Area
  - Total: 8.90 km^{2} (3.44 sq mi)

Population (2007)
  - Total: 104,967
  - Density: 11,792/km^{2} (30,540/sq mi)
- Website: Subprefecture of Penha

Vila Matilde is one of 96 districts in the city of São Paulo, Brazil.
