= Penha (district of São Paulo) =

District of São Paulo, Brazil

Coordinates: 23°31′30.25″S 46°32′55.97″W

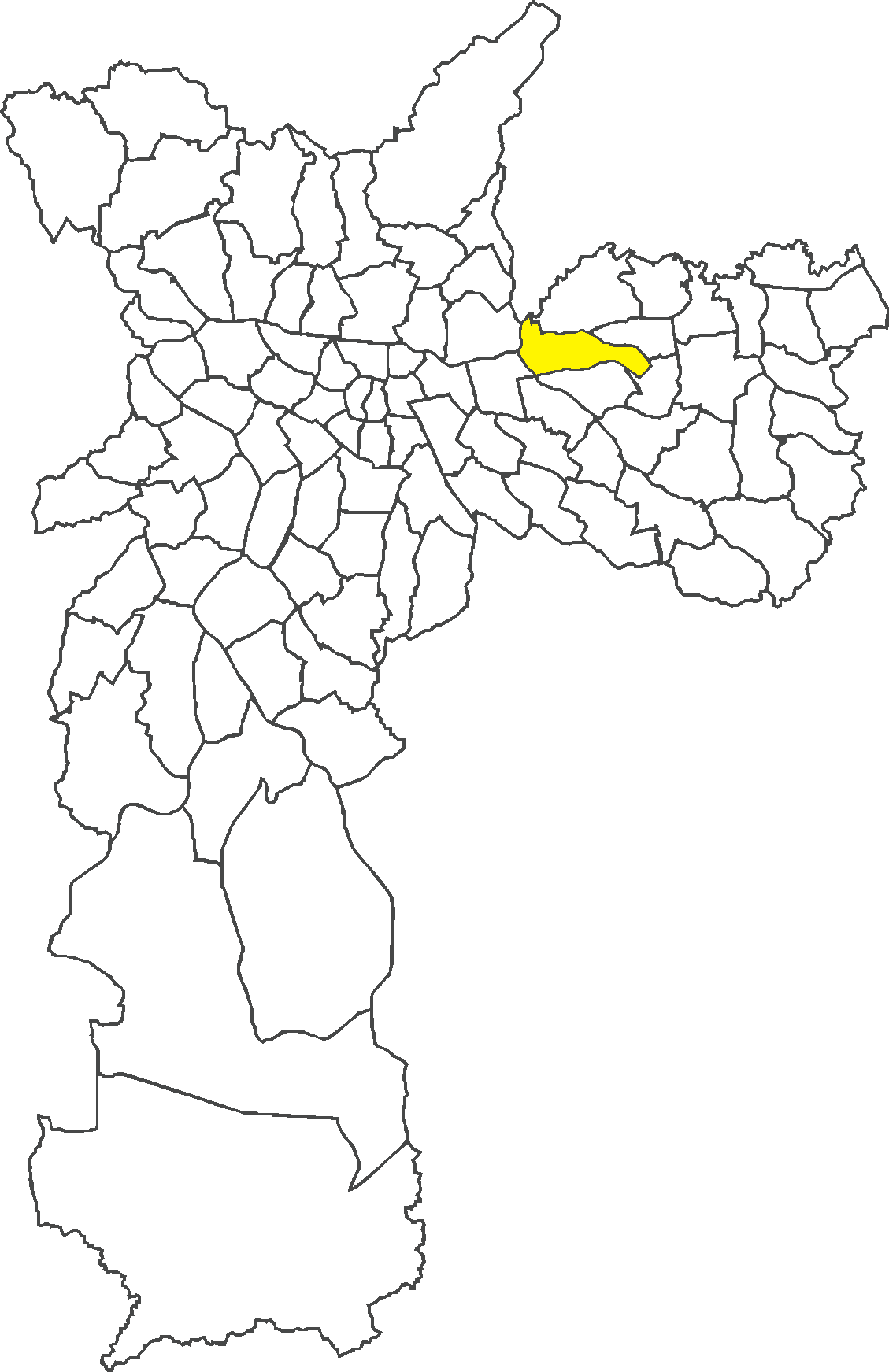
- Location in the city of São Paulo

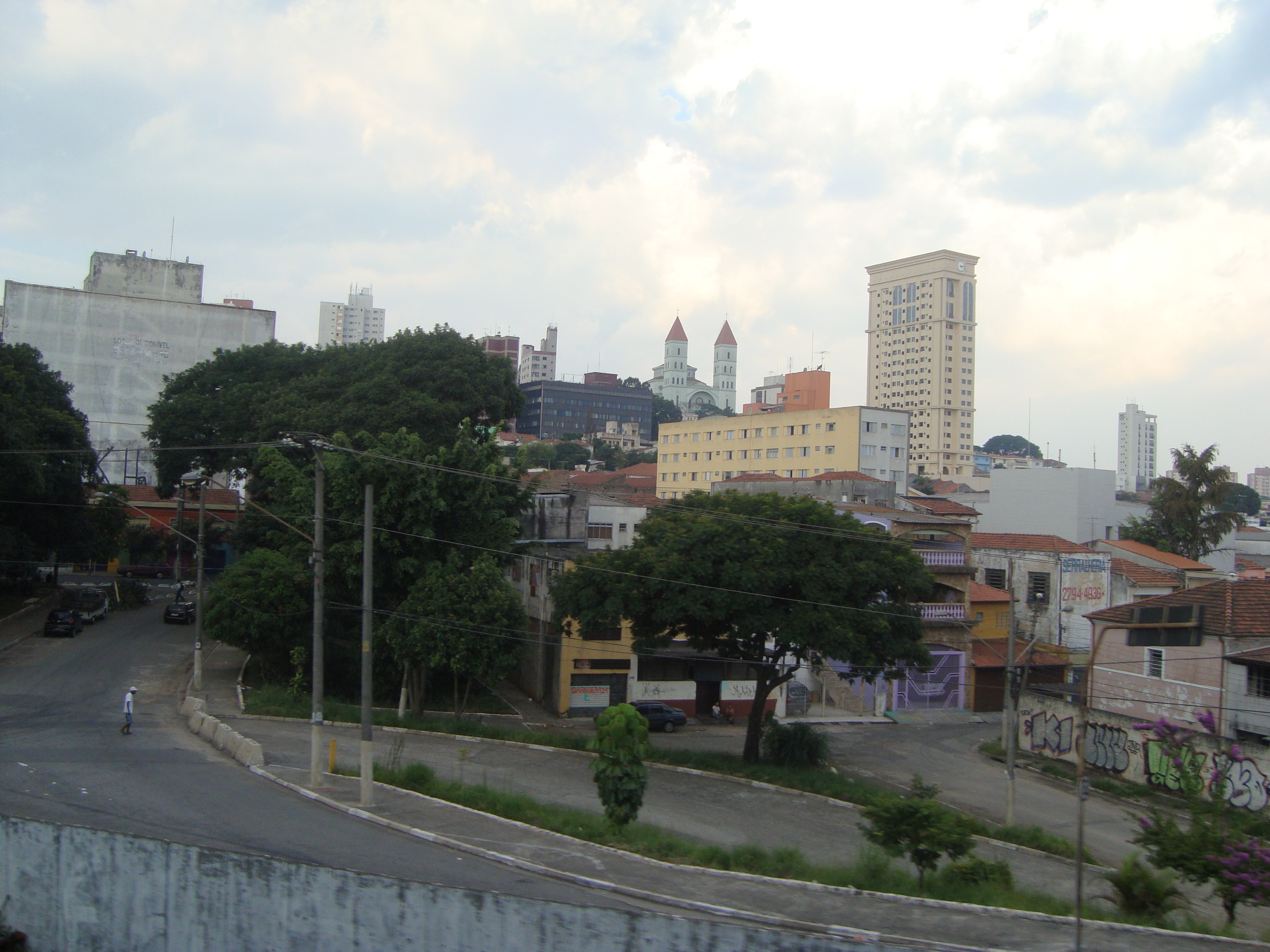
- Country: Brazil
- State: São Paulo
- City: São Paulo

Government
  - Type: Subprefecture
  - Subprefect: Cássio Freire Loschiavo

Population (2000)
  - Total: 124.292
- HDI: 0.865 –high
- Website: Subprefecture of Penha

Penha (Portuguese pronunciation: [ˈpeɲɐ]) is a district in the subprefecture of Penha of the city of São Paulo, Brazil. It is one of the oldest areas in São Paulo and is known because of the church Nossa Senhora da Penha, one of the oldest churches in the city.
