= Várzea do Carmo =

Former area in São Paulo, Brazil

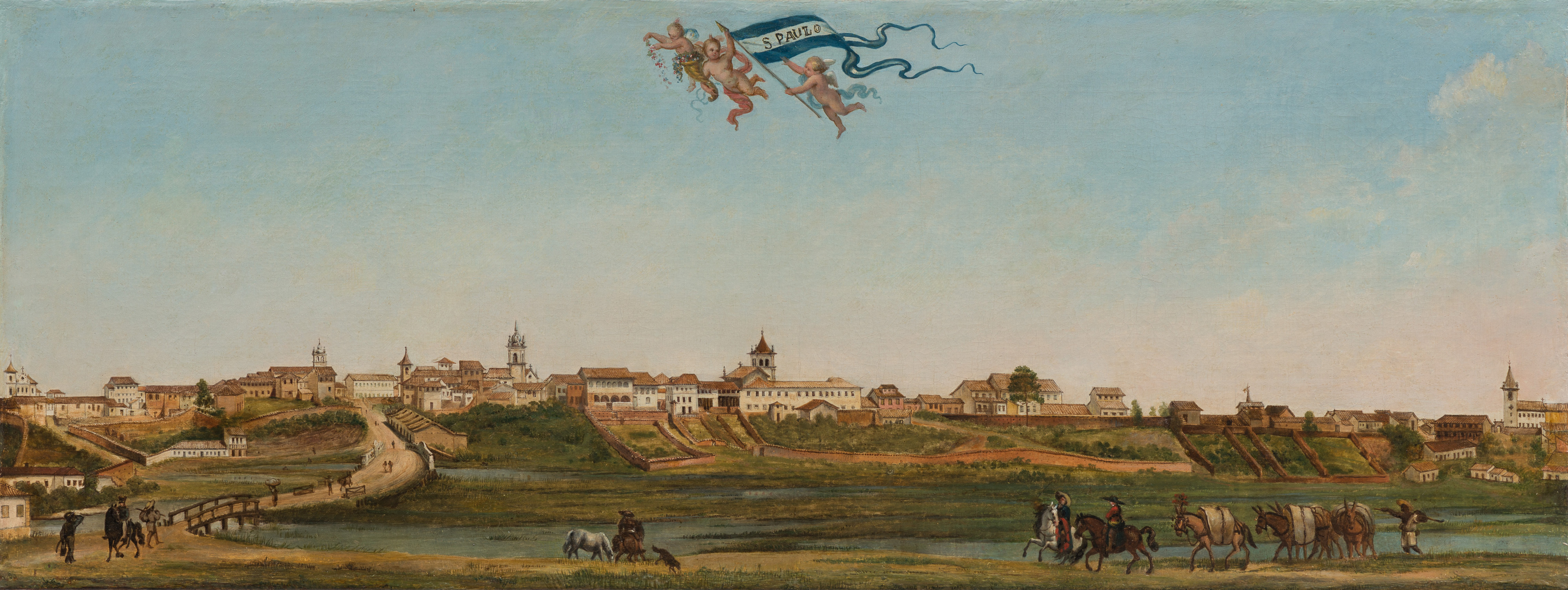
Várzea do Carmo painted by Arnaud Pallière.

Várzea do Carmo was the designation of one of the central areas of the city of São Paulo, adjacent to the Carmel Convent and frequently affected by the floods of the Tamanduateí River, formerly known as Piratininga. In 1821, Major Pedro Arbues Moreira submitted to the government a proposal to drain the Várzea do Carmo by opening a 40-meter-wide canal; the work was not carried out as it was too expensive. Many improvements were made to the site during the presidencies of Vicente Pires da Mota and João Teodoro Xavier, including the change in the course of the Tamanduateí River.

The complete sanitation and recovery of Várzea do Carmo was a slow process. After the canalization of the river, which was completed in the 1920s, the name was disused and today the area is equivalent to Dom Pedro II Park. On April 14, 1895, at Várzea do Carmo, a soccer match was played between Englishmen and Anglo-Brazilians, formed by employees of the Gas Company and the São Paulo Railway. The match, considered to be the first soccer event in the country, ended in a 4–2 victory for the São Paulo Railway.

== History ==
The area was called Várzea do Carmo because it was flooded by the Tamanduateí and Carmo rivers. The recurrent flooding became a problem for the population, as it was responsible for spreading diseases due to the unhealthy conditions. In 1810, in order to solve the issue, a ditch was built in the center of Várzea do Carmo.

In 1822, while visiting the city of São Paulo, the French botanist Augustin Saint-Hilaire characterized the Várzea de Carmo as a "plain without accidents that presents a charming alternative of creeping pastures and low scrubland [...] In the parts where there is more water, the soil is interspersed with mounds covered with thick tufts of grass." Flooding lasted until 1849, when the first works to straighten the Tamanduateí began, signed by the engineer Carlos Bresser. As the work began, the area lost its seven turns and became a road called Rua de Baixo (English: Lower Street), since it was located in the lower part of the city. In 1865, the street was renamed 25 de Março, in honor of the first constitution issued by the Empire on March 25, 1824.

During the administration of João Teodoro, President of the Province between 1872 and 1875, the first stretch of the river was canalized in order to create a straight channel in the area between Brás and Luz. He was also responsible for laying out the gardens and establishing the Ilha dos Amores (English: Love Island). In 1880, the government discussed a plan to "beautify" the Várzea do Carmo, as well as looking for new solutions to the constant flooding that still affected the population of the region.

In 1910, a plan to build a park with the collaboration of the private sector, the state and municipal authorities was approved. The site was chosen by the French architect Joseph-Antoine Bouvard, head of the landscaping and streetscape services in Paris. The project was approved in 1914 and delivered to the population in 1922. The Várzea do Carmo disappeared and the Dom Pedro II Park emerged. In 1924, supporting the importance and the idea of the government of São Paulo to transform the region, the Palácio das Indústrias (English: Palace of Industries) was inaugurated. At the end of the 1950s, the park's design was altered and included five viaducts and the paving of Avenida do Estado (State Avenue) on the Tamanduateí route.

== Companhia Parque da Várzea do Carmo ==
Companhia Mêcanica, which had canalized a large part of the Tamanduateí River, received a proposal from the City Hall to carry out the urbanization of Várzea do Carmo. As the Municipal Treasury had no resources, Mayor Washington Luís Pereira de Sousa suggested paying for the service with the remaining land that belonged to the City Hall. The Companhia Mecânica considered it unprofitable to exchange land for services and gave up.

Through the Companhia Parque da Várzea do Carmo, created by the Banco Português do Brasil in the 1920s to sanitize the floodplains, the region of Várzea do Carmo was cleaned up. The project was inaugurated in 1922 and resulted in the Dom Pedro II Park. Consequently, the properties in the area increased in value. Before the work was completed, the company plotted out the area and offered it to sale.

== See also ==
- Historic Center of São Paulo
- Central Zone of São Paulo
