= Catavento Museum =

Interactive science museum in São Paulo, Brazil

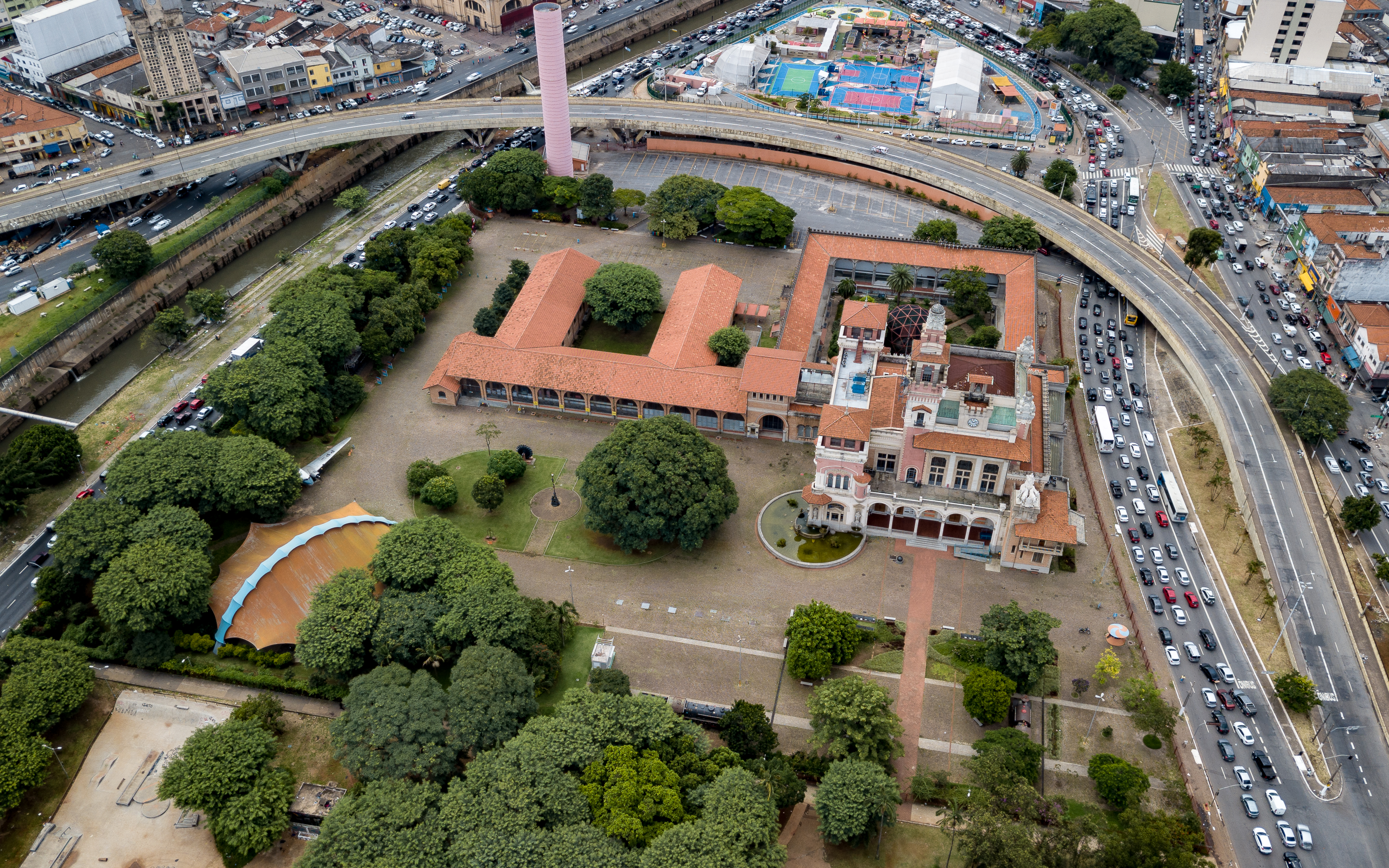

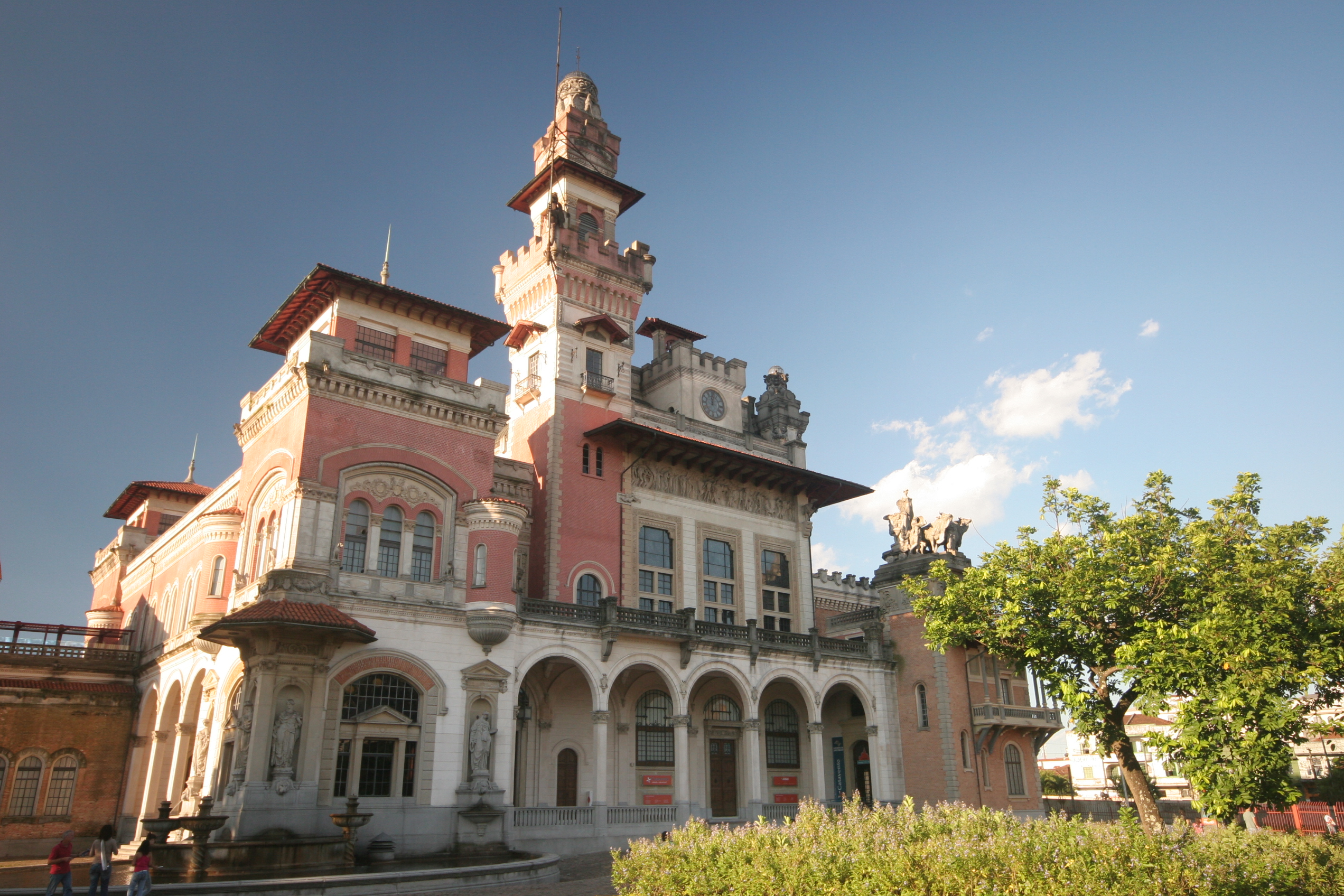
- Established: 26 March 2009
- Location: São Paulo, Brazil
- Coordinates: 23°32′39″S 46°37′41″W
- Visitors: 5,505,949 (2020)
- Website: museucatavento.org.br

The Catavento Museum is an interactive museum, inaugurated in 2009. It is dedicated to science and its dissemination, and is located in the Palácio das Indústrias ("Palace of the Industries"), in São Paulo, Brazil. The 12,000 square meter space is divided into 4 sections: "Universo" ("Universe"),"Vida" ("Life"), "Engenho" ("Ingenuity") and "Sociedade" ("Society") and has more than 250 installations. Aimed at young audiences, it was founded by the state secretariats of culture and education, with an investment of 20 million reais after 14 months of construction.

Although the museum began operating in 2009, the São Paulo City Hall had been discussing its creation since 2005, when it sent bill 469/2005 to the Municipal Chamber to authorize the Executive to establish the Catavento Foundation. The bill was only approved and transformed into law 14.130 in 2006, after a year of processing and alteration of the original text by politician Chico Macena, who defended the creation of the Catavento Foundation to create and manage the Children's Museum and not just a center for the development of children and adolescents.

== History ==
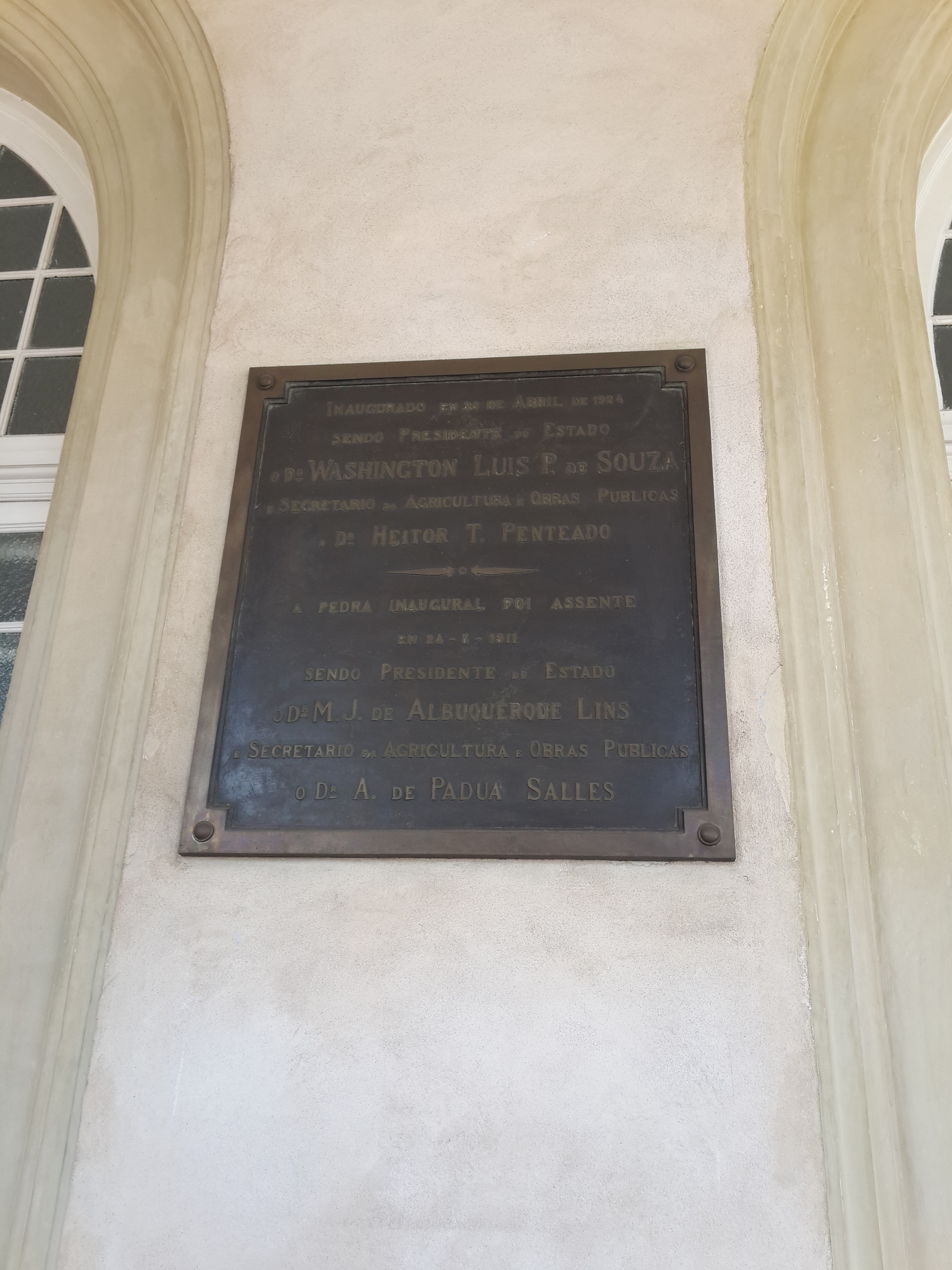
Inauguration plaque of the Palace of Industries.

The Palácio das Indústrias was built from 1911 to 1924, when the city of São Paulo had less than 1 million inhabitants. It was planned as the Palace of Industries, but the space also housed the exhibition of agriculture and livestock. Between 1947 and 1968, the building was the seat of the Legislative Assembly of São Paulo.

In 1992, the then-mayor Luiza Erundina transferred the seat of the municipal government to the palace. In 2004, after Marta Suplicy moved her office to the Patriarca Building, on the Viaduto do Chá, the palace was abandoned, and the bars from the fence surrounding the property were stolen. The area became known as the "Gaza Strip". The inauguration of Catavento revitalized the site. Due to the rapid growth of São Paulo, the Palácio das Indústrias, intended to be a place for exhibits, also had other uses such as: police station, legislative assembly, and headquarters of the São Paulo City Hall. In 2009, the building returned to its original purpose, exhibitions, by hosting the Catavento Cultural and Educational Center.

The São Vito and Mercúrio buildings, which once housed 800 families in poor condition, were emptied in February 2009. The buildings erected in the 1950s were demolished between 2010 and 2011. In 2014, the donation of the 9.2 thousand square meters area took place, sanctioned by former mayor Fernando Haddad (PT) and was published in the Official Gazette of the municipality in July of the same year. The bill was approved by the City Council in June, three years after being sent by the city to the Legislative. Originally, the measure was part of a revitalization plan for the central region of the capital, including the Dom Pedro II Park. The land was ceded to SESC.

=== Current state ===
The Catavento Museum inaugurated in February 2017 the "Sala Dinos do Brasil" ("Dinosaurs of Brazil Room"), which with the help of virtual reality glasses, takes the visitor on a journey to the Triassic and Cretaceous periods of Brazil, with the dinosaurs that inhabited this territory. According to paleontologist Luiz Anelli, the territory once had deserts and dinosaurs that spread across several regions such as Minas Gerais, Rio Grande do Sul, Mato Grosso and São Paulo. Highlights for the dinosaurs that inhabited the Triângulo Mineiro - herbivores and approximately 15 meters high - are the Uberaba titans and the Abelisaurus. To digitally recreate the places where the dinosaurs lived and simulate some behaviors they possessed, the museum relied on the consultancy of Luiz Eduardo Anelli, professor of paleontology at the Institute of Geosciences of the University of São Paulo (IGC-USP), and on the reconstruction of the dinosaurs, made by paleoartist Rodolfo Nogueira.

Started in June 2016, the restoration of the Catavento façade had an investment of R$ 1.2 million made available by the Diffuse Interests Fund (FID). About 70 architectural elements were recovered, including windows, pilasters, sculptures and the tower bell.

== Structure ==
=== Architecture ===
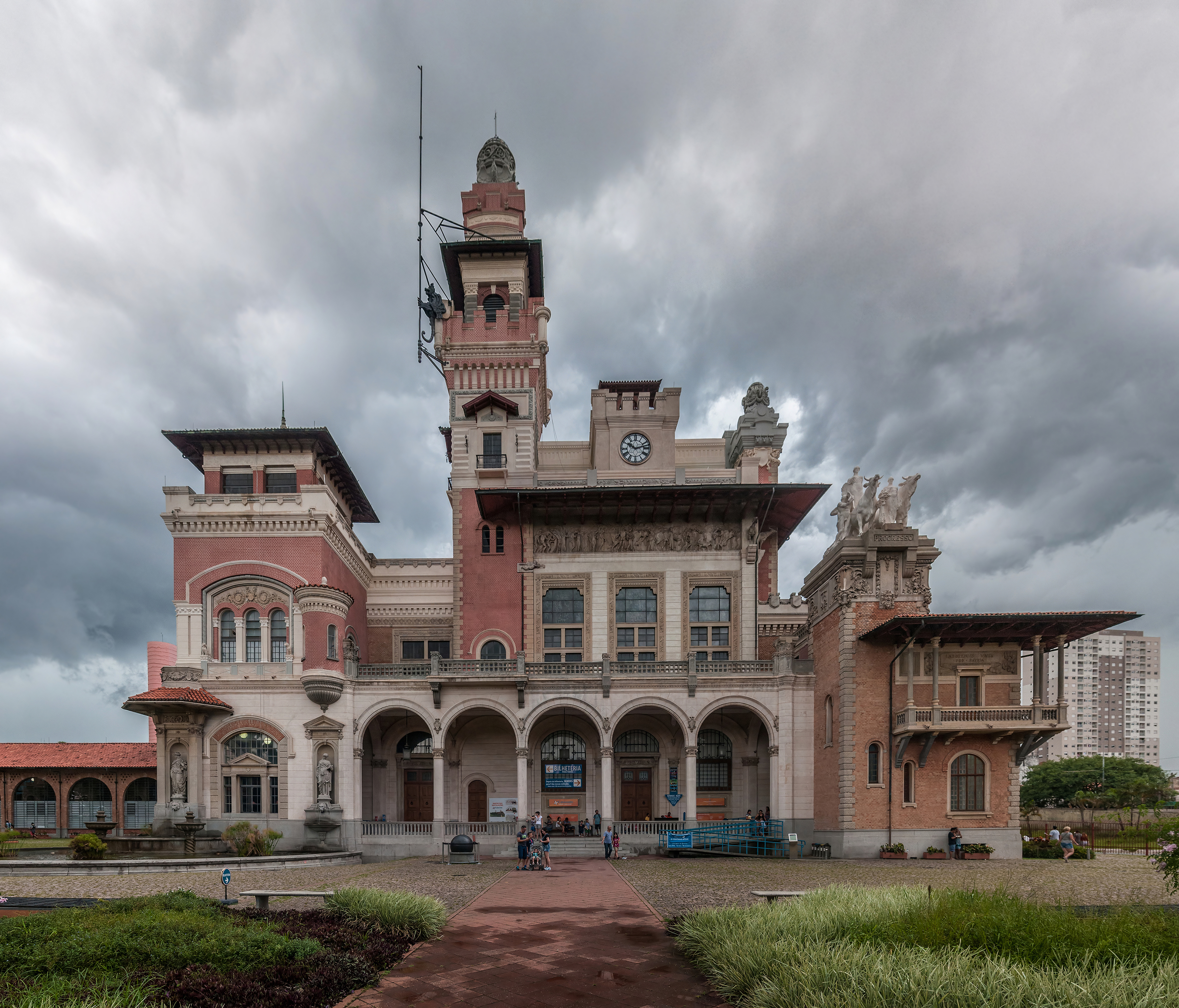
Palácio das Indústrias.

Erected by the office of Ramos de Azevedo, also in charge of the Municipal Theater, the palace displays an imported metal structure in its main structure. It has exposed brick as the main finish and has numerous decorative elements, some linked to livestock farming, such as bulls, and others not, such as dogs, and arrowheads on various ridges of the wall, a garden surrounding the main building and annexes, and the three floors of the building that occupy the center of the site: basement, first floor and upper floor. The responsible architect was Domiziano Rossi.

The complex bears similarities to the Castello Mackenzie, a palace located in Genoa, Italy.

=== External area ===
==== Patio ====
The outside of the museum also has numerous objects on display. There are replicas of carriages, parts of old mills, train wagons, locomotives and an old airplane. In addition, some war pieces such as anti-aircraft artillery cannons are on display. There is a large fountain with live fish, a butterfly garden and many trees. At the front entrance of the museum there is a granite sphere.

In the courtyard of the museum, stands a DC-3 model airplane (prefix PT-KUB), manufactured in 1936 by the Douglas Aircraft Company. It was used as a military freighter in the Second World War, being later acquired by VASP and adapted to the civilian use. It carried passengers and cargo on the Rio-São Paulo area hop until 1972. In 1974, VASP donated the aircraft to the Rondon Project. In 1979, it was restored by the Air Force and donated to the São Paulo Museum of Technology. To equip it, parts and components from three other aircraft were used, which were at Campo dos Afonsos, in Rio de Janeiro. In 2011, after the closure of the museum's activities, its collection was transferred to the Catavento Museum.

=== Internal area ===
In July 2015, the museum inaugurated an iron structure that houses different species of butterflies, such as the owl butterfly. More than 20 varieties of plants specific to each species of butterfly make up the space. The animals came from the Laerte Brittes de Oliveiras butterfly garden, in Diadema, ABC Region. In the butterfly garden, visitors learn about the different stages of the development of butterflies.

== Collection ==
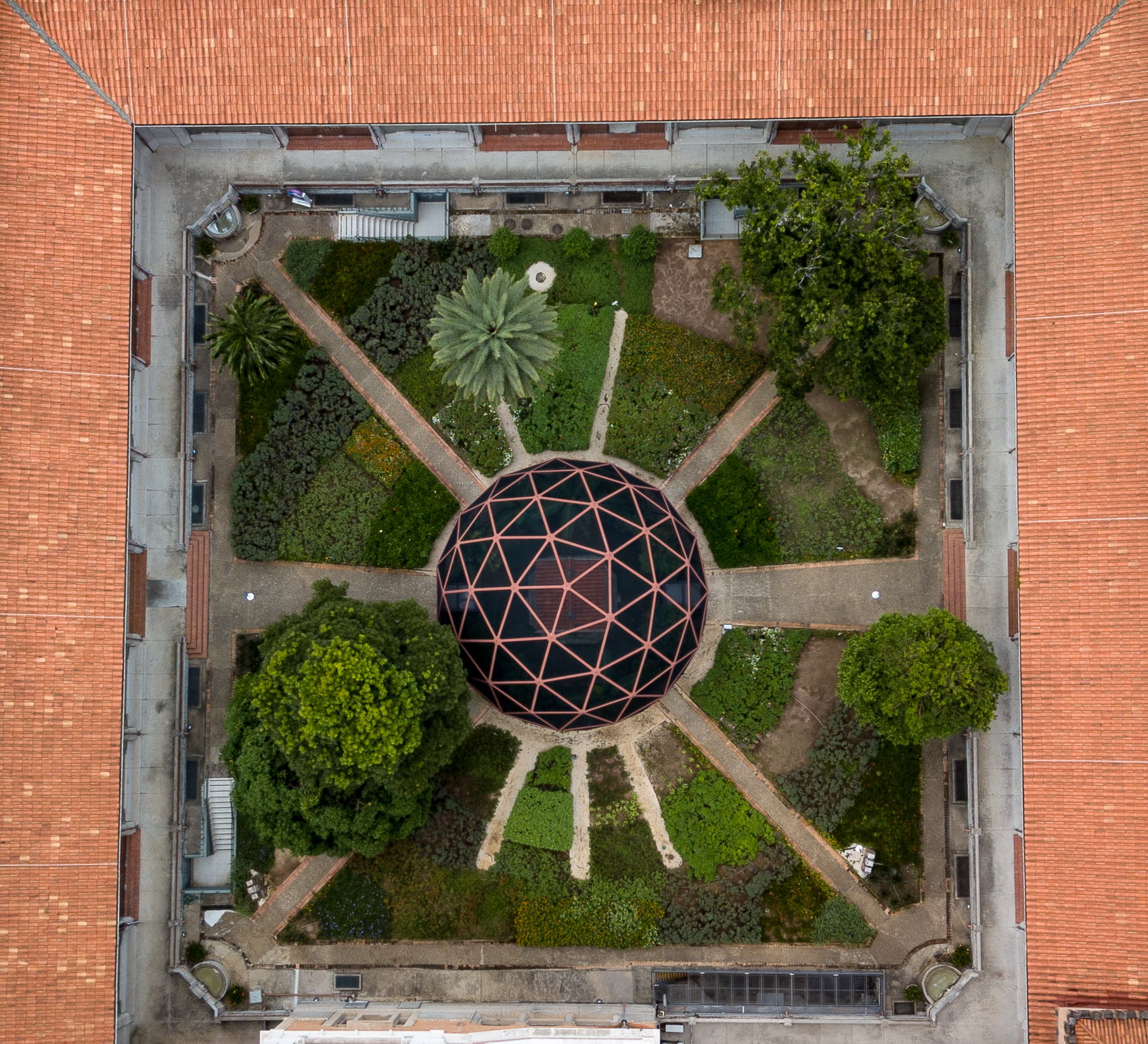
Aerial view of the butterfly garden

The museum's collection contains more than 250 installations, 187 of which are owned by the São Paulo Museum of Technology Foundation. The exhibits are distributed in four sections, namely: "Universo" ("Universe"),"Vida" ("Life"), "Engenho" ("Ingenuity") and "Sociedade" ("Society").

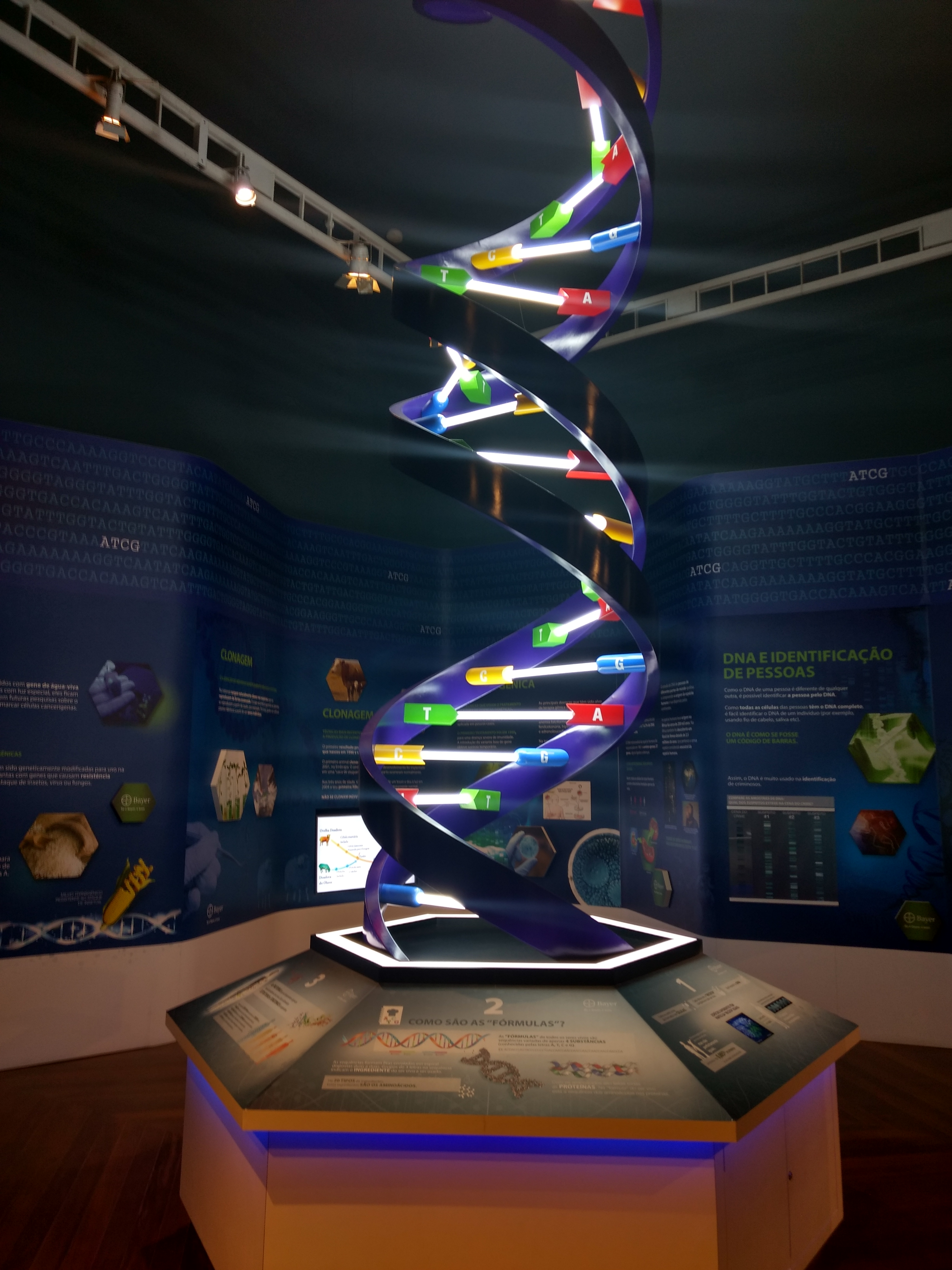
Structure of the DNA.

The "Universo" section has numerous exhibition panels that represent the knowledge of space as it is currently known by humanity. The interaction is done through didactic films incorporated into painted or relief panels, and other artistic constructions that expose the core of the Sun and the Earth and provide information on the performance of stars. The works depict topics of the Solar System; Geology, space travel, landscapes and terrestrial reliefs, relying on audiovisual tools and containing a real meteorite.

The "Engenho" section is dedicated to human ingenuity, accumulating a rich and diverse set of interactive works, allowing the public an interactive proximity that further awakens the innate curiosity of human beings. The cultural apparatuses in their entirety are interactive and each has a specific knowledge function associated with a particular field of physics: Mechanics, optics, waves, thermodynamics and electromagnetism.

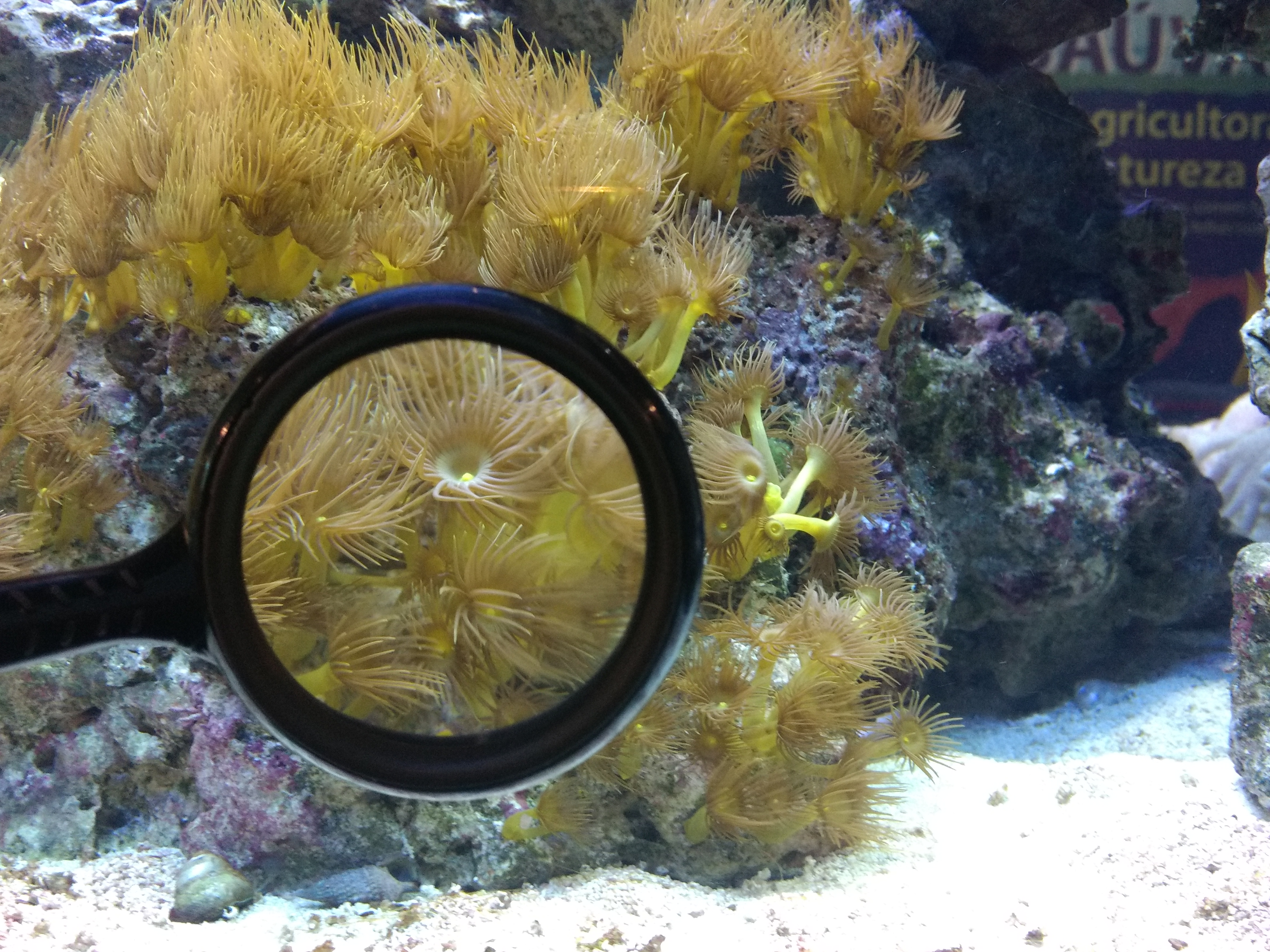
One of the museum's aquariums.

In the "Sociedade" section, the first topic is the environment and sustainability. It is possible to watch the 3D virtual tour of Rio de Janeiro and see some of the threatened animals on the panels scattered around the place. The Nanotechnology space, with games related to the theme, has monitors that lead a journey through the new findings of current robotics. Unlike the previous section, it is the monitors who make up the majority of this space. The chemical experiment space, the game show with questions about history, and the rock climbing space with interventions by great thinkers are also highlights. And, if visitors are over 13, the tour can be completed with a walk through the Prevention ("Prevenção") room, which warns of the dangers of drugs and also the interactive lecture that illustrates the risks of unsafe sexual relations. It discusses abortion, shows the evils of alcohol and drug consumption and allows one to evaluate historical decisions, such as the dropping of atomic bombs on Japan by the United States in World War II.

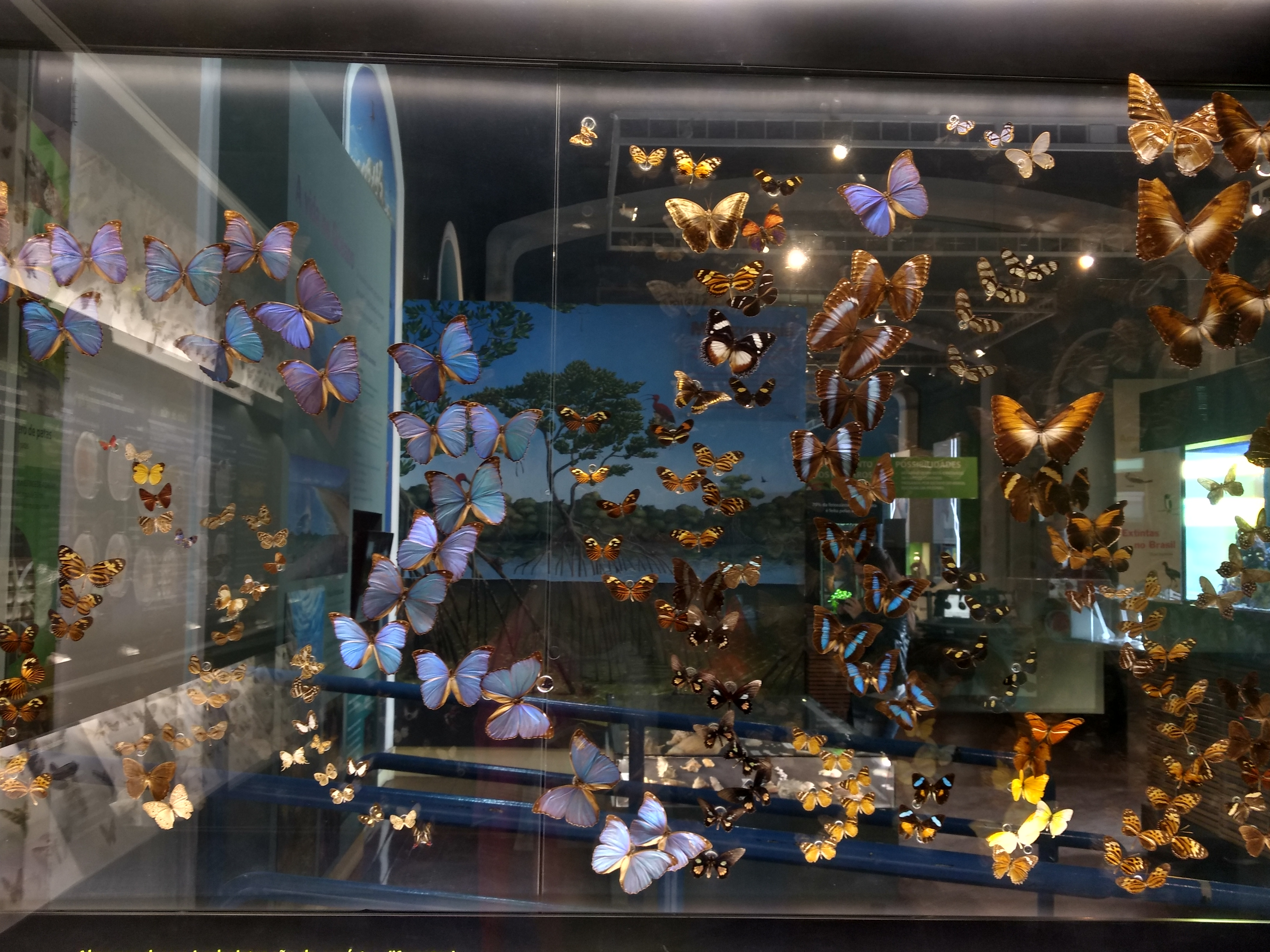
Butterfly garden.

The "Vida" section contains various areas:

- Biomes: Located at the entrance of the section, in this place one will find text panels, videos and images about the 6 biomes that make up Brazil: the Atlantic Forest, Cerrado, Caatinga, Amazon rainforest, Pantanal and Pampas.
- Tree of life: Portrays the theme of the common genesis of life and biological classification.
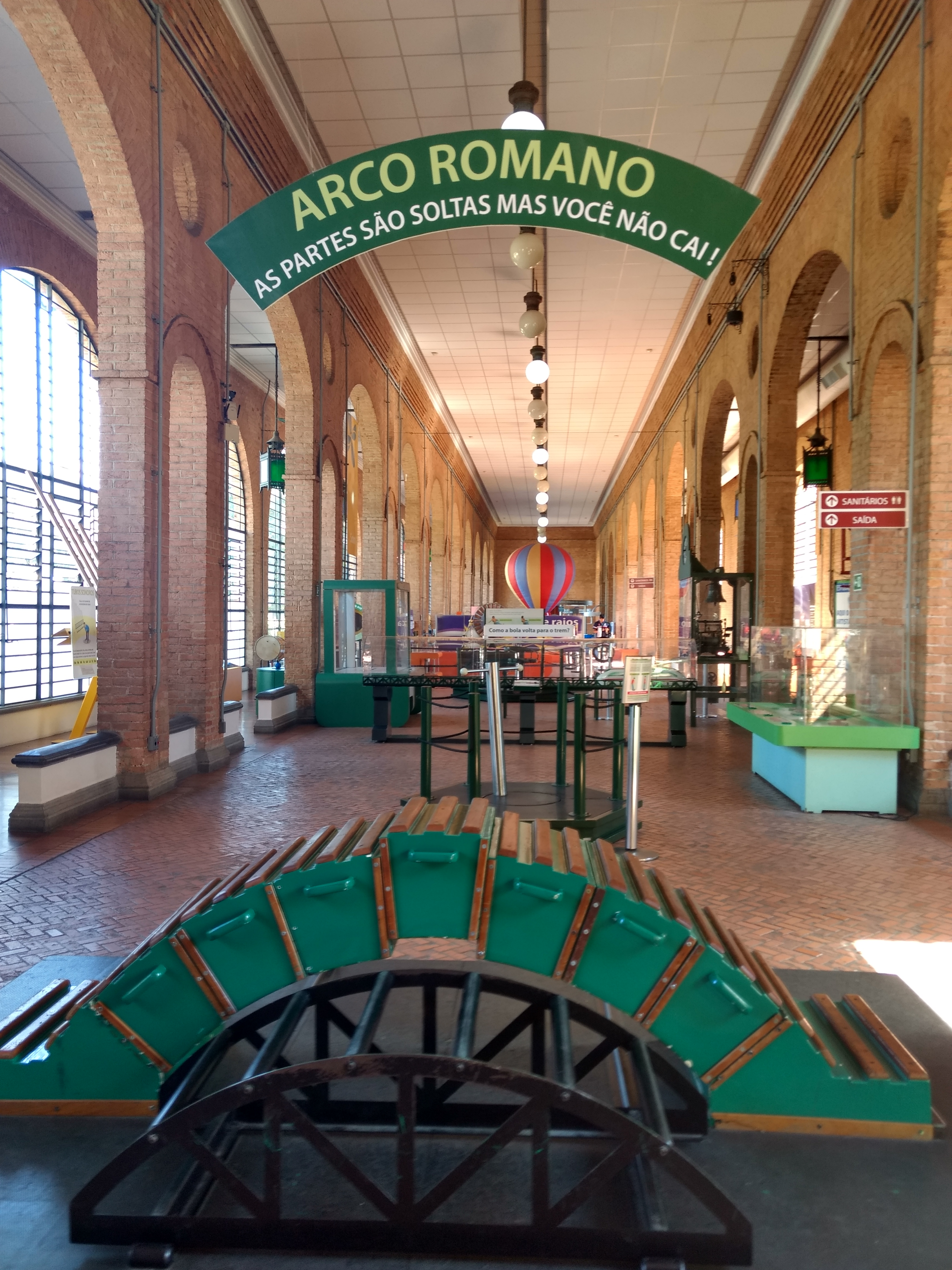
- Roman arch in the "Engenho" section.
  Insects: Organized into three groups of animals:
  - Stick insects: Has a vivarium containing them and texts highlighting the camouflage privilege their body structure and shape offer.
  - Ants: Has a model of an ant enlarged 100 times, next to a panel depicting the core of an anthill. It also plays a video of a few minutes showing the filling of an abandoned anthill with cement.
  - Butterflies: Contains a display with specimens of real taxidermied butterflies and moths, with information on some species, in addition to texts on mimicry, the life cycle of butterflies and moths, and some data on the silkworm.
- Life in the ocean: Features a painted panel on the wall with examples of the diversity of marine animals, depicting birds and mammals. There is a display with specimens of shells, the names of the groups of molluscs to which they belong, and more information, such as an indication of one of the largest shells in the world.
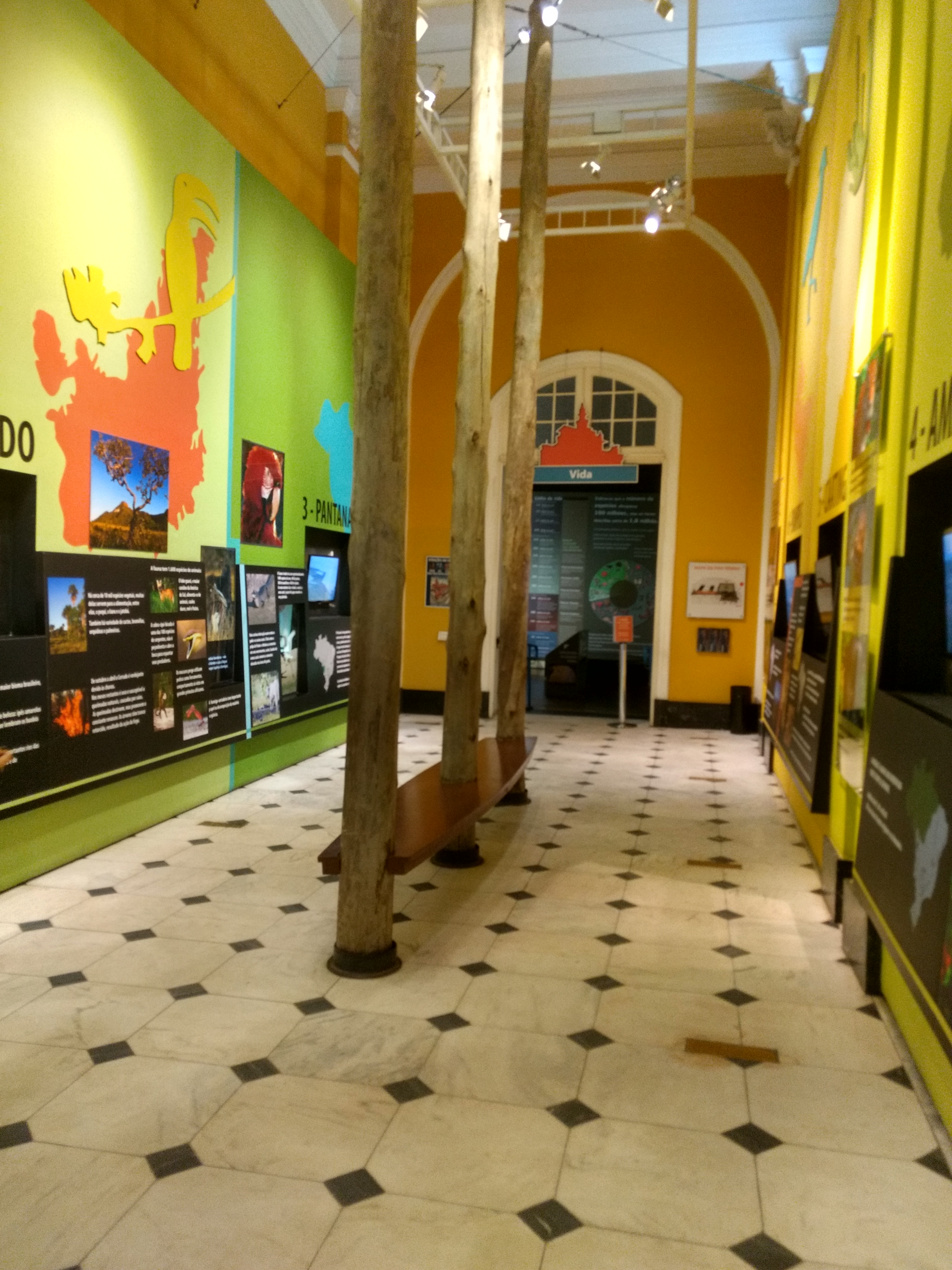
- "Birds of Brazil" in the "Vida" section.
  Marine aquariums: The large aquarium is located in the center of the visitors' circulation space. It contains live specimens of tropical fish and invertebrates such as the clownfish. Around the aquarium magnifying glasses are provided for visitors to observe the animals in more detail. The small aquarium has fewer species and is next to the "Do Veneno ao Remédio" ("From Poison to Medicine") area. This aquarium features a moray eel, a lionfish (poisonous specimen), among others.
- Photosynthesis: It shows the growth rings of trees and displays some textual explanations arranged on plates around the trunks.
- From Poison to Medicine: A panel on the wall shows, with texts and pictures, the importance of poison for animals and the possible production of medicines from these poisons. The "observation area" contains a table with signs showing animals such as scorpions, spiders and frogs, which can be observed in greater detail with the use of magnifying glasses. It also has a text panel on vertebrates. There is a wooden cabinet with glass doors, which has taxidermied snakes and lizards, including a snake displayed in a predatory position on a mouse.
- Birds of Brazil: An image with the scientific and common name of several species of Brazilian birds is displayed on the walls. In the central part of the "Vida" section, there are tables with computers and headphones where the public can listen to different bird songs.
- Evolution and Darwin: This area has models of skulls of ancestral species of hominids, with informative texts containing scientific names, in which era they lived and the contemporary human species, following a chronological order. There is also a panel of texts with data on the life and work of researcher Charles Darwin, who established the Theory of evolution of species; a life-size model of a specimen of the extinct saber-toothed tiger; a stage with an electronic and interactive display that makes it possible to carry out an exercise on natural selection; an arrangement of illustrations of various animals indicating which are the vertebrates and a display with models of skeletons of the upper limbs of various animal species, showing the similarity of the bones despite the different functions they can perform.
- Human body: The collection in this area was produced by the School of Medicine of the University of São Paulo. They are displayed in two different locations within the "Vida" section. Firstly, the human reproductive, cardiovascular, respiratory, digestive and neural systems are included in a two-storey room integrated into the main exhibition hall. The other systems are displayed in the main hall and the block is named "Virtual Man" ("Homem Virtual"). It offers information on muscles, bones, skin, sight and hearing.
- Cell and DNA: This section has a model of the interior of a cell, with its components (organelles, membrane and nucleus), in addition to a structure of about two meters high showing the structure of a DNA and containing texts and representations of viruses. There is also a large panel that brings data on the vaccine manufacturing process.

== See also ==
- Oceanographic Institute of the University of São Paulo
- Palácio das Indústrias
