= Expresso Tiradentes =

Bus rapid transit system of São Paulo

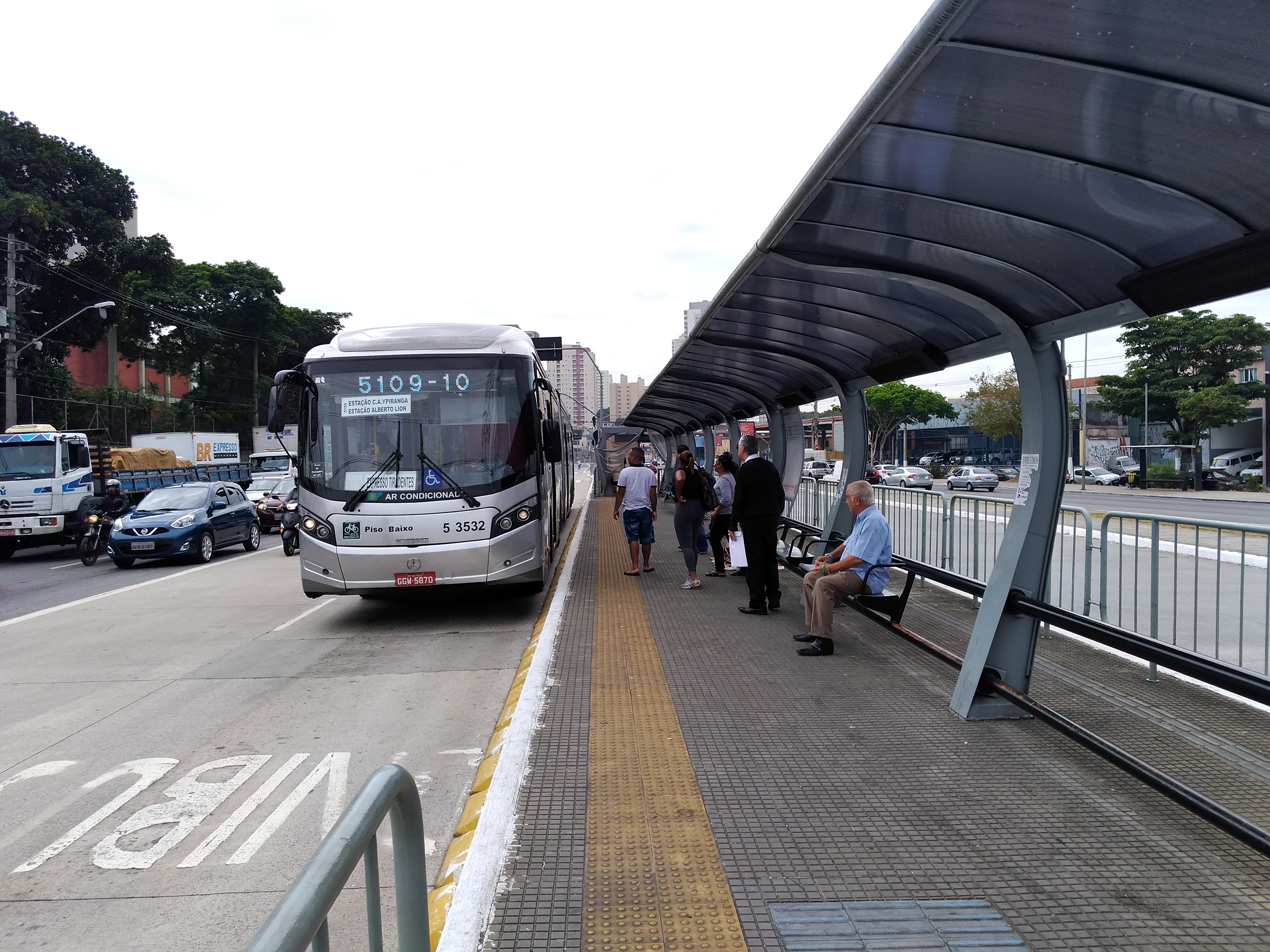

Overview
- Owner: SPTrans
- Locale: São Paulo, Brazil
- Transit type: Bus rapid transit
- Number of lines: 2 corridors
- Line number: 5105-10: Mercado – Sacomã; 5109-10: Mercado – Vila Prudente; 5110-10: Mercado – São Mateus; 5110-23: Mercado – Jardim Planalto
- Number of stations: 10
- Daily ridership: 87,000/business day

Operation
- Began operation: 8 March 2007 (Mercado – Sacomã); 11 March 2009 (Mercado – Vila Prudente)
- Operator: Via Sudeste
- Character: Elevated and at-grade

Technical
- System length: 8.2 km (5.1 mi)
- Average speed: 40 km/h (25 mph)
- Top speed: 50 km/h (31 mph)
System map
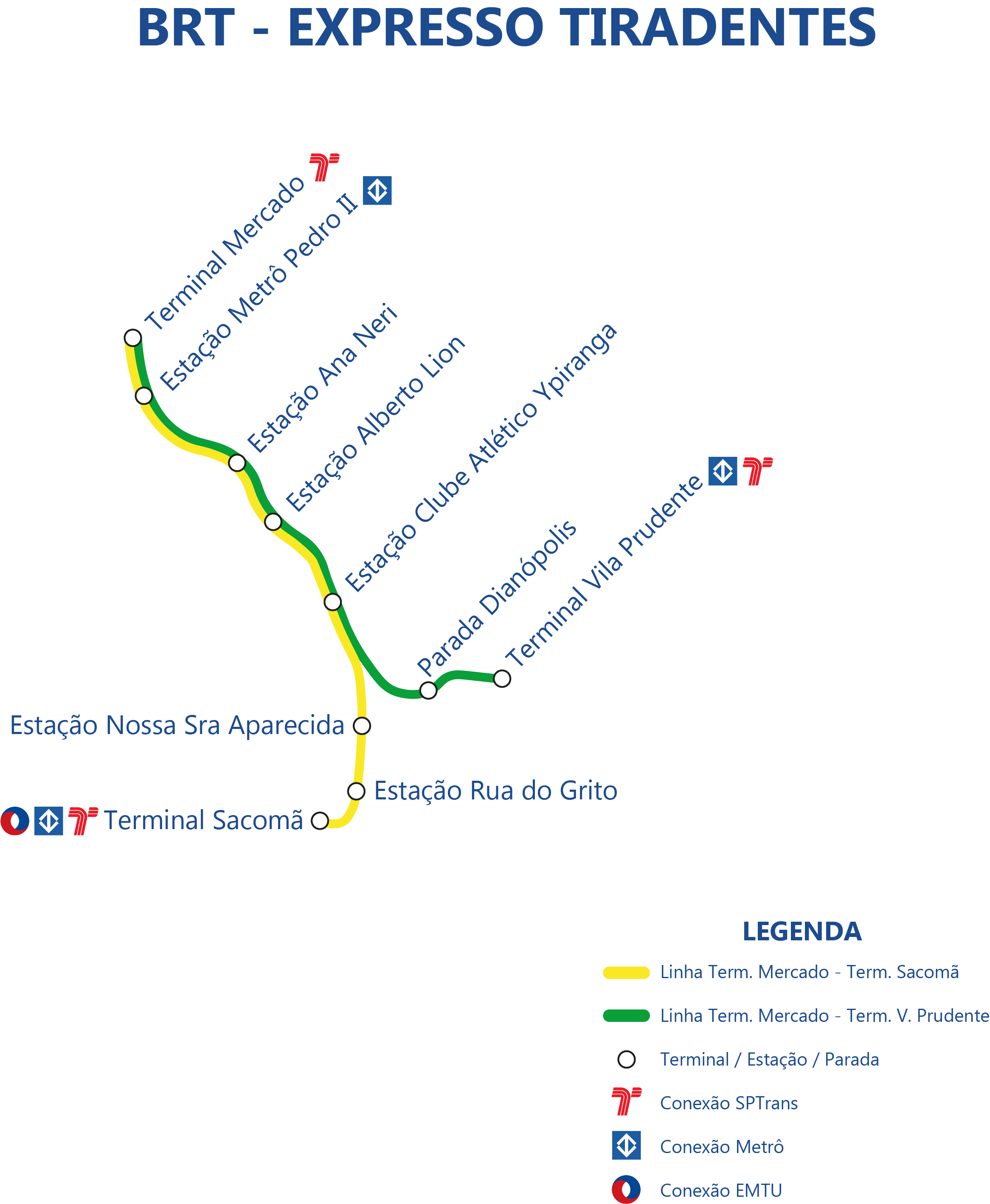

Expresso Tiradentes is the bus rapid transit (BRT) system in São Paulo, Brazil. It is a mid-capacity transportation system that began construction in mid- 1997, under the name of Fura-Fila. During the administration of mayor Marta Suplicy, in mid- 2001, the name was changed to Paulistão. The current goal of the system is to connect the neighborhood of Sacomã to Parque Dom Pedro II, in order to integrate with other forms of transportation for the residents of the extreme eastern part of the city, mainly Cidade Tiradentes. The stretch between Sacomã and Parque Dom Pedro II and the words Vila Prudente - Parque Dom Pedro II . On April 28, 2009, mayor Gilberto Kassab and governor José Serra announced an agreement to amend the project, now to be called Metrô Leve Expresso Tiradentes. The project cost was estimated at R$2.3 billion and was estimated to be completed (between Vila Prudente and Tiradentes) in 2012. For almost ten years, the BRT project of São Paulo has been postponed, and as a result, its original design has changed so that the current Expresso Tiradentes has lost virtually all the characteristics of a true BRT. An agreement between the mayor of São Paulo and the governor declared that the stretch between Vila Prudente and Tiradentes would be a monorail system.
