= Sacomã Terminal =

Bus station in São Paulo, Brazil

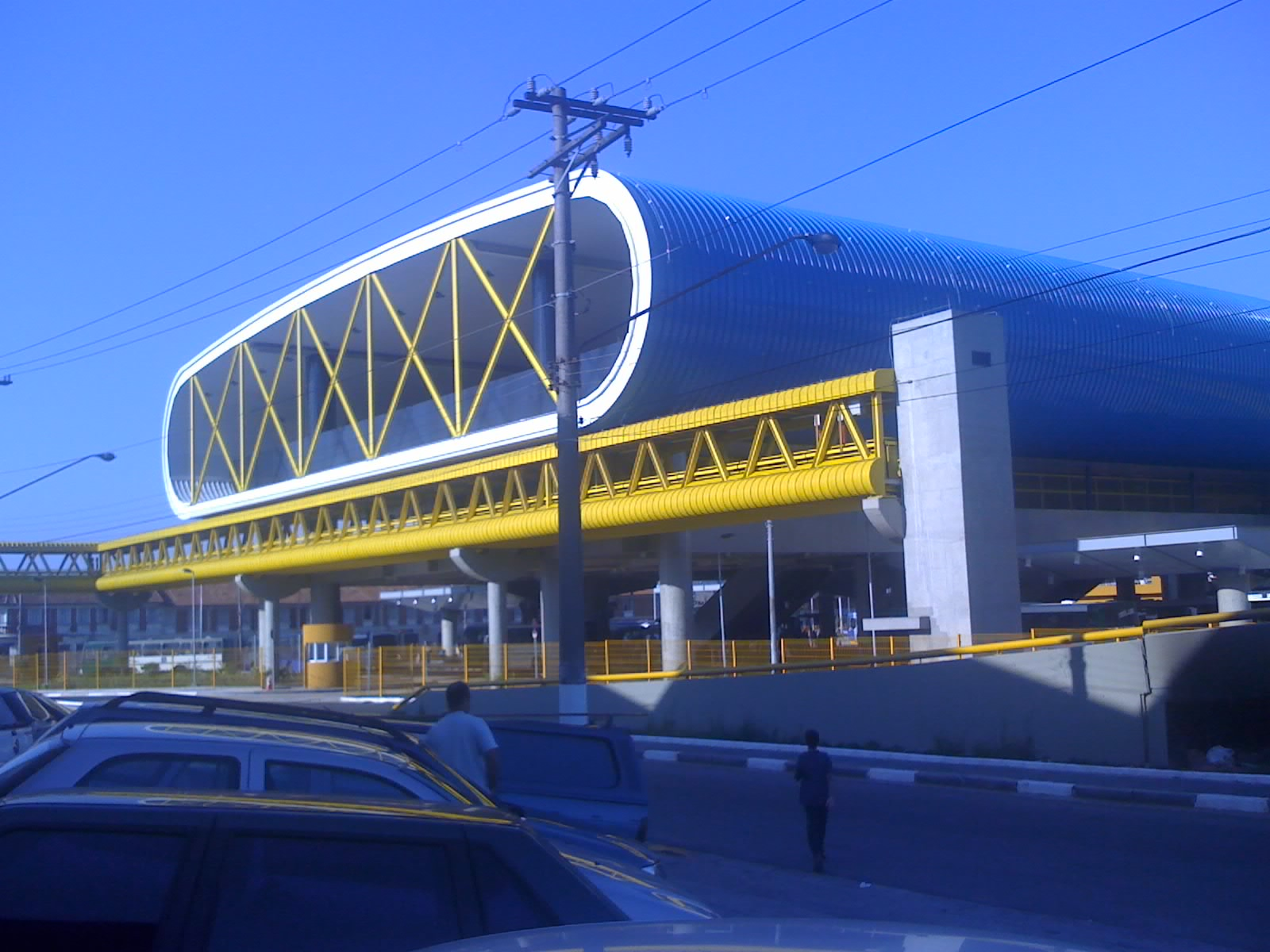

General information
- Location: R. Bom Pastor, 3000; Ipiranga; Brazil
- Coordinates: 23°36′11″S 46°36′10″W
- Owner: Government of the City of São Paulo
- Operator: SPTrans; EMTU
- Line: Expresso Tiradentes
- Platforms: 6 for local and intercity buses 1 island platform for BRT

Construction
- Platform levels: 3

History
- Opened: 8 March 2007
Location

Sacomã Terminal is a large bus terminal in São Paulo, Brazil. Together with the Mercado, Vila Prudente, and Cidade Tiradentes Terminals it forms the Expresso Tiradentes, a corridor exclusively used by buses. The Sacomã Metro station is located near the complex. Before the opening of the terminal, much of the municipal lines (from SPTrans) had a terminus in Parque Dom Pedro II Terminal, in downtown São Paulo.

The station has 3 levels.

- Top floor: Expresso Tiradentes station
- Mezzanine: ticketing office, ATMs, cafeteria, operational control center, health and other services. Access to the Sacomã Metro Station is through a walkway.
- Ground floor: Access to city buses (platforms 1, 2, 3 and 4) and intercity buses (platforms 5 and 6).
