= Parque Dom Pedro II =

Park in São Paulo, Brazil

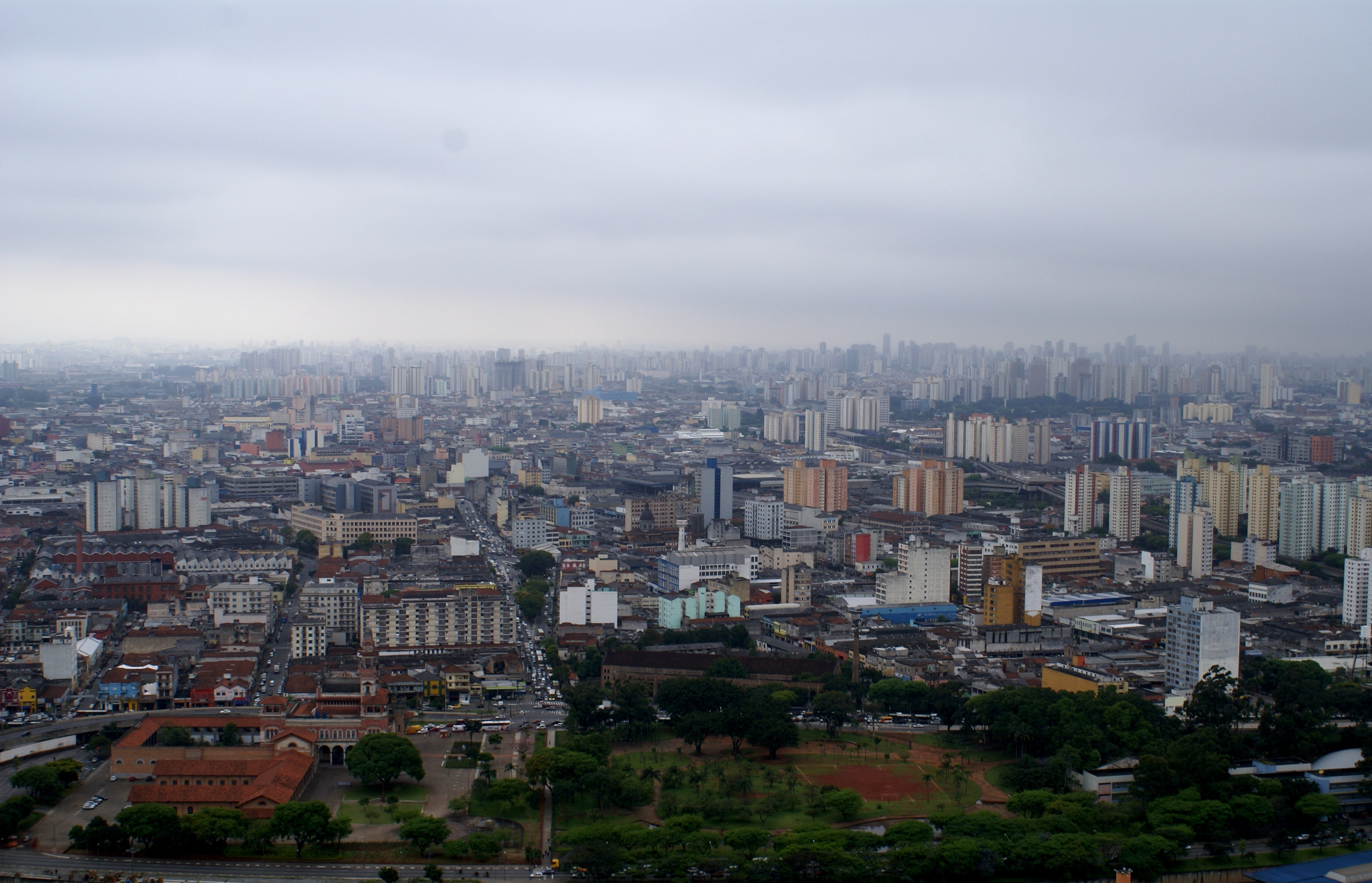
- Dom Pedro II Park in the foreground, seen from the Altino Arantes Building. In the background, the view to the east of the city.
- Interactive map of Parque Dom Pedro II
- Location: Sé, São Paulo, Brazil
- Coordinates: 23°33′02″S 46°37′39″W
- Created: 1922
- Administrator: City of São Paulo

Parque Dom Pedro II (Dom Pedro II Park in English) is a park located in the Sé neighborhood of São Paulo, Brazil. It lies on the border between the Historic Center of São Paulo and the Brás neighborhood.

== Features ==
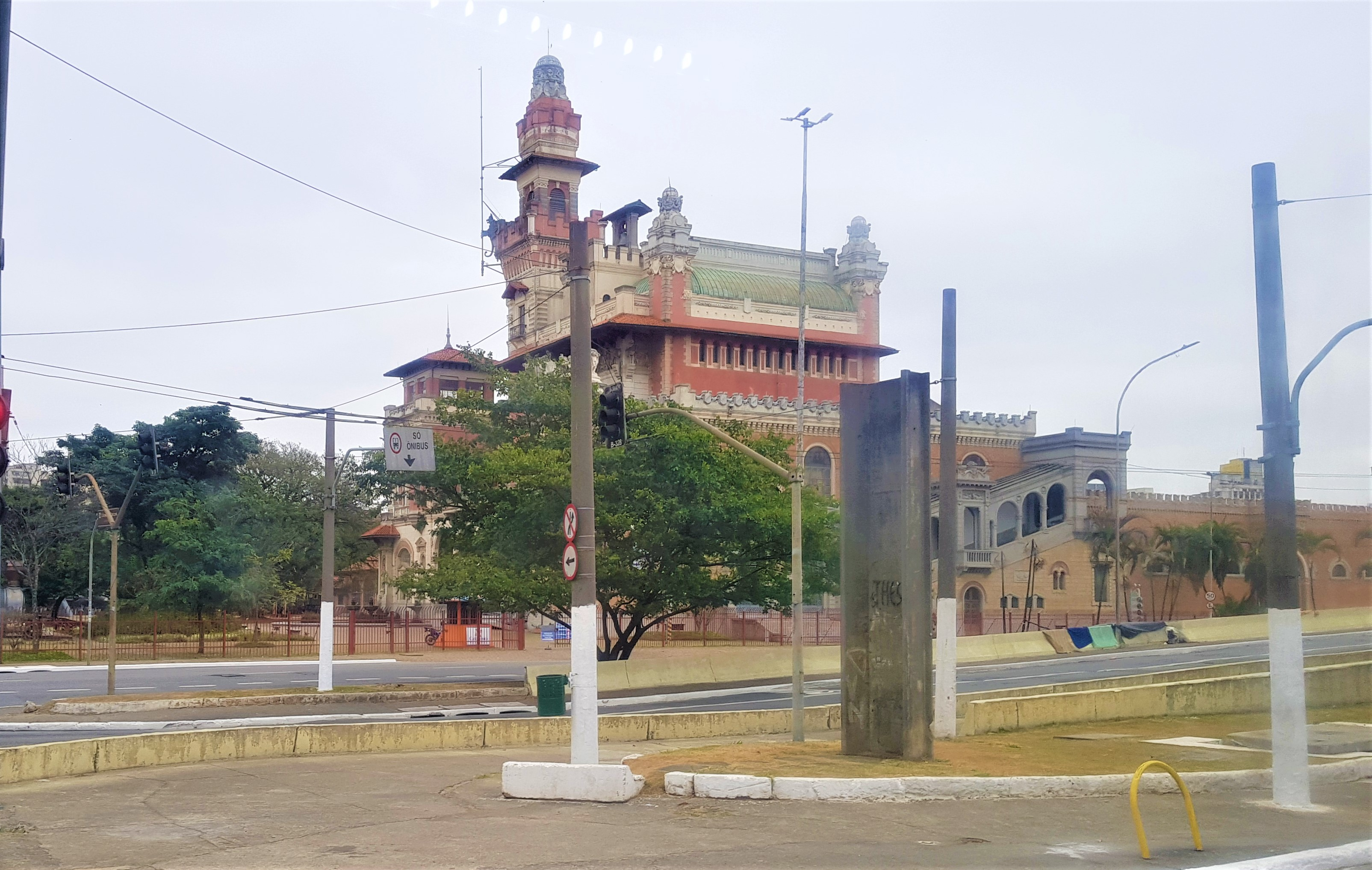
Palácio das Indústrias, located in Parque Dom Pedro II

The park is crossed by five viaducts and Avenida do Estado, with about half of the green area it originally had when it was inaugurated. Its area is home to the Parque Dom Pedro II bus terminal (the busiest in the city, serving mainly the eastern, southeastern and northeastern regions of the capital), the Pedro II Station of the São Paulo Metro and the São Paulo State School. This gave rise to one of the largest concentrations of hawkers in São Paulo.

The region also has several homeless people, petty crimes, and drug users in certain areas, and pedestrian traffic through the wooded areas and under the viaducts is considered unsafe. One of the most problematic areas in terms of security is the pedestrian crossing that separates the park from the Palácio das Indústrias - which has even been nicknamed the "Gaza Strip" - where muggers disguise themselves as homeless people to approach passers-by.

== History ==
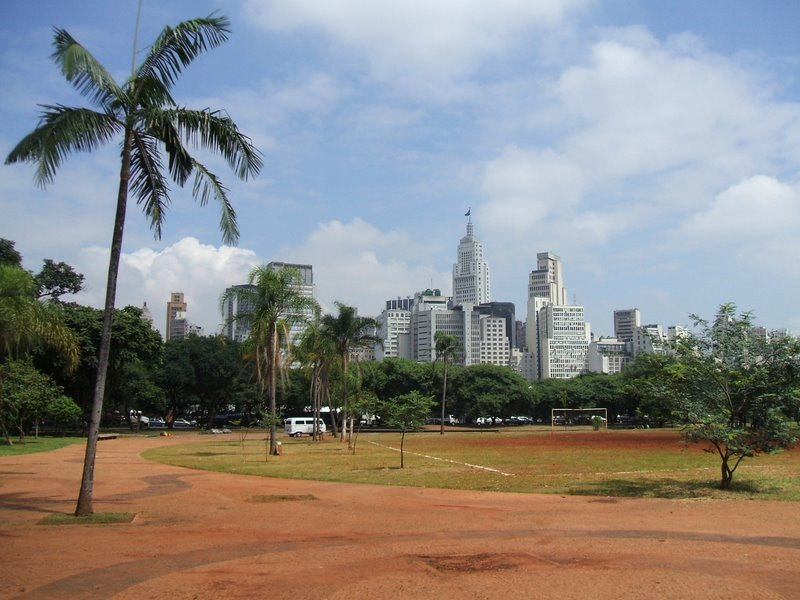
The park

The park is less than a kilometer away from Praça da Sé, in a part of the old floodplain Várzea do Carmo that used to be flooded by the Tamanduateí River. It was in the Várzea do Carmo that the first football match on Brazilian territory took place, although the exact location is unknown. The area became a garbage dump for around five years in the 1870s, but was reclaimed for health reasons and part of Várzea do Carmo was landfilled in the middle of the 19th century, when the river was straightened, and gardens and squares were created.

According to the newspaper O Estado de S. Paulo, "legend has it" that the building of the 2nd Guards Battalion, located in the park, was originally a gift from Emperor Pedro I to the Marchioness of Santos, serving as a venue for meetings between the two. The site would later become the headquarters of one of the Várzea do Carmo estates, the Educandas Seminary and the Alienated People's Hospice, from 1930 onwards the Public Force, and after the 1964 military coup it was taken over by the Army.

During the river straightening, Ilha dos Amores was created, an artificial island that was located near what is now Rua 25 de Março. Between the 1870s and 1880s, this landscaped islet was a leisure spot, where there were kiosks with drinks and food, as well as a bathroom and a place to rest. After several floods, the island was abandoned and ceased to exist in 1910, when the second straightening of the river took place.

Once beautiful and tree-lined, the park was inaugurated in 1922 to a design by Frenchman Joseph-Antoine Bouvard and was at the time considered the city's main leisure area. It was named the previous year after Brazil's second emperor. In the 1940s, it became the Shanghai Park, one of the busiest amusement parks in Brazil for many years, on the corner of Avenida do Estado and Rua da Mooca. The park was expropriated in November 1968 to make way for the viaducts that today cut through the area. The public tender for the preliminary works for the "urbanization" of the park was opened on June 3 of that year, providing for five viaducts, paving of the lanes of Avenida do Estado along the Tamanduateí River channel and other works. The inauguration of Avenida do Estado is considered to mark the beginning of the park's degradation, in addition to the construction of the viaducts in the 1960s, which eliminated much of the park's greenery.

The bus terminal was inaugurated on the corner of Avenida do Estado and Rua da Mooca, in 1971, and the Pedro II Metro Station, which began to be built a few years later, caused the park to lose even more green areas. In 1980, the park was, in the words of Folha de S.Paulo, "a construction site for the metro and the canalization of the Tamanduateí River, as well as [a] bus terminal". Today, it is one of the busiest places in the city, as it is a transit area, especially for those who travel between the center and the east side of São Paulo, but it is also considered "the area of the center most forgotten by the public authorities since the 1940s."

The park is constantly used as an example of the devastation that green areas have suffered in São Paulo in order to create or widen streets and avenues. The urban planner Nestor Goulart Reis, in an interview with O Estado de S. Paulo, declared in 2008 that "in the last seventy years the site has become a patchwork quilt, with only specific measures", and that "there has never been a project for the park as a whole that has been put into practice". In the changes that the park underwent in the second half of the 20th century, only the road system was privileged.

With the migration of the more affluent from the center to other neighborhoods, from the first half of the 20th century onwards, Dom Pedro II Park came to be considered the boundary between the "wealth of the noble part of the capital" and the eastern zone, the "city of workers", in a metaphor quoted by O Estado.

=== Revitalization projects and actions ===
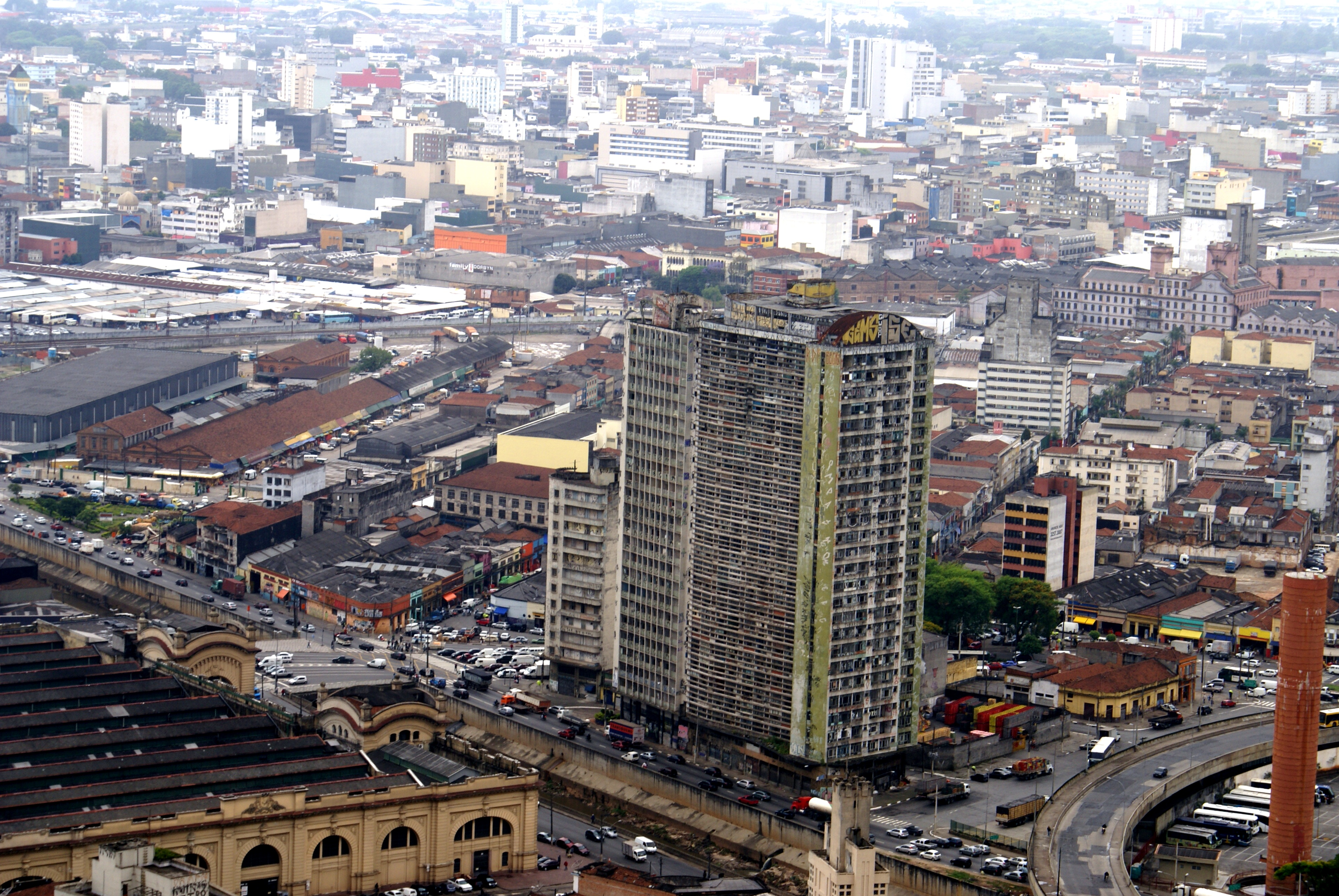
Municipal Market, left, Mercúrio and São Vito buildings (now demolished), center, and Diário Popular Viaduct, right

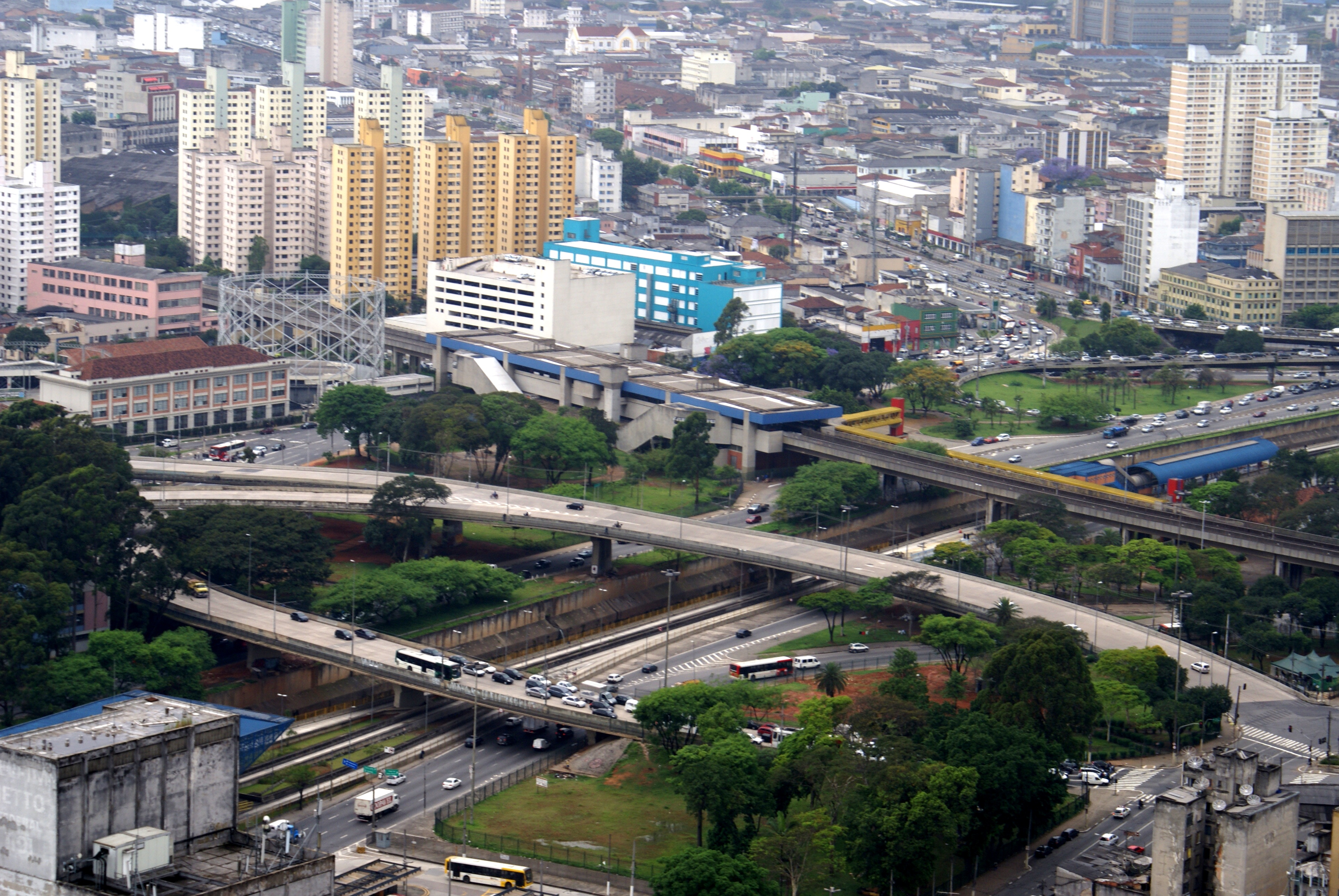
Some of the viaducts that cross the region

Viable ways of revitalizing the area have been studied, but some initiatives have been discontinued over the years. The demolition of the São Vito (a tenement vacated in 2004) and Mercúrio buildings, true symbols of the degradation of the area, aimed to integrate the São Paulo Municipal Market with Parque Dom Pedro II and the Palácio das Indústrias, as well as the demolition of the poorly maintained and underused Diário Popular Viaduct, built in 1969, whose foundations serve as a shelter for homeless people and addicts. The demolition of the two buildings was completed in May 2011. The viaduct was used in May 2010 by around 1,200 cars per hour, five times less than its capacity. With the demolitions, one of the ideas was to integrate the area into the park, in a project that, according to the city hall, was going to "make it the Ibirapuera Park of the city center." The demolition of the viaduct began in 1992, with the intention of redeveloping the park. The demolition started in 1992, but was halted due to protests from local shopkeepers because of the traffic jams caused on Avenida Mercúrio, Rua do Gasômetro and Rua da Figueira caused by the interdiction. Mayor Gilberto Kassab called for tenders for the demolition of the viaduct in October 2006, but again the project did not go ahead. The reason for the repeated postponements of the demolition was the complications that an implosion could cause, both for the traffic on Avenida do Estado and for the structure of the Municipal Market.

Although there have been plans to revitalize the area since 1989 - former mayor Luíza Erundina moved the city hall headquarters to the Palácio das Indústrias with the intention of recovering the area, where it remained between 1992 and 2004 - and the Kassab administration having had plans for these demolitions, even planning to move the bus terminal, they have taken a long time to get off the paper. The demolition of the buildings in the São Vito building block, the first step in the project, was only completed in May 2011. Among the projects was the renovation of the gardens between the Palácio das Indústrias and Pedro II station and the urban recovery of the park.

The Kassab administration hired the Foundation for Environmental Research, a body linked to the University of São Paulo, to draw up a new occupation proposal, which was due to be presented in July 2010 at a cost of 500,000 reais. According to the Folha de S.Paulo newspaper, two blocks were to be demolished between Pátio do Colégio and Dom Pedro II Park, including a garage building built irregularly in the 1980s, to make way for underground garages and a popular shopping mall or street market. There was pressure for the bus terminal next to the park to be extinguished, even though it is also where the final station of the Expresso Tiradentes is located, which cannot be removed. In October 2010, residents and shopkeepers in the area handed the city hall and the military police a list of twelve demands in the areas of urbanism and security. The response from city hall was a promise to meet the demands, while the police proposed the installation of a mobile community base in the park.

Many projects have been announced, especially for the block around the São Vito and Mercúrio buildings. In April 2011, an agreement was reached with the National Commercial Learning Service for the institution to build a gastronomic center on the land, part of a project that would integrate the Municipal Market into the park by means of a boulevard that would cover Avenida do Estado and the Tamanduateí River in the stretch in front of the market, with the avenue becoming a tunnel in this stretch and the Diário Popular Viaduct being demolished. In addition, the opening of a Serviço Social do Comércio (SESC) unit was planned. The area was transferred to SESC in December, but the organization was still waiting for a decree granting the use of the land to begin construction. The new unit was expected to be ready two and a half years after the decree was approved, which wasn't expected to happen until the first half of 2012. The counterparts to be offered by SESC were one hundred free spots for children aged between seven and twelve in one of its projects, as well as the promotion of recreational games, dental services, artistic shows and the maintenance of an environment with free internet and adequate equipment to access it.

There are also plans to install various cultural and educational facilities around the park, as well as changes to the bus terminal. Shopkeepers on Rua 25 de Março, next to the terminal, were concerned in 2011 about the possible change of location, especially if it was moved to Pari. The municipal secretary for Urban Development, Miguel Bucalem, guaranteed in May 2011 that the intention of the revitalization project was to rescue the park's original function, without giving up "modern needs" and "not as a simple return to the past." He said that the environmental and historical characteristics would be respected, as well as those linked to public transport, which meant the construction of an intermodal terminal next to the Pedro II Metro Station, including the Expresso Tiradentes and bus terminals.

However, in May 2013, the then-Municipal Secretary for Urban Development, Fernando de Mello Franco, revealed that the revitalization project proposed by the previous administration had been discarded. The reason for this was the high cost of implementing the project, budgeted at 1.5 billion reais.
