= Palácio das Indústrias =

Coordinates: 23.5442°S 46.6273°W

- Palácio das Indústrias (2017)

- Location within Brazil

General information
- Status: Built, Active
- Type: Industrial
- Architectural style: Eclectic
- Location: São Paulo, Brazil

Height
- Height: 50 m (160 ft)

The Palácio das Indústrias is a historical building in São Paulo, under the protection of the Council for the Defense of Historical, Archaeological, Artistic and Tourist Heritage (CONDEPHAAT).

It was designed by Domiziano Rossi in conjunction with Ramos de Azevedo and Ricardo Severo and is located in the Parque Dom Pedro II. It is a representative of the Eclectic style and was designed for hosting industrial exhibitions.

The first exhibition was held there in 1917. It was converted into a legislative assembly in 1947 and its name was changed to the "Palácio Nove de Julho" (Ninth of July, commemorating the Constitutionalist Revolution). In the 1970s, it also served as the home of the Public Security Secretariat and contained some jail cells.

In 1992, after restorations by the architect Lina Bo Bardi, it served briefly as the City Hall. Since 2009, it has been the home of the Catavento Museum science museum.

== History ==
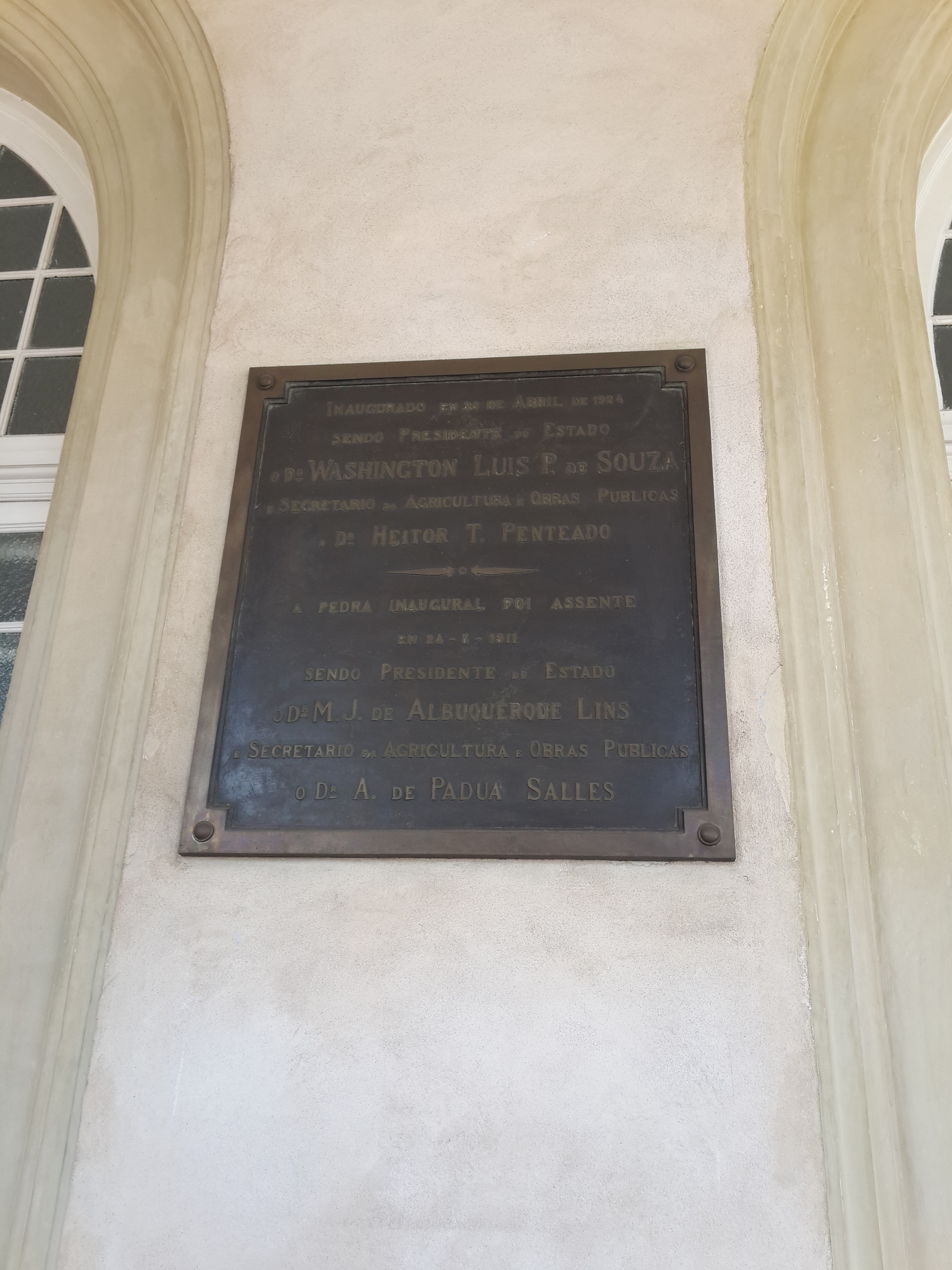
Inauguration plaque of the Palace of Industries.

The Palácio das Indústrias was built from 1911 to 1924, when the city of São Paulo had less than 1 million inhabitants. It was planned as the Palace of Industries, but the space also housed the exhibition of agriculture and livestock. Between 1947 and 1968, the building was the seat of the Legislative Assembly of São Paulo.

In 1992, the then-mayor Luiza Erundina transferred the seat of the municipal government to the palace. In 2004, after Marta Suplicy moved her office to the Patriarca Building, on the Viaduto do Chá, the palace was abandoned, and the bars from the fence surrounding the property were stolen. The area became known as the "Gaza Strip". The inauguration of Catavento revitalized the site. Due to the rapid growth of São Paulo, the Palácio das Indústrias, intended to be a place for exhibits, also had other uses such as: police station, legislative assembly, and headquarters of the São Paulo City Hall. In 2009, the building returned to its original purpose, exhibitions, by hosting the Catavento Cultural and Educational Center.

The São Vito and Mercúrio buildings, which once housed 800 families in poor condition, were emptied in February 2009. The buildings erected in the 1950s were demolished between 2010 and 2011. In 2014, the donation of the 9.2 thousand square meters area took place, sanctioned by former mayor Fernando Haddad (PT) and was published in the Official Gazette of the municipality in July of the same year. The bill was approved by the City Council in June, three years after being sent by the city to the Legislative. Originally, the measure was part of a revitalization plan for the central region of the capital, including the Dom Pedro II Park. The land was ceded to SESC.

== See also ==
- Catavento Museum
