= SESC-Pompeia (São Paulo Metro) =

Railway station in São Paulo, Brazil

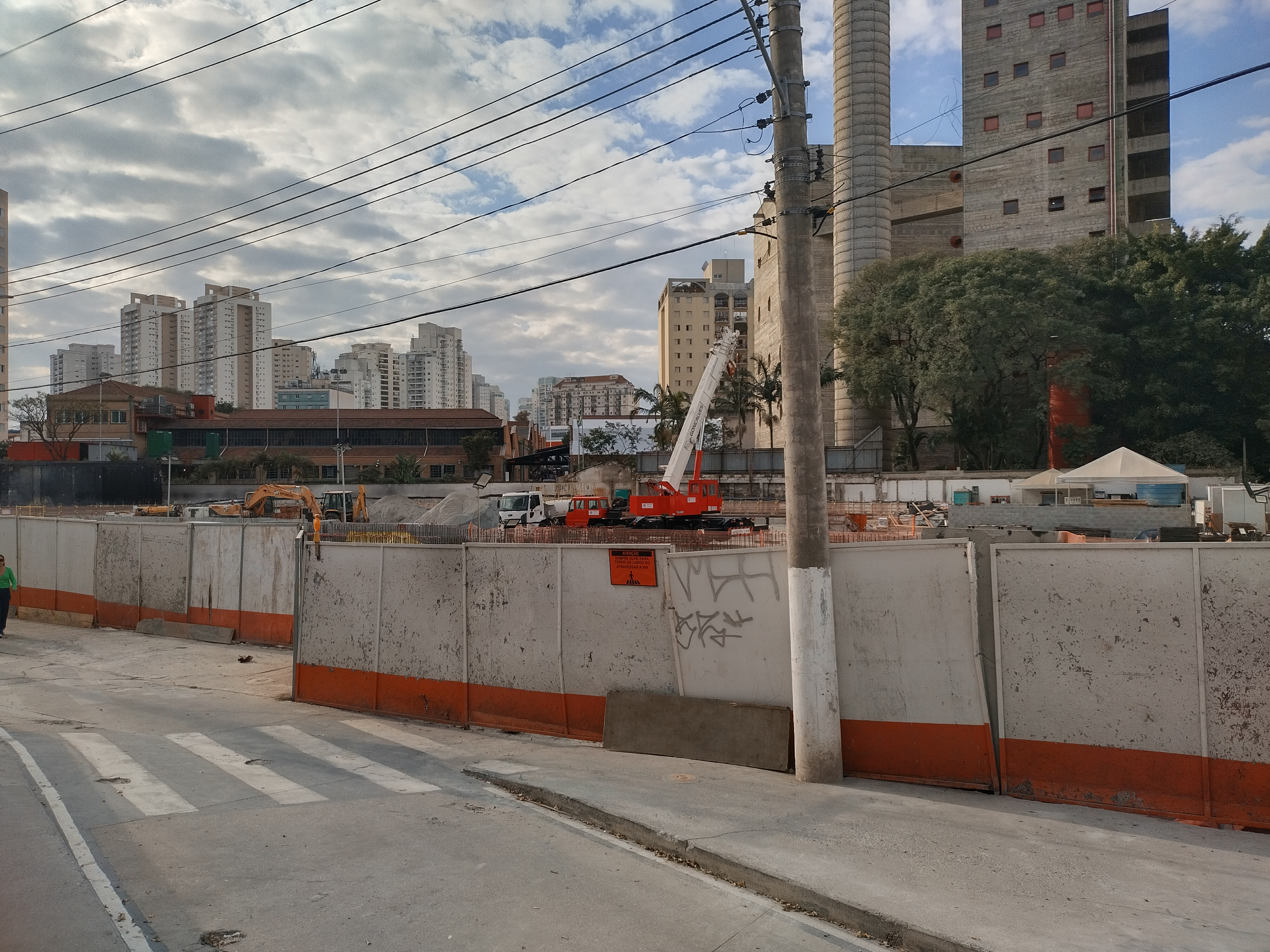
- Construction works in 2022

General information
- Location: Av. Pompeia × R. Venâncio Aires, Perdizes; São Paulo; Brazil
- Coordinates: 23.527042°S 46.683056°W
- Owner: Government of the State of São Paulo
- Operator: LinhaUni
- Platforms: Side platforms

Construction
- Structure type: Underground
- Accessible: Yes

History
- Opened: 2 July 2026
- Former names: Pompeia

Services
Preceding station	São Paulo Metro	Following station
Água Branca towards Brasilândia	Line 6	Perdizes towards São Joaquim
Track layout
Location

SESC-Pompeiais one of the stations of São Paulo Metro and belongs to Line 6-Orange, which is currently under tests. In its first phase, with 15.9 km (9.9 mi) of extension, Line 6 should connect Brasilândia district, in the North Side, to São Joaquim station of Line 1-Blue. Later, the line should connect Rodovia dos Bandeirantes to the borough of Cidade Líder, in the East Side.

The station is located in the confluence between Avenida Pompeia and Rua Venâncio Aires, where it attends Nubank Parque and Bourbon Shopping Mall, situated between the districts of Barra Funda and Perdizes.

The construction of the station began in 2016, when the opening date was estimated to mid-2020. Later, Governor Geraldo Alckmin promised the opening of the first phase of the line to 2020, time which was discarded due to a year of delay in the financing of the Federal Savings Bank, which would be used for the expropriations. In June 2016, the opening of the line was estimated for 2021, time kept in October 2017, when the resume of the construction was announced for the beginning of 2018. In September 2016, the construction was suspended, due to the involvement of the construction companies of the Move São Paulo consortium (Odebrecht, Queiroz Galvão, UTC Participações) in Operation Car Wash, which caused them to not get the financing of R$ 5.5 billions (US$ 1.6 billion) with the Brazilian Development Bank (BNDES) for the continuity of the construction. The State Government of São Paulo started negotiations with international companies, including Spanish Acciona and Chinese China Railway Construction Corporation. On 4 July 2020, the State Government of São Paulo signed a deal with Spanish company Acciona to conclude the construction of the line and operate it, in a Public Private Partnership, through Linha Universidade dealership.

== Characteristics ==
Buried station with side platforms, structure with apparent concrete and support rooms at-grade. It has access for people with disabilities.
