= Água Branca (São Paulo Metro) =

Railway station in São Paulo, Brazil

Coordinates: 23.52074°S 46.68835°W

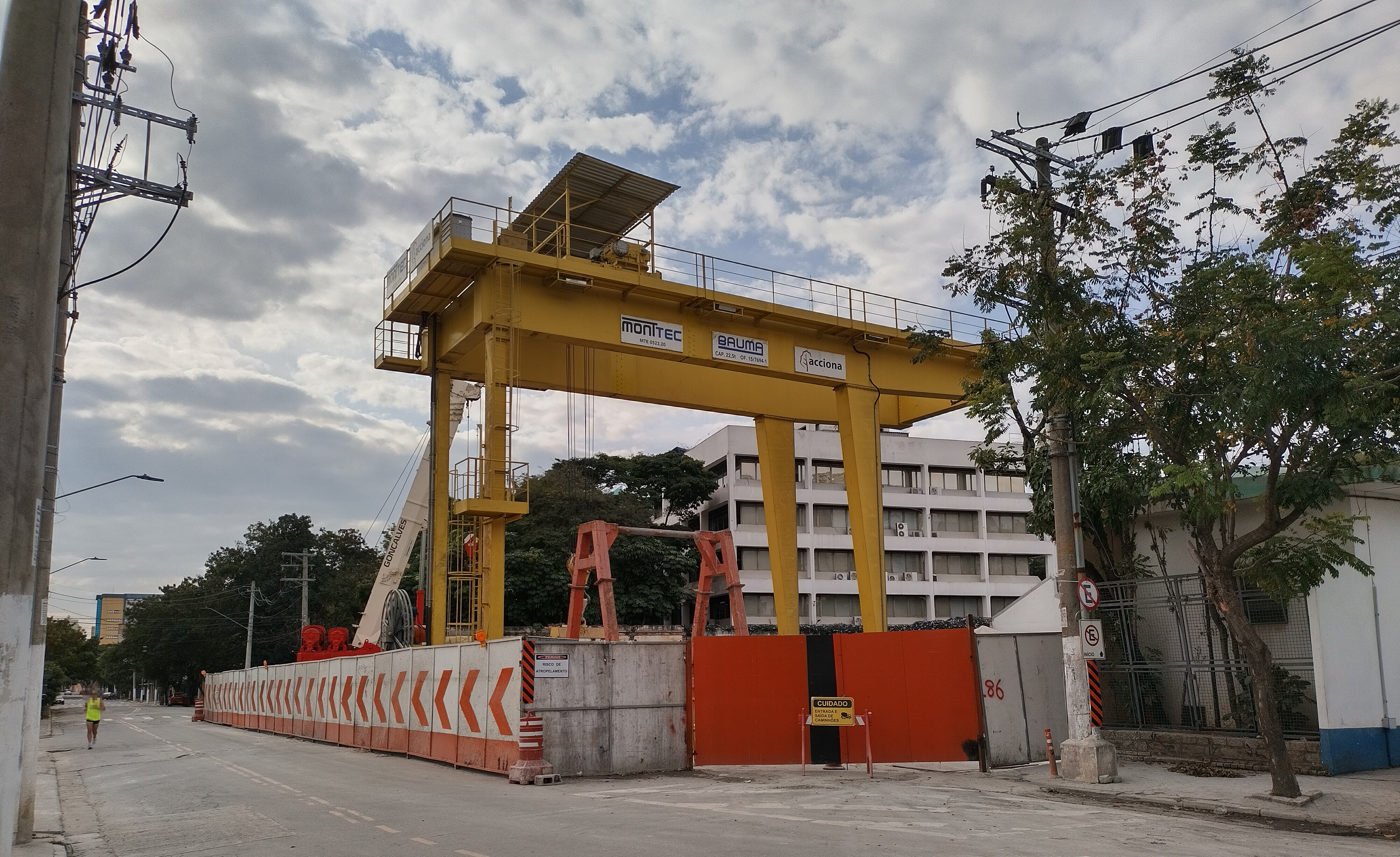
- Construction works in 2022

General information
- Location: Av. Santa Marina, s/n, Lapa; São Paulo; Brazil
- Owner: Government of the State of São Paulo
- Operator: LinhaUni
- Platforms: Side platforms
- Connections: (planned)

Construction
- Structure type: Underground
- Accessible: Yes

History
- Opened: 2 July 2026

Services
Preceding station	São Paulo Metro	Following station
Santa Marina towards Brasilândia	Line 6	SESC-Pompeia towards São Joaquim
Future services
Terminus	Line 3	Palmeiras-Barra Funda towards Corinthians-Itaquera
Out-of-system interchange
Preceding station	São Paulo Metropolitan Trains	Following station
Lapa towards Jundiaí	Line 7 transfer at Água Branca	Palmeiras-Barra Funda Terminus
Future out-of-system interchange
Preceding station	São Paulo Metropolitan Trains	Following station
Lapa towards Amador Bueno	Line 8 transfer at Água Branca	Palmeiras-Barra Funda towards Júlio Prestes
Track layout
Location

Água Branca is one of the stations of São Paulo Metro and belongs to Line 6-Orange, which is currently under tests. In its first phase, with 15.9 km (9.9 mi) of extension, Line 6 should connect Brasilândia district, in the North Side, to São Joaquim station of Line 1-Blue. Later, the line should connect Rodovia dos Bandeirantes to the borough of Cidade Líder, in the East Side.

The station is located in Avenida Santa Marina, next to the CPTM station.

The construction of the station began in 2016, when the opening date was estimated to mid-2020. Later, Governor Geraldo Alckmin promised the opening of the first phase of the line to 2020, time which was discarded due to a year of delay in the financing of the Federal Savings Bank, which would be used for the expropriations. In June 2016, the opening of the line was estimated for 2021, time kept in October 2017, when the resume of the construction was announced for the beginning of 2018. Currently, the construction is suspended, due to the involvement of the construction companies of the Move São Paulo consortium (Odebrecht, Queiroz Galvão, UTC Participações) in Operation Car Wash, which caused them to not get the financing of R$ 5.5 billion (US$ 1,575,344,427.58) with the Brazilian Development Bank (BNDES) for the continuity of the construction. The State Government of São Paulo is currently in negotiations with international companies, including Spanish Acciona and Chinese China Railway Construction Corporation.
