= Maristela (São Paulo Metro) =

Future railway station in São Paulo, Brazil

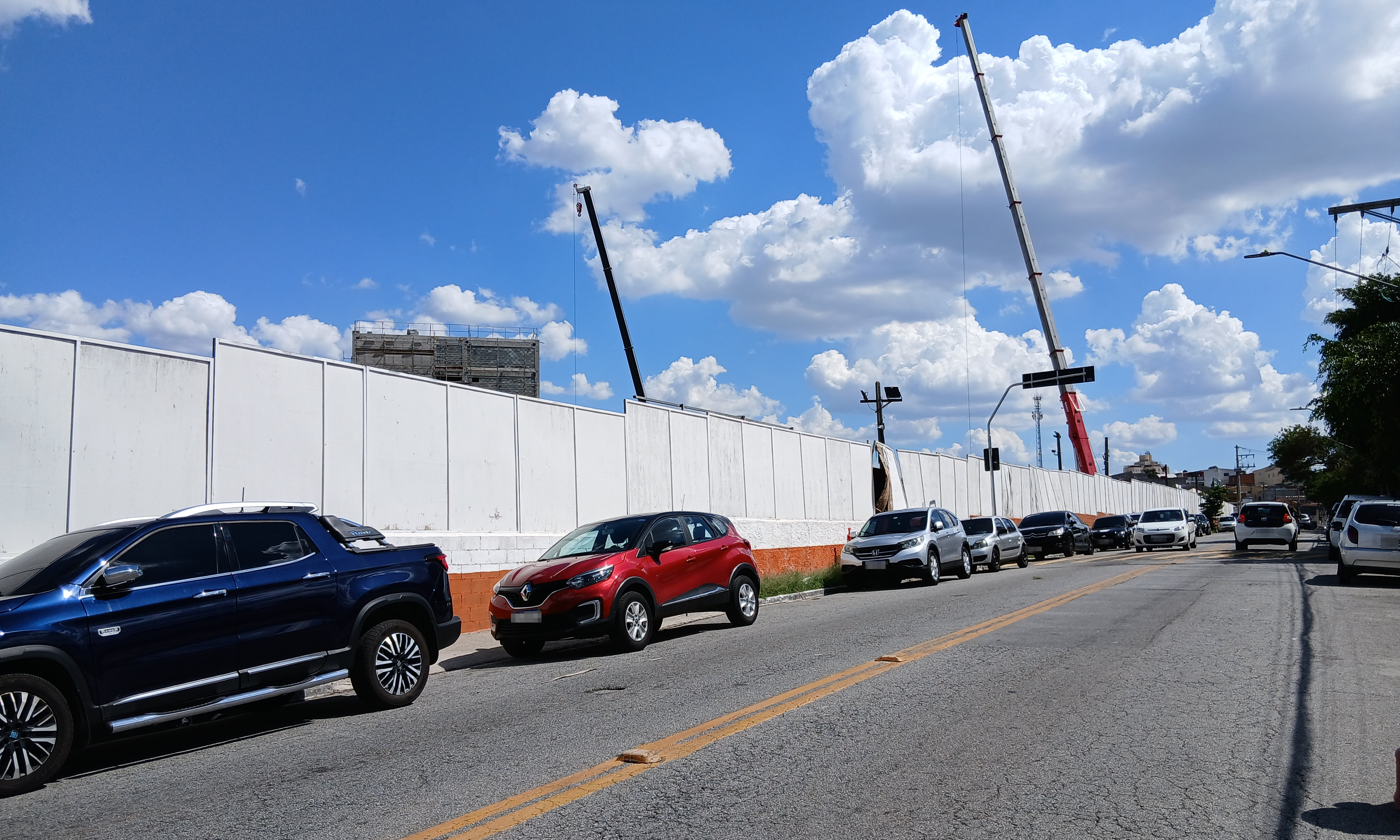
- Construction works in 2026

General information
- Location: Av. Michihisa Murata × Estrada do Sabão, Freguesia do Ó São Paulo; Brazil
- Coordinates: 23.476389°S 46.698889°W
- Owner: Government of the State of São Paulo
- Operator: LinhaUni
- Platforms: Side platforms
- Connections: Maristela Bus Terminal (future)

Construction
- Structure type: Underground
- Accessible: Yes

History
- Opening: 2027
- Former names: Vila Cardoso

Services
Preceding station	São Paulo Metro	Following station
Brasilândia Terminus	Line 6	Itaberaba-Hospital Vila Penteado towards São Joaquim
Track layout
Location

Maristela will be one of the future stations of São Paulo Metro and will belong to Line 6-Orange, which is under construction. In its first phase, with 15.9 km (9.9 mi) of extension, Line 6 should connect Brasilândia district, in the North Side, to São Joaquim station of Line 1-Blue. Later, the line should connect Rodovia dos Bandeirantes to the borough of Cidade Líder, in the East Side.

The station will be located in the confluence between Avenida Michihisa Murata and Estrada do Sabão, next to Rua Amaniutuba.

The construction of the station began in 2016, when the opening date was estimated to mid-2020. Later, Governor Geraldo Alckmin promised the opening of the first phase of the line to 2020, time which was discarded due to a year of delay in the financing of the Federal Savings Bank, which would be used for the expropriations. In June 2016, the opening of the line was estimated for 2021, time kept in October 2017, when the resume of the construction was announced for the beginning of 2018. Currently, the construction is suspended, due to the involvement of the construction companies of the Move São Paulo consortium (Odebrecht, Queiroz Galvão, UTC Participações) in Operation Car Wash, which caused them to not get the financing of R$ 5.5 billions (US$ 1,575,344,427.58) with the Brazilian Development Bank (BNDES) for the continuity of the construction. The State Government of São Paulo is currently in negotiations with international companies, including Spanish Acciona and Chinese China Railway Construction Corporation.
