= Line 6 (São Paulo Metro) =

São Paulo Metro Line 6 (Orange)

Overview
- Status: Operational; Partially under construction Partially planned
- Owner: Government of the State of São Paulo
- Locale: São Paulo, Brazil
- Termini: Brasilândia; São Joaquim
- Connecting lines: Current: Planned: 16 20
- Stations: 6 (operational); 9 (under construction)
- Website: www.linhauni.com.br

Service
- Type: Rapid transit
- System: São Paulo Metro
- Operator: LinhaUni (Acciona)
- Depot: Morro Grande rail yard
- Rolling stock: 132 Alstom 600 Series (22 trains)
- Daily ridership: 633,000 (estimated)

History
- Work began: 2012
- Opened: 2 July 2026 (1st section)

Technical
- Line length: 5.2 km (3.2 mi)
- Track gauge: 1,435 mm (4 ft 8 1/2 in) standard gauge
- Electrification: Overhead line, 1,500 V DC
- Operating speed: 80 km/h (50 mph)
- Signalling: Nippon Signal SPARCS CBTC

Line 6 (Orange) (Portuguese: Linha 6–Laranja) is a line of the São Paulo Metro. The first section will be 15.9-kilometre (9.9 mi) long, with 15 stations, and will link the São Joaquim metro station (Line 1 (Blue) to the district of Brasilândia. The branch is known as the "Colleges line" as it will serve many of them along its route (FAAP, PUC-SP and Mackenzie University).

== History ==
Future map of Sao Paulo Metropolitan Rail Transport Network, with Line 6 - Orange and all other lines currently under construction or expansion.

This new line will connect with Line 7 (Ruby) and Line 8 (Diamond) of Companhia Paulista de Trens Metropolitanos (CPTM) and lines Line 1 (Blue), Line 2 (Green) and Line 4 (Yellow) of the metro, linking the Northwest, West, Central, and Southeast regions of São Paulo., totaling 18.4 km (11.4 mi) in length with 17 stations. The anticipated demand for this line is 600,000 to 800,000 passengers per day. In 2008, it was predicted that construction would start by 2010, expected to start partial operations in 2012 and full operation by early 2015, but two years later it was expected that the project plans would be finalized only in 2011, with the first stations opening between 2013 and 2014 or as late as 2016, according to some engineers of the Metro.

On March 25, 2008, the State Governor and the mayor of São Paulo pledged to deliver the new metro line by 2012. The municipal government gave the State R$75 million to fund the preliminary designs for the construction of this line. In principle, the operation of the line will be the responsibility of the Metro, but there is still the possibility of creating a Public-Private Partnership, which was eventually confirmed.

Currently, the extension of the line between Brasilândia and São Joaquim is confirmed, providing linkage to Line 1-Blue.

At the other end of the line, Governor José Serra announced on December 4, 2008 that there would be two branches leaving Freguesia do Ó toward the periphery of the North Zone, one in Brasilândia beside a bus terminal that is under study by the city, and another in Vila Nova Cachoeirinha in Largo Japonês, next to an existing bus terminal. It will be the first time that the São Paulo Metro will use a "Y " path, something that already exists in the USA, Europe, Australia and also in other metro systems in Brazil, such as the Federal District Metro. The planning director for Metro, Mark Kassab, explained that there will be a need to change trains at Freguesia do Ó station, because trains will alternate with different destinations across the line.

The functional design of the line was released in June 2010 and referred to the expropriation of 350 commercial and residential properties along the line, including the headquarters of samba school Vai-Vai in Bela Vista and a unit of supermarkets in Consolação. Issues with financing and property expropriations continued to persist, delaying the start of construction. Construction officially started on April 13, 2015 with a projected completion date of the first section in 2021. In 2016, progress on the project was halted due to difficulty obtaining financing from the Brazilian Development Bank, putting the project's 2021 completion deadline into jeopardy.

In January 2018, it was announced that RuasInvest Participações SA will acquire a 15% stake, along with China Railway Construction Corporation Limited which will have a 50% stake in the concession and the rest is acquired by a group of Japanese investors led by Mitsui which will receive 35%. The opening deadline for the project confirmed for the end of 2021.

An extension from São Joaquim to Cidade Líder was in planning, but it was replaced by the planning of Line 16-Violet.

On 4 July 2020, after almost 4 years of suspended construction, the State Government of São Paulo signed a deal with Spanish company Acciona to conclude the construction of the line and operate it, in a Public Private Partnership, through Linha Universidade dealership.

In the morning of February 1st, 2022, the asphalt of Marginal Tietê, right by one of the wells opened for the line's construction, gave in and opened a hole. The cause of the incident is currently being investigated. Nevertheless, it was revealed that the construction of the line would be postponed by 3 years from its initial expected completion date. The line would begin partial operation by 2026, with full operation by 2027.

On 2 July 2026, the section between João Paulo I and Perdizes was opened for limited trial service.

== Stations ==
Code	Station	Platforms	Position	Connections	District
BRA	Brasilândia	Side platforms	Underground	Brasilândia Bus Terminal (Future)	Brasilândia
VCS	Maristela	Side platforms	Underground	Maristela Bus Terminal (Future)	Freguesia do Ó
ITA	Itaberaba–Hospital Vila Penteado	Side platforms	Underground	-	Freguesia do Ó
JPP	João Paulo I	Side platforms	Underground	João Paulo I Bus Terminal (Future)	Freguesia do Ó
FGO	Freguesia do Ó	Side platforms	Underground	-	Freguesia do Ó
SMA	Santa Marina	Side platforms	Underground	20 (Planned)	Barra Funda
ABR	Água Branca	Side platforms	Underground	(Planned)	Lapa
SPA	SESC–Pompeia	Side platforms	Underground	-	Perdizes
PZE	Perdizes	Side platforms	Underground	-	Perdizes
PUC	PUC–Cardoso de Almeida	Side platforms	Underground	-	Perdizes
TBA	FAAP–Pacaembu	Side platforms	Underground	-	Consolação
MKZ	Higienópolis–Mackenzie	Side platforms	Underground	Line 4 (São Paulo Metro)	Consolação
BIX	14 Bis–Saracura	Side platforms	Underground	Santo Amaro–9 de Julho–Centro Bus Corridor	Bela Vista
TZM	Bela Vista	Side platforms	Underground	-	Bela Vista
JQM	São Joaquim	Side platforms	Underground	Line 1 (São Paulo Metro)	Liberdade

== Rolling stock ==
Six car open-gangway trains similar to the ones on Line 4 will be manufactured by Alstom using the Metropolis platform. The contract was signed in 2016. Each train will accommodate up to 2,044 passengers and reach speeds of 90 km/h. They will also be fitted with modern technology for passenger counting, video surveillance, and a design built around better passenger flow.
