= Freguesia do Ó =

District of São Paulo, Brazil

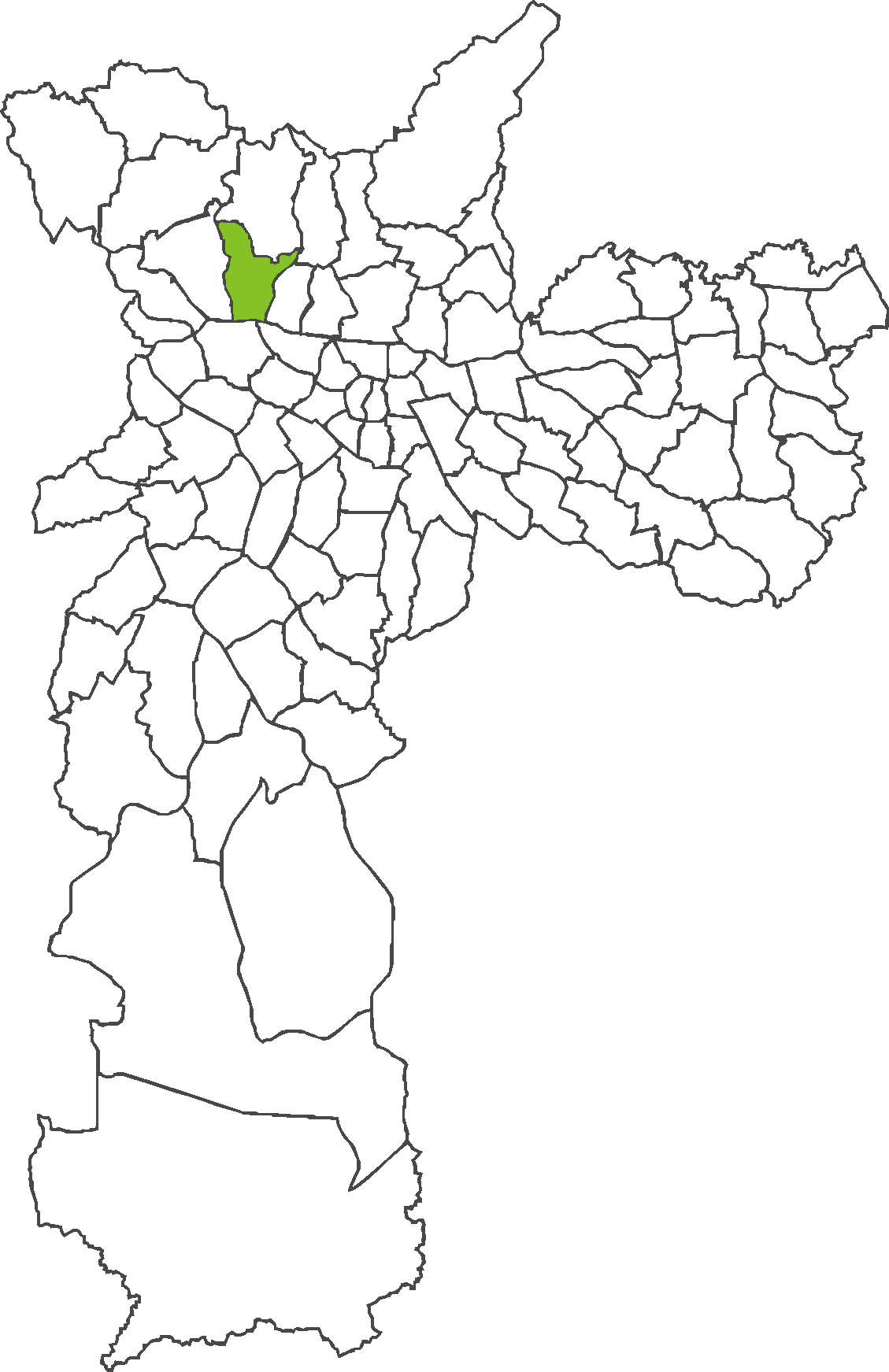
- District of the city of São Paulo
- Coordinates: 23.5016°S 46.6986°W
- Country: Brazil
- State: São Paulo
- Municipality: São Paulo
- Subprefecture: Freguesia-Brasilândia

Area
  - Total: 10.50 km^{2} (4.05 sq mi)

Population (2022)
  - Total: 137,240
  - Density: 13,070/km^{2} (33,850/sq mi)
- HDI: 0.762 high
- Website: Subprefecture of Freguesia Brasilândia

Freguesia do Ó is one of 96 districts in the city of São Paulo, Brazil. Situated in the northwest zone, it served as a route between the city and the region of Campinas and Jundiaí, in the São Paulo state. It is known for its parish church (the first one to be built there), for being the oldest district (Portuguese: freguesia) in the state capital and for housing the samba school Sociedade Rosas de Ouro, a seven-time champion of the São Paulo carnival.

== Etymology ==
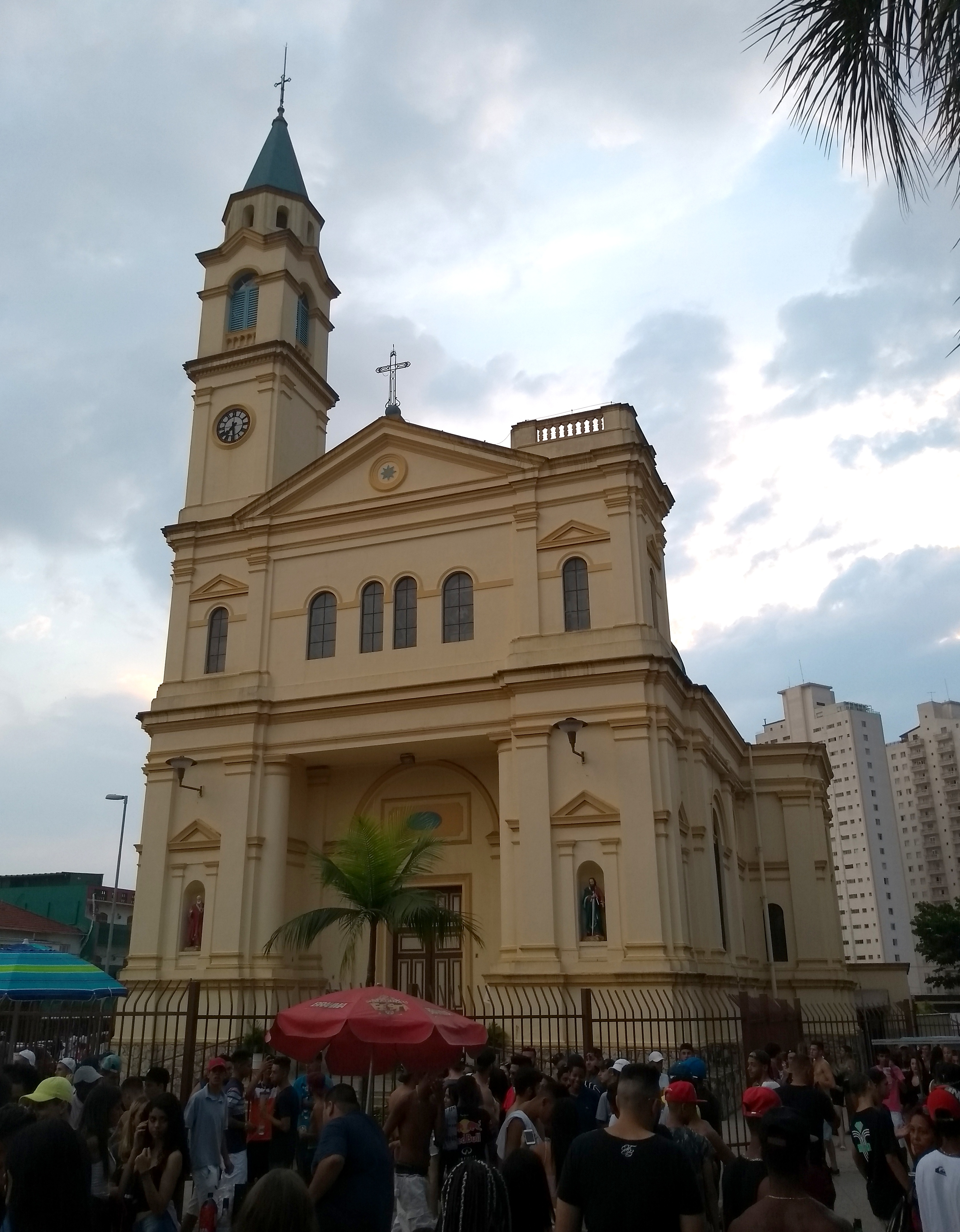
Church of the Expectation of the Blessed Virgin Mary

The district was named "freguesia" (lit. 'parish') by a decree from the Queen of Portugal, Maria I, on September 15, 1796, when the Village of São Paulo had only one district: Sé. Under the "Padroado" regime, when the Freguesia da Sé was divided into three parts, São Paulo was constituted as follows: Freguesia of Sé, Freguesia of Penha and Freguesia da Nossa Senhora do Ó. The term "freguesia" comes from the Portuguese adaptation of the Latin term "Filii Eclaesia" (lit. 'Children of the Church'), currently referred to as "paróquia" in Portuguese.

This honor was the only one that remained in the official name among the São Paulo districts. It was granted as a form of division of the Episcopate, making it easier for the faithful residents in distant regions who no longer needed to travel for hours for religious support. The other districts, such as Brás, Penha and Santo Amaro, gradually stopped using it in their names; and the "Freguesia de Nossa Senhora do Ó" was simply called "Freguesia do Ó".

== History ==
The region of Freguesia do Ó was settled in 1580, when the bandeirante Manuel Preto took over the place with his family and enslaved Indigenous people. Initially, the land was named Sítio do Jaraguá and its area included the Pico do Jaraguá (where gold was believed to exist) and the lands equivalent to the present-day districts of Pirituba and Limão.

In 1610, Manuel Preto requested authorization from the parish headquarters to build a chapel in honor of the Expectation of the Blessed Virgin Mary (Portuguese: Nossa Senhora do Ó), which gave the place its name. Manuel and his wife, Águeda Rodrigues, began construction of the chapel dedicated to the Virgin Mary under the name Nossa Senhora da Esperança or Nossa Senhora da Expectação after getting approval on September 29, 1615.

A century and a half later, in 1796, the new church was inaugurated. It was built in the present-day "Largo da Matriz Velha" and became a Parish by the constitution charter of September 15, 1796, granted by the Queen of Portugal. It remained in place until 1896, when it was destroyed by an accidental fire caused by the sacristan who was trying to burn a swarm of bees. In 1901, the current church that occupies the Largo area was inaugurated and named Paróquia Matriz Nossa Senhora da Expectação.

Sugarcane cultivation was widespread in the region, mainly for the production of aguardiente (sugarcane spirit). Numerous distilleries ensured the production of fine cachaça, known as caninha do Ó. Other subsistence crops were also grown, such as coffee, cassava, cotton, maize and vegetables. For many years, the district was considered part of the so-called "Green Belt" of the São Paulo capital. Sugarcane cultivation was the main rural activity in the region until the mid-20th century, before the expansion of the city's urbanization.

In the 1950s, the district was connected to the city with the construction of the Freguesia do Ó bridge, replacing the old wooden bridge built in 1741. In the 1970s, the mayor Olavo Setúbal established the avenues Inajar de Souza and General Edgard Facó. On the same avenues, he carried out the channelization of the Cabuçu and Verde rivers, respectively.

In 1996, the Associação Amigos do Ó (Friends of Ó Association) was created and its achievements include transforming an abandoned lot into a square that bears the association's name. In 2015, the construction of the Freguesia do Ó Station began, part of the future Line 6-Orange of the São Paulo Metro, in Vila Arcádia. The district will have four more stations when it is completed: João Paulo I, Itaberaba – Hospital Vila Penteado, Maristela and Brasilândia, the latter located on the border with the district of the same name.

The district is home to the samba school Rosas de Ouro, a seven-time champion of the São Paulo carnival.

== Demography ==
The district has been undergoing real estate appreciation since 2024. This is partly due to the presence of vacant lots and simple old houses with low commercial value compared to other parts of the city, which has led to significant urban renewal. These changes are largely due to the realignment the Tietê River underwent during the administration of mayor Prestes Maia, with the construction of Inajar de Souza and General Edgard Facó avenues in the 1980s and later on. Another reason is the construction of the future Line 6-Orange of the subway system, which will include some stations in the area.

Demographic evolution of the Freguesia do Ó district

== Neighborhoods ==
In addition to the neighborhood of Freguesia do Ó, the district is made up of at least 64 other neighborhoods, with a middle and upper-middle class population as well as some areas of poverty. In 2008, about 1.02% of households were in favela areas.

Below is the list of neighborhoods in the Freguesia do Ó district:

- Chácara do Rosário;
- Chácara Domilice;
- Chácara Nossa Sra. Aparecida;
- Conj. Res. Prestes Maia;
- Itaberaba;
- Jardim Adélia;
- Jardim Cachoeira;
- Jardim Iracema;
- Jardim Maristela;
- Jardim Monjolo;
- Jardim Monte Alegre;
- Jardim Noêmia;
- Jardim São Marcos;
- Moinho Velho;
- Nossa Senhora do Ó;
- Pq. Dom Luís;
- Pq. Mandi;
- Pq. Monteiro Soares;
- Vila Acre;
- Vila Albertina;
- Vila Amélia;

- Vila Arcádia;
- Vila Bancária Munhoz;
- Vila Bela;
- Vila Bracáia;
- Vila Brito;
- Vila Bruna;
- Vila Cardoso;
- Vila Cavatton;
- Vila Cruz das Almas;
- Vila do Congo;
- Vila Dona América;
- Vila Gonçalves;
- Vila Hebe;
- Vila Iara;
- Vila Iório;
- Vila Ismênia;
- Vila Júlio César;
- Vila Manuel Lopes;
- Vila Mariliza;
- Vila Marilu;
- Vila Marina;

- Vila Miriam;
- Vila Morro Grande;
- Vila Morro Verde;
- Vila Nívea;
- Vila Palmeiras;
- Vila Peruccio;
- Vila Picinin;
- Vila Portuguesa;
- Vila Primavera;
- Vila Progresso;
- Vila Ramos;
- Vila Regina;
- Vila Sá e Silva;
- Vila Santa Delfina;
- Vila São Francisco;
- Vila São Vicente;
- Vila Schmidt;
- Vila Simões;
- Vila Siqueira;
- Vila Timóteo;
- Vila União;
- Vila Zulmira Maria.

Neighborhoods that will have stations on the future Line 6 of the São Paulo subway:

- Vila Arcádia / Vila Albertina
- Parque Monteiro Soares / Vila Palmeiras
- Itaberaba
- Vila Cardoso / Sítio Morro Grande

== Bordering districts ==
- Brasilândia (North)
- Cachoeirinha (Northeast)
- Limão (East)
- Barra Funda (Southeast)
- Lapa (South)
- Pirituba (West)
