= Trojan Construction & Holding Group =

UAE construction company

Trojan Construction Group
- Company type: Private company
- Industry: Construction
- Founded: 2012
- Founder: Eng Hamad Salem Al Ameri
- Headquarters: Abu Dhabi, United Arab Emirates
- Services: Residential Developments, Commercial developments, Hotels, Infrastructure, High Rise Development
- Number of employees: 28000+
- Parent: Alpha Dhabi Holding PJSC
- Website: trojanconstruction.group

The Trojan Construction & Holding Group, is a UAE based construction company headquartered in Abu Dhabi, United Arab Emirates. It was founded in the year 2012 by Eng. Hamad Al Ameri. It is a subsidiary and construction vertical of Alpha Dhabi Holding.

The Group currently has eight subsidiaries:

- Trojan General Contracting,
- National Projects & Construction,
- Royal Advance Electromechanical Works,
- Reem Emirates Aluminum,
- Hi-Tech Concrete Products,
- Al Maha Modular Industries,
- Phoenix Timber Factory and
- Reem Readymix.

== Regional Projects ==
- Etihad Rail: national transportation project in United Arab Emirates. This joint venture between National Projects Construction and China Railway Construction Corporation includes civil works and construction of 145km package of the Etihad rail. The construction included 15 tunnels through the Hajar Mountains covering a total length of 16km, in addition to the construction of 35 bridges and 32 underpasses.
- The Palm Tower, located in Palm Jumeirah, Dubai, United Arab Emirates. Trojan General Contracting and National Projects and Contracting have been awarded the project.
- Emirati Housing: located in Jebal Hafeet, Al Ain.
