= Subprefecture of Freguesia-Brasilândia =

Coordinates: 23°29′S 46°42′W

- Subprefecture
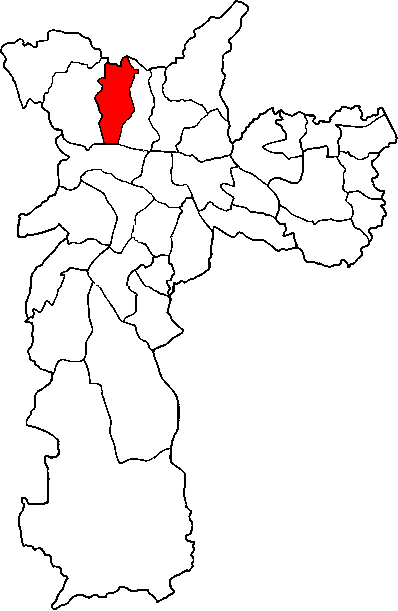
- Location of the Subprefecture of Freguesia-Brasilândia in São Paulo

- Location of municipality of São Paulo within the State of São Paulo
- Country: Brazil
- Region: Southeast
- State: São Paulo
- Municipality: São Paulo
- Administrative Zone: Northwest
- Districts: Freguesia do Ó, Brasilândia

Government
  - Type: Subprefecture
  - Subprefect: Valdir Suzano

Area
  - Total: 32.24 km^{2} (12.45 sq mi)

Population (2008)
  - Total: 416,743
- Website: Subprefeitura Freguesia-Brasilândia (Portuguese)

The Subprefecture of Freguesia-Brasilândia is one of 32 subprefectures of the city of São Paulo, Brazil. It comprises two districts: Freguesia do Ó and Brasilândia.
