= Vergueiro (São Paulo Metro) =

São Paulo Metro station

Vergueiro–Sebrae
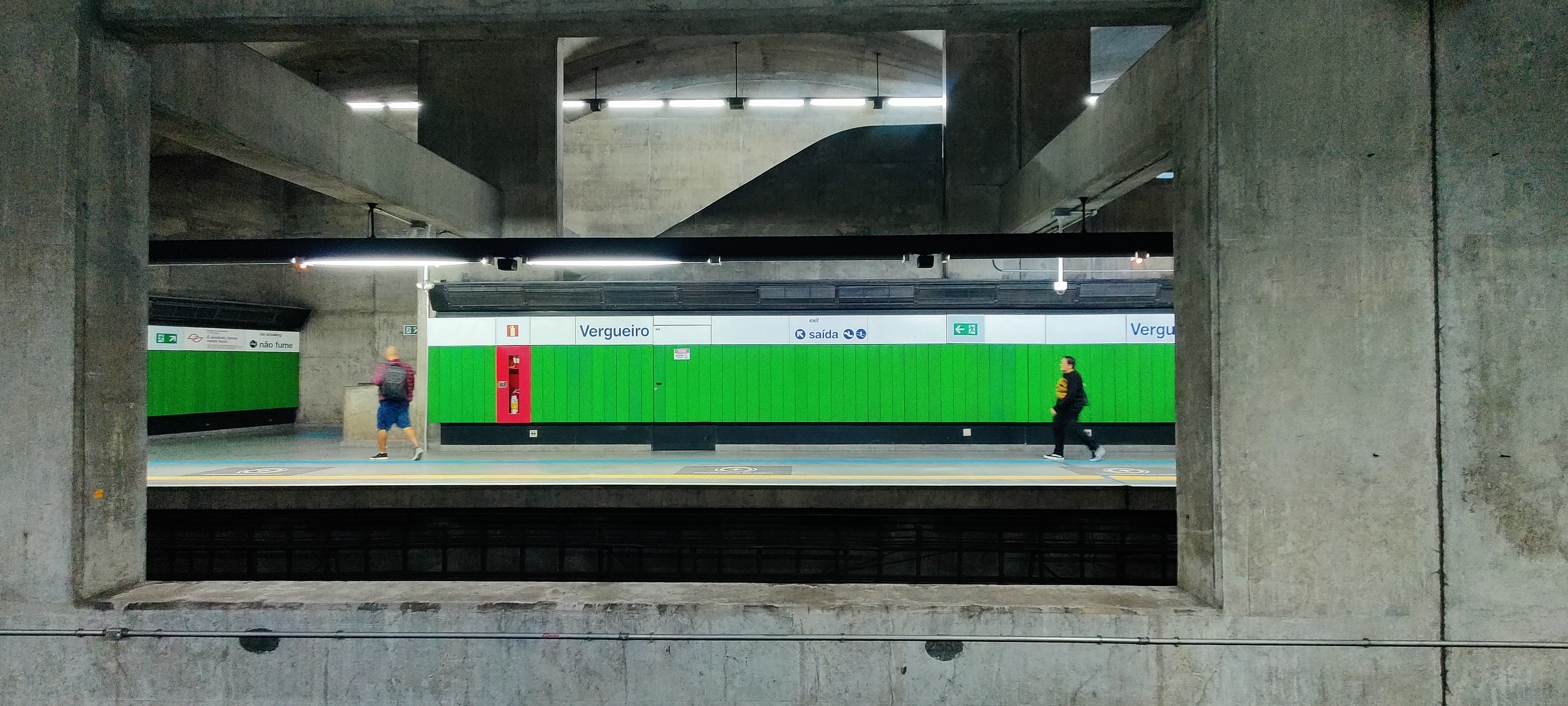
- Vergueiro station platform

General information
- Location: 790 Rua Vergueiro; São Paulo; Brazil
- Coordinates: 23°34′08″S 46°38′23″W
- Owner: Government of the State of São Paulo
- Operator: Companhia do Metropolitano de São Paulo
- Platforms: Side platforms

Construction
- Structure type: Underground
- Accessible: y

Other information
- Station code: VGO

History
- Opened: February 17, 1975
- Former names: Aclimação

Passengers
- 26,000/business day

Services
Preceding station	São Paulo Metro	Following station
São Joaquim towards Tucuruvi	Line 1	Paraíso towards Jabaquara
Track layout
Location

Vergueiro, also known as Vergueiro–Sebrae for sponsorship reasons, is a station on Line 1 (Blue) of the São Paulo Metro.

== SPTrans ==
Passengers may access the following SPTrans routes from the station:

Line	Destination
5705/10	Terminal Sacomã
5791/10	Eldorado
