= Northwest Zone of São Paulo =

Coordinates: 23°28′01″S 46°43′11″W

Northwest Zone of São Paulo Zona Noroeste
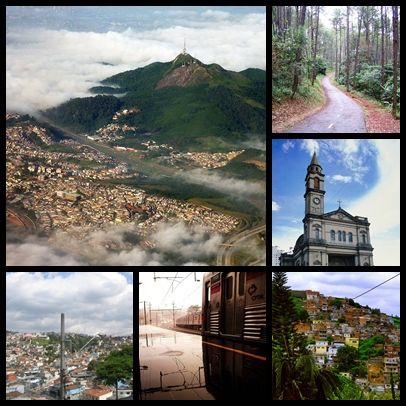

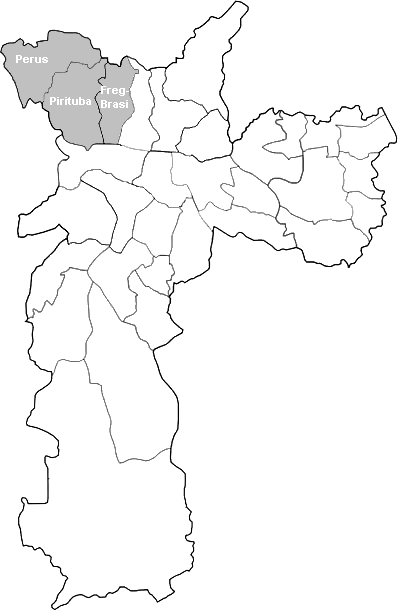
- Location of Northwest Zone of São Paulo, Top left:Aeral view of The peak of Jaragua in Cantareira mountain range, Top upper right:A forest zona with a cycling and walking road in Anhanguera Park in Peras, Top lower right:O Santa Maria Church in Freguesia do O area, Bottom left:Vila Malvina residential area in Perus, Bottom middle:Jaragua railroad station, Bottom right:View of Jose Lopes residential area, nearby Cantareira mountain range
- Country: Brazil
- State: São Paulo
- City: São Paulo
- Subprefectures: Northwest Zone: Pirituba-Jaraguá; Perus; Freguesia-Brasilândia

The Northwest Zone is an Administrative Zone of São Paulo, Brazil.
