= Perdizes (district of São Paulo) =

District of São Paulo, Brazil

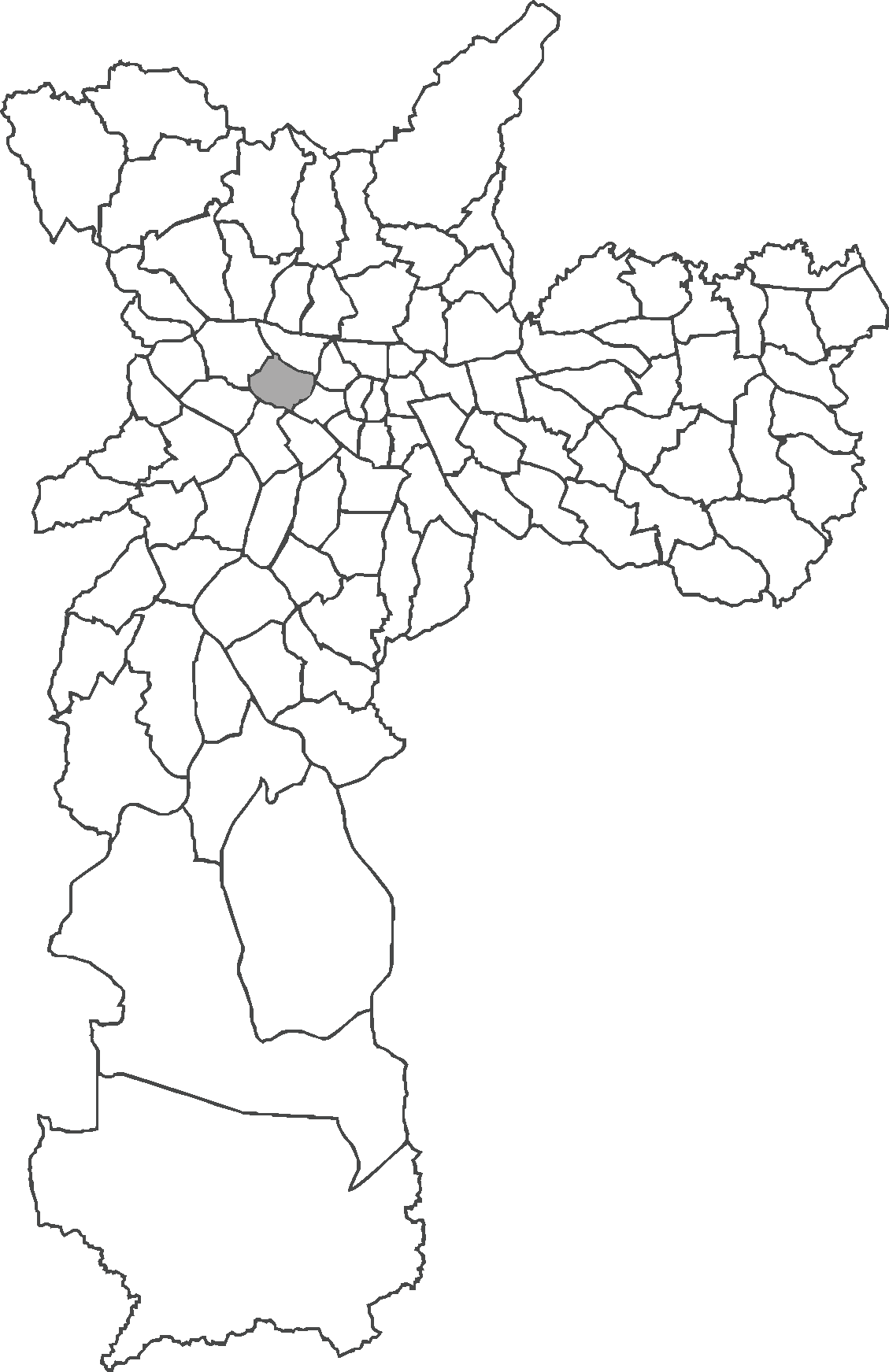
- Location in the city of São Paulo

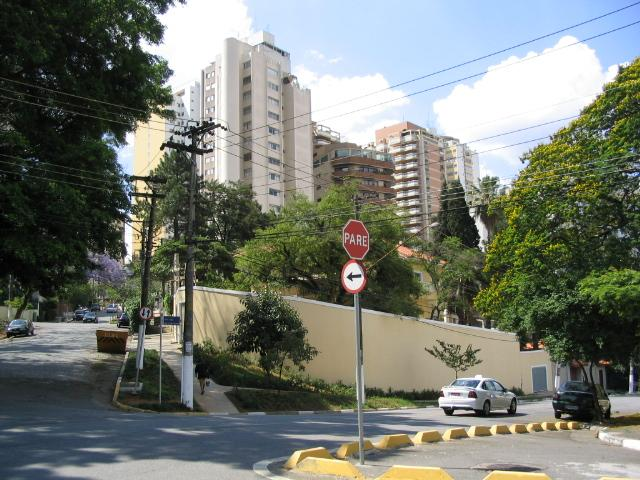
- Country: Brazil
- State: São Paulo
- City: São Paulo

Government
  - Type: Subprefecture
  - Subprefect: Soninha Francine

Population (2000)
  - Total: 102.445
- HDI: 0.957 –high
- Website: Subprefecture of Lapa

Perdizes ([peʁˈdʒizis], Portuguese for "Partridges") is a district in the subprefecture of Lapa, in São Paulo, Brazil.

Located in the area once home to the Pacaembu Farm, Perdizes was historically considered only a poor rural area. Today, it is one of the most urbanized areas of São Paulo and known for being the home of the Pontifical Catholic University of São Paulo.
