= Linha Universidade =

Overview
- Main regions: São Paulo, Brazil
- Fleet: 132 Alstom 600 Series (22 trains)
- Stations called at: 15
- Parent company: Acciona
- Headquarters: Rua das Olimpíadas, 134; Itaim Bibi; São Paulo, Brazil
- Key people: Fracisco Pierrini (CEO)
- Dates of operation: 22 November 2019–present

Technical
- Track gauge: 1,435 mm (4 ft 8 1/2 in)
- Electrification: Overhead line, 750 V DC
- Length: 15.9 km (9.9 mi)
- Operating speed: 90 km/h (56 mph)

Other
- Website: www.linhauni.com.br

Linha Universidade or LinhaUni is the company responsible for the construction and operation of São Paulo Metro Line 6-Orange for 24 years (2020–2044), through a public-private partnership concession, in partnership with the Government of the State of São Paulo. Its main associate is Spanish group Acciona.

Line 6, in its first phase, will have 15.3 km (9.5 mi) of extension, and will connect stations Brasilândia and São Joaquim, being completely underground.

== LinhaUni rolling stock ==
Line 6 will have a rolling stock of 22 trains, with 6 cars each, to be made by Alstom.

== See also ==
- Line 6 (São Paulo Metro)
- Acciona
