= São Joaquim (São Paulo Metro) =

São Paulo Metro station

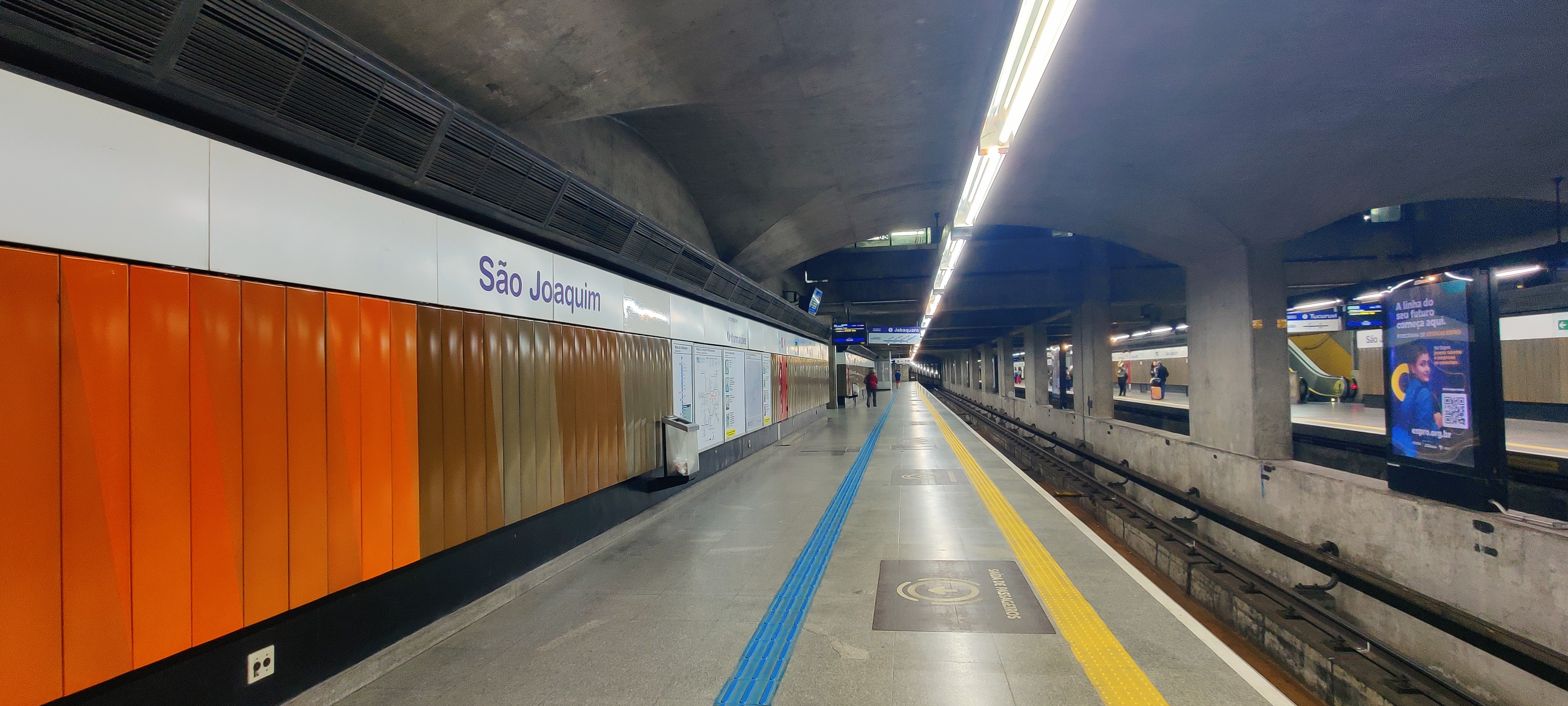
- Station platforms

General information
- Location: Av. Liberdade, 1033; São Paulo; Brazil
- Coordinates: 23°33′43″S 46°38′19″W
- Owner: Government of the State of São Paulo
- Operator: Companhia do Metropolitano de São Paulo; LinhaUni
- Platforms: Side platforms

Construction
- Structure type: Underground
- Accessible: Yes

Other information
- Station code: JQM

History
- Opened: February 17, 1975
- Opening: 2027

Passengers
- 30,000/business day

Services
Preceding station	São Paulo Metro	Following station
Japão-Liberdade towards Tucuruvi	Line 1	Vergueiro towards Jabaquara
Bela Vista towards Brasilândia	Line 6	Terminus
Track layout
Line 1
Line 6
Location

São Joaquim is a metro station on Line 1 (Blue) and a future metro station on the planned Line 6 (Orange) of the São Paulo Metro located in the Liberdade district of São Paulo, Brazil.
