= Rodovia dos Bandeirantes =

Highway in São Paulo

SP-348
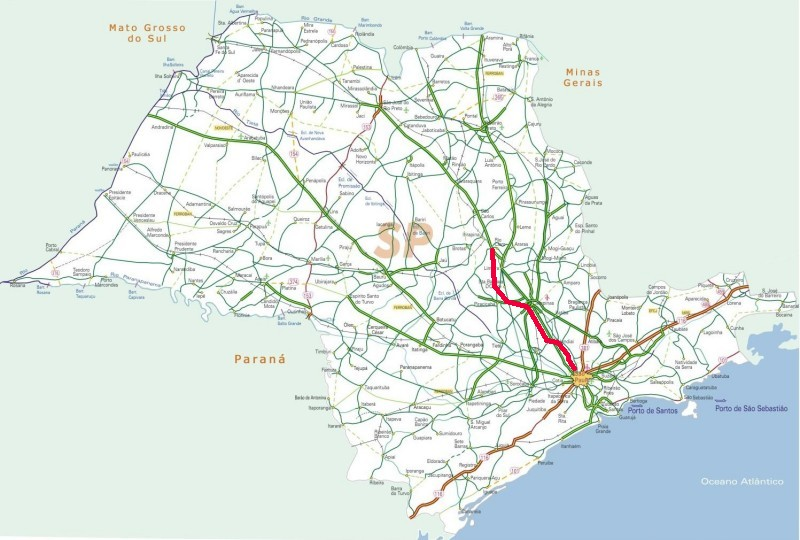
- Native name: Rodovia dos Bandeirantes (Portuguese)
- Type: From São Paulo to Jundiaí eight-lane highway, from Jundiaí to Santa Bárbara d'Oeste six-lane highway, from Santa Bárbara d'Oeste to Cordeirópolis four-lane highway
- Length: 173 km (107 mi)
- Location: Passes through São Paulo, Jundiaí, Campinas, Sumaré, Santa Bárbara d'Oeste, Limeira, Cordeirópolis
- South end: Marginal Tietê Lapa, in the city of São Paulo
- Major junctions: SP 330 (Rodovia Anhangüera, km 47; SP 304 Rodovia Luiz de Queiroz, km 134; SP 310 (Rodovia Washington Luís), km 156
- North end: Cordeirópolis, in the Rodovia Anhangüera, km 158

Construction
- Inauguration: 1978 and 2001

The Rodovia Bandeirantes (official designation SP-348) is a highway in the state of São Paulo, Brazil.

Once the traffic capacity of the Anhangüera Highway was exceeded in the 1960s, the state government decided to build another highway, with a much higher capacity and modern design, directly connecting São Paulo City to Jundiaí, Campinas and merging into the Anhangüera just after Campinas. Among the first six-lane highways in Brazil, it opened to traffic in 1978.

It has always been a toll road, and since 1998, the highway is managed by a state contract with a private company, AutoBan. The highway features many roadside establishments, including Lago Azul, Frango Assado and Rede Graal.

Subsequently, in 2001 it was extended to Santa Bárbara d'Oeste merging with the Washington Luis Highway, to Rio Claro, São Carlos, Araraquara and São José do Rio Preto. In 2006, it was widened to 4 lanes each way between São Paulo and Jundiaí. It is today the major thoroughfare between several mighty industrial cities around São Paulo and Campinas, and the Viracopos Airport, the second busiest cargo airport in the country.

The highway is named after the bandeirantes, audacious explorers of the Brazilian hinterlands in the 16th and 17th centuries, whose treks through the rain forests become the templates for the major thoroughfares of the São Paulo highway system.

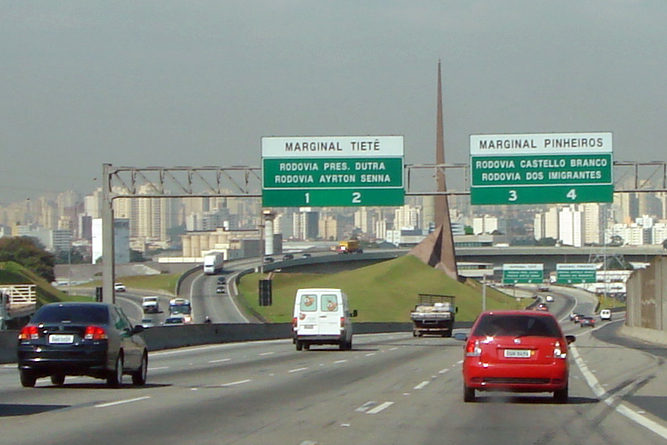

== History ==
The Rodovia dos Bandeirantes was inaugurated on Saturday, 28 October 1978, by then President Ernesto Geisel and Governor Paulo Egídio Martins. Its name is a tribute to the bandeirantes who explored the interior of Brazil from the coast in the State of São Paulo, just in the same route that today is the route.

When the maximum traffic capacity of the Via Anhanguera was reached, around 1960, the state government decided to build another highway with much greater capacity. Built from a modern project (being one of the first highways in the country with three lanes in each direction, currently there are five from São Paulo to Jundiaí). The highway connects the municipality of São Paulo to the municipality of Cordeirópolis.

In May 1998, the then governor of the state of São Paulo, Mario Covas, in a series of privatizations, transferred the administration of the highway to the company AutoBAn, of CCR. In the management of this company, the highway was modernized and extended to the municipality of Cordeirópolis, in an additional 78 km stretch, with access at km 168 to Washington Luís Highway to São Carlos and São José do Rio Preto, and with access at km 173 the Via Anhanguera to Araras and Ribeirão Preto.

== See also ==
- Highway system of São Paulo
- Brazilian Highway System
