= Cidade Líder =

District of São Paulo, Brazil

Coordinates: 23.5578°S 46.4744°W

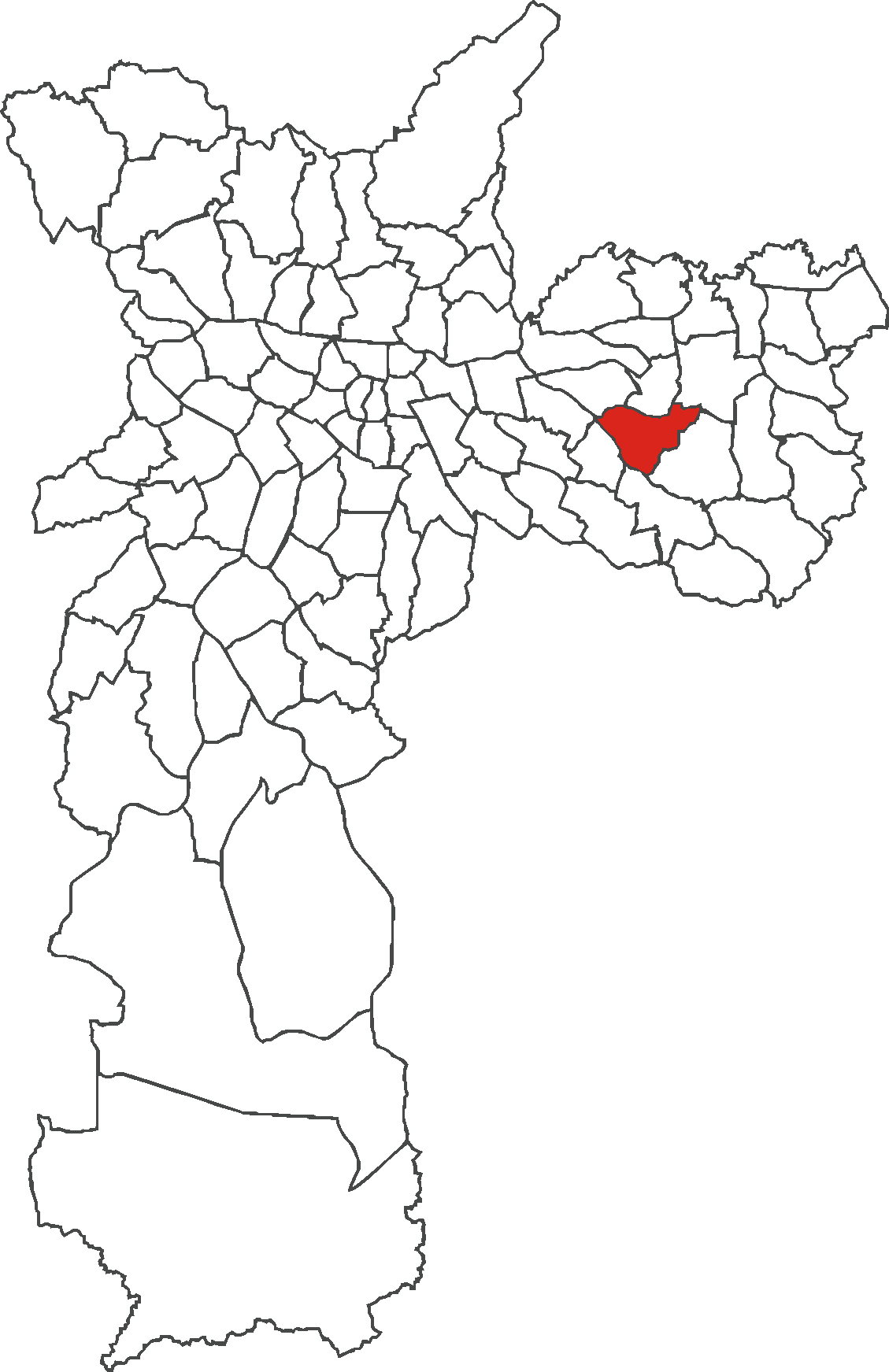
- District of the city of São Paulo
- Country: Brazil
- State: São Paulo
- Municipality: São Paulo
- Subprefecture: Itaquera

Area
  - Total: 10.20 km^{2} (3.94 sq mi)

Population (2007)
  - Total: 126,597
  - Density: 12,411/km^{2} (32,140/sq mi)
- Website: Subprefecture of Itaquera

Cidade Líder is one of 96 districts in the city of São Paulo, Brazil.
