= Acciona =

Spanish engineering company

Acciona, S.A.

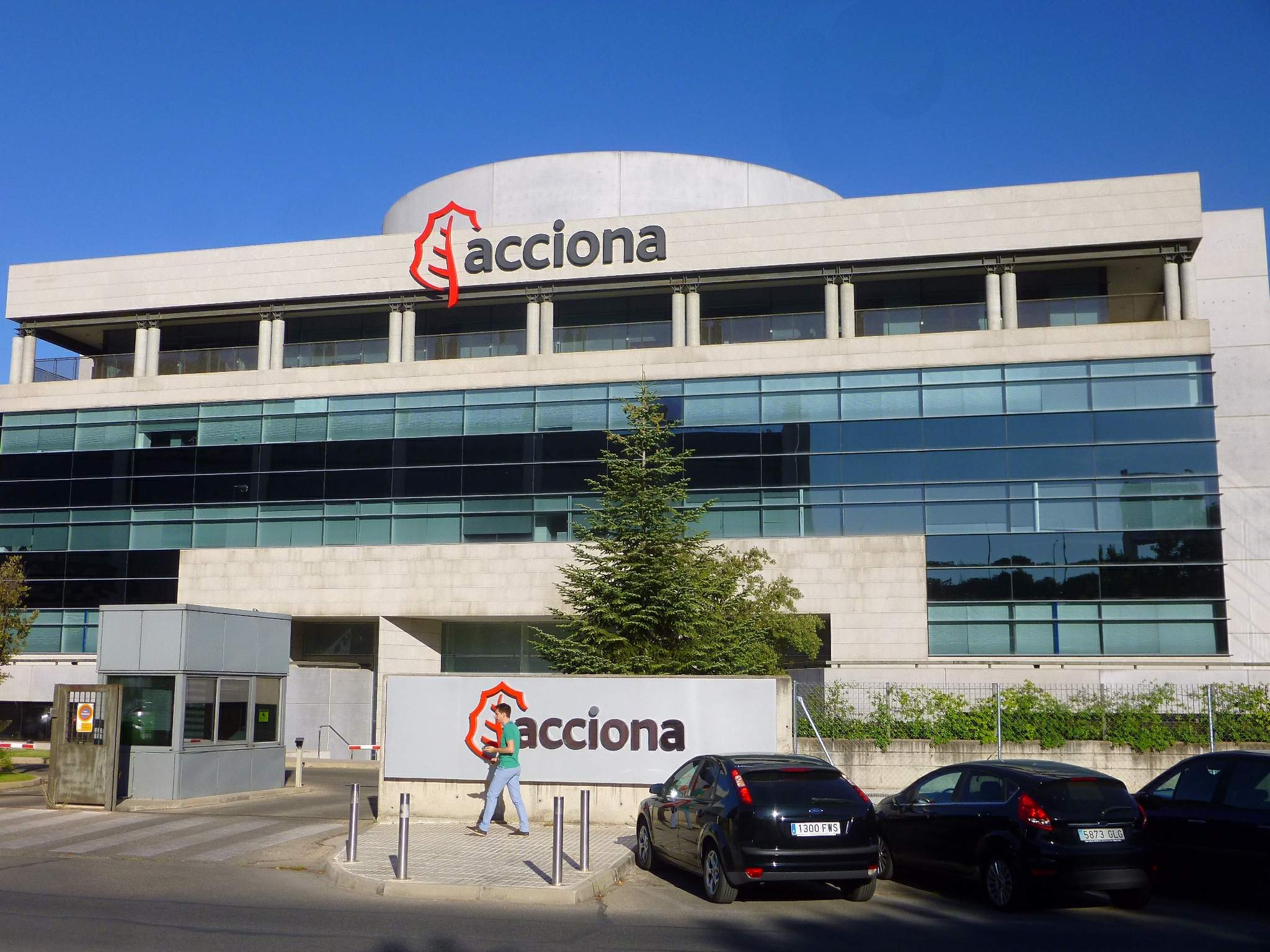
- Headquarters in Madrid
- Type: Sociedad Anónima
- Traded as: BMAD: ANA
- ISIN: ES0125220311
- Industry: Infrastructure (construction, water, industrial and services) and renewable energy
- Founded: 1997 (1931 Entrecanales y Távora)
- Headquarters: Alcobendas, Spain
- Key people: José Manuel Entrecanales (chairman and CEO)
- Products: Infrastructure (construction, water, industrial and services) and renewable energy
- Revenue: ▲€8.104 billion (2021)
- Operating income: ▲€829 million (2021)
- Net income: ▼€332 million (2021)
- Total assets: ▲€19.603 billion (2021)
- Total equity: ▲€5.557 billion (2021)
- Number of employees: 41,664 (average, 2021)
- Subsidiaries: Acciona Energía
- Website: www.acciona.com

Acciona, S.A. (Spanish pronunciation: [aɣˈθjona]) is a Spanish multinational conglomerate dedicated to the development and management of infrastructure (construction, water, industrial and services) and renewable energy. The company, via subsidiary Acciona Energía, produces 21 terawatt-hours of renewable electricity a year.

The company was founded in 1997 through the merger of Entrecanales y Tavora and Cubiertas y MZOV. The company's headquarters is in Alcobendas, Community of Madrid, Spain. The company's U.S. operations are headquartered in Chicago, Illinois.

The company employs 30,000 professionals, and it is to be found in 30 countries on five continents. The company is IBEX 35-listed and an industry benchmark.

== History ==
The company can trace its origins back to MZOV, a firm founded in 1862. In 1978 MZOV merged with Cubiertas y Tejados, a business founded in 1916, to form Cubiertas y MZOV. In 1997 the company merged with Entrecanales y Tavora, a firm founded in 1931, to form NECSO Entrecanales Cubiertas S.A.. It was subsequently renamed Acciona.

In September 2020, Acciona purchased Lendlease's Australian engineering business.

In July 2022, the company was fined €29.4 million, along with five other contractors, by the Comisión Nacional de los Mercados y la Competencia (CNMC) for bidding collusion in public tenders for building and civil infrastructure works.

== Operations ==
The group is organised as follows:

- Infrastructure
- Energy - through Acciona Energy
- Water
- Other Businesses

== Sustainability indexes ==
Acciona obtained the distinctive RobecoSAM Silver Class 2015 in the Electric Utilities sector under the Sustainability Yearbook 2015 for its best practices in sustainability. It has also been included in the CDP Climate Leadership Index 2014 Performance index, which lists the 187 world companies that have received the highest rating for its performance in the fight against climate change.

== Major projects ==
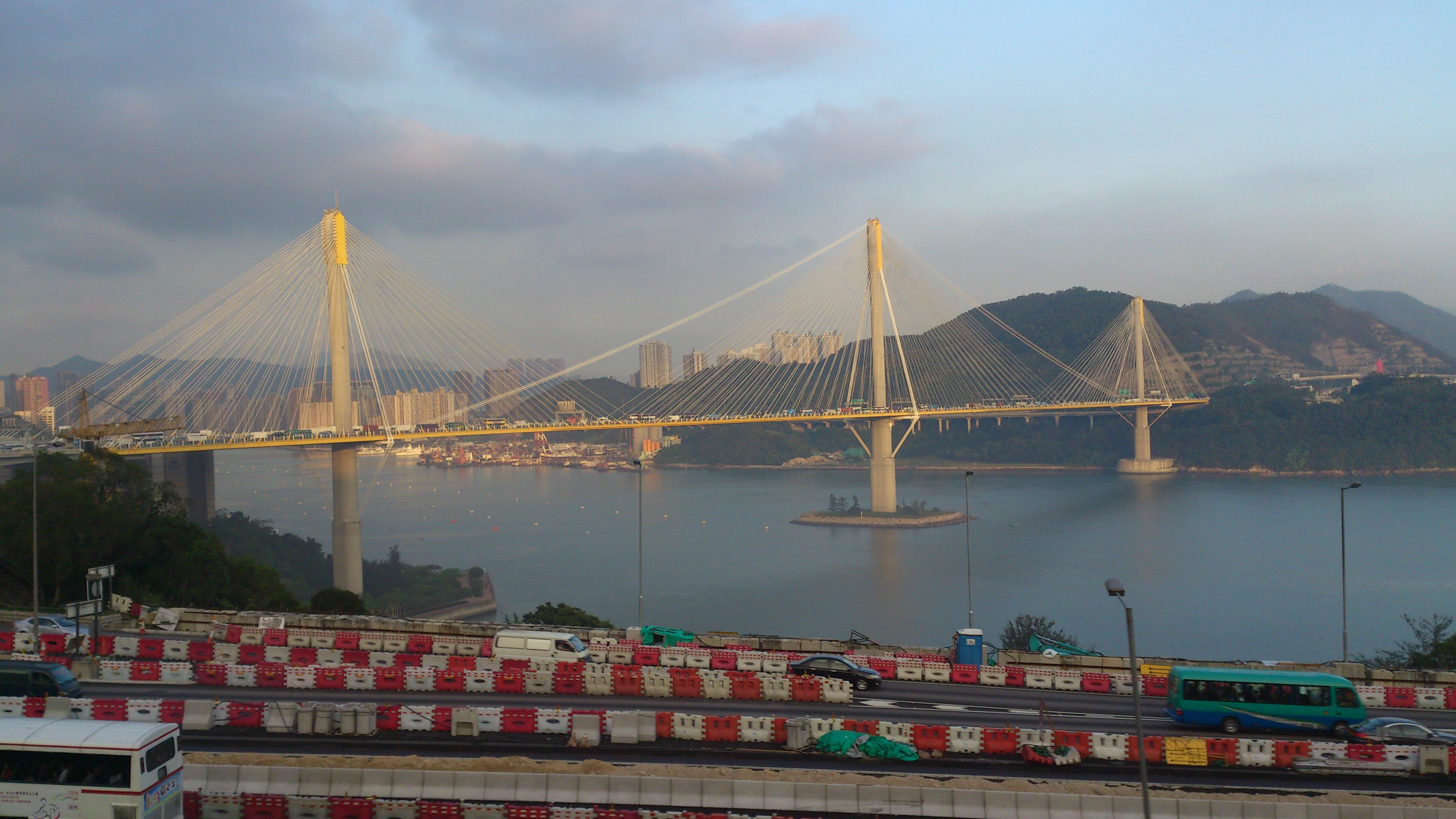
Ting Kau Bridge in Hong Kong

Major projects involving the company include the Torre Europa completed in 1985, the Ting Kau Bridge in Hong Kong completed in 1998, the Gare do Oriente in Lisbon completed in 1998, El Museu de les Ciències Príncipe Felipe completed in 2000, the German Chancellery completed in 2001, the King Abdullah University Hospital completed in 2002, the Alqueva Dam completed in 2002, and the El Palau de les Arts Reina Sofía completed in 2005.

As part of a Public Private Partnership with the New South Wales State Government, Acciona was responsible for delivering the infrastructure for the Sydney CBD and South East Light Rail project which was completed in April 2020. Acciona is suing the government seeking $1.1 billion in additional funding, claiming the government minimized the amount of subterranean utility works that would be required.

Another Public Private Partnership has been signed with the São Paulo State Government under which Acciona undertook the construction works for and operate São Paulo Metro Line 6-Orange which is due to be partially opened in 2026.

In January 2018 Acciona signed a 100 million euros loan with the European Investment Bank. The European Fund for Strategic Investments is a European Union initiative designed to provide financial support for innovative companies. EFSI works with companies which are considered risky because their untested technologies or have products with a limited track record. Acciona will use the loan to expand its research in renewable energy, infrastructure, water and digitalisation to increase efficiency in the construction and operation of its electricity-generation plants. It will also develop sustainable biological water treatment and purification processes and develop ways to recycle waste and in building environmentally friendly infrastructure.

The company is testing prefabricated components which are lighter and less expensive to transport whilst maintaining high strength. Acciona built the first lighthouse in the world constructed of prefabricated products, in Valencia, Spain.

In August 2022, the company won a contract worth about 485 million euros for the Victoria Park-Canning Level Crossing Removal Project to upgrade the Armadale line in Perth, Western Australia. This involved eliminating six level crossings along the train line and rebuilding five stations.

== Motorsport ==
In November 2020, it was announced that multiple-time World Rally Championship and Dakar Rally champion Carlos Sainz Sr. would team up with QEV Technologies to form the Acciona | Sainz XE Team to join the all-electric SUV off-road racing series Extreme E in the inaugural season with Sainz alongside multiple-time Women's Trial World Champion and Women's Trial European Champion Laia Sanz as the drivers line-up. The team finished in sixth and third in the teams' championship in the 2021 and 2022 seasons respectively. In the 2023 season, the team won their first race in Extreme E in Round 2 at the Desert X-Prix.
