= Brasilândia (district of São Paulo) =

District of São Paulo, Brazil

Coordinates: 23.4697°S 46.6897°W

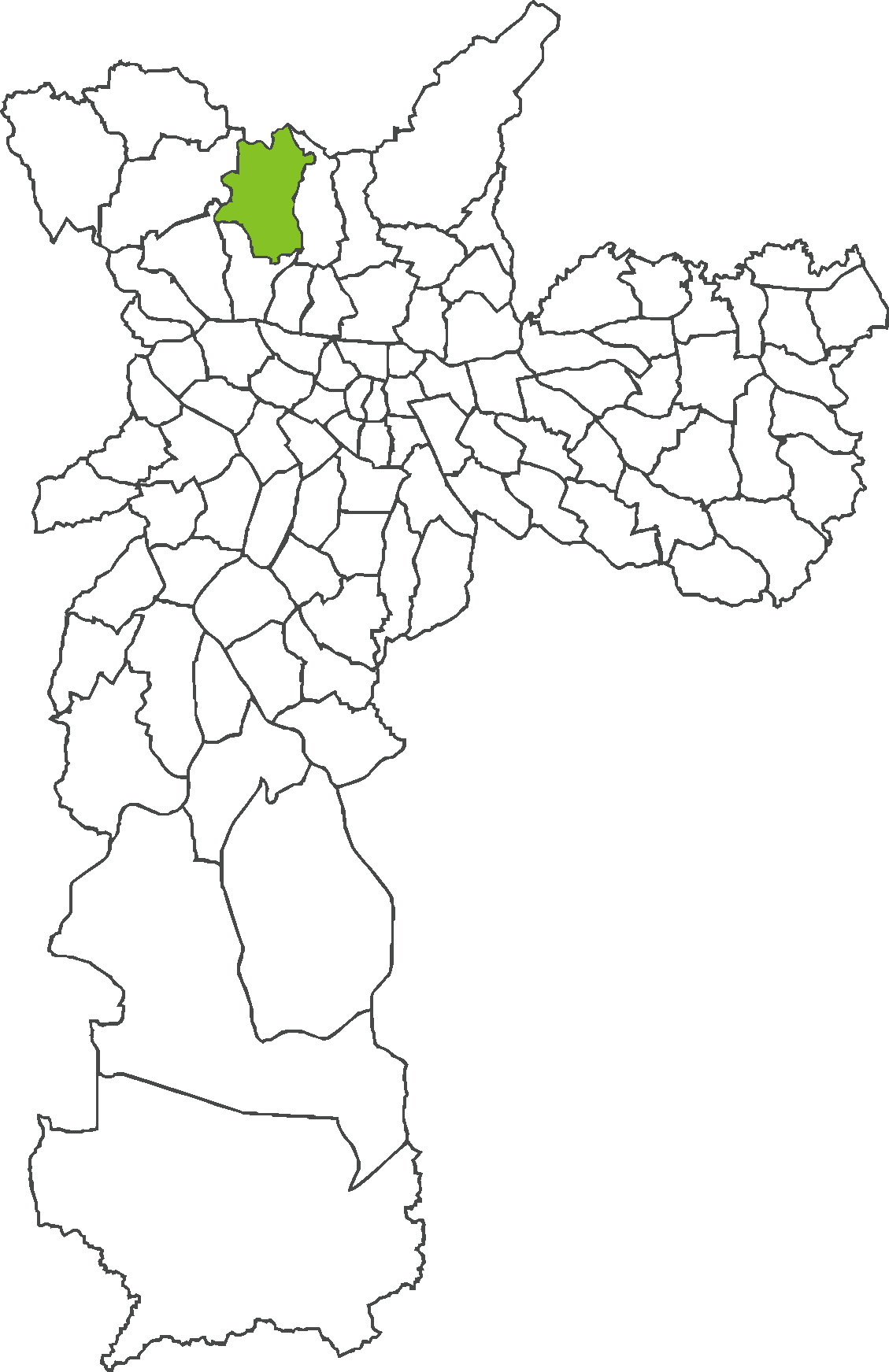
- District of the city of São Paulo
- Country: Brazil
- State: São Paulo
- Municipality: São Paulo
- Subprefecture: Freguesia Brasilândia

Area
  - Total: 21.00 km^{2} (8.11 sq mi)

Population (2007)
  - Total: 264,918
  - Density: 12,615/km^{2} (32,670/sq mi)
- Website: Subprefecture of Freguesia Brasilândia

Brasilândia is one of 96 districts in the city of São Paulo, Brazil.
