= China Railway Construction Corporation =

Chinese listed construction company

China Railway Construction Corporation Limited

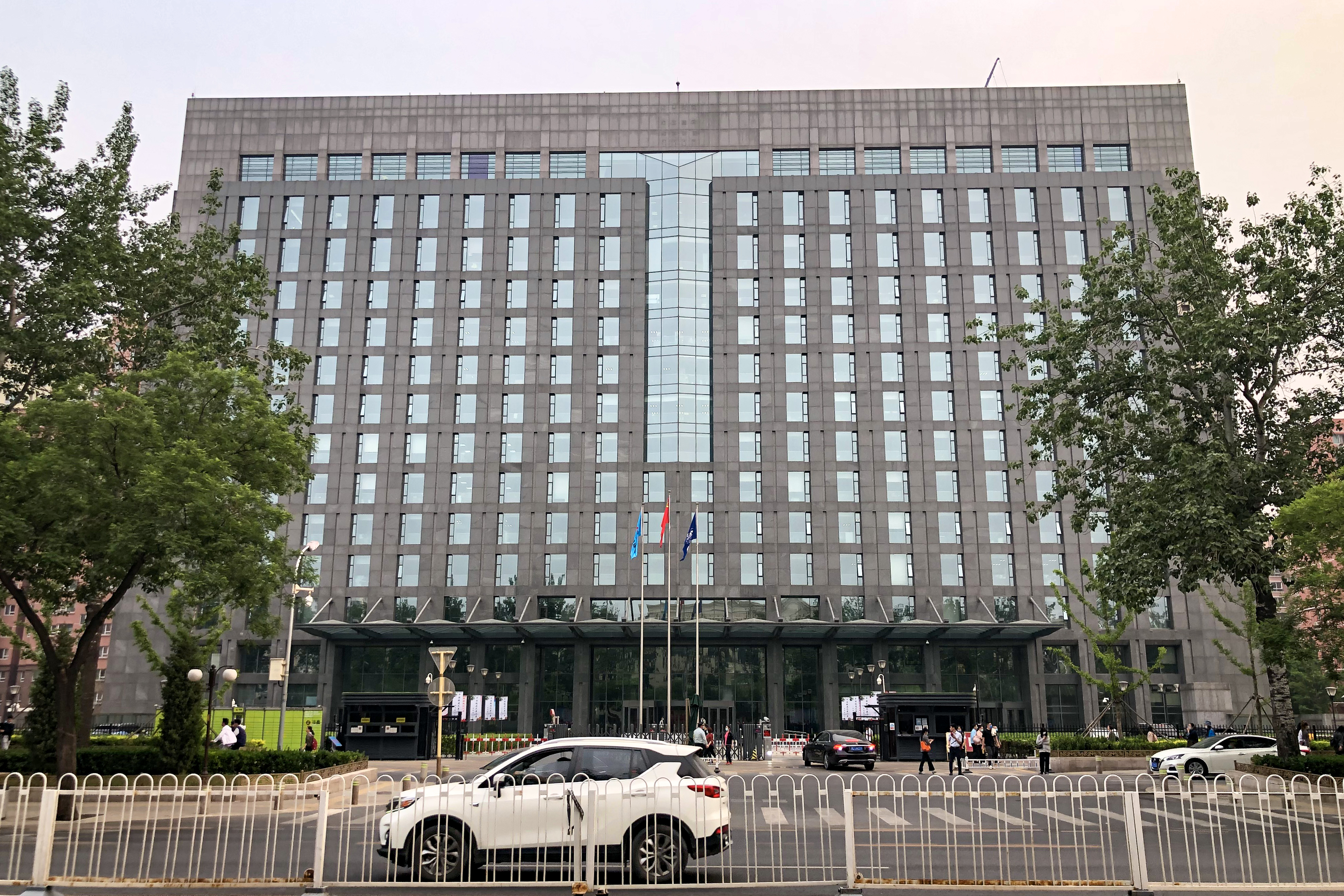
- CRCC headquarters in Beijing
- Native name: 中国铁建股份有限公司
- Romanized name: Zhōngguó Tiějiàn Gǔfèn Yǒuxiàn Gōngsī
- Type: State-owned enterprise
- Traded as: SSE: SSE: 601186 (A share); SEHK: SEHK: 1186 (H share); SSE 50 component; CSI 300 component
- Industry: Construction; Civil engineering; Heavy equipment manufacturing; Real estate development
- Founded: 1948; 78 years ago (as PLA Railway Engineering Corps); 1990 (as holding company); 2007 (as listed company)
- Headquarters: Beijing, China
- Area served: Worldwide
- Key people: Dai Hegen (Chairman & Party Secretary); Wang Lixin (President)
- Products: High-speed railways & urban transit systems; Bridges, tunnels, & highways; Tunnel boring machines & heavy track maintenance machinery; Prefabricated track & turnout components; Commercial & residential real estate
- Services: General contracting & civil construction; EPC turnkey engineering; Surveying, planning & architectural design; Infrastructure investment, leasing & asset operation; Logistics & material trade
- Revenue: ▼CN¥1.03 trillion (2025) (US$153.72 billion)
- Operating income: ▼CN¥36.12 billion (2025) (US$5.39 billion)
- Net income: ▼CN¥18.36 billion (2025) (US$2.74 billion)
- Total assets: ▲CN¥2.08 trillion (2025) (US$311.06 billion)
- Total equity: ▲CN¥340.29 billion (2025) (US$50.8 billion)
- Owner: SASAC (51.13%)
- Number of employees: 250,306 (2025)
- Subsidiaries: CCECC (100%); China Railway Construction Heavy Industry (CRCHI); China Railway Construction Real Estate Group; China Railway Construction Bridge Engineering Bureau

Chinese name
- Simplified Chinese: 中国铁建股份有限公司
- Traditional Chinese: 中國鐵建股份有限公司
Transcriptions
Standard Mandarin
- Hanyu Pinyin: Zhōngguó Tiějiàn Gǔfèn Yǒuxiàn Gōngsī
- Wade–Giles: Chung Kuo Tʻieh Chien Ku Fen Yu Hsien Kung Ssŭ
- Website: english.crcc.cn

China Railway Construction Corporation Limited (abbreviated CRCC) is a listed construction enterprise based in Beijing, China, that was the second largest construction and engineering company in the world by revenue in 2014.

The limited company was incorporated in 2007 in order to float the assets of China Railway Construction Corporation [Group] (CRCCG, simplified Chinese: 中国铁道建筑总公司; traditional Chinese: 中國鐵道建築總公司, or the holding company) in Shanghai and Hong Kong stock exchange. CRCCG retained some assets which was deemed not suitable to float in the stock exchange.

Following the 2022 Russian invasion of Ukraine the company continued doing business in Russia, including discussing building a tunnel to Crimea. For this reason Ukraine listed CRCC as an International Sponsor of War.

== Corporate structure ==
CRCCG is under the supervision of the State-owned Assets Supervision and Administration Commission of the State Council. Since February 2008, A shares and H shares of CRCC are listing on the Shanghai and Hong Kong stock exchanges.

The financial report of the parent company (holding company) is not disclosed. As both parent and subsidiary share almost the same English name, one without the word "Limited" (they have different names in Chinese), the business activities of the holding company was often incorrectly mixed up with the publicly floated limited liability subsidiary by the media.

=== Subsidiaries of CRCC ===
- China Railway Bureau Groups numbered 11 through 25 (the Bureau Groups numbering 1 through 10 belong to competitor China Railway Engineering Corporation)
  - China Railway Construction Bridge Engineering Bureau Group Co., Ltd. (former 13th Bureau)
- China Civil Engineering Construction Corporation (CCECC)
- CRCC High-tech Equipment (CRCCE)
- China Railway Construction Group Ltd.
- China Railway Electrification Bureau Group Co., Ltd.
- China Railway Real Estate Group Co., Ltd.
- China Railway Goods and Materials Co., Ltd.
- Kunming China Railway Large Maintenance Machinery Co., Ltd.
- China Railway Construction Investment Co., Ltd.
- CRCC Finance Company Limited
- China Railway Urban Construction Group Co., Ltd.
- CRCG (M) Sdn Bhd (Formerly known as China Railway Oversea Engineering (M) Sdn Bhd)
- China Railway SIYUAN Survey and Design Group Co., Ltd.

== History ==
=== Founding ===
Formerly the railway arm of the People's Liberation Army (found 1948 and became part of the Ministry of Railways from 1982). Along with China Railway Engineering Corporation, both railway construction super conglomerates were under the Ministry until 2000. The company maintains links to the People's Liberation Army.

In 2003, China Civil Engineering Construction Corporation, another former entity of the Ministry of Railways, was assigned to China Railway Construction Corporation as its subsidiary.

=== IPO ===
In preparation for listing, China Railway Construction Corporation Limited was incorporated in 2007 as a joint-stock company with limited liabilities which received most of the assets of the parent company. 5 Build-operate-transfer projects were not included, namely Chongqing Tiefa Suiyu Highway, Nanjing Yangtze River Tunnel, Beijing Tongda Jingcheng Highway, Xianyang Zhongtie Road and Bridge and Guangdong Chaojie Highway. Later on in 2015 CRCC bought Chongqing Tiefa Suiyu Highway from the parent company, while 20% was retained by Chongqing Expressway Co., Ltd.

The company premiered on the Shanghai and Hong Kong in February 2008, raising US$5.7 billion, making the second largest IPO of that year. The performance was poorer than expected because of poor investment atmosphere from United States subprime mortgage crisis and China's economic macro-control.

=== U.S. sanctions ===
In November 2020, Donald Trump issued an executive order prohibiting any American company or individual from owning shares in companies that the United States Department of Defense has listed as having links to the People's Liberation Army, which included China Railway Construction Corporation.

== Projects ==
=== Domestic ===
CRCC has built much of the transportation infrastructure in China including high speed rail, subways, and expressways.

- Beijing–Shanghai High-Speed Railway, construction began in April 2008 and commercial serviced started in June 2011.

=== Asia ===
- Bangladesh - The Dhaka Elevated Expressway, the first elevated expressway of Bangladesh, is to be constructed by CRCC in a $1.062 billion contract signed with the Italthai Industrial Group.
- Cambodia - The CRCC conducted feasibility studies on railway double tracking and railway electrification in Cambodia, Phnom Penh–Stung Treng–Siem Reap railway, and urban rail (metro and light rail) system in Phnom Penh.
- Pakistan - The construction of Construction on the first new-build portion of the Karachi - Lahore Motorway project between Lahore and Multan costing approximately $1.5 billion was launched in November 2015 as a joint venture between the China Railway Construction Corporation Limited and Pakistan's Zahir Khan and Brothers, Engineers and Constructors.
- Malaysia - Construction of various buildings by CRCG (M) Sdn Bhd including:
  - Four Seasons Hotel, Kuala Lumpur
  - Coronation Square Tower 5, Johor
  - Plaza Rakyat, Kuala Lumpur
  - Dorsett Waterfront Subang, Selangor
  - Coral Bay, Sabah

=== Middle East and North Africa ===
- Algeria - A consortium of CRCC and CITIC constructed the Central and Western sections of the Algeria East–West Highway in a contract worth $6.25 billion.
- Egypt - Track upgrade contract for $600m won by the China Civil Engineering Construction Corporation unit in April 2015.
- Libya - CRCC wins $2.6b bid in 2008 for west-to-east coastal railway 352 km (219 mi) from Khoms to Sirte and a south-to-north railway 800 km (500 mi) long for iron ore transport from the southern city Sabha to Misrata.
- Saudi Arabia - CRCC wins 6.7 billion Saudi riyal contract in 2009 to build the first 18 km (11 mi) of the metro in Mecca. However, due to net loss of the project, the state-owned parent company subsidized the listed company to cover the loss.
- Turkey - A consortium of CRCC and China National Machinery Import and Export Corporation with two Turkish construction firms constructed the Ankara-Istanbul high-speed railway, which opened in 2014.
- UAE - Etihad Rail is a national rail system built by the CRCC. More plans are there to build more rail lines.
- Qatar - CRCC formed a JV with local company HBK and the JV constructed the Lusail Stadium where the final of FIFA World Cup 2022 was hosted along with other games and the final ceremony. The stadium has a capacity of 80000 and is one of the largest in the Middle East and the largest in Qatar.

=== Europe ===
- Russia
  - In 2014, the Mayor of Moscow, Sergey Sobyanin, signed an agreement with the China Railway Construction Corporation and China International Fund to build a Troitskaya line of the Moscow Metro and finance construction by developing real estate at the stations. By 2016, the city was again negotiating with CRCC for construction of the line. Rather than CRCC handing the whole project, the city wanted to split the work between Russian and Chinese workers. The parties agreed not only on construction of the Kommunarskaya line, but also three stations of the Bolshaya Koltsevaya line, Michurinsky Prospekt, Aminyevskoye Shosse, and Prospekt Vernadskogo.
  - In September 2020, a subsidiary of China Railway Construction Corporation International signed a contract for the construction of the fifth section of the Moscow-Kazan national highway with a length of 107 km (66 mi).

=== Africa ===
- Angola - CRCC built a 1,344 km (835 mi) railway line in Angola that opened in 2015 for a contract value of $1.83 bn.
- Mali - CRCC signed a $1.5 bn deal with the government of Mali to improve its railway system.
- Nigeria - The China Civil Engineering Construction Corporation unit signed a $3.5bn contract with the Ogun State in April 2015 to construct a railway line through the state.
- Senegal - CRCC signed a $1.26 bn deal with the government of Senegal for work on 644.6 km (400.5 mi) of the rail line from Dakar to the Malian border.
- Zambia and Tanzania - CRCC signed a $1.4 bn deal with the governments of both countries for work on 1,860 km (1,160 mi) of the rail line to help Zambia export copper and import fuel. The rail project is a rebuilding of a previous railway constructed by China in the 1970s.

== Other business areas ==
The main business activity of the company is in construction and engineering but it is also engaged in real estate development and copper mining.
