= Central Zone of São Paulo =

Coordinates: 23°32′42″S 46°38′18″W

Central Zone of São Paulo Zona Central
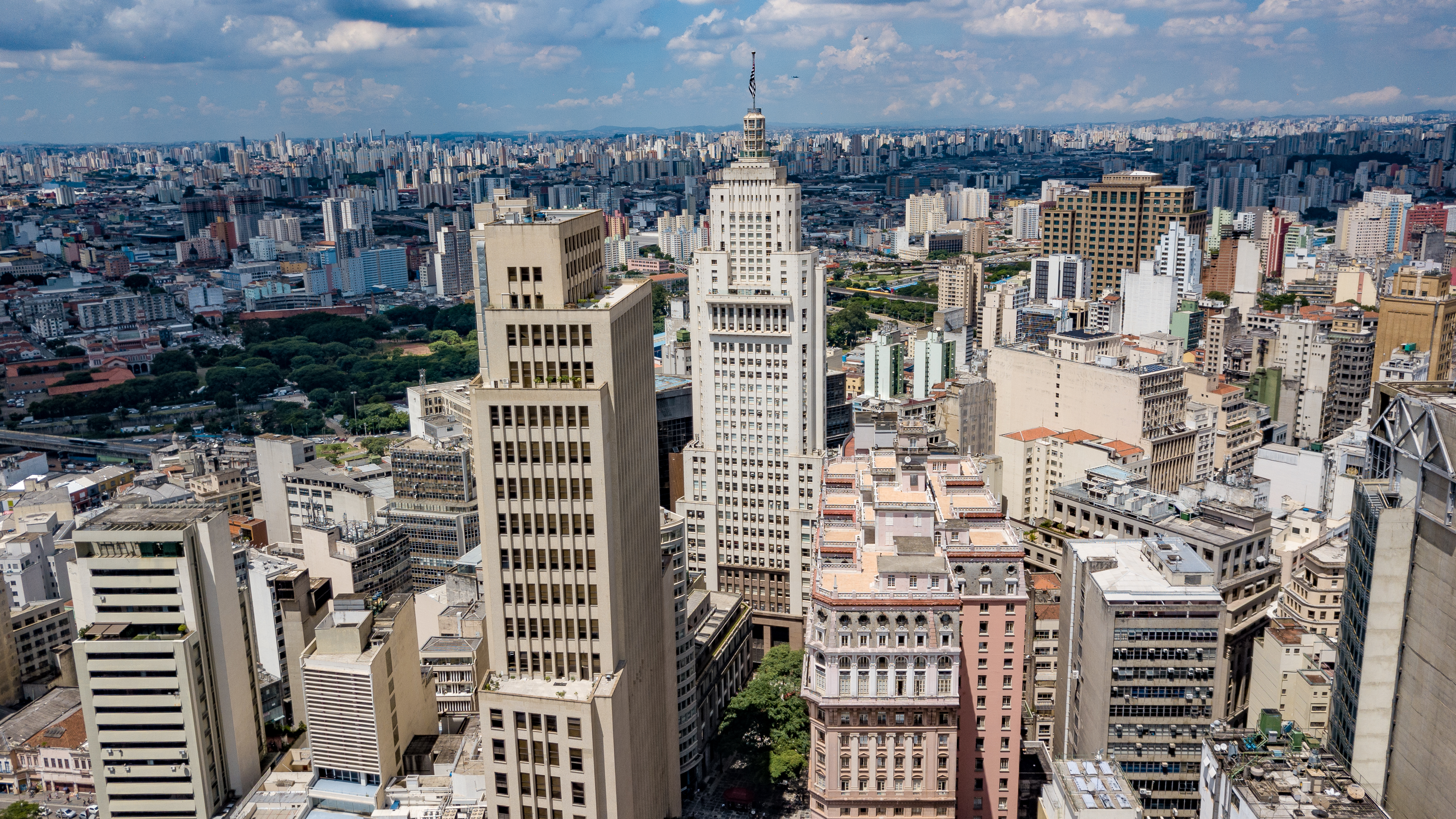

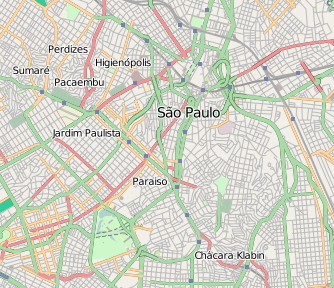
- Location of Central Zone of São Paulo
- Country: Brazil
- State: São Paulo
- City: São Paulo
- Subprefectures: Central Zone: Sé

Area
  - Total: 8.3 km^{2} (3.2 sq mi)

Population (2010)
  - Total: 431,106

The Central Zone (Portuguese: Zona Central de São Paulo) is an administrative zone of the city of São Paulo, Brazil.

One of the largest commercial and business districts in South America, the region is administered by the subprefecture of Sé. It is not concurrent, although often confused, with the regions known as Centro Expandido ("Expanded Center"), a broader area used by the city government for urban planning and road space rationing actions and Centro Histórico de São Paulo ("Historic Center of São Paulo"), which, as the name implies, includes only the oldest part of the central region.

== Limits ==
Officially, the central area is bounded by districts of Municipality Cathedral. However, the social perception of what is called "center of São Paulo" varies and may include other areas of city. Until the creation of the administrative office of the cathedral, the notion of "center" was equivalent to the region of the former administration regional office, who also included the districts of Brás and Pari, currently covered by a Municipality of Mooca. The concept of a central area of São Paulo, however, is wider depending on the study is done about the region and may include items such as financial centers Paulista Avenue and Berrini.

Districts	Population	HDI
Santa Cecília	71,179	0.930
Bela Vista	63,190	0.940
Liberdade	61,875	0.936
Consolação	54,522	0.950
República	47,718	0.901
Cambuci	28,717	0.903
Bom Retiro	26,598	0.864
Sé	20,115	0.858

=== Social Characteristics ===
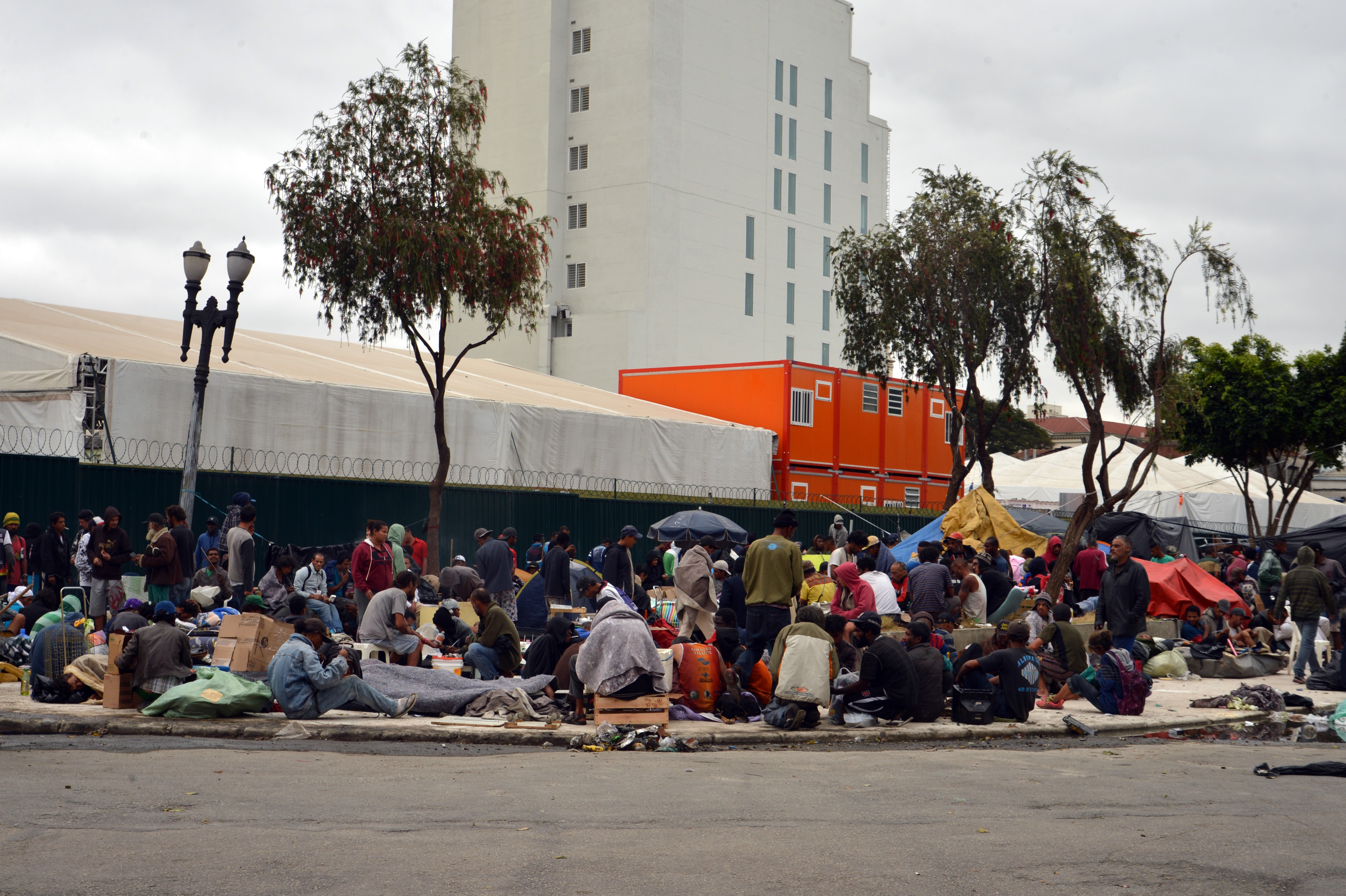
Crackland, in downtown São Paulo.

According to the 2000 census, the total population of the area is 374,002 inhabitants, including the neighborhoods and districts of Sé itself, Bela Vista, Bom Retiro, Cambuci, Consolação, Aclimação, Brás, Liberdade, República and Santa Cecília. It is the least populated administrative region in the city, albeit one with a wider range of public facilities and jobs. The average income in the area is R$ 2335.54, and each year the central area of São Paulo has a rate negative of population growth that reaches 5% per year, according to IBGE and SEADE statistics.

This factor contributed to what has been called degradation the region, as some experts in urban studies, with the removal of the São Paulo elite of the central areas, occurs along the removal of public stewardship, leading to a sense of abandonment. Despite showing an average income higher than that of other regions of the city, it has many homeless individuals and pockets of poverty, such as the region known as Cracolândia (lit. "Crackland"), which has recently been undergoing a controversial process of revitalization by the city government, accused of promoting "social hygiene" through gentrification.

The Centro region is the most well-served by public transportation, with four of the five Metrô subway lines operating in the area, along with several CPTM commuter rail lines. It is also home to some of the major institutions of higher education in the city, as Mackenzie University, The Armando Alvares Penteado Foundation (FAAP) and units of the University of São Paulo (USP), like Law School, The University Center on Maria Antonia Street, and the headquarters of the USP Post-Graduate School of Architecture and Urban Affairs.

== Key points ==
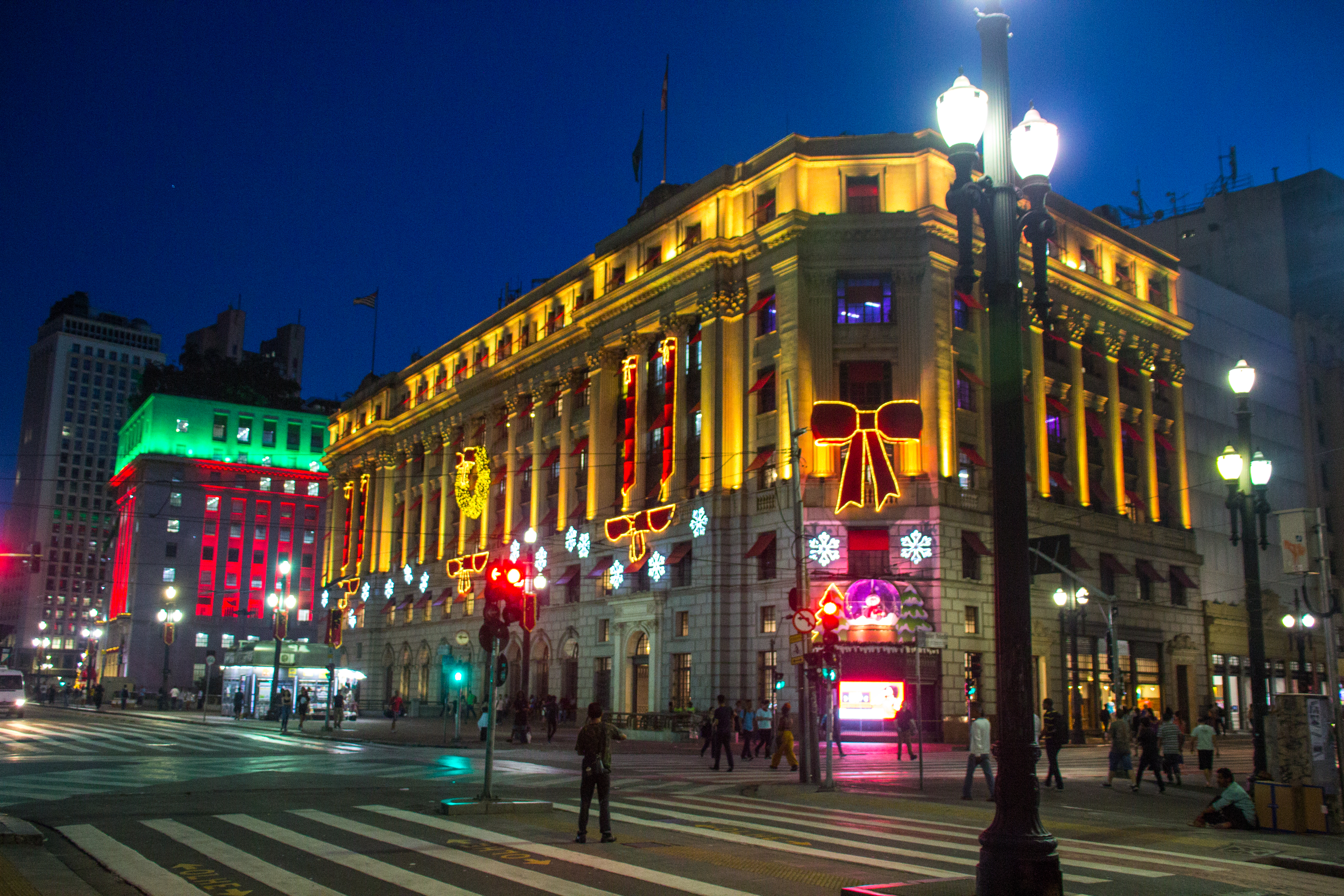
Shopping Light by night

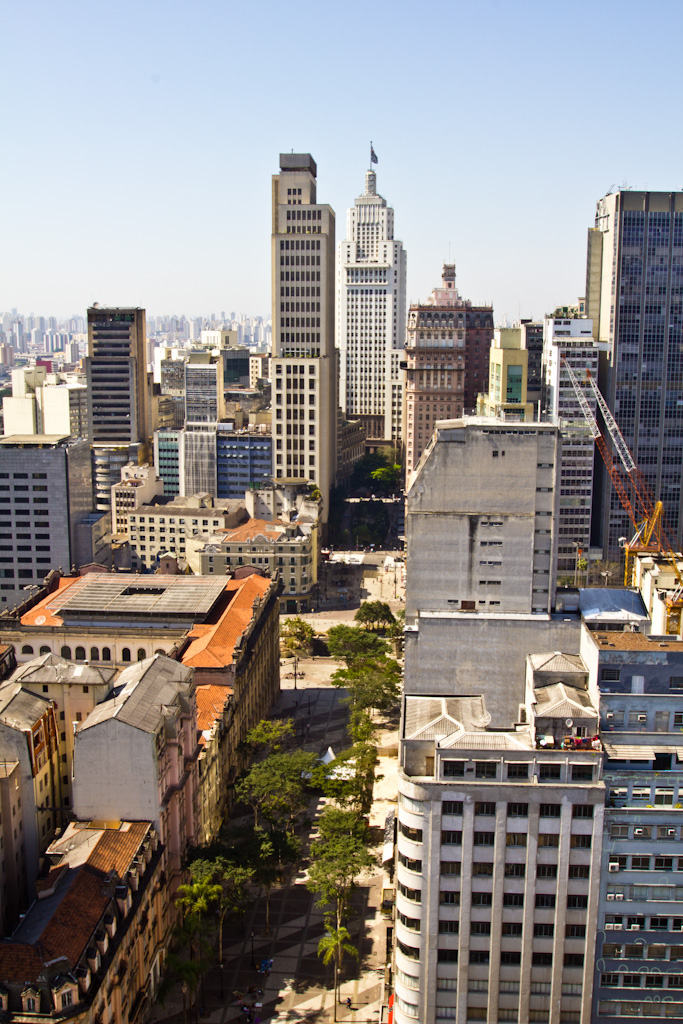
São João Avenue

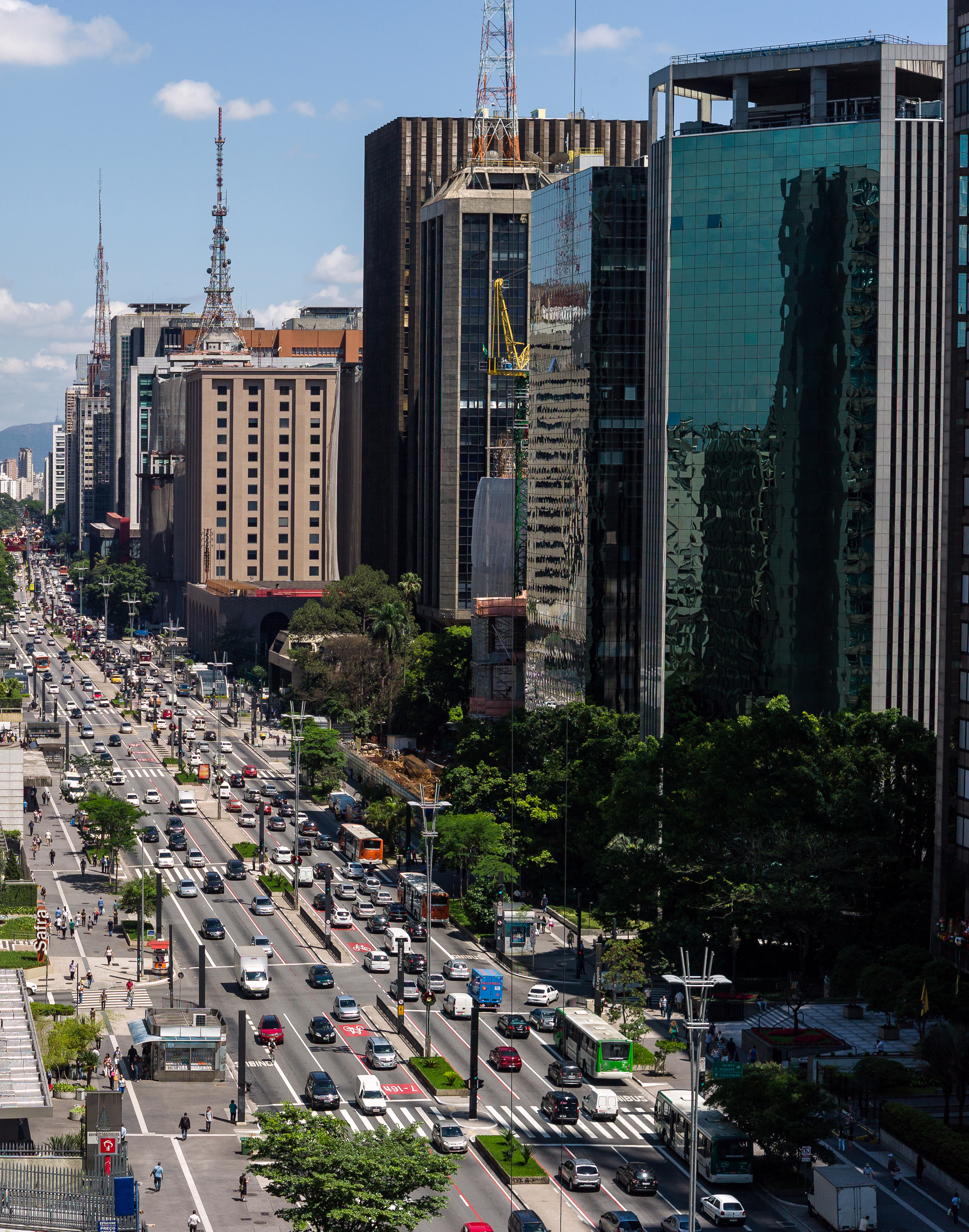
Paulista Avenue

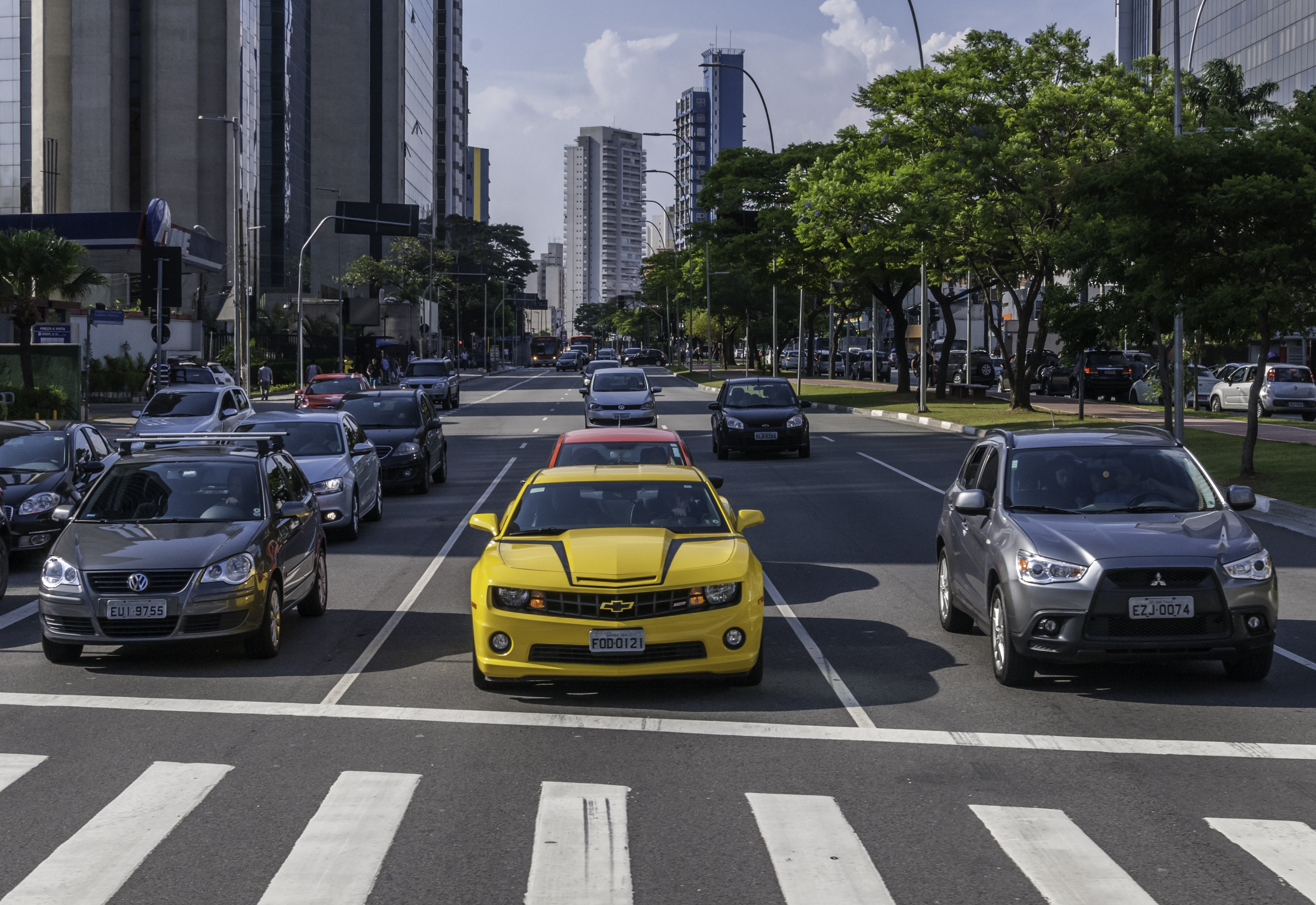
Brigadeiro Faria Lima Avenue

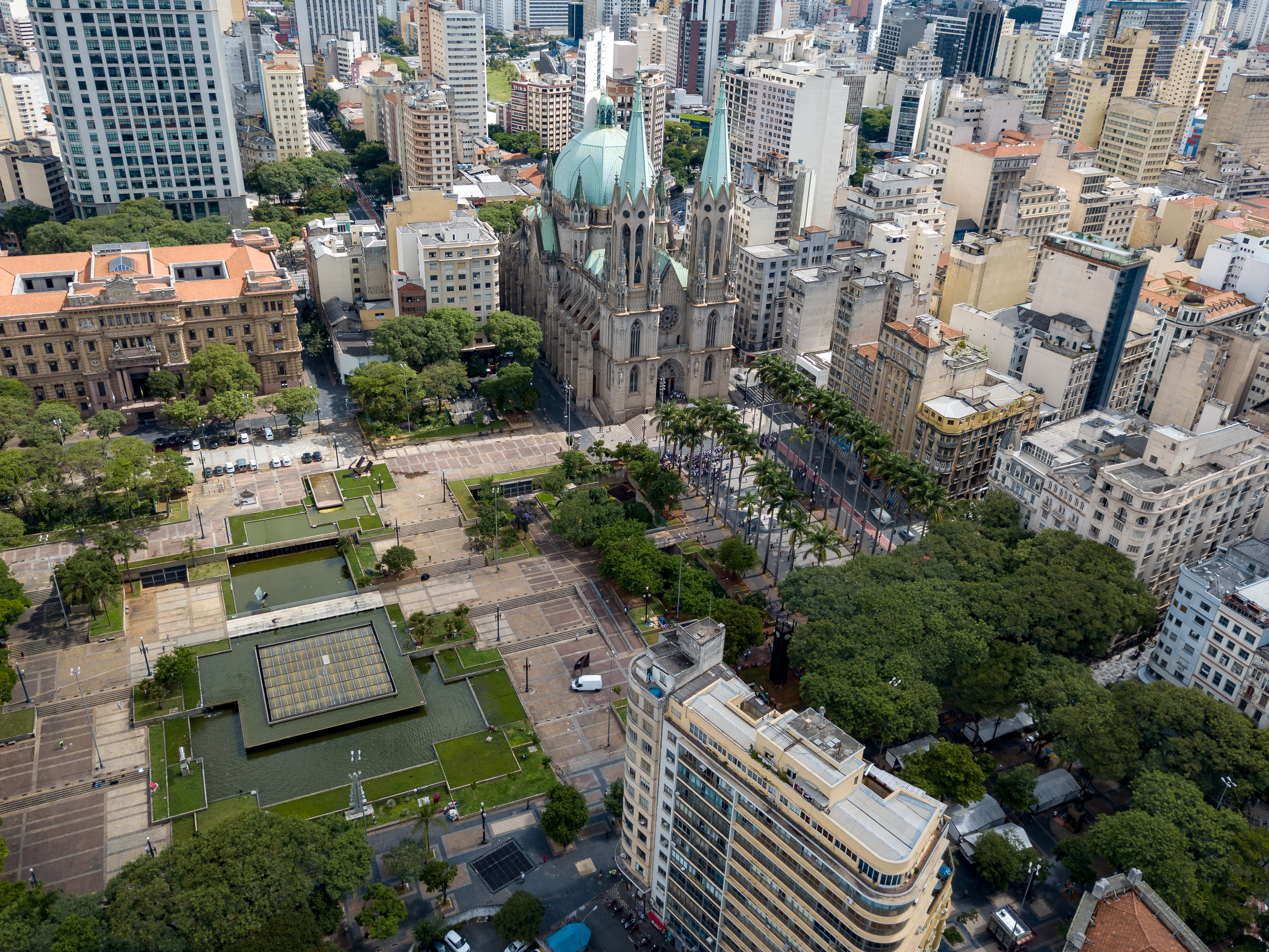
Praça da Sé

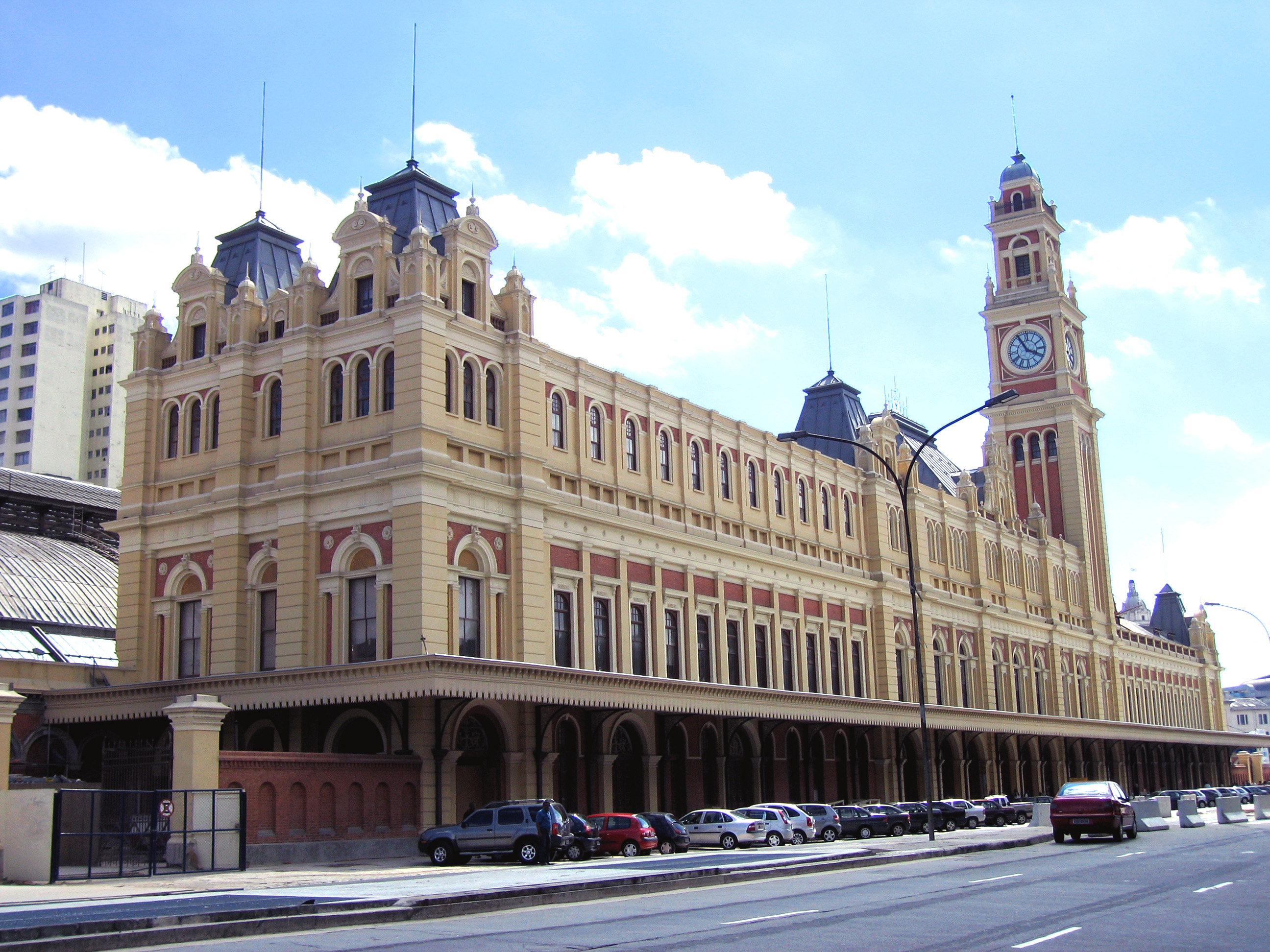
Luz Station

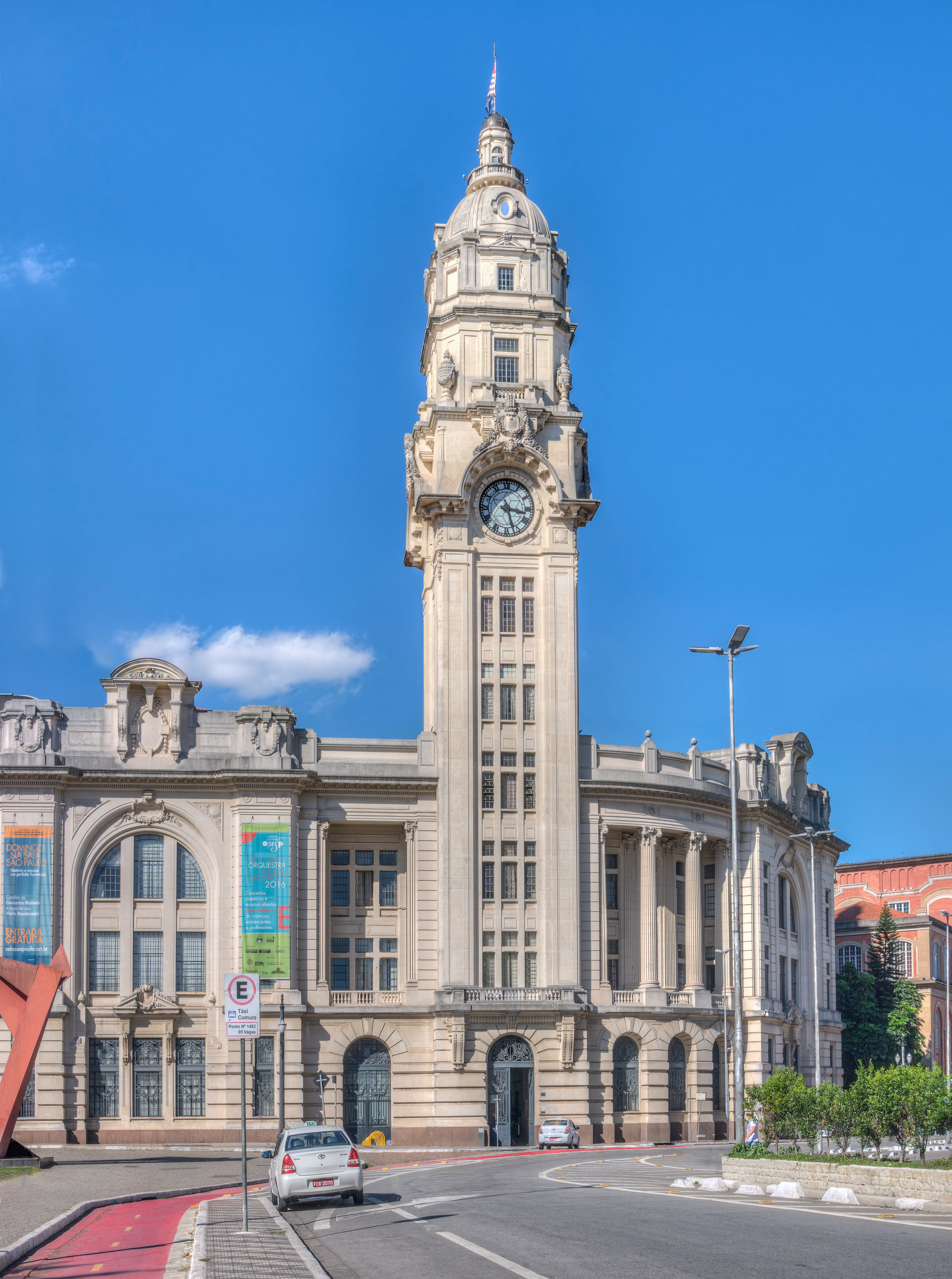
Júlio Prestes Station

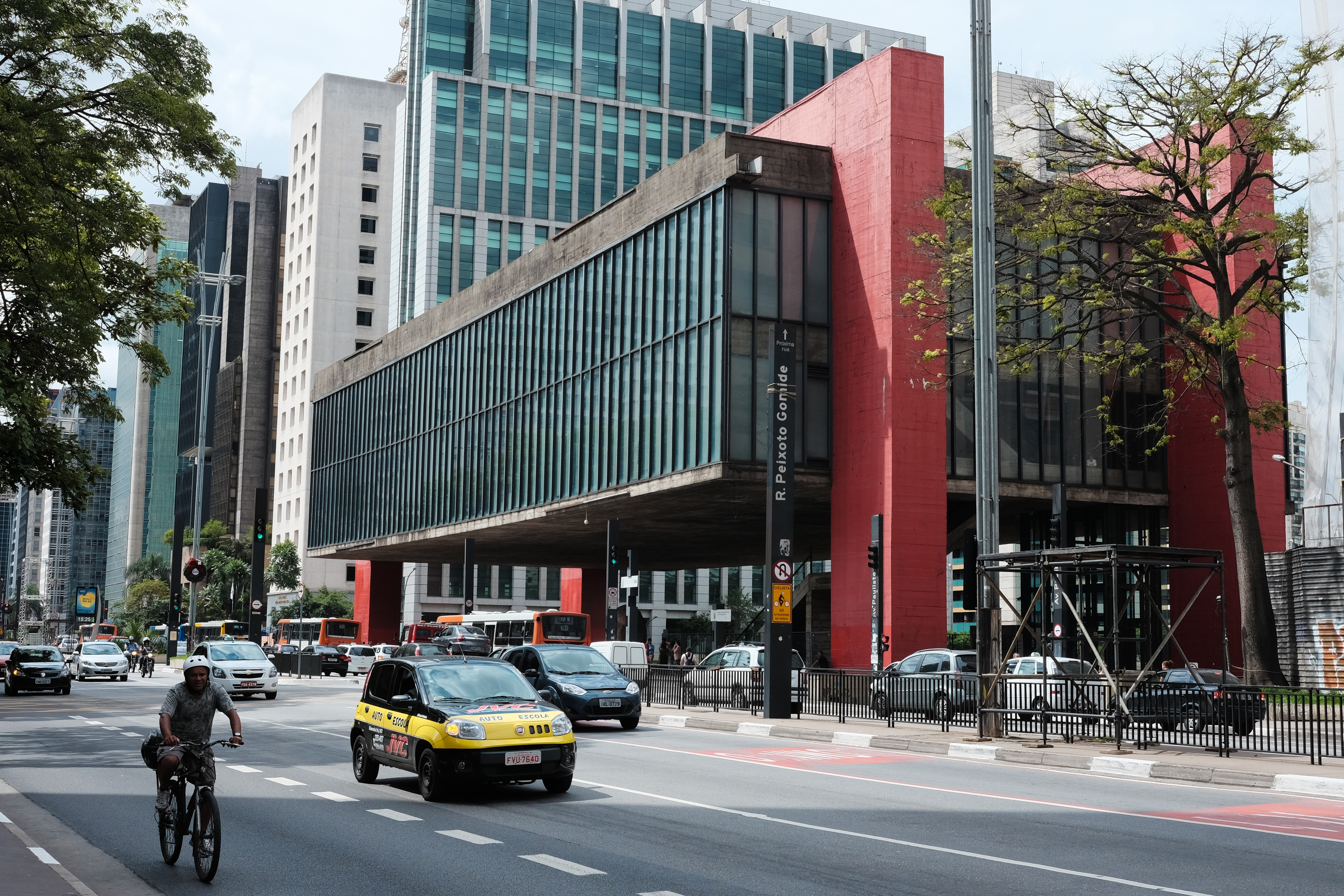
São Paulo Museum of Art

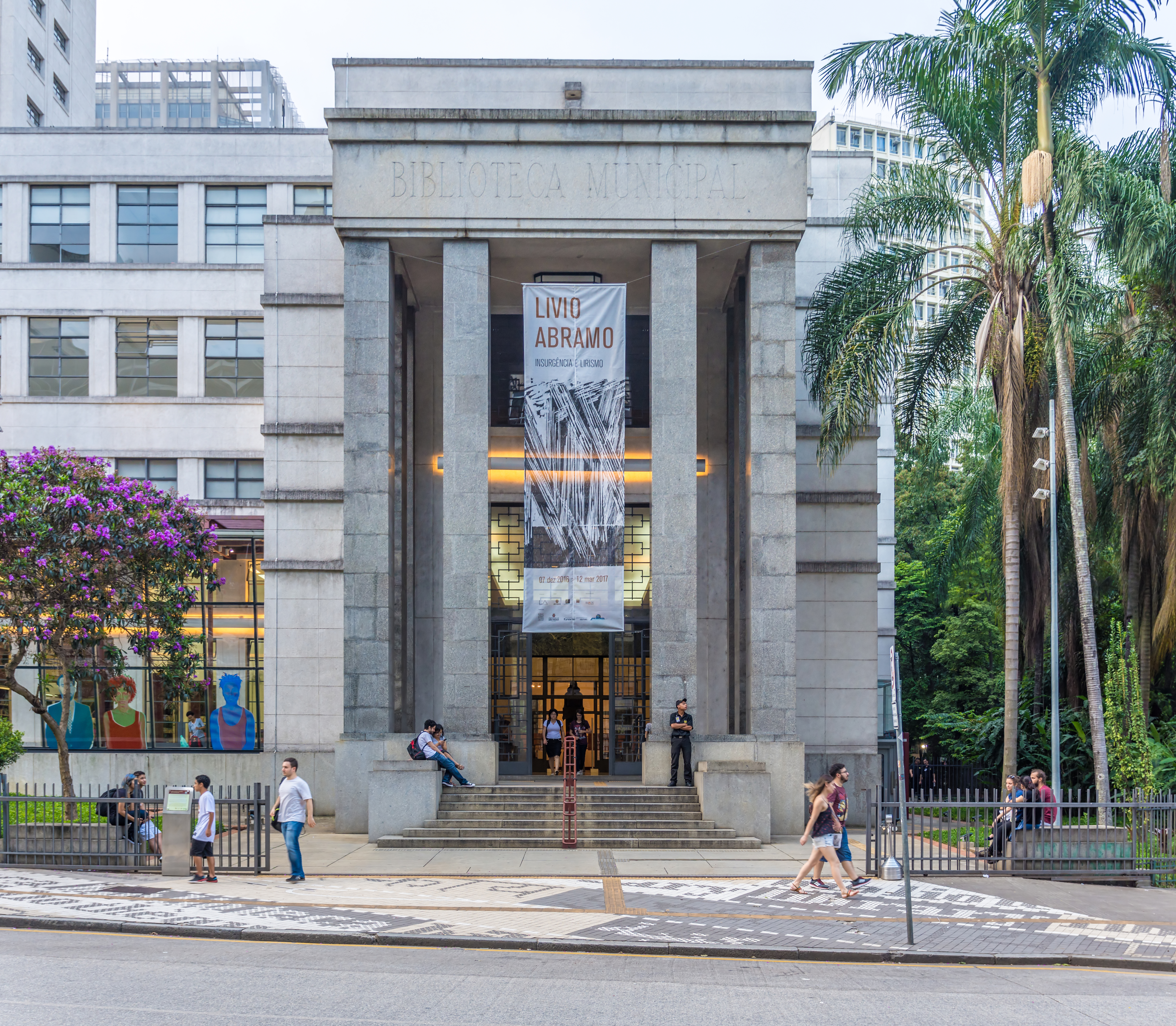
Mário de Andrade Library

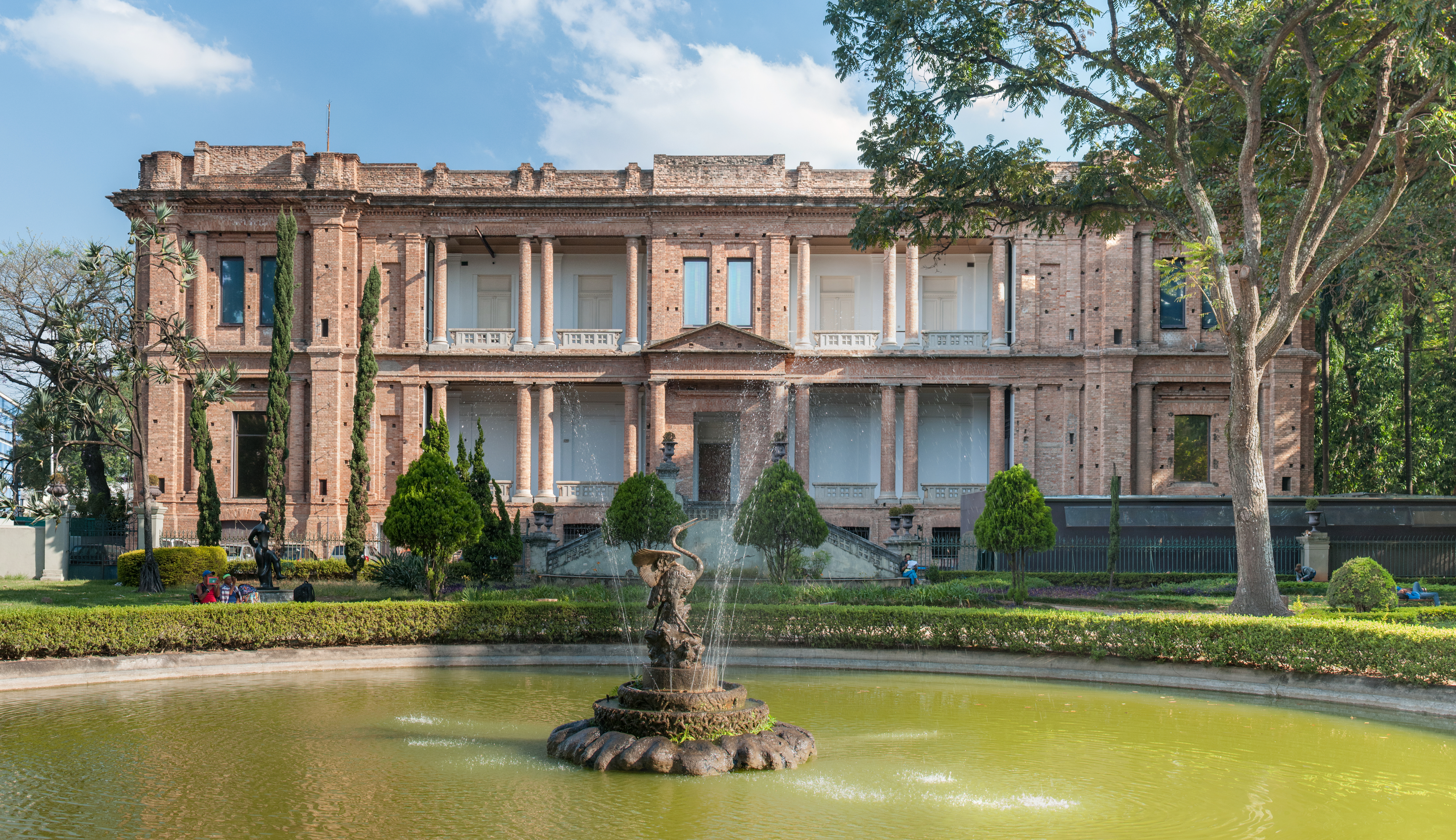
Pinacoteca do Estado de São Paulo

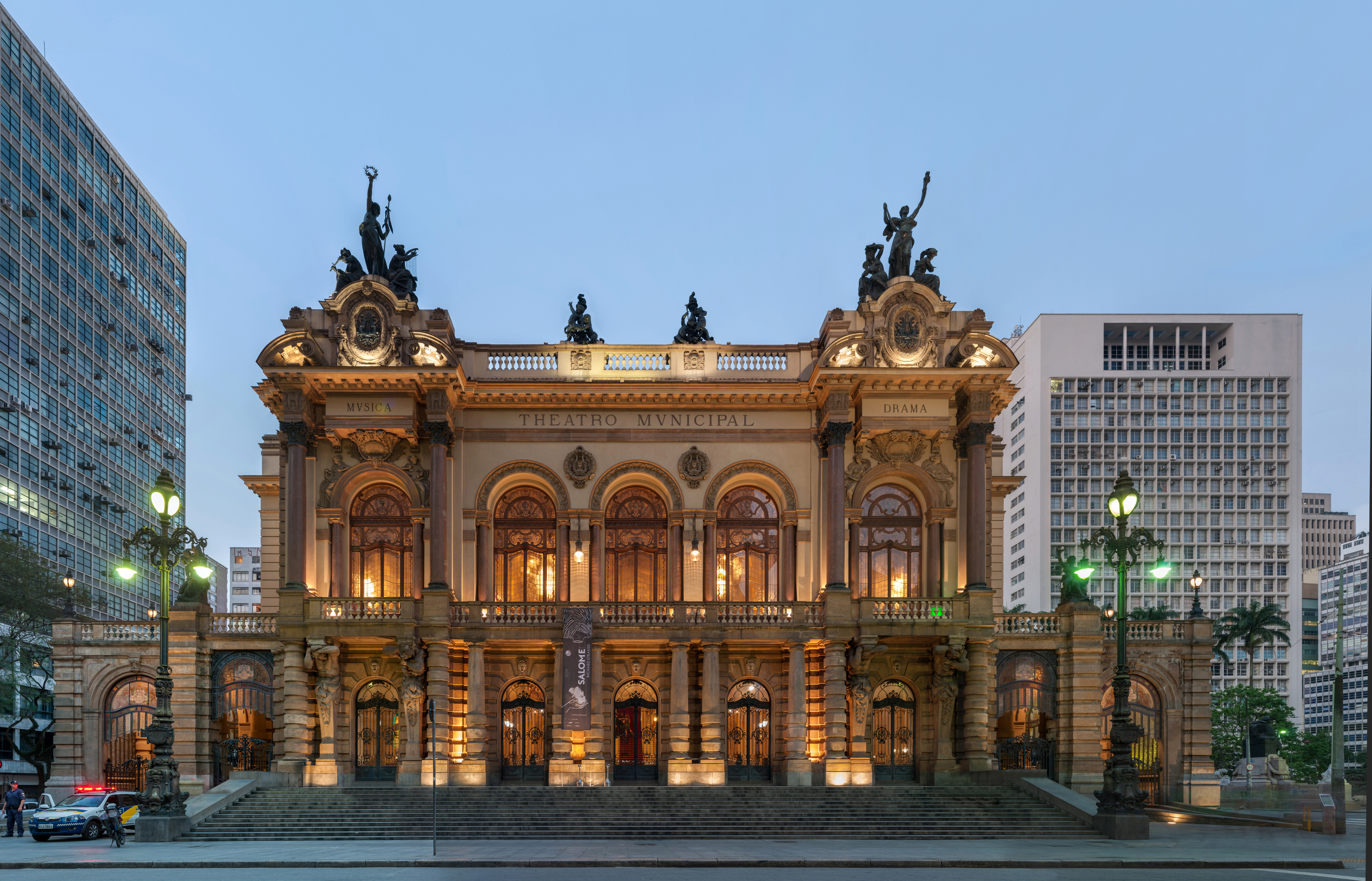
Theatro Municipal

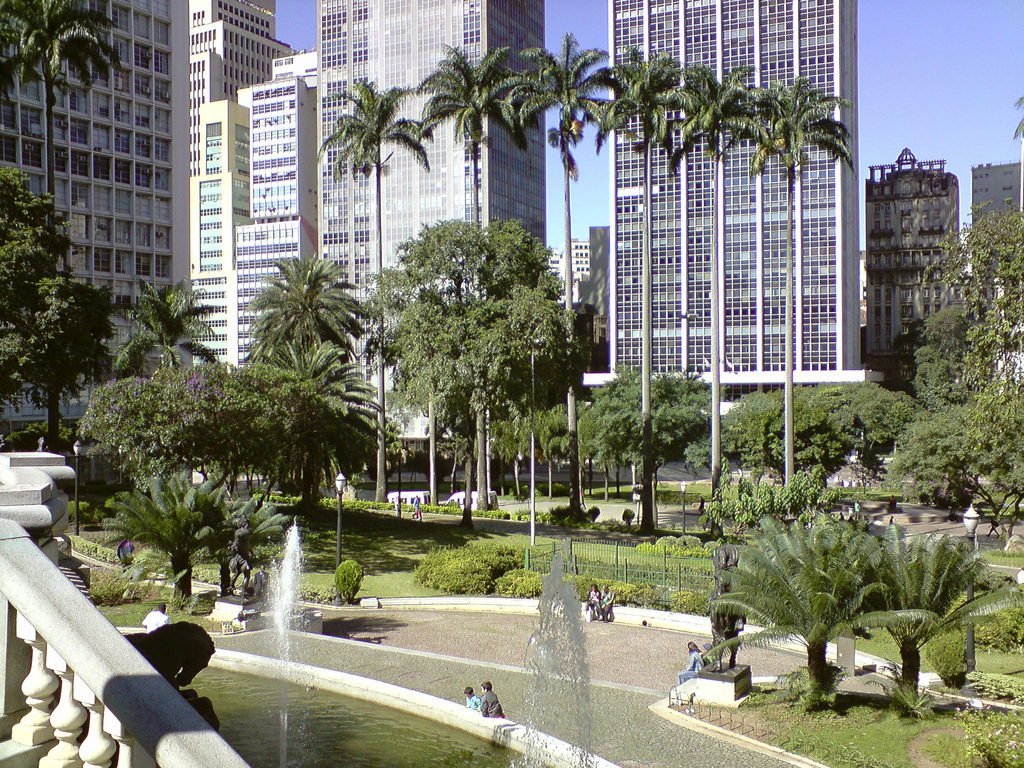
Vale do Anhangabaú

Padre Manuel da Nobrega square

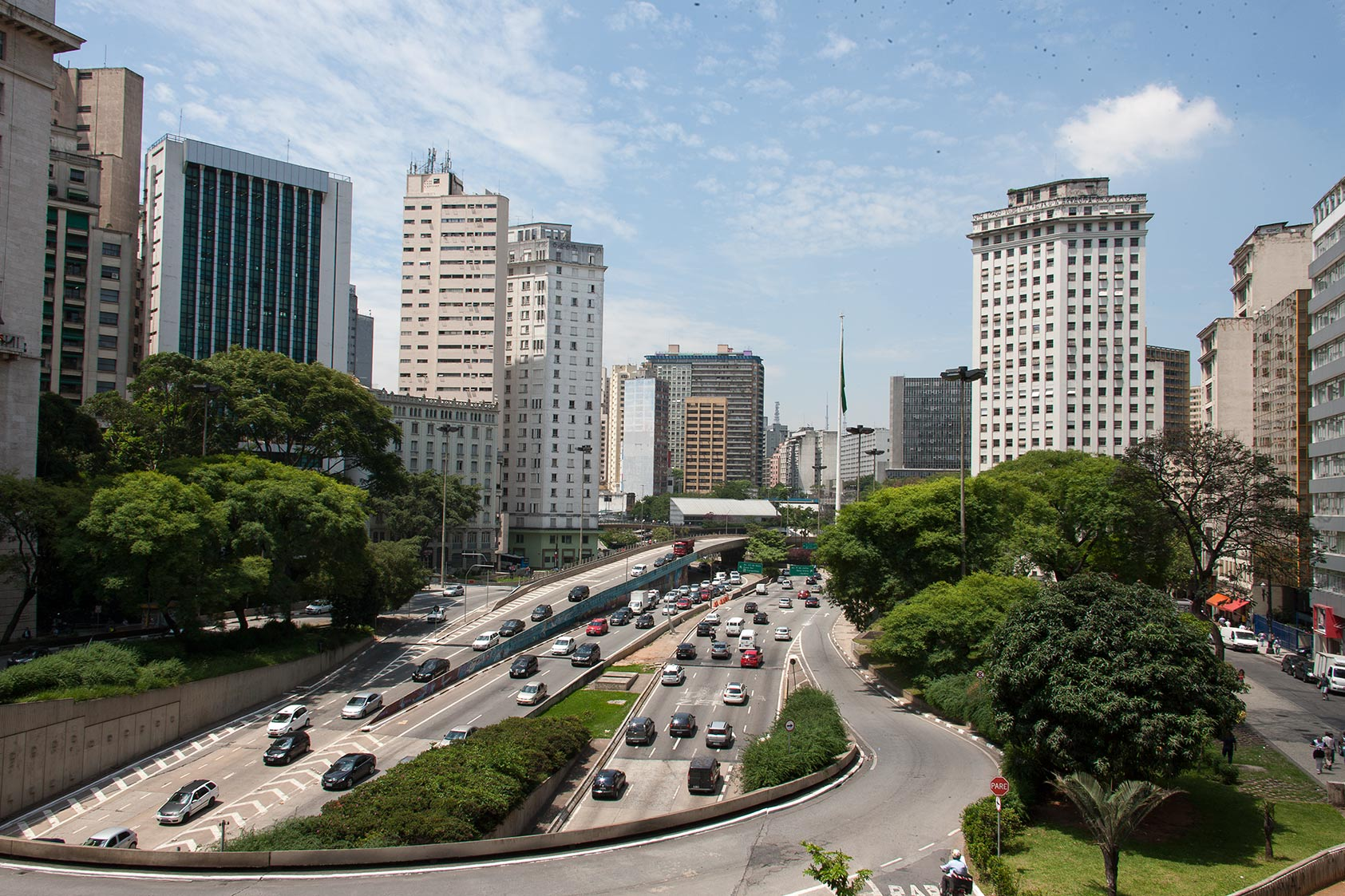
Chá viaduct

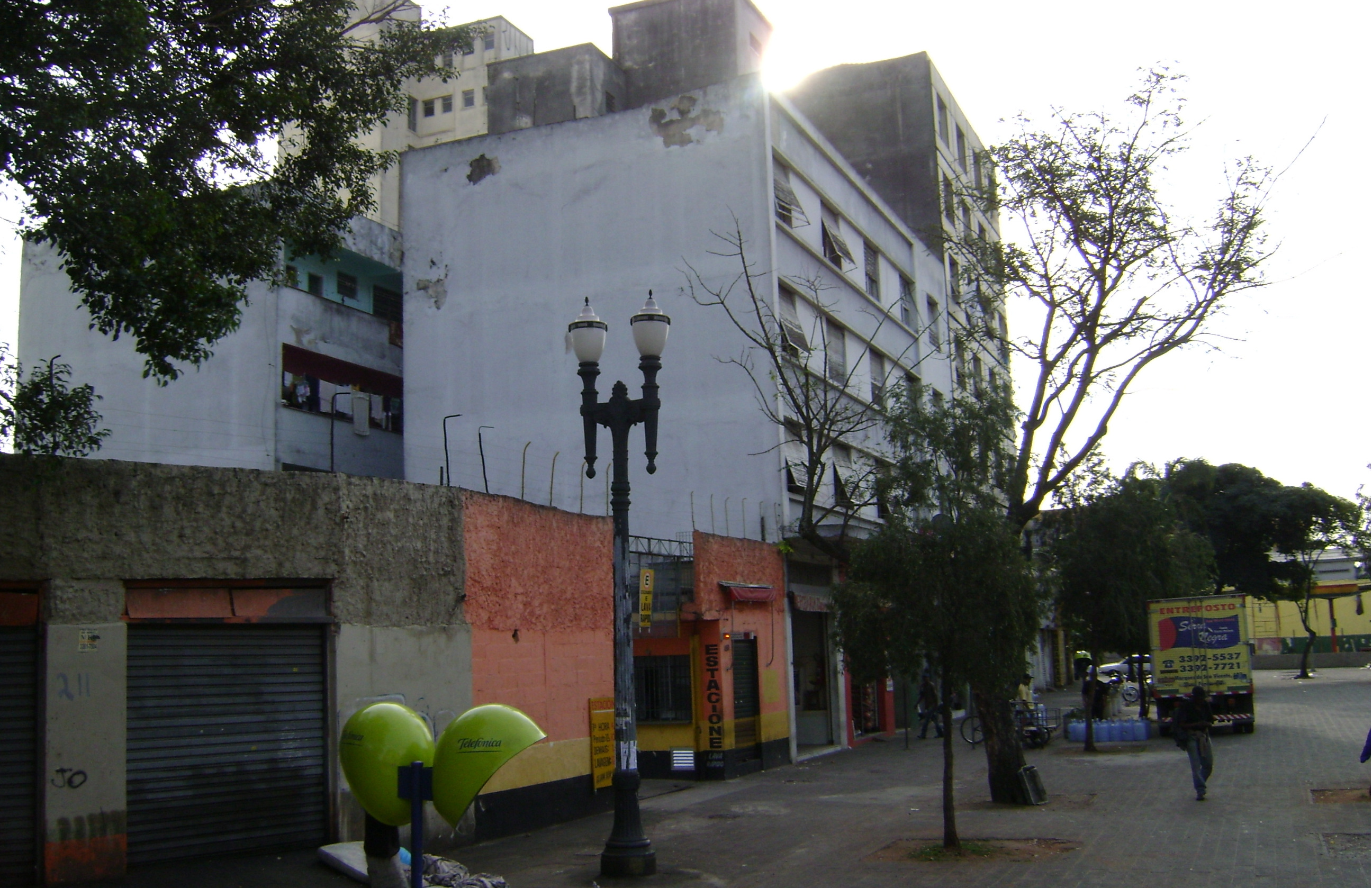
Central Zone of São Paulo.

=== Viaducts ===
- Chá Viaduct
- Santa Ifigênia Viaduct
- Anhangabaú Square

=== Avenue and Streets ===
- Prestes Maia Avenue
- Tiradentes Avenue
- Brigadeiro Luís Antônio Avenue
- Liberdade Avenue
- Estado Avenue
- Avenida São João
- Ipiranga Avenue
- Rio Branco Avenue
- 23 de Maio Avenue
- 9 de Julho Avenue
- Angélica Avenue
- Paulista Avenue
- Conselheiro Furtado Street
- 15 de Novembro Street
- Rua 25 de Março
- Porto Geral Alley
- Consolação Street
- Augusta Street
- Maria Antonia Street
- Dona Veridiana Street
- Higienópolis Avenue
- Carmo Street
- Vergueiro Street

=== Squares ===
- Praça da Sé
- Praça da República
- Praça Doutor João Mendes
- Praça Ramos de Azevedo
- Pátio do Colégio
- Largo do Arouche
- Largo São Bento
- Largo do Paiçandu
- Largo de São Francisco
- Largo da Misericórdia

=== Metro and commuter railway stations ===
- Metro Stations
- Line 1 (Blue)
  - Vergueiro
  - São Joaquim
  - Liberdade
  - Sé
  - São Bento
  - Luz
  - Tiradentes
  - Armênia
- Line 2 (Green)
  - Consolação
  - Trianon-Masp
  - Brigadeiro
- Line 3 (Red)
  - Pedro II
  - Sé
  - Anhangabaú
  - República
  - Santa Cecília
  - Marechal Deodoro
- Line 4 (Yellow)
  - Luz
  - República
  - Higienópolis-Mackenzie
  - Paulista
- CPTM commuter railway stations
- Line 7 (Ruby), Line 10 (Turquoise) and Line 11 (Coral)
  - Luz
- Line 8 (Diamond)
  - Júlio Prestes

=== Major Shopping Centers ===
- Shopping Light
- Shopping Frei Caneca
- Shopping Paulista
- Shopping Pátio Higienópolis

=== Major Parks ===
- Jardim da Luz
- Parque da Aclimação
- Parque Dom Pedro II

=== Colleges and universities ===
- Escola de Administração de Empresas de São Paulo – Fundação Getúlio Vargas (EAESP/FGV)
- Universidade Presbiteriana Mackenzie
- Faculdade de Direito da Universidade de São Paulo (FDUSP) – USP
- Faculdade de Ciências Médicas da Santa Casa de São Paulo (FCMSCSP)
- Centro de Ciências Exatas e Tecnologia – Pontifícia Universidade Católica de São Paulo – (CCET/PUC-SP)
- Fundação Armando Alvares Penteado (FAAP)
- Escola da Cidade (AEAUSP)
- Liceu de Artes e Ofícios de São Paulo (LAO-SP)
- Faculdade de Tecnologia de São Paulo (FATEC-SP)
- Conservatório Dramático e Musical de São Paulo (CDMSP)
- Universidade Livre de Música – Centro de Estudos Musicais Tom Jobim

=== Hospitals ===
- Hospital Samaritano
- Hospital Santa Catarina
- Irmandade da Santa Casa de Misericórdia de São Paulo (ISCMSP)
- Hospital Nove de Julho
- Hospital Sírio-Libanês
- Hospital Alemão Oswaldo Cruz
- Beneficência Portuguesa de São Paulo

=== Culture and Leisure ===
- Mário de Andrade Library
- Theatro Municipal
- São Paulo Museum of Art (MASP)
- Museum of the Portuguese Language
- Sala São Paulo
- Pinacoteca do Estado
- Museu de Arte Saca
- Sociedade Brasileira de Cultura Japonesa

=== Rivers ===
- Tamanduateí River

=== Churches ===
- Church of Our Lady of the Rosary of Black Men
- Church and Convent of Saint Francis (São Paulo)
- Church of the Wounds of the Seraphic Father Saint Francis

=== Buildings ===
Major buildings in the central zone of São Paulo:

Buildings that have been the first major structures of the region

Rank	Name	Height ft (m)	Floors	Year
1	Mirante do Vale	558/170	51	1960
2	Edifício Itália	556/168	45	1965
3	Altino Arantes Building	528/161	40	1947
4	Banco do Brasil Building	474/143	24	1955
5	Edifício Copan	460/140	45	1953
6	Barão de Iguape Building	445/133	37	1959
7	Ipiranga 165	440/130	36	1968
8	Martinelli Building	440/130	30	1929
9	Grande São Paulo Building	438/129	40	1971
10	Mercantil Finasa	438/129	35	1973
11	Andraus Building	390/115	32	1962
12	Conde de Prates Building	385/112	33	1955
13	CBI Esplanada	380/110	30	1948

=== Sightseeing ===
Torre Banespa ("Banespa Tower"), situated on the highest point of the Altino Arantes Building and Edifício Itália are the main sightseeing places in the region and São Paulo as a whole, providing a privileged views of the city with a range of up to 40 kilometers, making it possible to see other city landmarks such as the Mercado Municipal, the São Paulo Cathedral, Edifício Copan and even Serra da Cantareira at distance. Mirante do Vale Building, completed in 1960, although not well known as a sightseeing place due to its location at the bottom of a valley, is still the tallest building in the Central Zone of São Paulo.

== Panorama ==
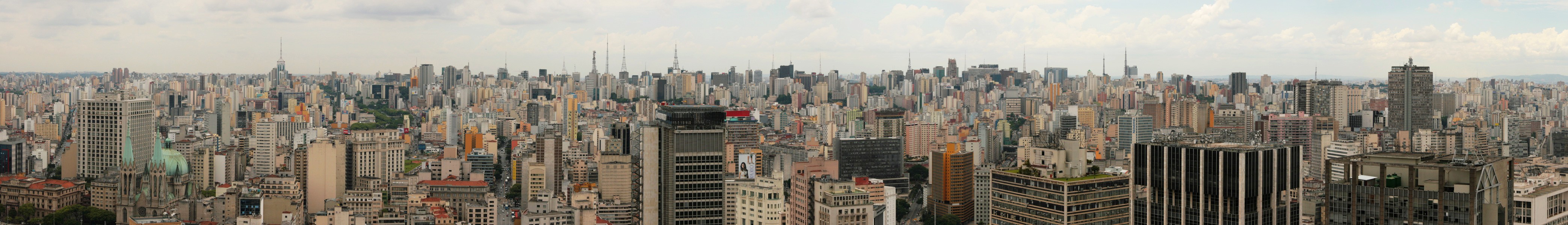
Panoramic view of buildings in the central zone of São Paulo.

== See also ==
- Central Business Districts
- List of central business districts
- São Paulo
- Tourism in the city of São Paulo
