= Subprefecture of Sé =

Coordinates: 23.5511°S 46.6342°W

- Subprefecture
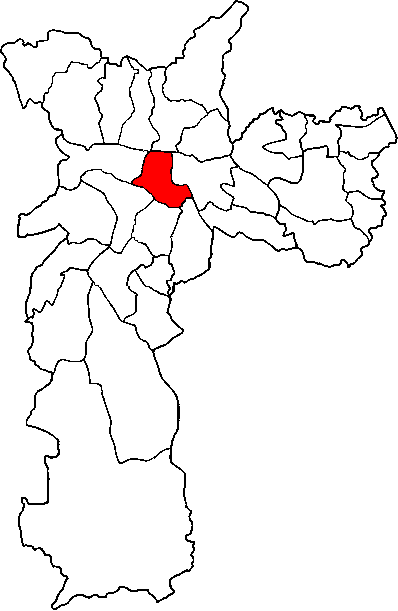
- Location of the Subprefecture of Sé in São Paulo

- Location of municipality of São Paulo within the State of São Paulo
- Country: Brazil
- Region: Southeast
- State: São Paulo
- Municipality: São Paulo
- Administrative Zone: Central
- Districts: Bela Vista, Bom Retiro, Cambuci, Consolação, Liberdade, República, Sé, Santa Cecília

Government
  - Type: Subprefecture
  - Subprefect: Nevoral Alves Bucheroni

Area
  - Total: 26.56 km^{2} (10.25 sq mi)

Population (2008)
  - Total: 328,597
- Website: Subprefeitura Sé (Portuguese)

The Subprefecture of Sé is one of 32 subprefectures of the city of São Paulo, Brazil. It comprises eight districts: Bela Vista, Bom Retiro, Cambuci, Consolação, Liberdade, República, Sé, Santa Cecília. This subprefecture forms the inner city, historical core of the city. The São Paulo Stock Exchange is also located in this area.

== See also ==
- Roman Catholic Archdiocese of São Paulo
- Vai-Vai
