= Sala São Paulo =

Concert hall in São Paulo, Brazil

- Centro Cultural Júlio Prestes
- Interior of Sala São Paulo

- Location within São Paulo Location within Brazil

General information
- Type: Concert hall
- Architectural style: Necoclassical; Louis XVI style
- Location: Praça Júlio Prestes, 16; Campos Elíseos, São Paulo.
- Coordinates: 23°32′3″S 46°38′23″W
- Current tenants: São Paulo State Symphony Orchestra
- Completed: 1938 (main building)
- Inaugurated: 9 July 1999 (concert hall)
- Owner: State Government of São Paulo

Height
- Height: 24 m (79 ft)

Technical details
- Floor area: 10,000 m^{2} (110,000 sq ft)

Design and construction
- Architect: Cristiano Stockler das Neves

Other information
- Seating capacity: 1498
- Public transit: Luz; Luz; Júlio Prestes

The Júlio Prestes Cultural Center, which is located in the Júlio Prestes Train Station in the old north central section of the city of São Paulo, Brazil, was inaugurated on July 9, 1999. The building has been restored and renovated by the São Paulo State Government, as part of the downtown revitalization in that city. It houses the Sala São Paulo, which has a capacity of 1498 seats and is the home of the São Paulo State Symphonic Orchestra (OSESP). It is a venue for symphonic and chamber presentations.

Renovation began in November 1997, but the first steps were taken in 1995. Governor Mário Covas visualized the Julio Prestes Space as ideal for symphonic presentations and because OSESP did not have a permanent home at that time.

== History of the building ==
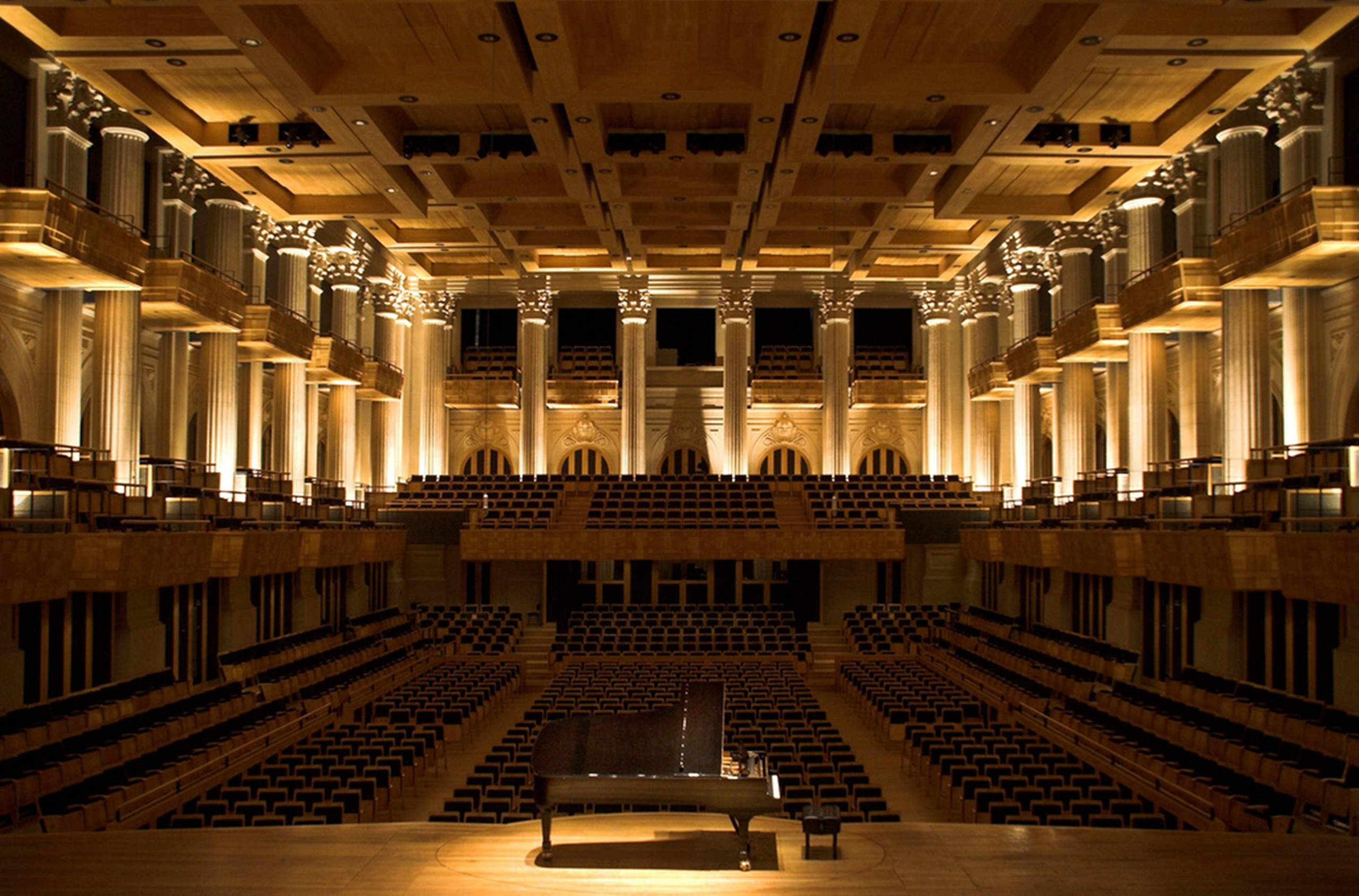
Sala São Paulo, seen from the choir.

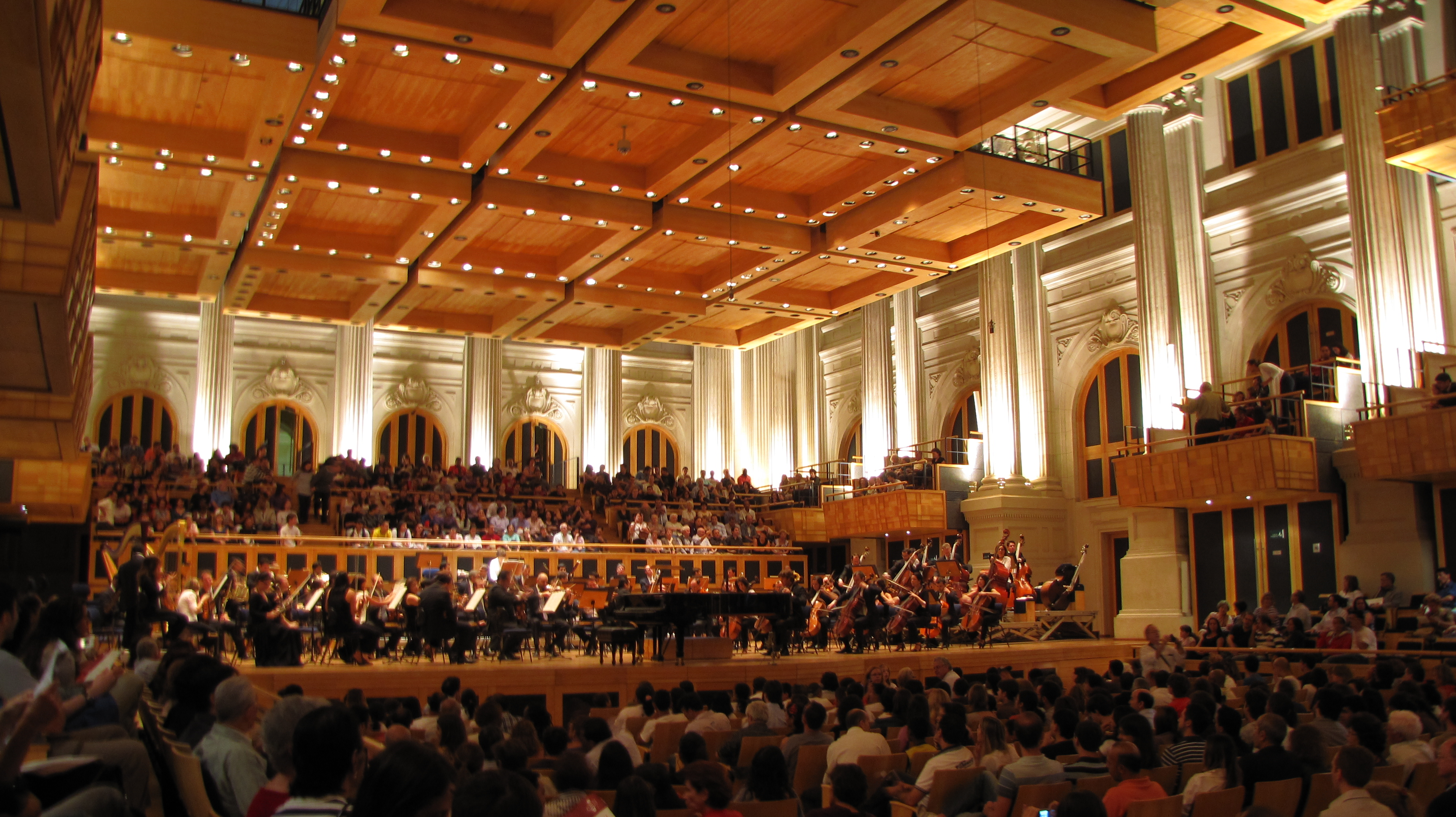
Visitors during a concert at the great hall.

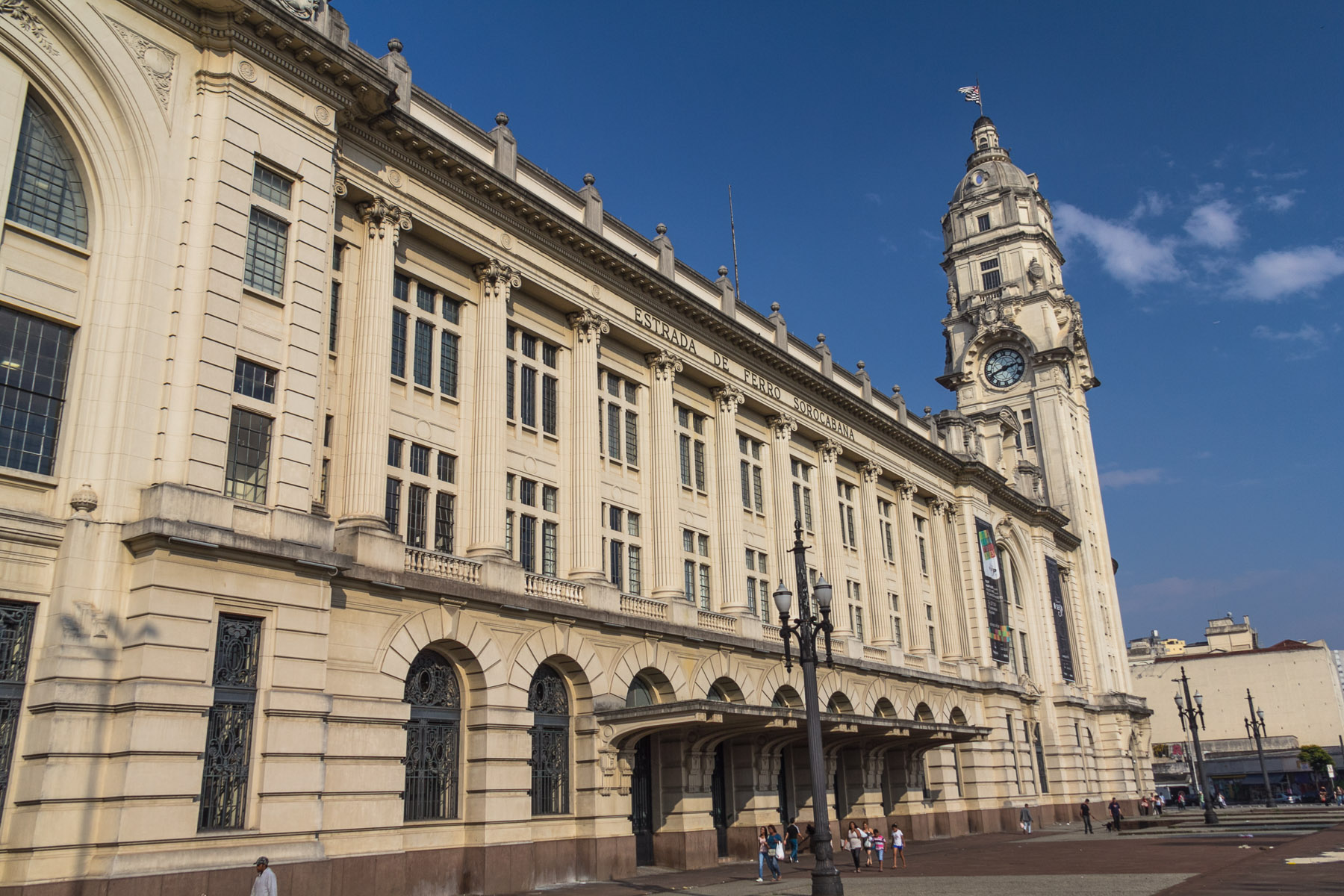
Julio Prestes Train Station.

Julio Prestes Station was built between 1926 and 1938 to be the headquarters and departure point of the Sorocabana Railway (EFS) - a company set up by coffee barons to ship the product from the SW of São Paulo State and Parana' State to the port of Santos. The state of São Paulo acquired the EFS in 1905 and its name was changed to Ferrovia Paulista S/A or FEPASA in the 1970s. After the 1929 New York Exchange crash and recession that followed, the São Paulo coffee stock market declined in importance. With industrialization and the advent of the car industry and the excellent São Paulo State road network, mass transportation switched to state of the art buses and automobiles. The FEPASA line, which had become infamous for lateness & technical problems, was finally replaced by the automobile and most stations closed their doors to passenger transportation between SW towns and the state capital.

From the 1980s on the Companhia de Trens Metropolitanos - CPTM - took over the line, operating only in the metropolitan area and municipalities in the Greater São Paulo region. The name Julio Prestes honors an ex-railwayman who was governor of São Paulo and a presidential candidate to Brazil. The architect who planned JP, Christiano Stockler das Neves, based his project on an eclectic style, described as neo classical Louis XVI which was a reaction to the overornate baroque style. He was also clearly influenced by the old Pennsylvania station in New York, which was demolished to give way to the building of the Madison Square Garden. While it was being built in the 1920s, the Grand Hall, where the concert hall is today, had a small railway in the middle of the construction work. Thus, imported material from Europe could be easily brought in.

In the beginning of the 21st century, engineers working on the transformation of the Grand Hall have also had their difficulties to reconcile today's technology with historical conservation. An old train was replaced with a gigantic 150 ton crane. This was the only way that the massive girders could be lifted around 25 metres, and be transformed into part of the structure that supports the adjustable ceiling over the new hall.

== Choice of the Grand Hall as Concert Hall ==
The station's large hall was chosen because its dimensions are similar to 19th century concert halls, that is, it is shaped in the 'shoebox style', as is the case of the halls in Boston, Vienna and Amsterdam.

Sala São Paulo has 22 balconies at mezzanine and first floor levels. They have been placed between large columns and an adjustable ceiling, created by the American company Artec. Its floor space is ten thousand square meters and the ceiling is 24 meters high.

The venue usually hosts classical music concerts, but on 15 January 2009 Elton John played at the main hall, in a private concert for Cruzeiro do Sul Investments Bank. The concert was attended by 1100.

== Concert Platform and Main floor Space ==
The 320 m platform was strategically built to offer total visibility. It has portable risers which allow choir and orchestra to alternate in mid concert, as well as a stage elevator for a piano.

The acoustic project was carefully designed to neutralize vibrations caused by the constant movement of trains. For this reason the main hall's 15 centimeter-thick floating floor was built on an immense neoprene slab which functions like a massive wedge between two concrete layers lined with Brazilian walnut, ideal material for absorbing noise. The floor was also lowered 1.22 m to respect acoustic requirements and avoid esthetic disfigurement.

In order to complete the hall's "shoe box" shape, the specialists opted for a 150 mm slab, supported by metallic girders protected by the main structure (trusses) surrounded by 3 panels of gypsum board, each one measuring 12.5 mm thick. In addition to this, ante-chambers were built in all the circulation areas and accesses to the concert hall to exclude undesirable noises. The passage to the platforms is also protected with thick glass, and also effectively blocks invasion of noise from the trains.

The main floor has a capacity for 830 seats and 679 seats in the boxes and balconies on the mezzanine and first floor. The metal seats have ivory wood details. The material used, including the placing and the number of seats were all planned to avoid any possible interference with the flow of sound.

== Adjustable ceiling ==
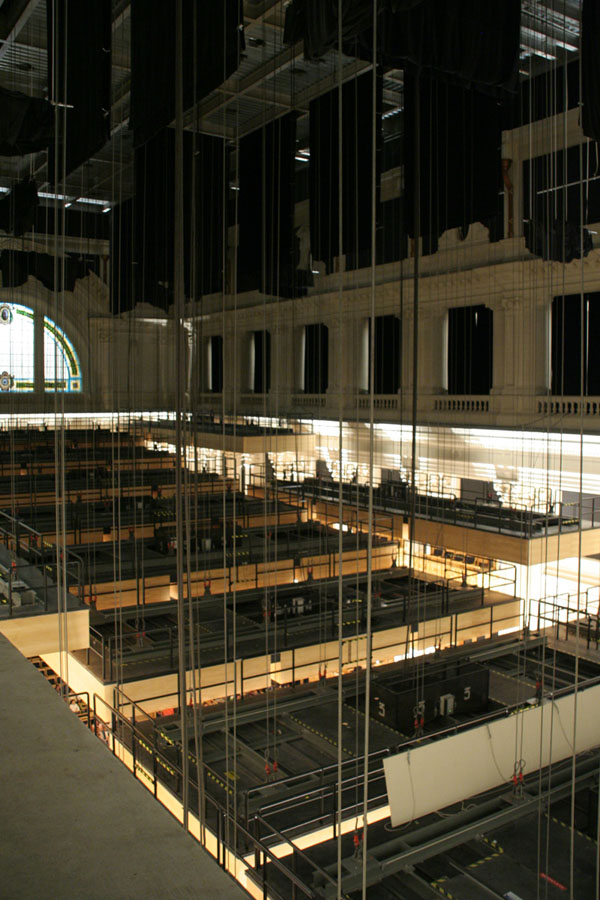
Adjustable ceiling.

The adjustable ceiling is suspended 25 meters above the main floor. It has 15 panels, each weighing 7.5 tons and are held by 20 cable coils. The panels can be individually controlled, allowing the volume of the hall to be adjusted to between 12 thousand and 28 thousand cubic meters.This ensures that the intensity of any composition has its acoustic concept respected.

The panels can be adjusted independently or together, through the use of computers, locks and automatic sensors. Along with the ceiling's flexibility, 26 velvet banners can hang 8 meters down, according to the vibration required. There is an additional advantage which is that this system shows all the original architecture with elements of the new architectural concept added.

Over the ceiling there is a polycarbonate cover with rounded ends, which respects the concept of the building's original project but uses more modern materials. Thermo-acoustic tiles have been instead of copper, and polycarbonate instead of glass. The trellised cover conditions 230 tons of metal structure and sustains the technical floor. It is composed of a reinforced steel deck, supported on a structural steel grid. The floor is attached to the columns to support the electromagnetic equipment for hanging the lining panels, air conditioning equipment and ducts.

== Foundations ==
A superstructure was added in order to support the weight of the additions to the building. The columns which surround the old indoor garden, and support the structure, had added to them 1000 tons of steel and 4.5 tons of sandstone. This is equal to the added weight of the concert hall ceiling, acoustic isolation, technical floor and air conditioning system. The estimate is that 15 thousand cubic meters of concrete were used, enough to build 12 12-storey buildings.

== Restoration ==
The restoration process sought to retain the historic characteristics of the building. Before they could start work on the façade of the building the technical and restoration teams had to spend three months researching. Using old photographs, the original mirrors and door handles were designed and then copied by craftsmen. The doors also required special care, and 81 were restored. The sandstone that was used came from the same quarry as in 1926.

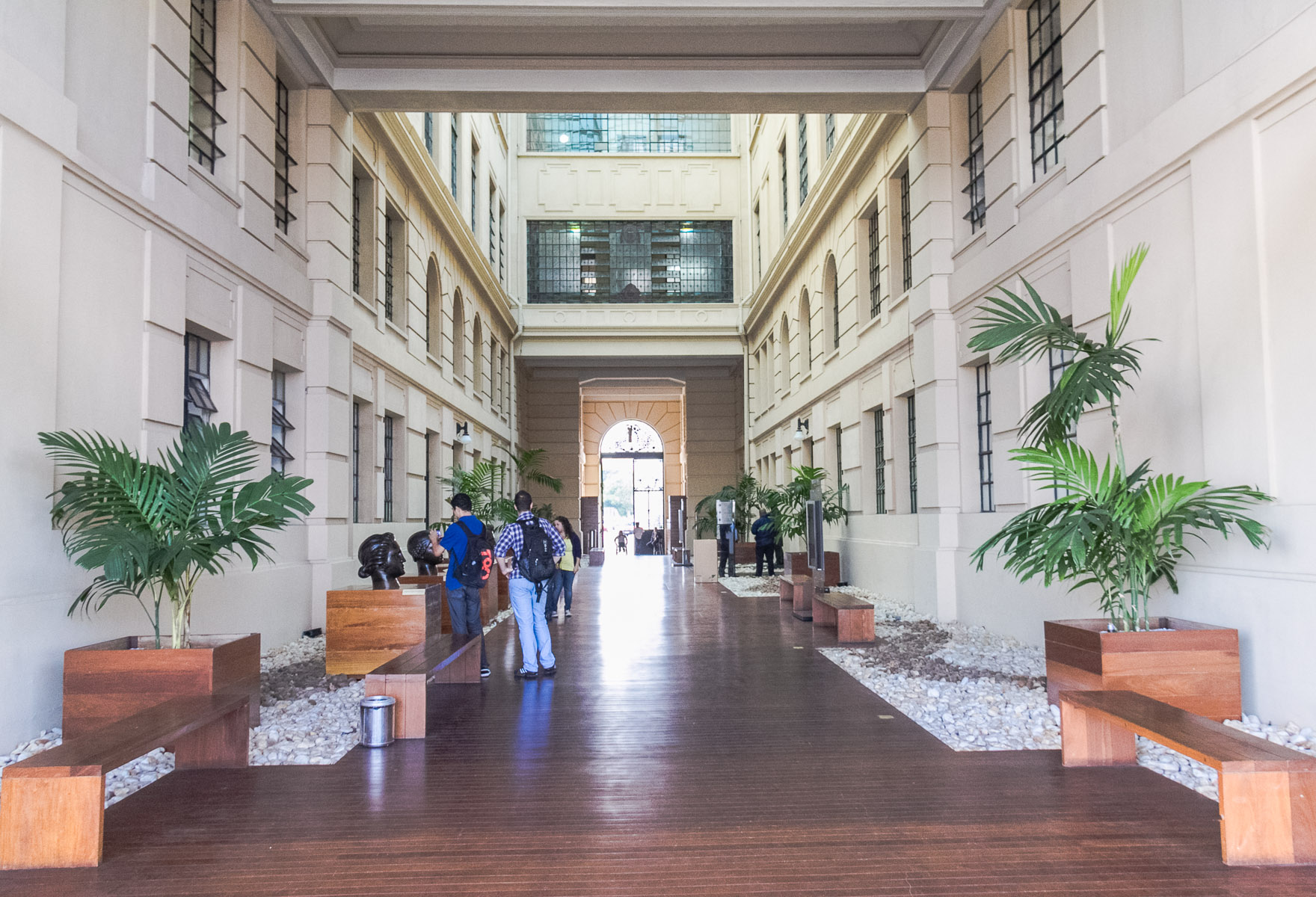

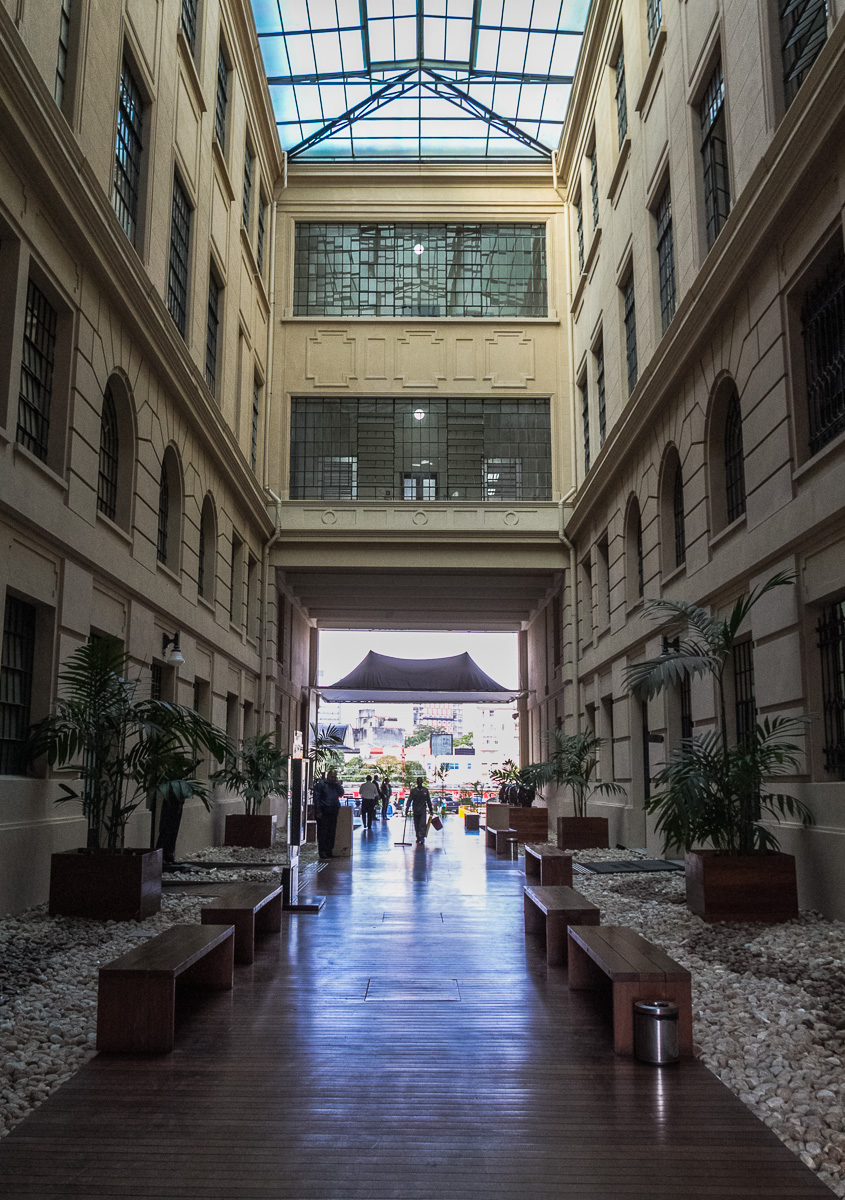

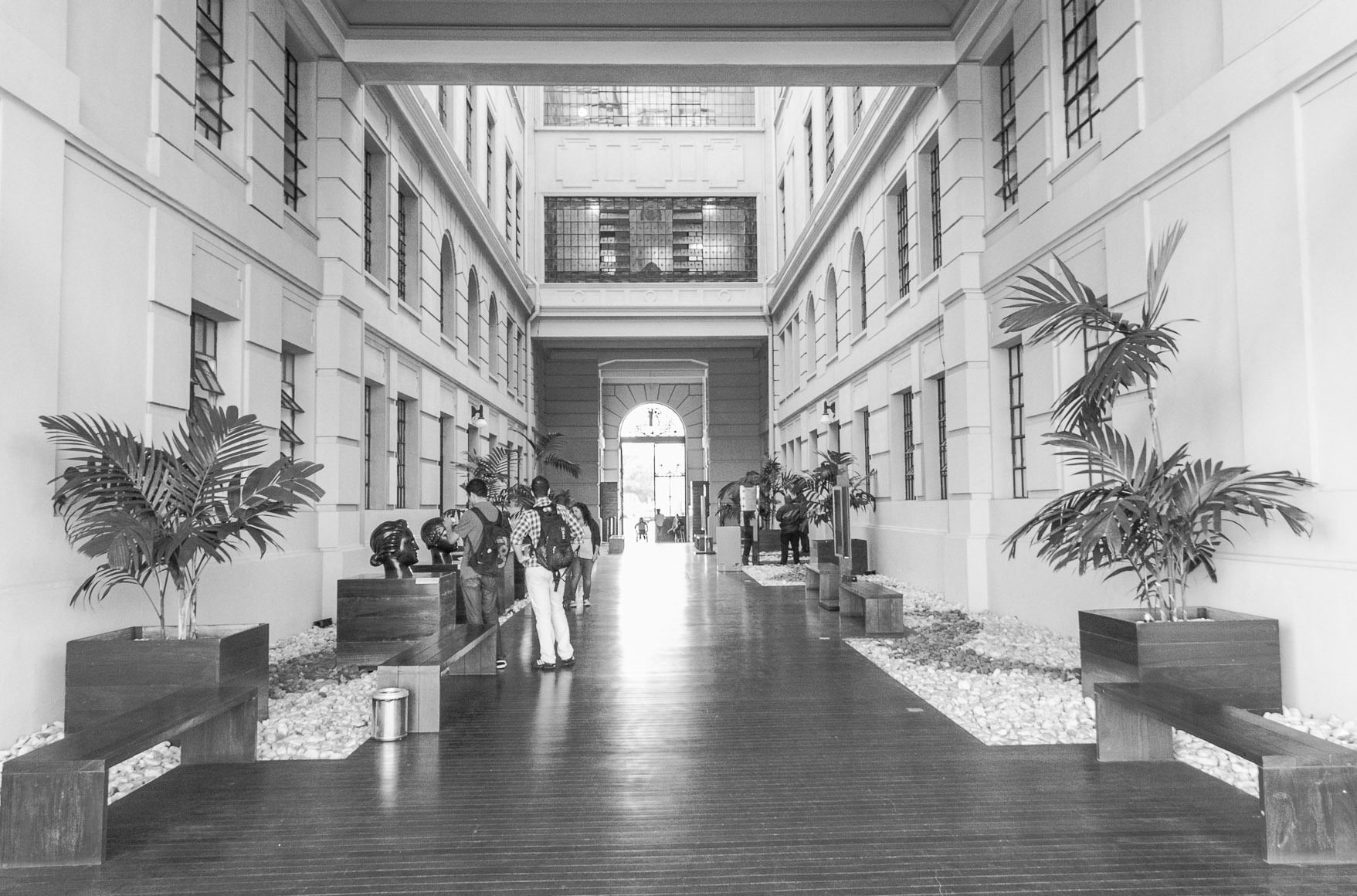

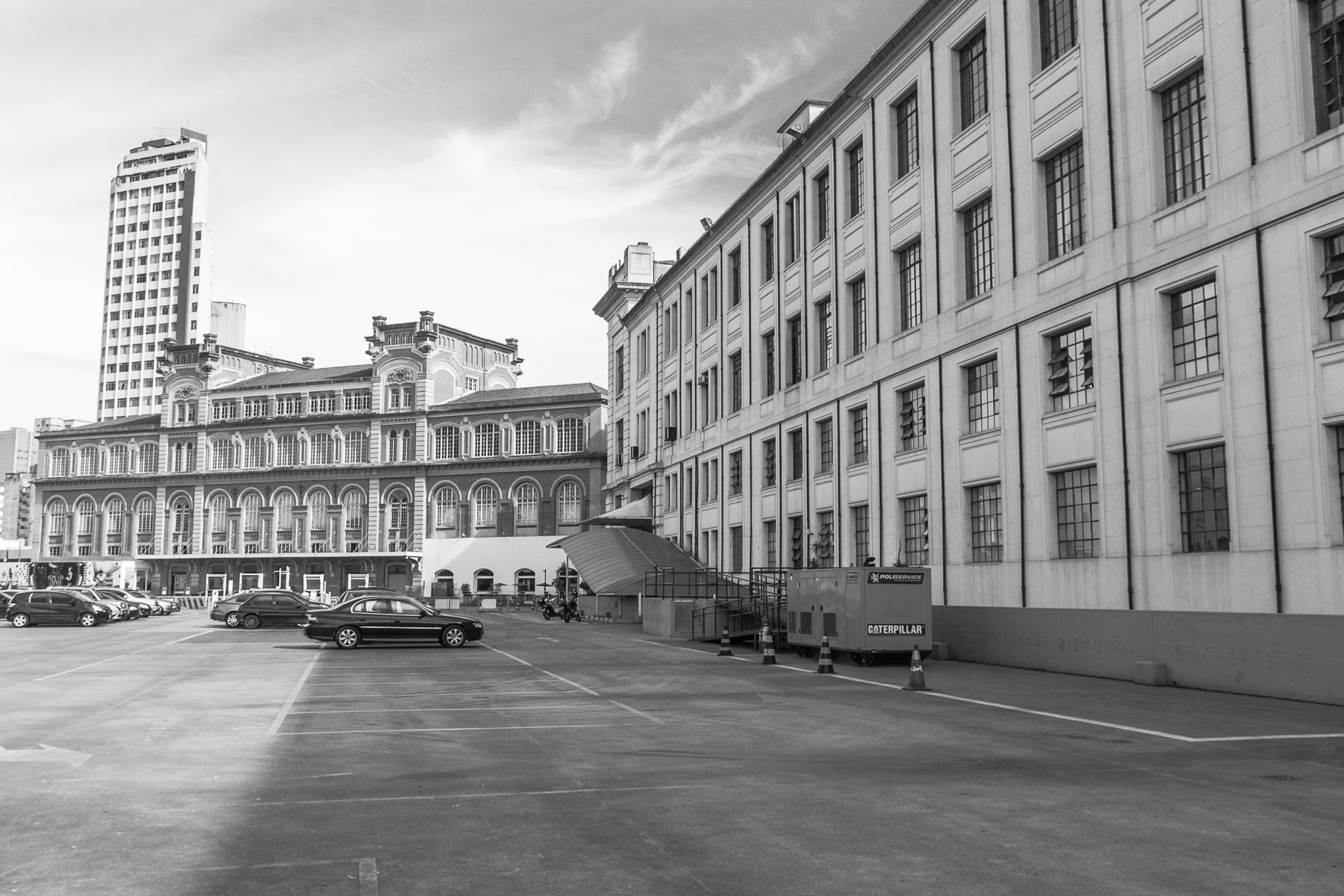

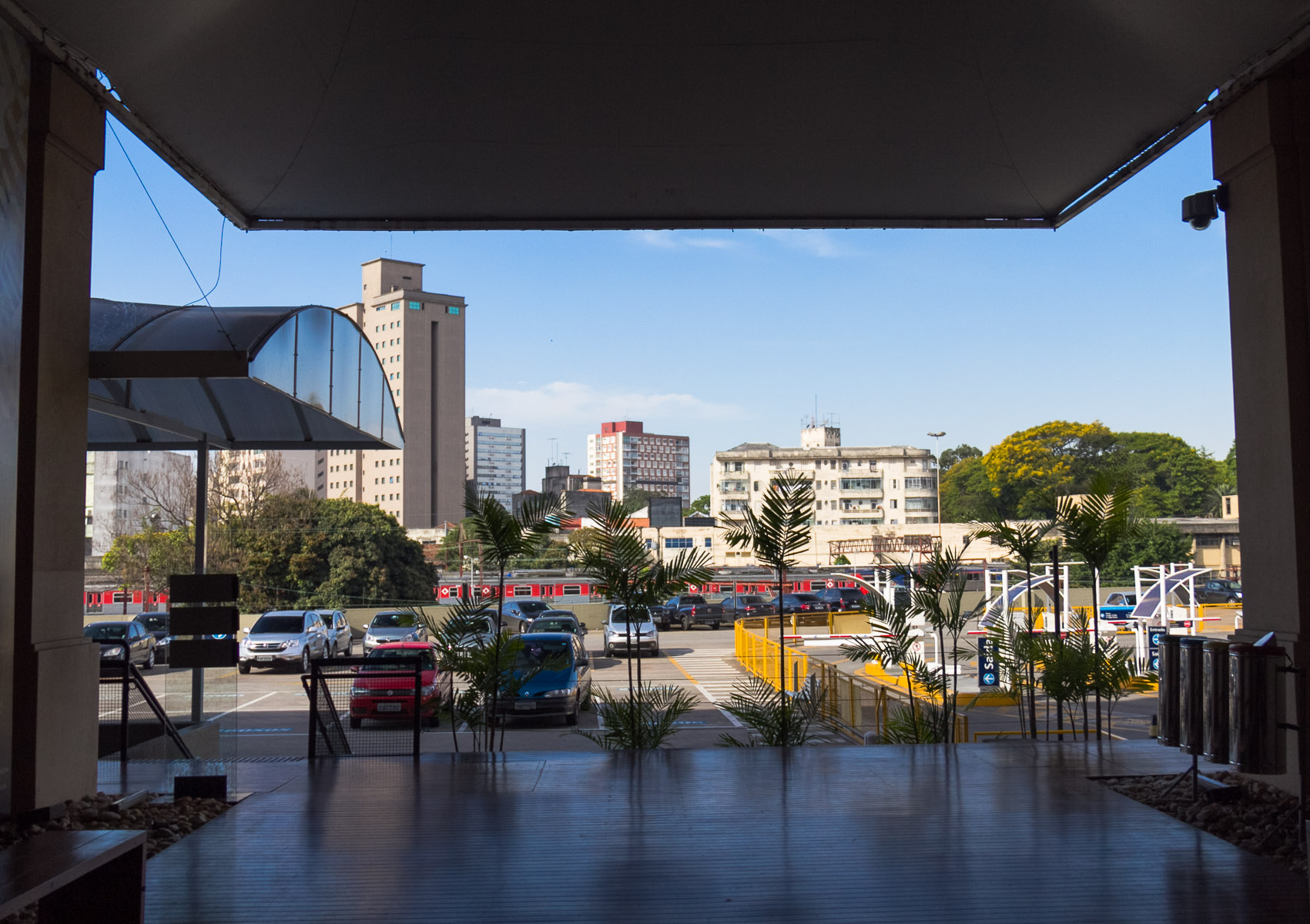

== See also ==
- List of concert halls
