= Sé (district of São Paulo) =

District of São Paulo, Brazil

Coordinates: 23°33′04″S 46°38′03″W

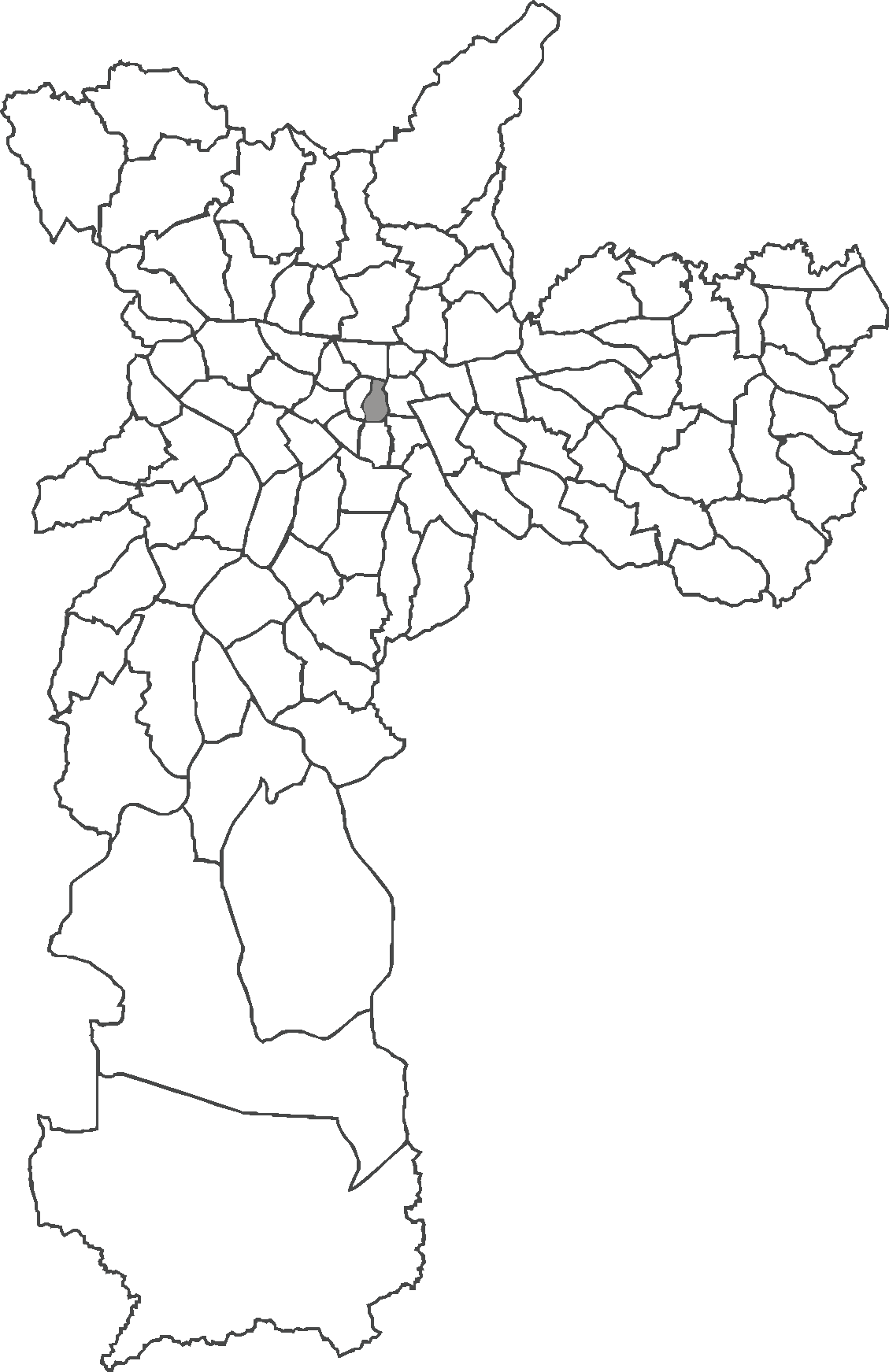
- Location in the city of São Paulo

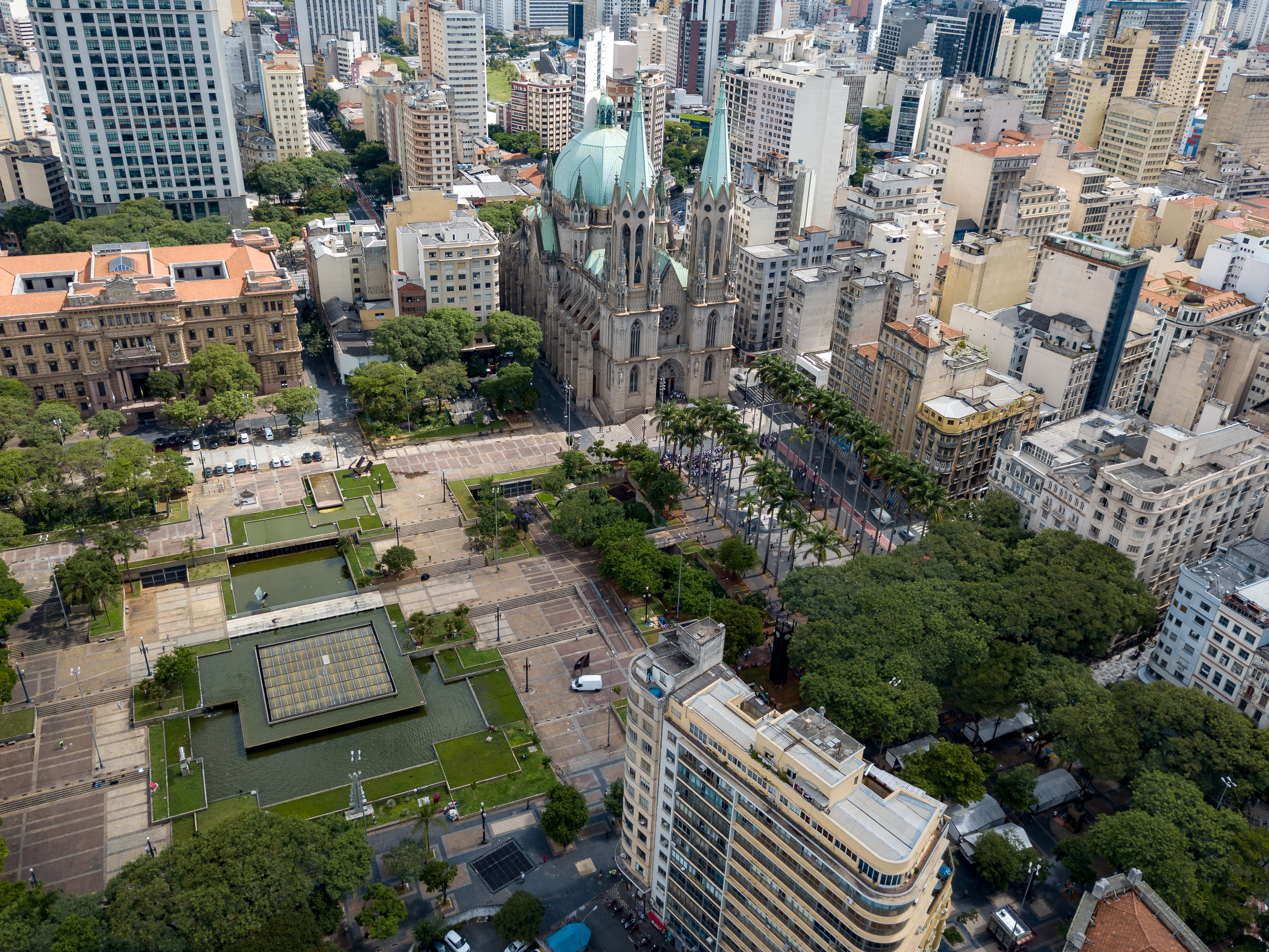
- Metropolitan Cathedral
- Country: Brazil
- State: São Paulo
- City: São Paulo

Government
  - Type: Subprefecture
  - Subprefect: Amauri Luiz Pastorello

Area
  - Total: 2.1 km^{2} (0.81 sq mi)

Population (2000)
  - Total: 20,115
  - Density: 9,578/km^{2} (24,810/sq mi)
- HDI: 0.858 –high
- Website: Subprefecture of Sé

Sé is the name of the most central borough in the city of São Paulo, in Brazil, divided in eight districts. The name comes from the presence of São Paulo Cathedral (Catedral da Sé) in the borough, and it is also the name of the central square (Praça da Sé). Also located in the Sé are the Pátio do Colégio, site of the foundation of the city in 1554, the São Paulo stock exchange (the Bovespa), the mayor's palace and other historical buildings, including the Municipal Theater of São Paulo, the São Paulo Music Hall (Sala São Paulo) and the central railway Luz Station (Estação da Luz).

Immigrant groups established in the Sé borough include Italians (in Bela Vista), Japanese (in Liberdade), and Jews (in Bom Retiro). Sé is also the borough with the largest number of subway stations. There are many areas of popular commerce, like the 25 de Março Street (one of the most popular area of commerce in Brazil, though often illegal), and high-class areas such as Pacaembu and Higienópolis. The famous Paulista Avenue (Avenida Paulista) is the southwest limit of this borough, with the borough of Pinheiros.

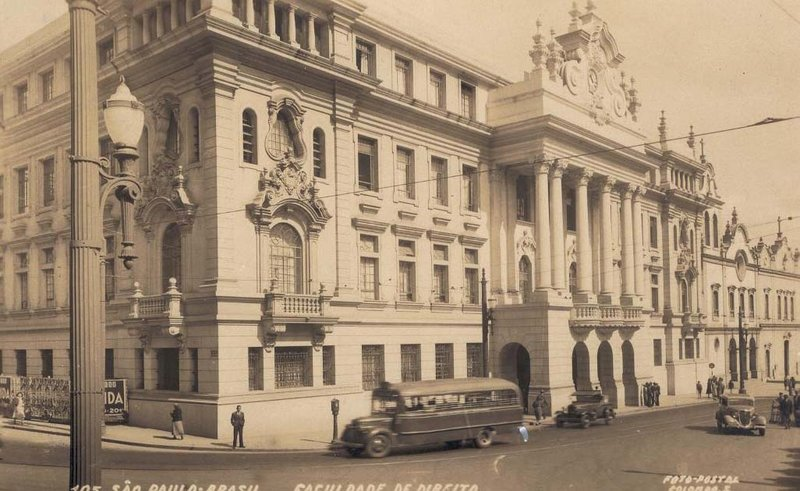
Historical Law School building (1950), located in downtown São Paulo.

The neighbourhood (and the later city) has developed between the three ancient churches of Our Lady of Mount Carmel, Saint Benedict and Saint Francis of Assisi (which part of it was expropriated by Emperor Pedro II for the establishment of the Law School).

This borough is also an important college center with the very traditional Law School of the University of São Paulo and Mackenzie University, founded by North American Presbyterian missionaries in the 19th century.

== See also ==
- Parque Dom Pedro II
