= Cambuci (district of São Paulo) =

District of São Paulo, Brazil

Coordinates: 23.5628°S 46.6128°W

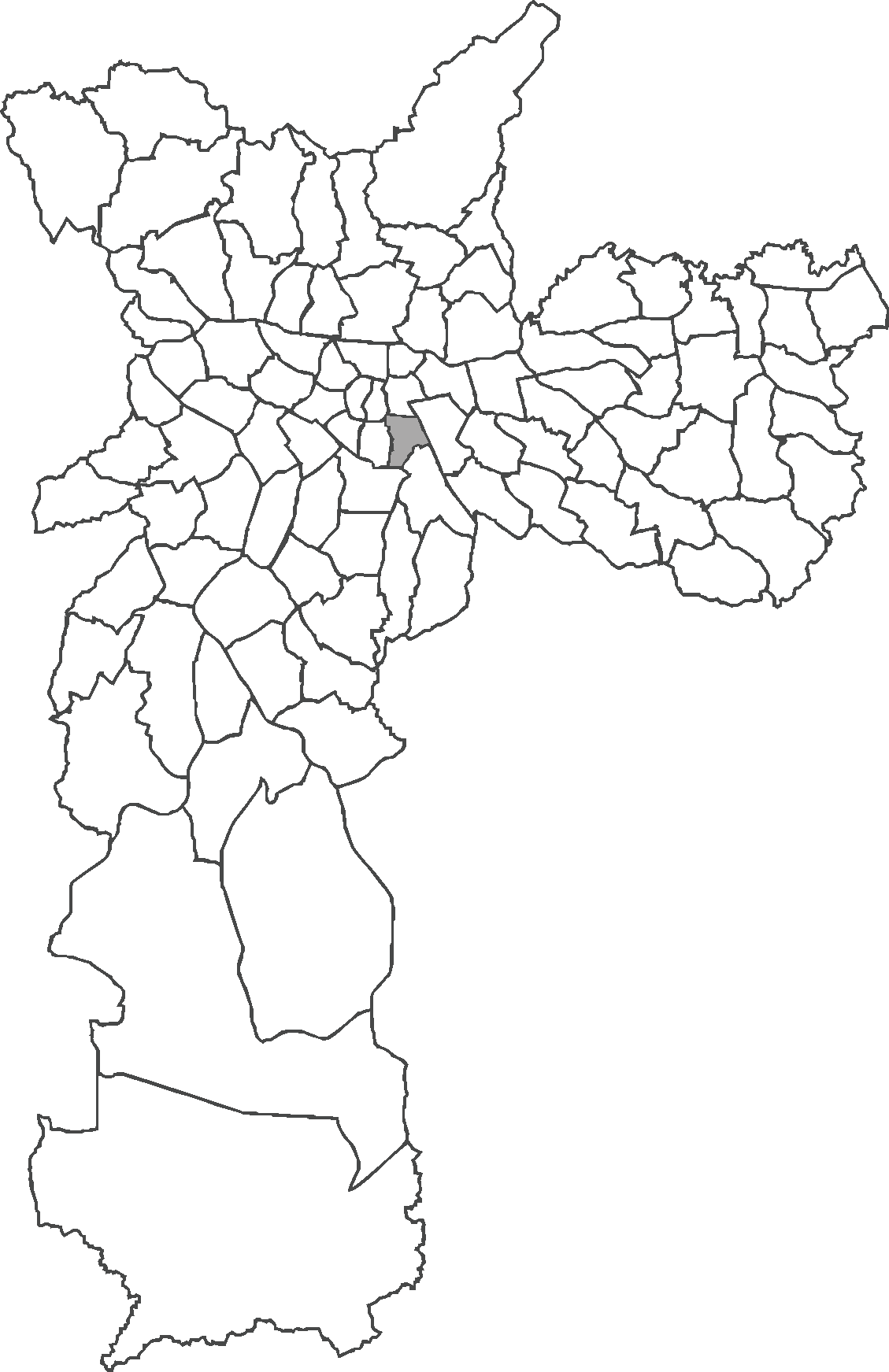
- Location in the city of São Paulo

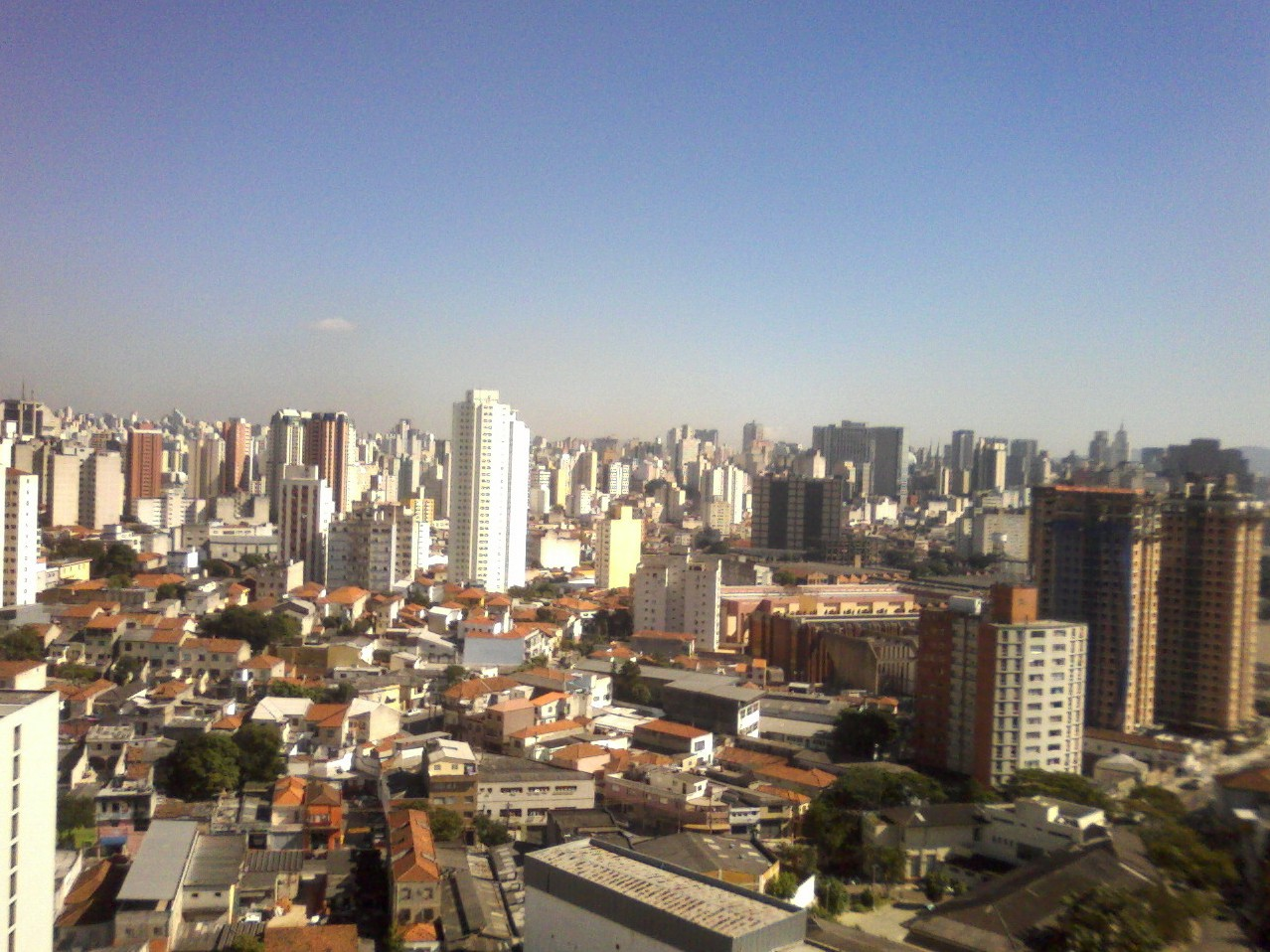
- Skyline of Cambuci
- Country: Brazil
- State: São Paulo
- City: São Paulo

Government
  - Type: Subprefecture
  - Subprefect: Amauri Luiz Pastorello

Area
  - Total: 3.9 km^{2} (1.5 sq mi)

Population (2000)
  - Total: 28.717
  - Density: 7.363/km^{2} (19.07/sq mi)
- HDI: 0.903 –high
- Website: Subprefecture of Sé

Cambuci is a district in the city of São Paulo, Brazil.
