= Bela Vista =

District of São Paulo, Brazil

Coordinates: 23°33′37″S 46°38′55″W

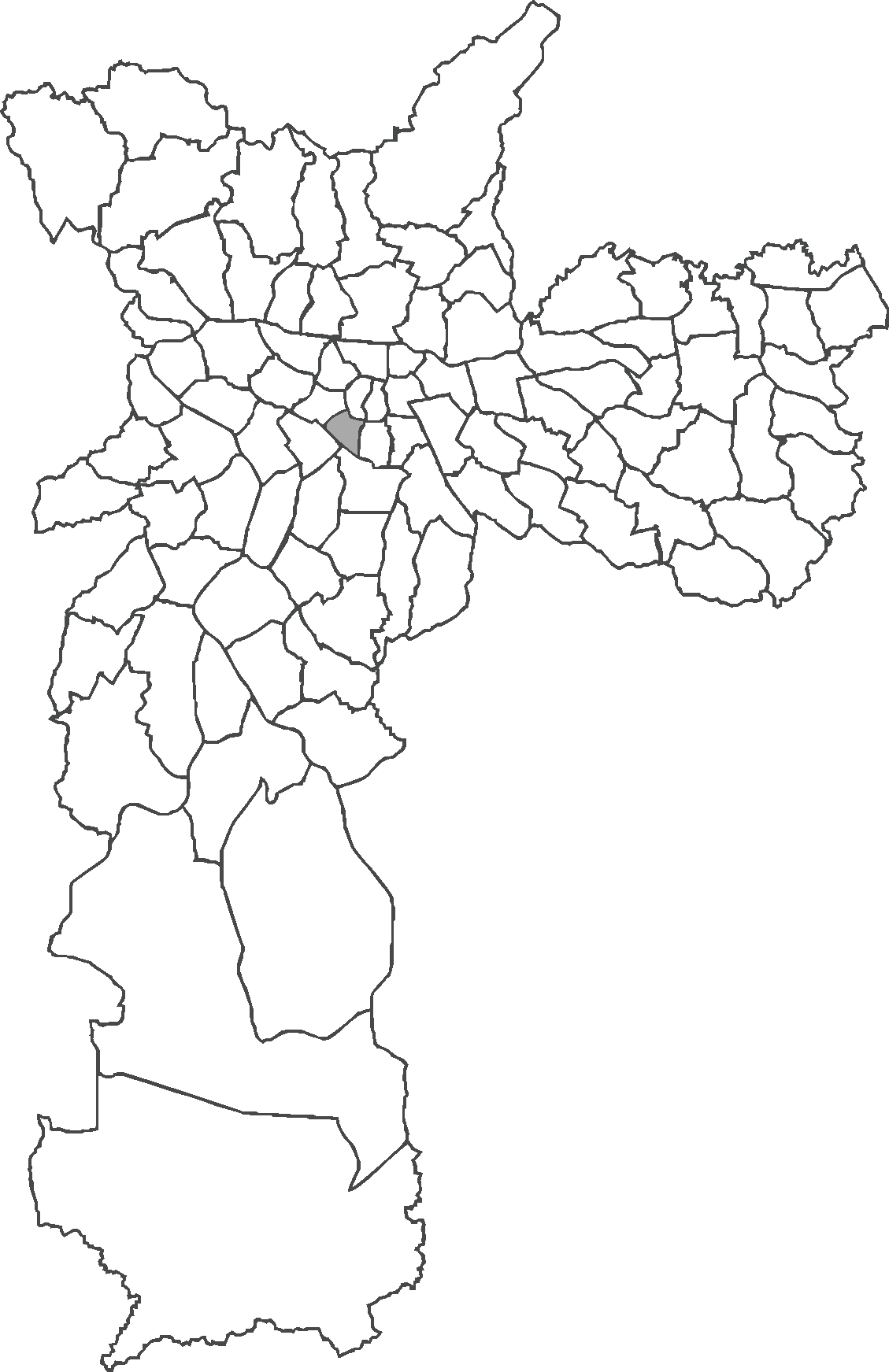
- Location in the city of São Paulo

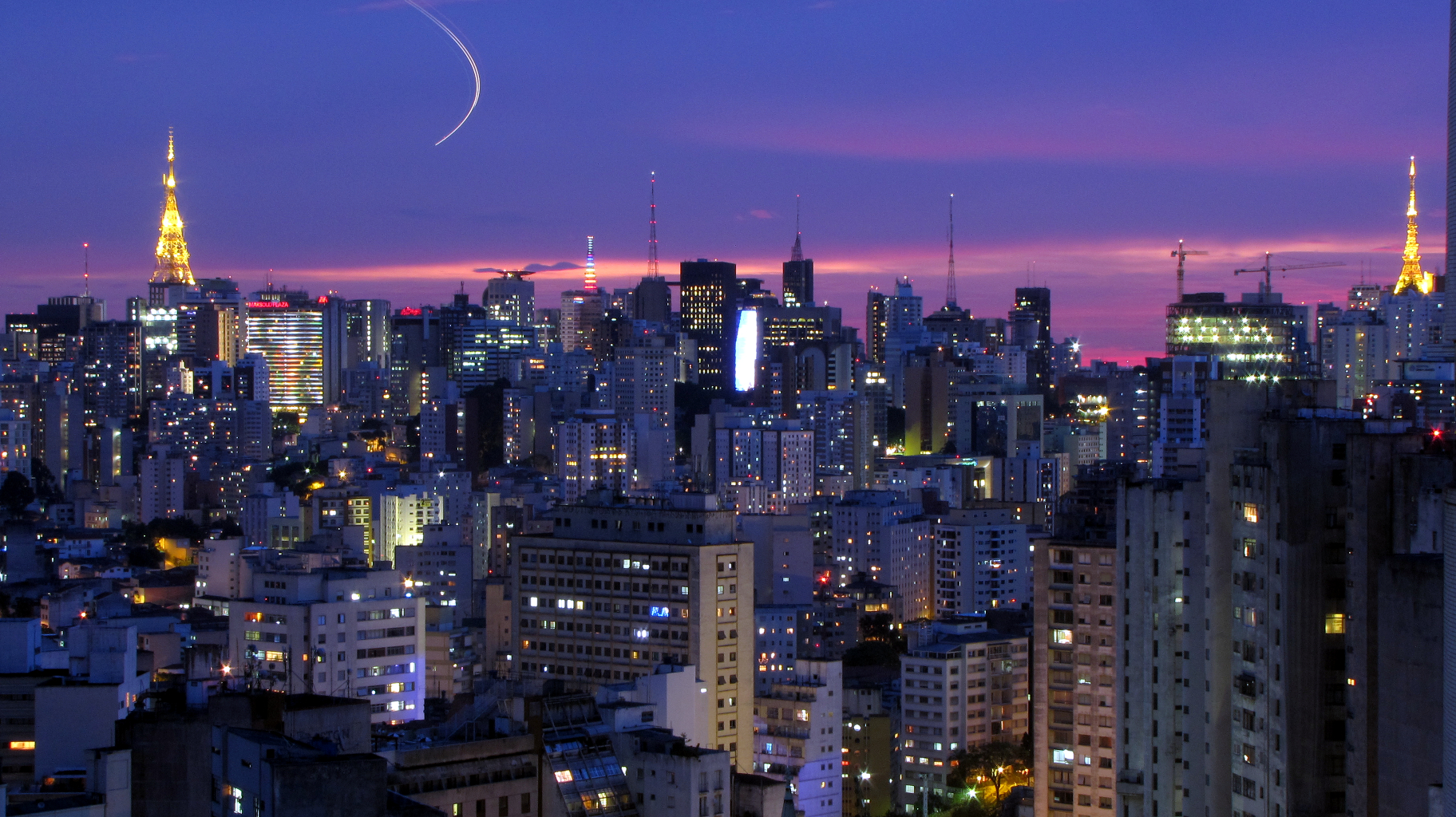
- View of Bela Vista at night
- Country: Brazil
- State: São Paulo
- City: São Paulo

Government
  - Type: Subprefecture
  - Subprefect: Amauri Luiz Pastorello

Area
  - Total: 2.6 km^{2} (1.0 sq mi)

Population (2000)
  - Total: 63,190
  - Density: 24,304/km^{2} (62,950/sq mi)
- HDI: 0.940 –high
- Website: Subprefecture of Sé

Bela Vista (also known as Bexiga or Bixiga) is one of the most traditional Italian neighborhoods in the city of São Paulo, Brazil. It belongs to the borough of Sé, and it has been a mixed neighborhood since its beginning, where free African-Brazilians and/or a mixture of Native-Brazilians, Blacks and Portuguese descendants lived. Later, more European immigrants arrived, such as Spaniards, Germans, English, French, Belgians, and Italians. The Italian community became more numerous than all the others during the first decades of the twentieth century. (source: São Paulo sections site: Bairros de São Paulo)

== Entertainment ==
Bela Vista hosts a large number of Italian cantinas or eateries, restaurant and/or delicatessens. Renowned theaters, such as the state-funded Teatro Sergio Cardoso and few smaller ones on Rua dos Ingleses/Morro dos Ingleses and Avenida 9 de Julho area, such as the teatros Bibi Ferreira and Maria Della Costa. Most theatres nowadays tend to concentrate on Avenida Brigadeiro Luis Antonio with Teatro Abril being the most important venue of musical presentations such as Miss Saigon, Beauty and the Beast, and The Phantom of the Opera. Towards the end of the twentieth century, parts of Bexiga became more decayed and dilapidated because its more affluent middle-class moved to newer areas in the suburbs. Although most of the clubs and bars moved from Bela Vista to Itaim Bibi and Vila Madalena in the late 1980s and mid 1990s, Bexiga still has a somewhat vibrant nightlife and is the home of many descendants of Italians and young professionals and students that enjoy the urban atmosphere and the Avenida Paulista area nearby. Bela Vista is also the home of the Vai-Vai Samba School, the oldest one in São Paulo.

== Church ==
Our Lady Achiropita Roman Catholic church on Rua 13 de Maio is an important charity and cultural center in the neighborhood. Famous for the Achiropita procession and the street Italian food fair all weekends in August, the community caters to the needs of poor children and their families in the section and promotes integration of diversity into worship, by adding an African-Brazilian flavor to its masses and baptismal ceremonies.

== Hospitals ==
The Menino Jesus (Infant Jesus) children's hospital, the Perola Byington women's hospital, The German Osvaldo Cruz hospital, the Hospital Paulistano, Hospital Santa Catarina and Hospital Sirio-Libanes—a cardiovascular and cancer reference institutions,-- as well as vaccine institutes such as the Instituto Pasteur on Avenida Paulista, and other important laboratories and clinics are located in the Bela Vista region.

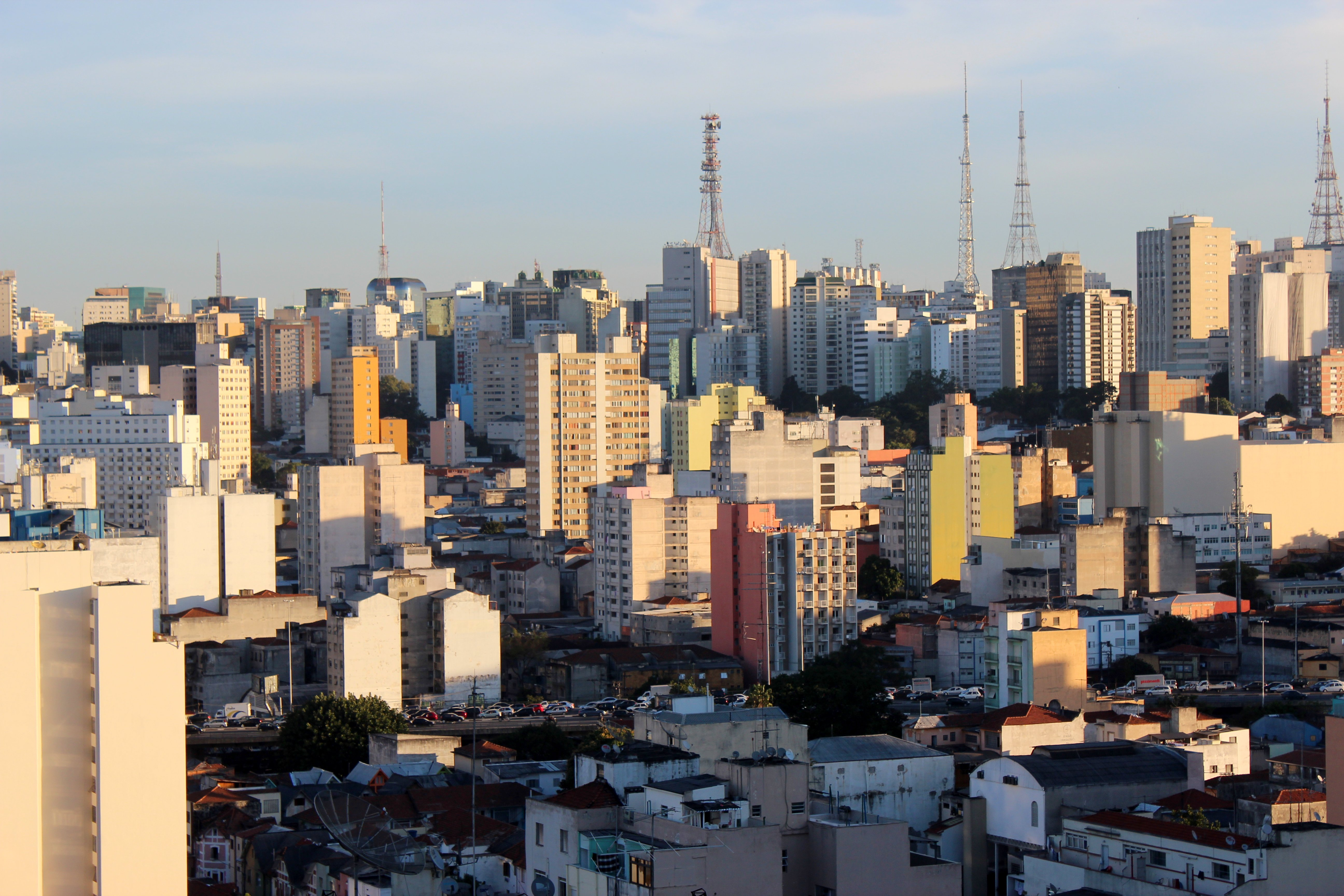
View of Bela Vista

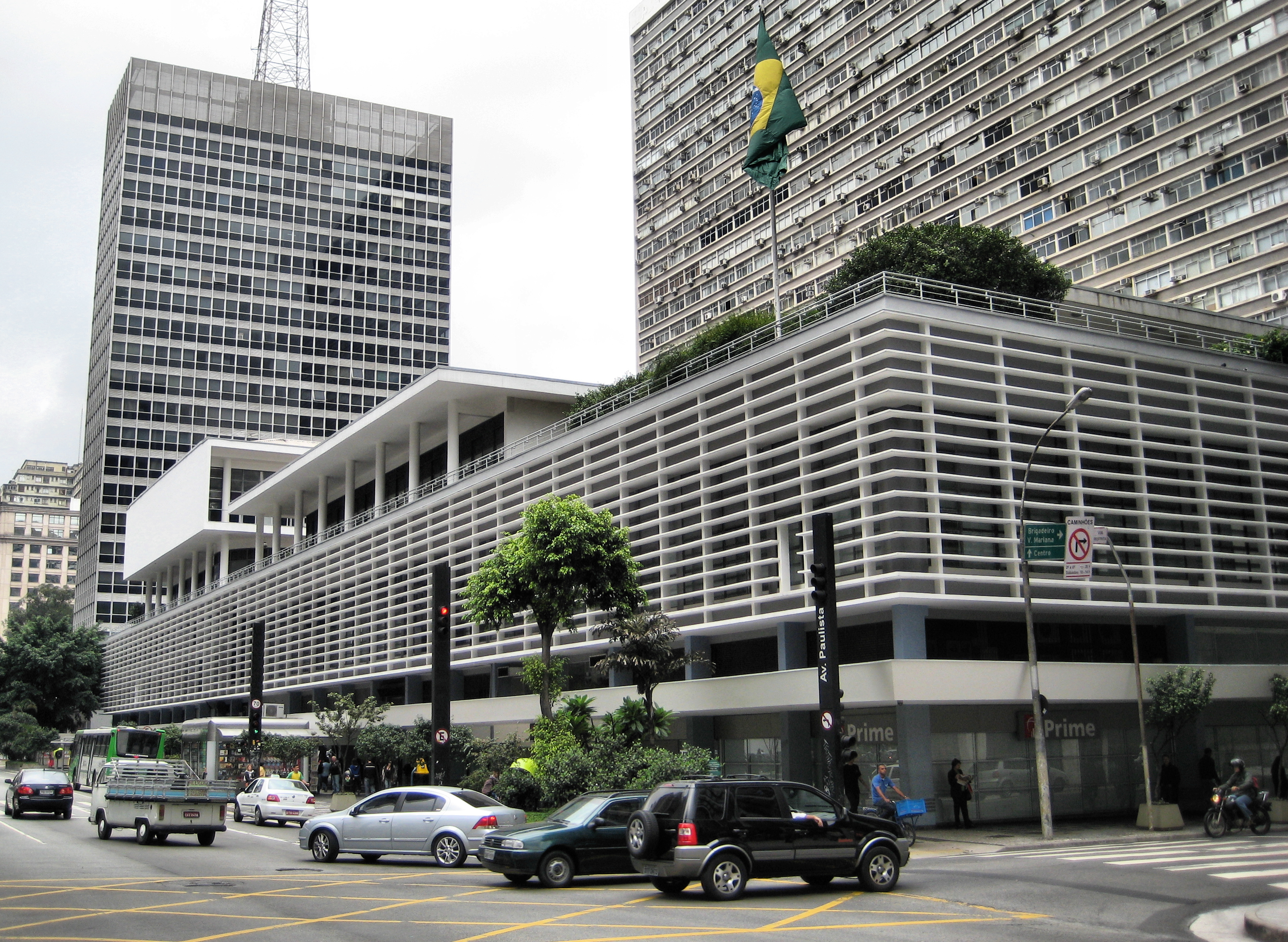
Paulista Avenue

Chá Viaduct

== Education ==
Higher education institutions such as Fundacao Getulio Vargas's Schools of Business (EAESP), Economics (EESP) and Law (EDESP), Colegio Objectivo, the Centro Universitario Ibero-Americano, and elite private schools also make their home in Bela Vista, which claims parts of the Avenida Paulista's São Paulo financial center as within its jurisdiction.

== Shopping ==
The Paulista shopping mall, The Cidade de São Paulo shopping mall, the Hipermercado Extra, and the Pao de Acucar supermarket chain also make their home in the Bela Vista/Av. Paulista/Paraiso/Jardim Paulista region.

== Nickname ==
Bela Vista is also known as "Bexiga" ou "Bixiga." The saying goes that an infection of the bladder ("bexiga" in Portuguese) was common in the section in the late nineteenth century and beginning of the twentieth century when it still had a few farms, and residents were labeled with that pejorative. Others say that an Italian or Portuguese resident known for drinking at the taverns of Bela Vista until late night, had a belly as round and big as a party balloon (also "bexiga" in Portuguese), so, the section was nicknamed after him.

== Festival ==
Until recently, the Bela Vista community organized the celebration of the anniversary of the City of São Paulo by offering a huge long cake to the population, measuring the age of São Paulo for each year in the metric system. Lack of funding and greed on the part of revellers who grabbed chunks of the cake and stuffed Tupperware containers to take home, which made the cake disappear in seconds, seem to have stopped the annual event on January 25, the Catholic feast of the Conversion of Paul, the apostle, and anniversary of the foundation of São Paulo de Pirapitininga by chief Tibirica' & the Spanish Jesuits Anchieta and Nobrega. (sources: Cyrillo, a São Paulo native who lived in Bela Vista; O Globo Online and Folha de S.Paulo news 2009)

== See also ==
- Roman Catholic Archdiocese of São Paulo
- Vai-Vai
