= Cracolândia =

Place in São Paulo, Brazil

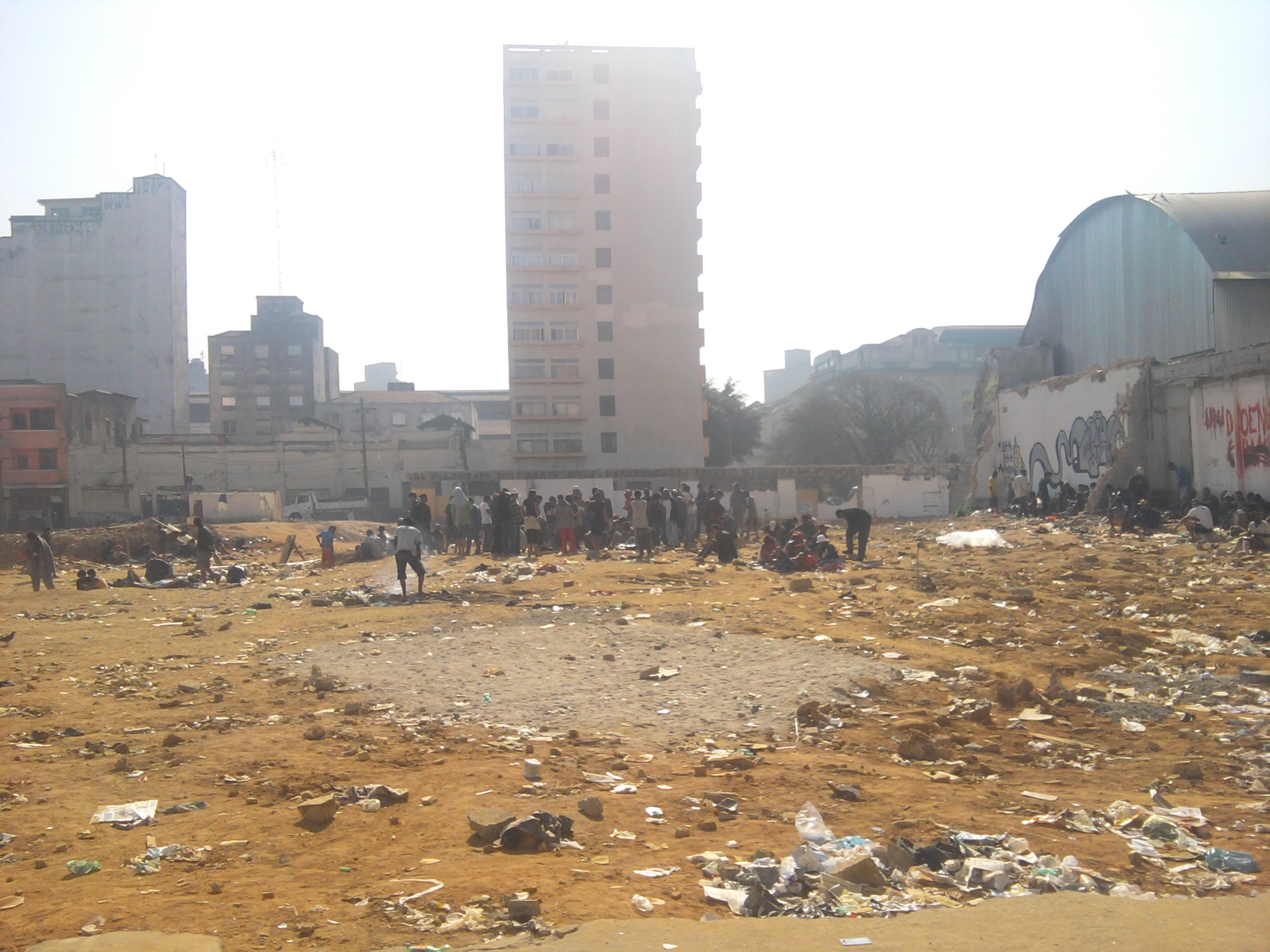
- An area of Cracolândia, in downtown São Paulo.
- Interactive map of Cracolândia
- Country: Brazil
- State: São Paulo
- City: São Paulo
- Districts: Santa Cecilía; República

Population (2023)
  - Total: 529

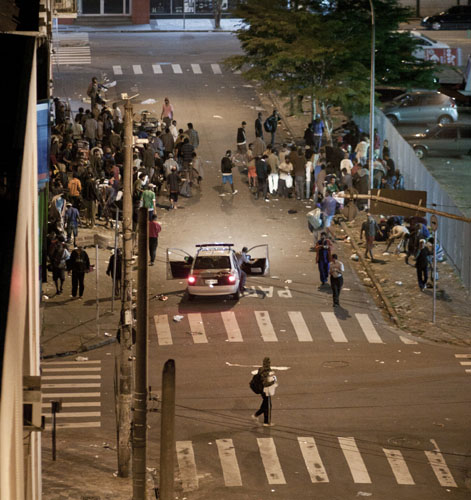
Police officers dispersing a gathering in Gusmões Street

Cracolândia, also known as Crackland in English, is a popular denomination for a region of the city of São Paulo, which is notorious for its high incidence of drug trafficking and drug use in public. It is located within the central region of the city, near Luz Station.

== History ==
=== Origins ===
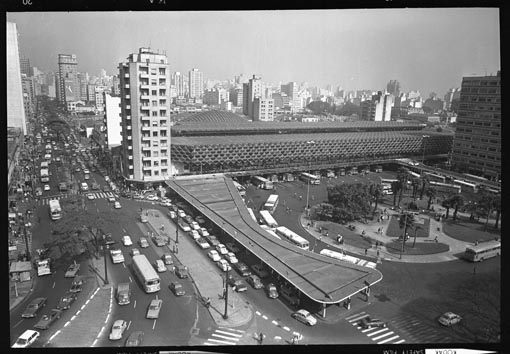
The former Luz Bus Terminal (Terminal Rodoviário da Luz) in the background and Júlio Prestes Square in the foreground, in 1975

Cracolândia emerged in the 1990s. Researcher Bruno Paes Manso identifies two coinciding factors that allowed Cracolândia to form: the former Luz Bus Terminal was already a traditional drug-dealing location in the city, with the trade allegedly protected by local civil police, resulting in a high supply of drugs. Demand came from massacres in the outskirts of São Paulo, which forced drug users, referred to as “noias,” to move to the city center, where they found a safer place.

The gradual closure of the Juquery Psychiatric Hospital, a symbol of Brazil's institutional asylum model, and the formation of the area are interconnected phenomena in the recent history of public mental-health and social-assistance policies. Juquery, founded at the end of the 19th century, housed thousands of people for decades, including individuals with mental disorders, substance dependence, and other social vulnerabilities. With the advancement of the anti-asylum movement and psychiatric reform beginning in the 1980s, and especially following Law 10.216/2001, a process of deinstitutionalization began. This resulted in the closure of wards and the release of many former patients into society.

However, the transition from the asylum model to care within the community was not accompanied by a sufficiently developed network of social and mental-health support. Many former patients of the hospital, lacking family ties or access to housing and employment, ended up homeless. This context coincided with the urban deterioration of central São Paulo and the arrival of crack cocaine in the 1990s, factors that contributed to the formation of Cracolândia as an area where people experiencing extreme vulnerability became concentrated, many of them with a history of institutionalization.

Thus, the parallel between the closure of Juquery and Cracolândia reveals a central challenge of Brazil's psychiatric reform: freedom without support can turn into abandonment. The absence of integrated mental-health, social-assistance, and housing policies caused some former psychiatric-hospital patients to migrate to the streets and later to places such as Cracolândia. The phenomenon demonstrates that overcoming the asylum model requires not only closing institutions, but also effectively building networks of care and social inclusion; otherwise, exclusion may simply be perpetuated in new urban territories.

=== Attempts at control ===
The administration of Mayor José Serra, of the PSDB party, closed bars and motels associated with drug trafficking and prostitution, removed homeless people, and increased policing to discourage drug use in the area in 2005. Hundreds of properties, covering an area of 105,000 square meters, were declared to be of public utility and are being expropriated. The program's objective is to make the area attractive to private investment, creating opportunities for companies in the real-estate sector.

In 2007, the São Paulo municipal government, under the administration of Gilberto Kassab of the DEM party, launched a program called the Nova Luz Project to promote the area's redevelopment and revitalization. Among the proposed measures was a tax exemption related to the Urban Property and Land Tax (Imposto sobre a Propriedade Predial e Territorial Urbana, IPTU), intended to encourage the renovation of facades of properties with a taxable value below 300,000 reais.

Critics of the program, however, characterize it as having a hygienist approach, pointing out that the restoration of buildings, squares, parks, and avenues is not accompanied by measures aimed at the most vulnerable groups who live or work in the area—many of whom are being summarily expelled. Homeless people are removed, the work of recyclable-material collectors is made more difficult, and crack users and people with crack dependence (many of them children and adolescents), who are prevented from gathering in the area, are forced to wander through neighboring districts in groups, without direction.

=== Displacements ===
Gathering of crack users on General Osório Street, Luz, in 2012

A 2022 Voice of America report on Cracolândia (in Portuguese)

Over the years, Cracolândia has undergone several migrations, involving movements of dispersal and concentration:

- 1990s: Concentration between Protestantes Street and Gusmões Street, southeast of Júlio Prestes Square, near the area where the Luz Bus Terminal operated until 1982.
- 1997: The first major police operation, Tolerância Zero (“Zero Tolerance”), was carried out, causing the group to disperse. During the following years, users remained dispersed in the area south of Júlio Prestes Square, between São João Avenue, Duque de Caxias Avenue, and Cásper Líbero Avenue.
- March 2005: Following the Limpa (“Clean-Up”) operation, the previous territory was reduced by approximately half, with the group migrating east of Rio Branco Avenue.
- 2008: Migration toward the area west of Júlio Prestes Square, mainly around Dino Bueno Alley, Cleveland Alley, Glete Street, Helvétia Street, and Princesa Isabel Square.
- 2012: The Sufoco (“Suffocation”) operation took place, dispersing the users.
- 2013–2016: The social program De Braços Abertos (“Open Arms”) was implemented, and the group returned to an area of roughly the same extent as in 2008.
- May 2017: Following demolitions carried out by the municipal government, users dispersed into neighboring areas.
- 2022: The Caronte (“Charon”) operation in Princesa Isabel Square caused dispersal into several surrounding areas.
- August 2023: Concentration on Gusmões Street.
- 2023–2025: The group moved to Protestantes Street and, following further operations, to Marshal Deodoro Square, with frequent dispersals to streets surrounding Santa Cecília and Campos Elíseos.

Between 2020 and 2025, the area ceased to be a fixed location and began moving between different streets and neighborhoods in central São Paulo. Until 2022, the main concentration was around Júlio Prestes Station, particularly on Helvétia, Gusmões, and Vitória streets. With intensified police operations, users dispersed to adjacent streets, such as Protestantes Street, which became the new epicenter in 2023, at times gathering as many as 400 people. In 2025, following a major police operation, the group moved to Marshal Deodoro Square, in the Santa Cecília area, near the Higienópolis neighborhood. The presence of tents and informal commerce indicated the consolidation of a new hub, although with a smaller concentration of people than in previous years. With each intervention, the pattern was repeated: dispersal followed by regrouping at another location in the city center, demonstrating the resilience of the phenomenon.

== Spread to other neighborhoods ==
In recent years, the Cracolândia phenomenon has ceased to be restricted to central São Paulo and has spread to various neighborhoods throughout the city. According to a survey by the municipal and state governments, dozens of “open drug-use scenes” have already been identified in different areas, totaling 72 Cracolândias across 47 neighborhoods, including affluent neighborhoods and peripheral areas.

Among recent examples is an attempt to establish a new Cracolândia on Francisco Matarazzo Avenue in the western part of the city, which led the municipal government to intensify prevention and dispersal measures in 2025. This process of dispersal and multiplication of crack-use sites is described as a direct result of police operations and repressive policies in the city center, which have led users to migrate to neighborhoods such as Lapa, Barra Funda, Brás, Mooca, Vila Leopoldina, and even peripheral areas.

Experts point out that, unless integrated public policies addressing healthcare, social assistance, and housing are implemented, new Cracolândias will continue to emerge in different parts of the city.

== Social and public health impacts ==
The population of Cracolândia is composed predominantly of people experiencing homelessness, Black people, and people with low levels of education. According to recent surveys, approximately 80% of users did not complete elementary education, 39% live on the streets, and only 27% had accessed a healthcare service during the month preceding the survey. The area has high rates of infectious diseases, such as tuberculosis, HIV, and hepatitis, as well as mental-health problems and violence. The COVID-19 pandemic further aggravated the situation, exposing the precarious hygiene conditions and the difficulty of accessing basic healthcare.[26]

The criminalization of drug use and police repression increased the turnover and dispersal of users, making the work of healthcare and social-assistance teams more difficult. The absence of integrated, long-term policies is identified as one of the main obstacles to addressing the problem.

== Controversies and debates ==
The actions of public authorities have been criticized by experts, NGOs, and international organizations, which point to alleged human-rights violations and the ineffectiveness of repressive measures. Reports emphasize that, despite the operations, Cracolândia persists as a social phenomenon, adapting and moving into new territories.

The debate over gentrification and real-estate interests has also gained prominence, with allegations that removing users facilitates urban real-estate development and property-value appreciation projects in central São Paulo.

== Social programs ==
The period was marked by a shift in public policy, with the abandonment of harm-reduction and social-reintegration initiatives, such as the Braços Abertos ("Open Arms") program, and the adoption of more repressive strategies centered on police operations and forced removal. The city government and the state government began prioritizing the “cleansing” of the area, with daily dispersal operations, the closure of scrap-metal yards and illegal businesses, and the establishment of fixed Military Police bases.

Although these measures reduced the visibility of open drug use in traditional locations, they did not solve the problem; they merely displaced it to other areas. Experts and human rights organizations criticized the approach, arguing that repression increased users’ vulnerability and made access to health and social-assistance services more difficult.

=== Recomeço (2013) ===
The social program known as Recomeço ("Fresh Start") was created by the Government of the State of São Paulo in 2013, under the administration of Geraldo Alckmin of the PSDB party. It lasted until the following year, with an annual cost of approximately 80 million reais, corresponding to an investment of around R$1,350 per month per user served.

=== Braços Abertos (2014–2017) ===
The social program known as Braços Abertos ("Open Arms") was created by the São Paulo City Government under the administration of Fernando Haddad in 2014. It lasted until 2017 and had an annual cost of approximately 12 million reais, corresponding to an investment of around R$1,350 per user served.

The program was based on a harm-reduction and social-reintegration strategy, seeking to help people with drug dependence leave homelessness by providing them with the opportunity to engage in paid work. During the program, participants were provided with subsidized accommodation in inexpensive hotels in the central region and employment sweeping the streets, for which they received 15 reais per day.

The program was considered successful by its proponents, receiving national and international recognition, despite effectively ending in May 2017.

Critics of the program argued, based on field research, that the city government was essentially providing money and accommodation that allowed drug users to remain in the area, continue consuming drugs, and contribute to drug trafficking. They claimed that participants were not required to actually perform street-sweeping work in order to receive the official “allowance.” Tenements and shacks were reportedly quickly converted into hotels enrolled in the program without adequate inspection of the facilities or even the necessary operating permits. The São Paulo State Military Police reported drug trafficking allegedly linked to criminal factions in virtually all of the affiliated hotels and boarding houses. The São Paulo State Public Prosecutor’s Office eventually opened an investigation to examine allegations that public funds were being used to support organized crime.

=== Redenção (2017) ===
The social program known as Redenção (Redemption) was created by the São Paulo Municipal Government under the administration of João Doria of the PSDB party in 2017. It began amid the municipal government’s project to redevelop downtown São Paulo and involved a major police intervention that displaced drug-dependent people from the area they had previously occupied and resulted in the arrest of 38 people. Its implementation began on the morning of May 21, 2017, at the same time as the Virada Cultural event was taking place downtown, ultimately disrupting events scheduled as part of its program.

With the launch of the program, Mayor João Doria Jr. stated:

Não volta mais, não volta mais. Pode afirmar, pode duvidar, mas pode ter certeza, enquanto eu for prefeito de São Paulo, a Cracolândia não vai mais existir. Ali, a partir de agora, é um espaço reconquistado pela cidade, pela cidadania e pelos habitantes que poderão circular com segurança.

“It will not come back, it will not come back. You can assert it, you can doubt it, but you can be certain that as long as I am mayor of São Paulo, Cracolândia will no longer exist. From now on, this is a space reclaimed by the city, by the citizens, and by the residents who will be able to move around safely.”

However, this statement proved premature in light of subsequent developments, as the most significant outcome of the police operation was effectively to relocate Cracolândia. It was initially dispersed into surrounding areas, before becoming concentrated at Princesa Isabel Square, just a few blocks from its original location on Rua Helvétia.

The program initially provided for the involuntary hospitalization of people with drug dependence. The city government sought to make hospitalization possible without requiring, on a case-by-case basis, a judge’s authorization following a medical opinion, relying instead solely on a medical assessment. The São Paulo State Public Prosecutor’s Office (MP-SP) opposed the measure, resulting in a legal dispute between the Prosecutor’s Office and the São Paulo Municipal Government, in which the latter ultimately lost. Despite the city government's legal efforts, the physician and psychiatrist responsible for the program at the time, Arthur Guerra, opposed forced hospitalization.

Because of the way it was initially implemented, the program faced severe criticism from organized sectors of civil society, with some describing it as “barbarism” and even as a “human hunt.” The city’s own Secretary for Human Rights resigned in disagreement with the manner in which the program had been implemented.

lso faced criticism because it was reportedly launched without having been formally regulated, meaning that it was put into practice before the necessary framework was in place, in what critics characterized as a rushed and improvised implementation. The municipal Secretary of Health, who was directly responsible for providing medical assistance to people addicted to crack cocaine, was reportedly not even aware that the city’s operations were beginning.

== Police operations ==
=== Operation Cracolândia (2012) ===
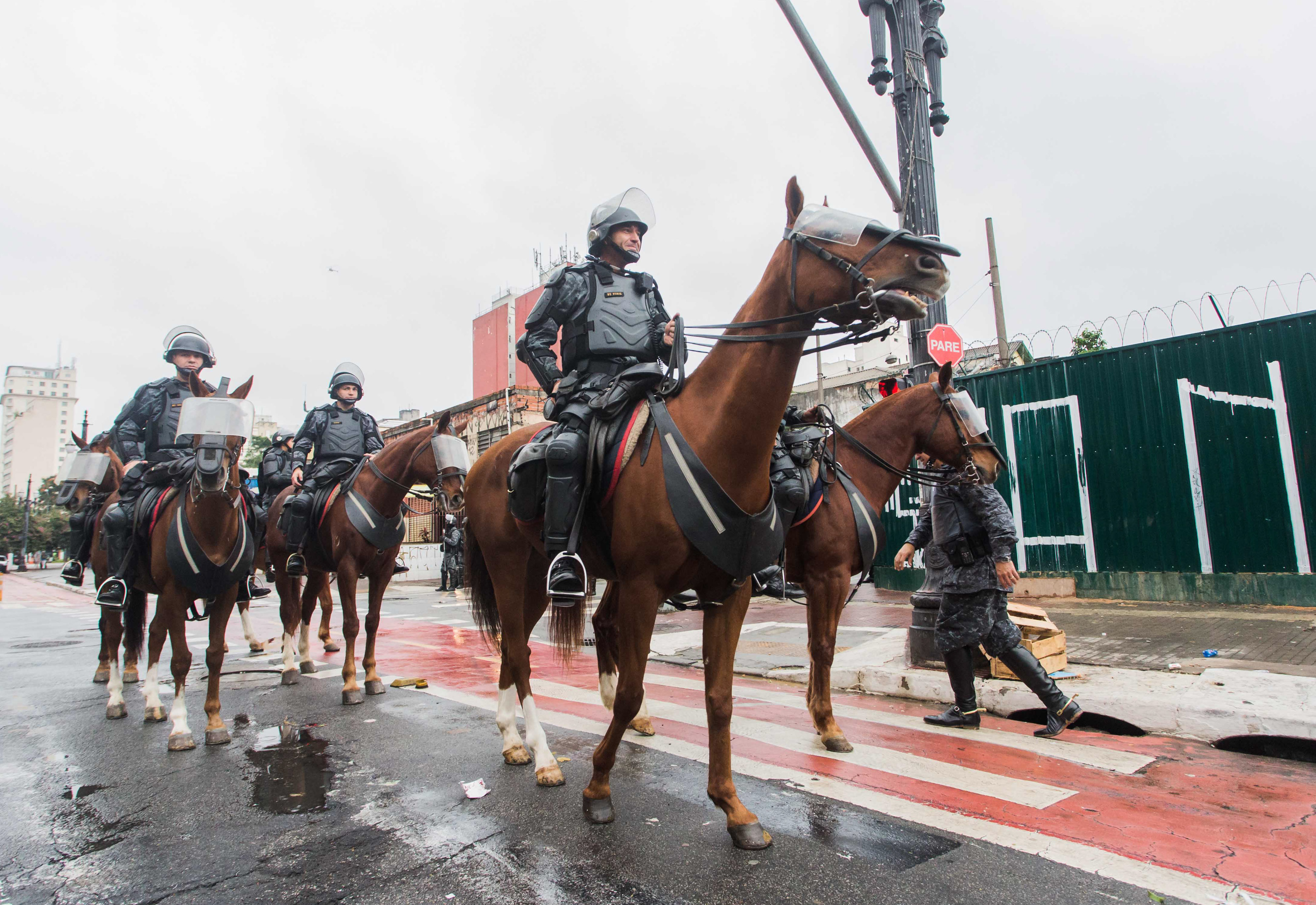
Cracolândia raid in 2012

On January 3, 2012, the São Paulo municipal government, under the administration of Gilberto Kassab of the PSD, launched an operation to combat drug trafficking in the area and provide assistance to crack users, called Operation Centro Legal. By the end of the month, according to the Military Police, Cracolândia had spread to 27 neighborhoods, including Barra Funda, along the CPTM railway tracks, Higienópolis, Luz, Campos Elíseos, Santa Cecília, República, and areas near the Elevado. The media referred to these areas as “mini-Cracolândias.”

According to a report released by the São Paulo state government on January 27, since the beginning of the operation, 155 users had been referred to rehabilitation institutions (hospitalization), 191 people had been arrested in the act, and approximately 63 tons of drugs had been seized, including 3 tons of crack.

=== Operation Charon (2021) ===
It was launched by the São Paulo Civil Police on June 18, 2021, under the 1st Capital Police District, which covers the central area of the city. It was conceived by police chief Roberto Monteiro, who was then head of the district.

According to Civil Police data, more than 1,000 people were arrested during the four years of operations, including 196 leaders of drug-trafficking gangs. However, over those four years, the operation came under scrutiny from the São Paulo Public Defender's Office, including in the sixth phase of the operation, because of the arrest of crack users.

=== Move to Princesa Isabel Square (2022) ===
Cracolândia was temporarily located in Princesa Isabel Square, first in 2017 and again in 2022, but it has since been dispersed from the location

On March 17, 2022, drug users were dispersed across São Paulo. The action was carried out peacefully and was welcomed by residents of Cleveland Street, who organized daily demonstrations to prevent the users from returning.

According to the users, the dispersal occurred on orders from the PCC and to avoid the Regional Special Operations Unit of the Municipal Civil Guard, which reportedly carried out violent actions at least twice a day to facilitate garbage collection.

According to the Civil Police, the organized-crime movement occurred because of police operations, such as Operation Conrad and Operation Charon, which had by then resulted in evictions from hotels in Cracolândia and 91 arrests, including traffickers known as Gatinha da Cracolândia and Abelha Rainha. Following the operations, the flow of users declined by between 40% and 60% because of seizures carried out at all levels of the drug trade, making access to drugs more difficult.

The dispersal occurred shortly before the inauguration of the state-run Pérola Byington Hospital on Alameda Glete and after the completion of resurfacing work on Cleveland Street. One day later, Governor João Doria visited Cracolândia to announce the public notice for selecting the hospital's administrators. There had been rumors of a police operation related to the construction. He had already announced the end of Cracolândia in 2017.

The users attempted to occupy places such as General Osório Square and Júlio Mesquita Square in Santa Ifigênia, but the Municipal Civil Guard increased its personnel to prevent them from doing so.

Alexis Vargas, the municipal executive secretary for Strategic Projects, stated that Cracolândia had not yet ended, but that this represented an important victory. The users managed to reestablish themselves in Princesa Isabel Square.

This was not the first time the square had been occupied. In 2017, a major operation involving 900 officers had expelled the drug traffickers. Drone footage from the São Paulo city government showed that the action had been planned for more than a month.

According to Roberto Monteiro, the chief of the 1st Central Police District, at least one-third of the users occupied the square, while the rest remained between Paulista Avenue and Doutor Arnaldo Avenue.

The area was occupied by different factions, and homeless people who had lost their income because of COVID-19 feared for their safety. Businesses in the surrounding area were also affected.

The city government assessed that the situation made police intervention more difficult because the operations would need to be more conspicuous, something Mayor Ricardo Nunes wanted to avoid.

== Popular culture ==
- Cracolândia is prominently featured in Verdades Secretas when a model becomes addicted to crack which leads to her eventually becoming homeless living in the area.

== See also ==
- Skid row
