= Nina Pandolfo =

Brazilian street artist

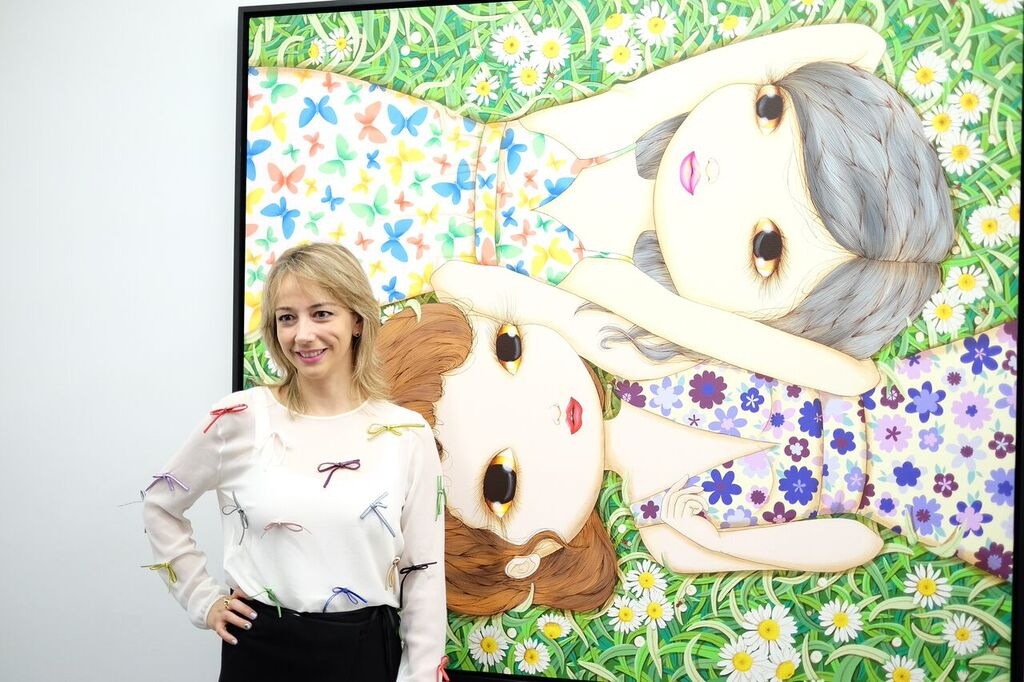
- Nina Pandolfo with her artwork (2015)
- Born: 1977 (age 48–49); Tupã, São Paulo, Brazil
- Known for: Street art
- Website: Official website

Nina Pandolfo (born 1977) is a Brazilian street artist.

== Life ==
Nina Pandolfo was born in 1977 in Tupã, São Paulo. She started drawing and painting at the age of 3. At the age of 12, Nina Pandolfo started tagging public walls. She later became part of the group whose graffiti art featured in galleries and museums.

== Work ==
Using plastic, latex, and resin, Pandolfo makes use of a wide variety of materials. Her work includes themes that draw from childhood and nature. She paints female subjects with wide-eyed, childish features in mysterious environments. Her characters evolve into more sophisticated forms with deeper more contemplative gazes.

One of Pandolfo's projects includes her partner work with Brazilian artists Os Gêmeos twins and Francisco Rodrigues da Silva (Nunca). In 2007, the four painted the facade and curtain of the 800-year-old Kelburn Castle in Fairlie, North Ayrshire, in Scotland. The work is now a permanent feature of this historic building.

Pandolfo's most recent work, "Little Things for Life", is an exhibition and a gigantic mural featured on the Rivington Street Wall located on the Lower East Side Side in New York City. Her debut solo exhibition was held across the street at Rivington Street Gallery. This new body of work was inspired by her perception of small details in everyday life.

== Exhibitions ==
- 2007: Beyond Street Art, Düsseldorf, Germany
- 2007: Wholetrain Project, Nordeste Tour: Recife, Natal and João Pessoa, Brazil
- 2008: Aos Nossos Olhos, Galeria Leme, São Paulo, Brazil
- 2008: Between Us, Gallery Maskara, Mumbai, India
- 2009: Queenz Arrive, McCaig-Welles Gallery, Brooklyn, NY
- 2009: Graffiti Gone Global, SushiSamba, Miami, FL
- 2009: The Wynwood Walls, Deitch Projects x Goldman Properties, Miami, FL
- 2010: Life’s Flavor, Carmichael Gallery, Los Angeles, CA
- 2012: Spice Angels, Lazarides, London
- 2015: Little things for life, Coburn Projects, New York City
- 2016: Beyond Meninas, Lazarides, London
