= Campos Eliseos Palace =

Brazilian historical building

- Palácio dos Campos Elíseos
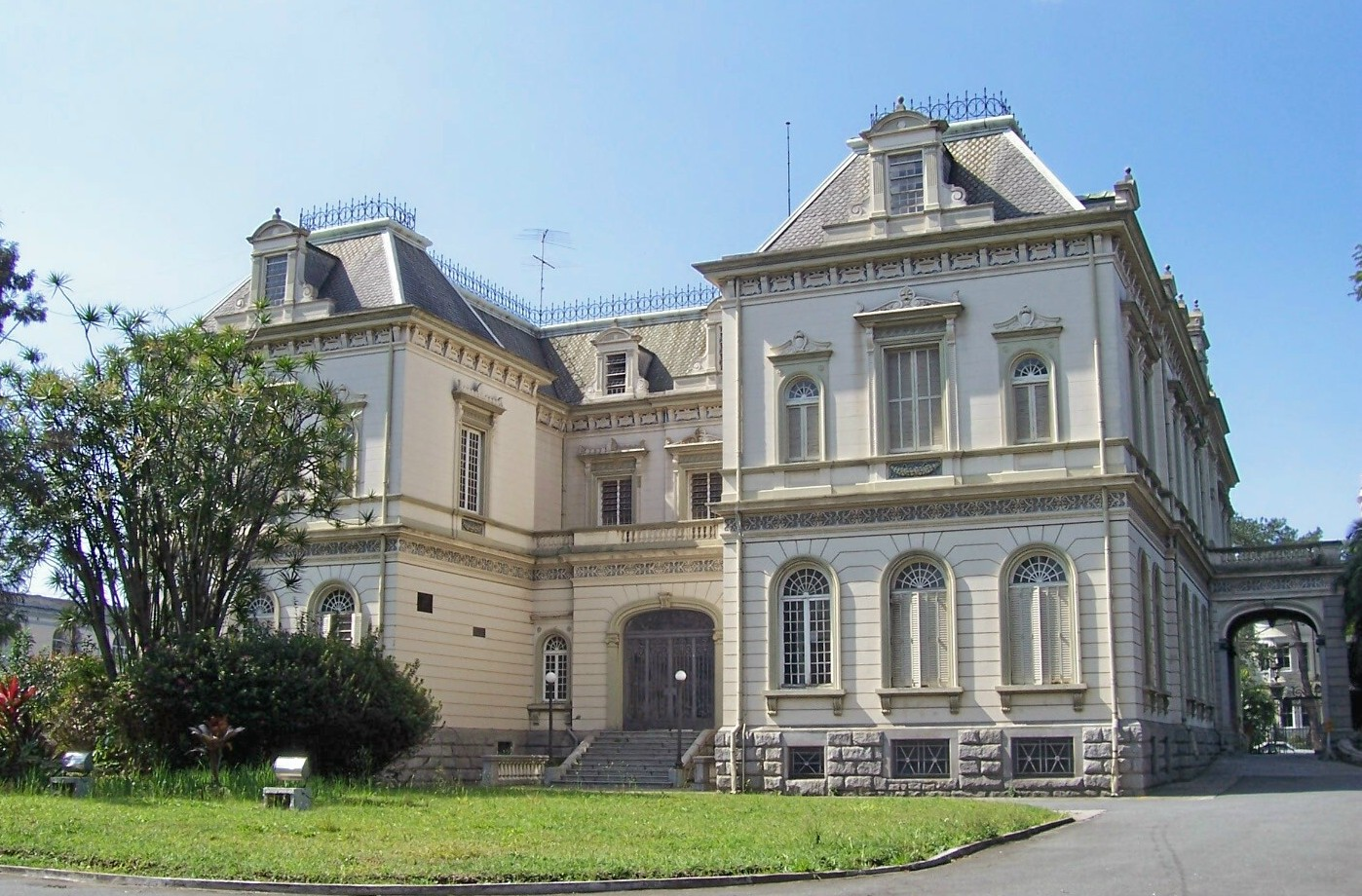
- Former name: Elias Chaves' Residence
- Established: 1899
- Location: Campos Elíseos, São Paulo, Brazil
- Coordinates: 23°32′00.82″S 46°38′42.32″W
- Type: Palace, Museum

The Campos Elíseos Palace (Portuguese: Palácio dos Campos Elíseos), formerly known as the Elias Chaves' Residence (Portuguese: Palacete Elias Chaves), is located on Rio Branco Avenue in the center of São Paulo. It was designed by German architect Matheus Häusler, with construction initiated in 1890 and completed in 1899. The building was originally intended to serve as the residence of coffee grower and politician Elias Antônio Pacheco e Chaves.

The structure spans four floors and covers 4,000 square meters, with its design inspired by the Château d'Écouen in France. The construction incorporated technological innovations introduced from Europe, with most materials sourced internationally, including mirrors from Venice, porcelain doorknobs from Sèvres, terracotta from Italy, and locks and hinges from the United States. In 1915, the palace was renamed “Campos Eliseos Palace” when it became the official seat of government and residence of the São Paulo state government. At this time, the original bars surrounding the building were replaced with high walls that obscured it from view.

In 1967, a fire necessitated the relocation of both the seat of government and the governor's residence to the Bandeirantes Palace (Palácio dos Bandeirantes) in Morumbi. Since then, the Campos Elíseos Palace has undergone multiple restoration efforts, including an exterior restoration carried out between March 2008 and 2010. The building was officially listed as a heritage site in 1977 by the Council for the Defense of Historical, Archaeological, Artistic, and Tourist Heritage (Conselho de Defesa do Patrimônio Histórico, Arqueológico, Artístico e Turístico - CONDEPHAAT).

== History ==
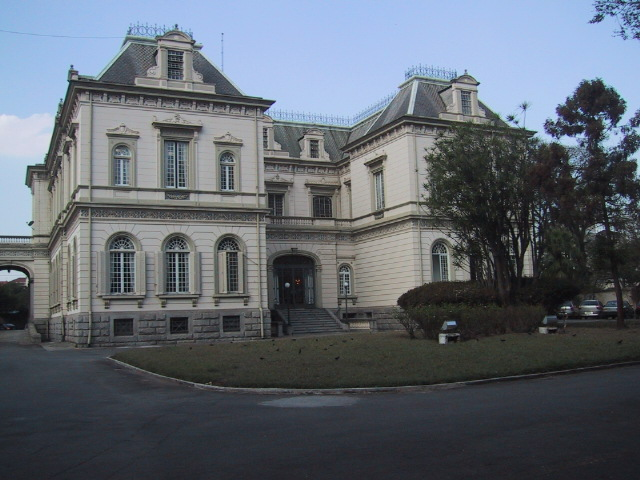
Campos Eliseos Palace

At the end of the 19th century, the palace was commissioned by the coffee grower Elias Antônio Pacheco e Chaves, in the Campos Eliseos district, a neighborhood that was becoming a prominent area in São Paulo. The name Campos Eliseos originates from the Parisian Champs-Élysées Avenue. Between 1890 and 1899, the palace was designed by architect Matheus Häusler, who also worked on the construction of the Chá Viaduct (Viaduto do Chá).

The Campos Elíseos Palace is an important example of São Paulo's architecture, reflecting the economic significance of the coffee trade during the late 19th century.

In 1903, the original owner died, and the property was inherited by family members who resided there until 1911 when it was sold to the state. After the acquisition, the former Elias Chaves' residence was renamed the Campos Eliseos Palace. From 1912, the palace functioned as a residence for political leaders, starting with President-Councilor Rodrigues Alves. It housed state governors until 1924, during the administration of Carlos de Campos. In the São Paulo Revolt of 1924, the building was occupied by revolutionaries for approximately 20 days and sustained damage from bombings. Additional damage occurred during the Constitutionalist Revolution in 1932. In 1930, the movement's victory displaced Júlio Prestes and Heitor Penteado, the leaders of the government at the time.

=== Decay process ===
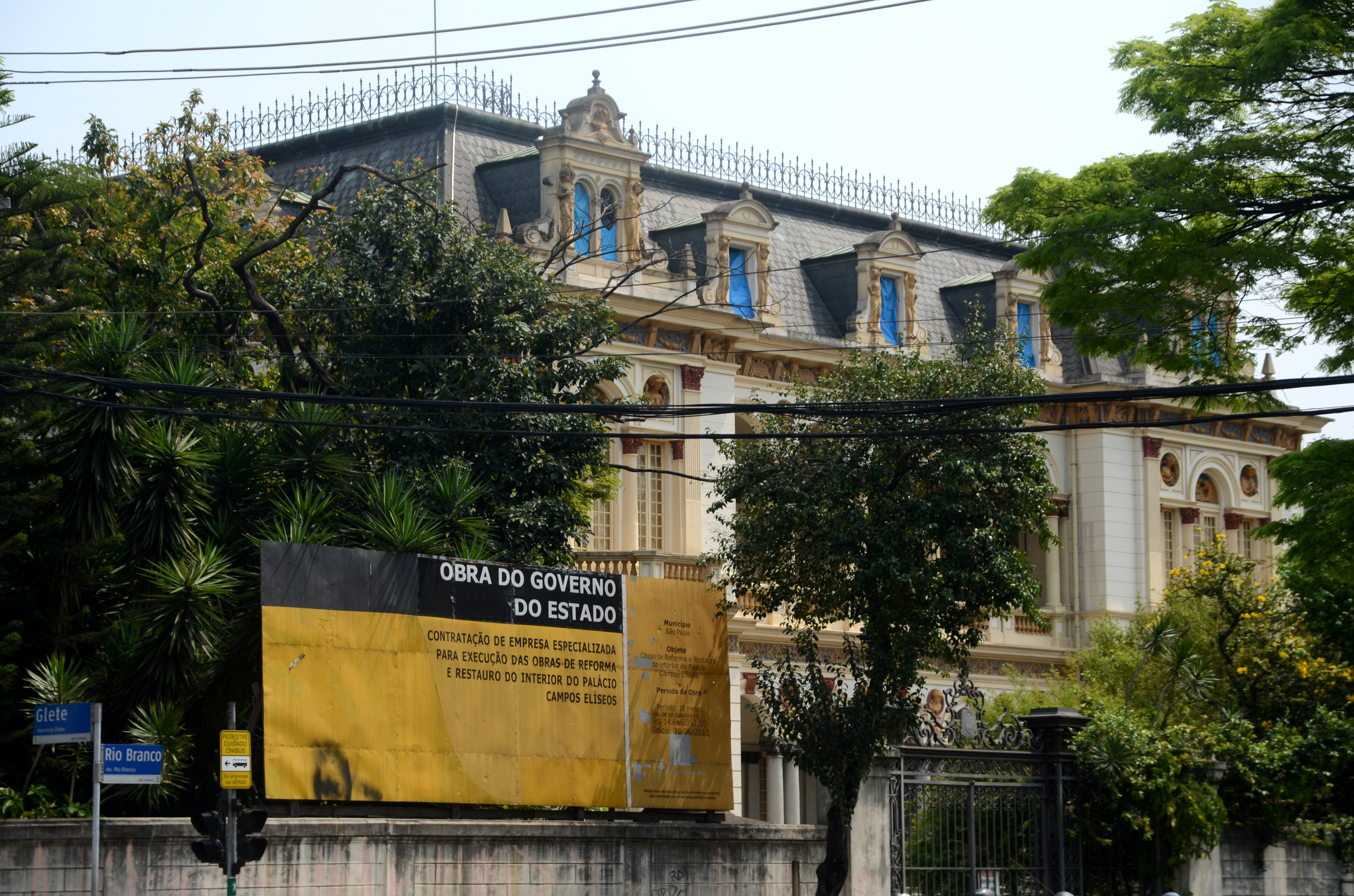
Campos Eliseos Palace

In the 1960s, with the move of politicians' residences to the Bandeirantes Palace in Morumbi, the Campos Eliseos Palace was repurposed to become home to some state secretariats. At the same time, there were discussions about the future of the building, including potential demolition, but bodies such as the CONDEPHAAT and the Historical and Geographical Institute of Guarujá-Bertioga (Instituto Histórico e Geográfico Guarujá-Bertioga) called for the palace to be preserved. However, an accidental fire on the roof of the building in 1967 destroyed a large part of its structure.

=== Fire ===
On October 17, 1967, a fire broke out in the palace, which was still home to then-governor Abreu Sodré and his family. The fire started on the roof at around 7:40 p.m. and lasted 15 minutes, destroying a large part of the building. The palace was at the end of a nine-month renovation. Everyone in the building was evacuated without injury, and the governor was dispatched from the Bandeirantes Palace. Maria Sodré, Abreu Sodré's wife, was responsible for saving some of the works of art that decorated the palace. After the incident, some renovations were made to rebuild part of the destroyed building.

After the fire, some renovations were carried out to rebuild the palace which, from then on, saw little use. For a time, it was used to house secretariats of the State of São Paulo. In the 1970s, the building was designated a historic landmark by the CONDEPHAAT.

=== Restoration process ===
In 2004, the São Paulo state government announced a project to restore the palace to become a cultural center containing part of the city's history. However, the project was postponed due to a lack of funds.

In 2008, Governor José Serra announced that he would resume the project to restore the Campos Eliseos Palace, with the idea of making it an extension of the Bandeirantes Palace, but the project did not progress as planned. The façade was rebuilt during this period at a cost estimated at 3.65 million reais.

In 2013, restoration work began by the state government with a completion date of 2015, and the museum was scheduled to open in 2016, but the work was only completed in 2017. As a result, the palace underwent recovery, requalification, and restoration work and the investment amounted to 20 million reais. In addition, following legal requirements, the space was adapted in terms of accessibility and safety.

Today, the palace's Renaissance architecture is located near the Princesa Isabel bus terminal and is surrounded by gates and 2-meter-high walls for preservation purposes. The completion of the Campos Eliseos Palace Restoration Project, as well as becoming a cultural museum where it will tell its own story, is intended to contribute to the revitalization of the area.

=== National Reference Center for Entrepreneurship, Technology, and the Creative Economy ===
In July 2017, the state government allowed temporary use of the property at no direct cost for 5 years by São Paulo's Micro and Small Business Support Service (Serviço de Apoio às Micro e Pequenas Empresas de São Paulo - SEBRAE-SP), for the installation of the National Reference Center for Entrepreneurship, Technology, and the Creative Economy (Centro Nacional de Referência em Empreendedorismo, Tecnologia e Economia Criativa) - SEBRAE-SP. According to State Decree 62.699, of July 14, 2017, in return, SEBRAE-SP will have to offer free visits to exhibitions with themes on entrepreneurship, technology, and the creative economy, as well as visits by teachers and students from the public school system; hold training courses in entrepreneurial education for public school teachers; offer coworking space and training for projects focused on the creative economy and create a space for the memory of the Palace and the region.

On April 3, 2018, the National Reference Center for Entrepreneurship, Technology, and the Creative Economy was inaugurated and the first activities occupied the second floor of the building: a coworking space, a startup accelerator with 11 selected startups participating in the program, meeting rooms, two training rooms and the administrative area of SEBRAE-SP.

=== Favelas Museum ===
After several years of research and proposals for the creation of a new cultural museum within the palace's spaces, the Favelas Museum (Museus das Favelas) was officially inaugurated on November 20, 2022, in the context of a broader movement to democratize cultural spaces and preserve the memories of historically marginalized populations. The Museum promotes exhibitions, debates, workshops, and educational activities that directly involve peripheral residents, addressing issues such as racism, cultural resistance, and social inequality.

=== Secretariat of Justice and Citizenship ===
Under Tarcísio de Freitas' administration, the Campos Eliseos Palace became home to the Secretariat of Justice and Citizenship of the State of São Paulo (Secretaria de Justiça e Cidadania) on September 23, 2024. This change is part of the project "Campos Elíseos Administrative Center" (Centro Administrativo de Campos Elíseos), which aims to concentrate state secretariats and departments in the center of São Paulo.

== Characteristics ==
=== Architecture ===
Designed by the architect Matheus Häusler, the 4,000-square-meter building was inspired by the architecture of the Château d'Écouen in France and decorated by the Italian architect Claudio Rossi. Divided into four floors, the building consisted of a basement, first floor, second floor, and finally an attic. The palace was built using a new brick wall architecture. Wood was also used extensively for the roofs and staircases inside the palace. Most of the materials for the construction were imported from European regions such as Italy and France, as well as from the United States. Crystals from Venice, porcelain from Sèvres, and bronze fittings from the United States are some of the materials imported. Brazilian joinery and metalwork were also used.

The building had Venetian mirrors, Baccarat chandeliers, and porcelain doorknobs, materials that were also imported from European countries and the United States.

=== Historical-cultural significance ===
The Campos Eliseos Palace played a role in significant moments in São Paulo's and Brazil's history, such as the 1924 and 1932 Revolutions, and went through the political period of the Vargas Era and the Estado Novo, as well as housing the most important political figures in the city of São Paulo from 1912 until the 1960s.

=== Listing process ===
The process of listing the Campos Eliseos Palace was filed in 1970, under number 16265/1970. It was concluded on August 2, 1977, and the palace was registered in the Livro do Tombo — a document that registers all the historical buildings listed in Brazil — under inscription 114, page 17, on June 26, 1979.

== Gallery ==
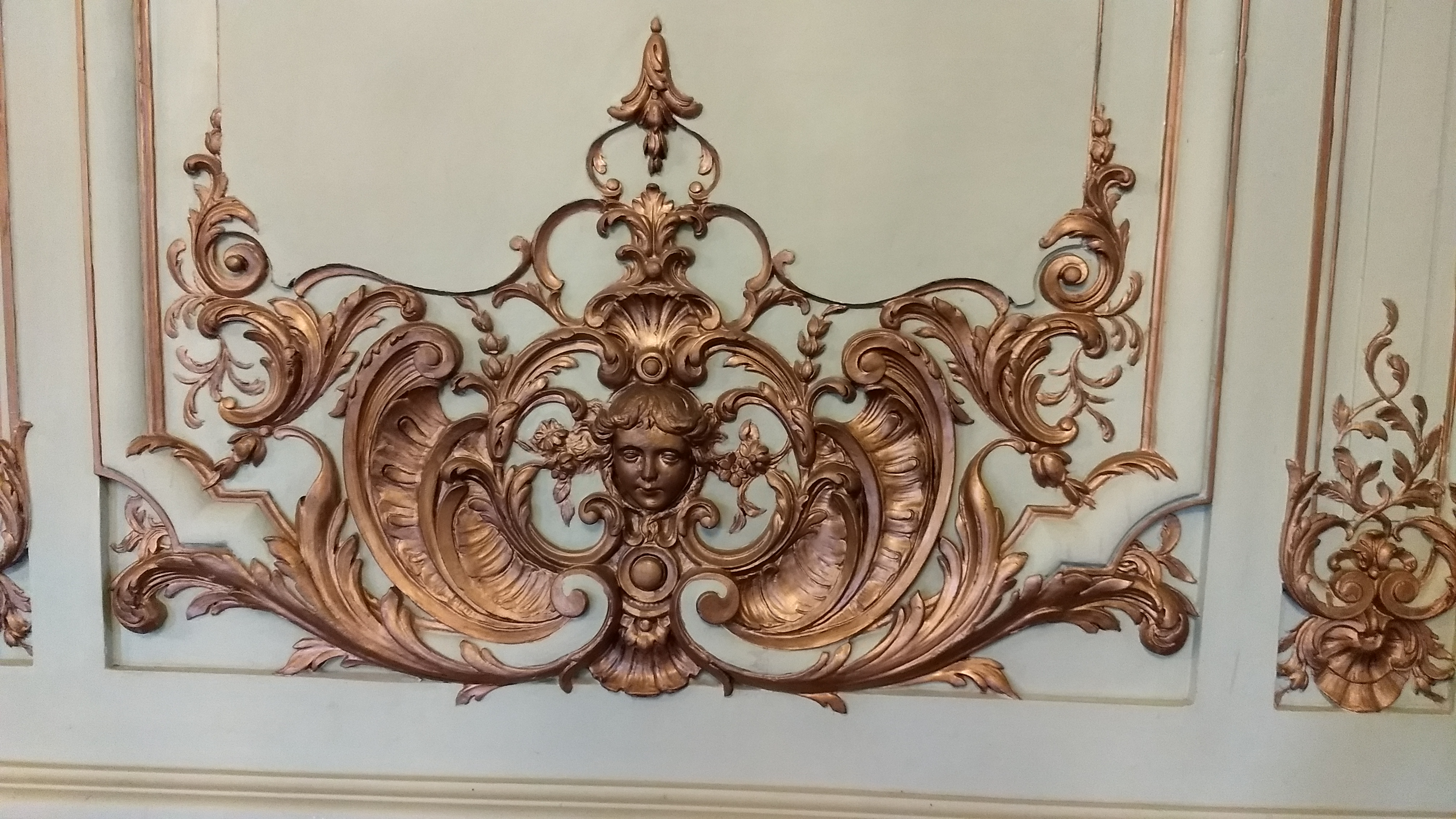
Detail on the first floor wall room.

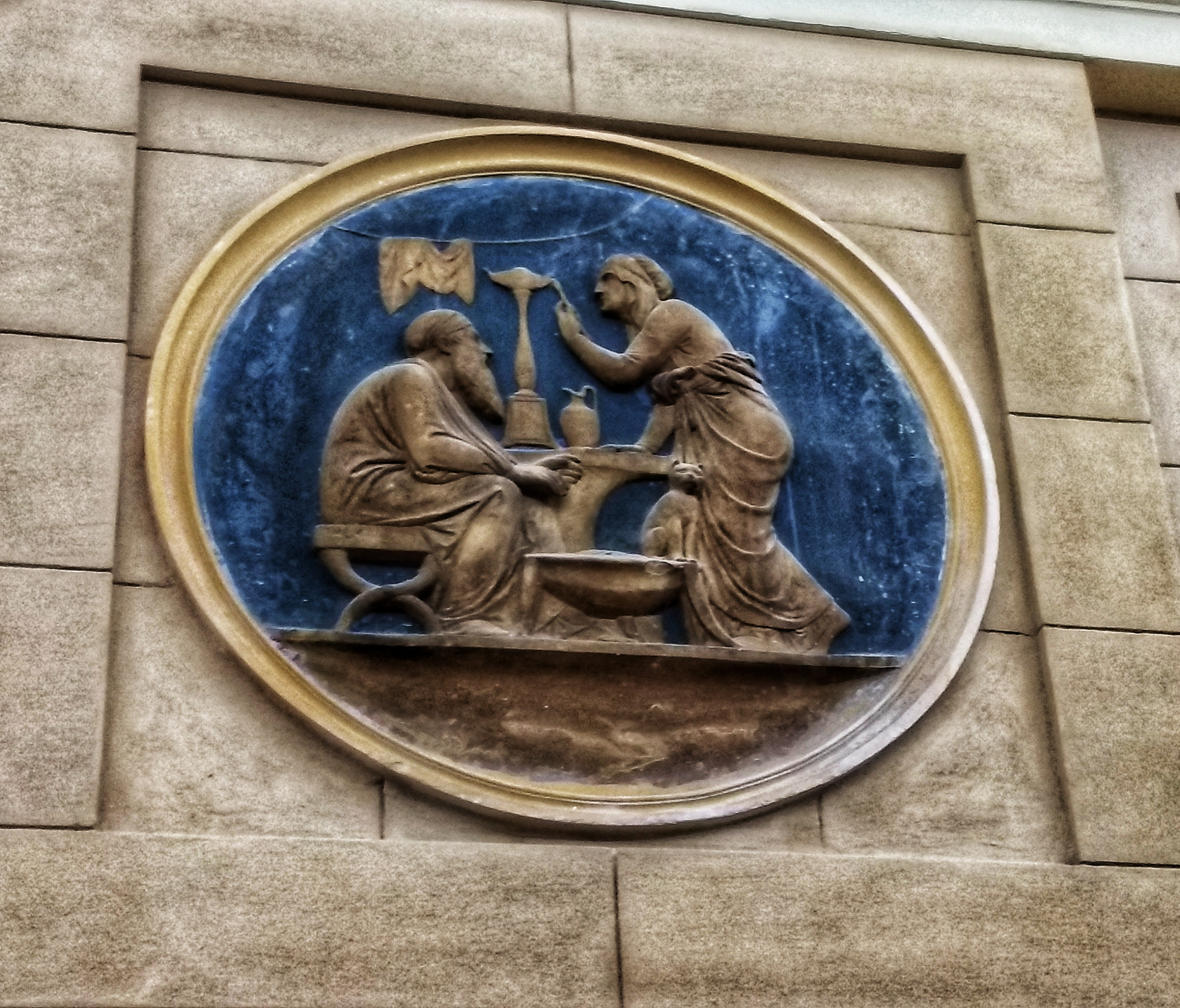
Detail on the first floor wall.

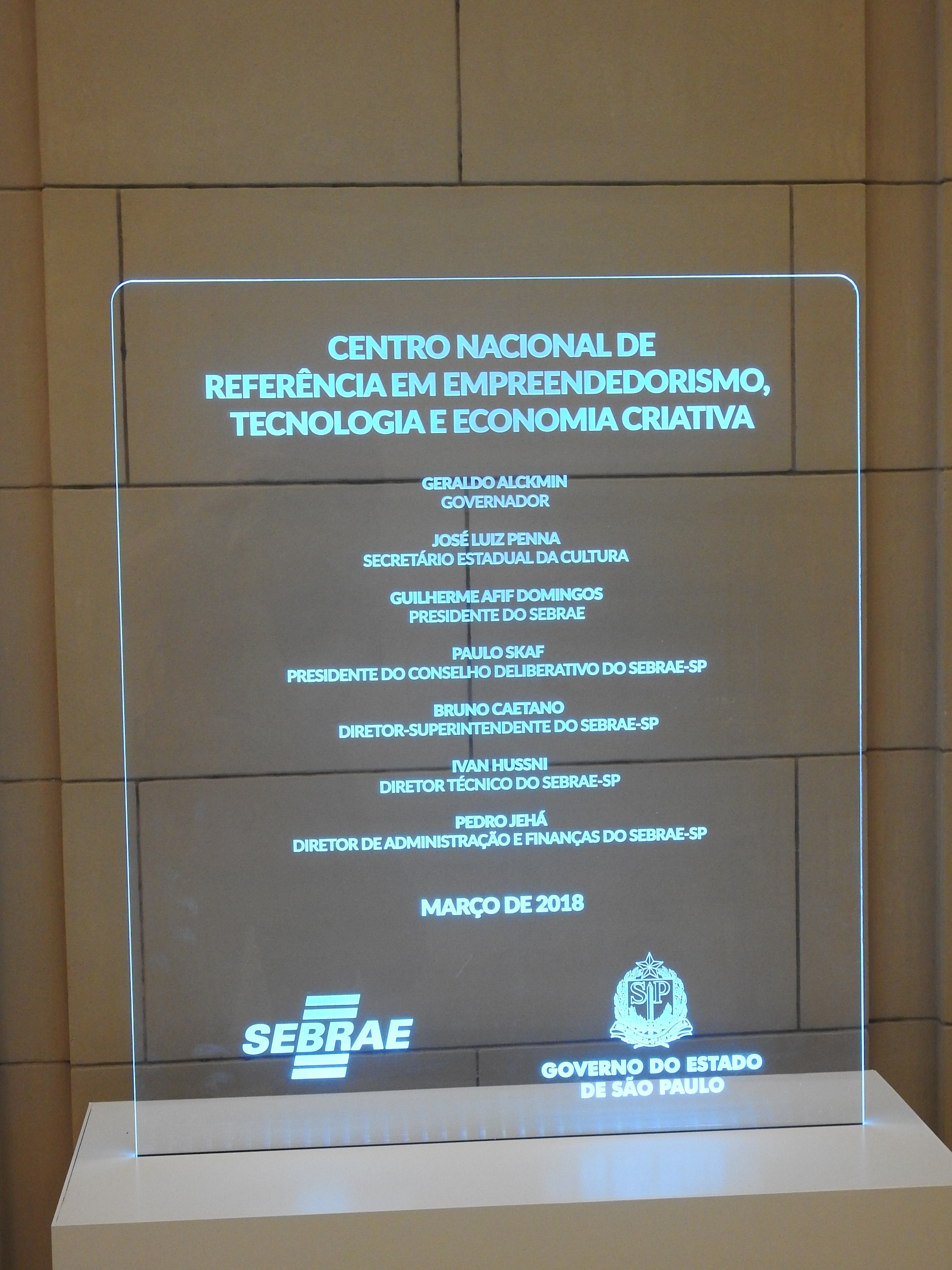
Inauguration plaque for the National Reference Center for Entrepreneurship, Technology, and the Creative Economy - SEBRAE-SP.

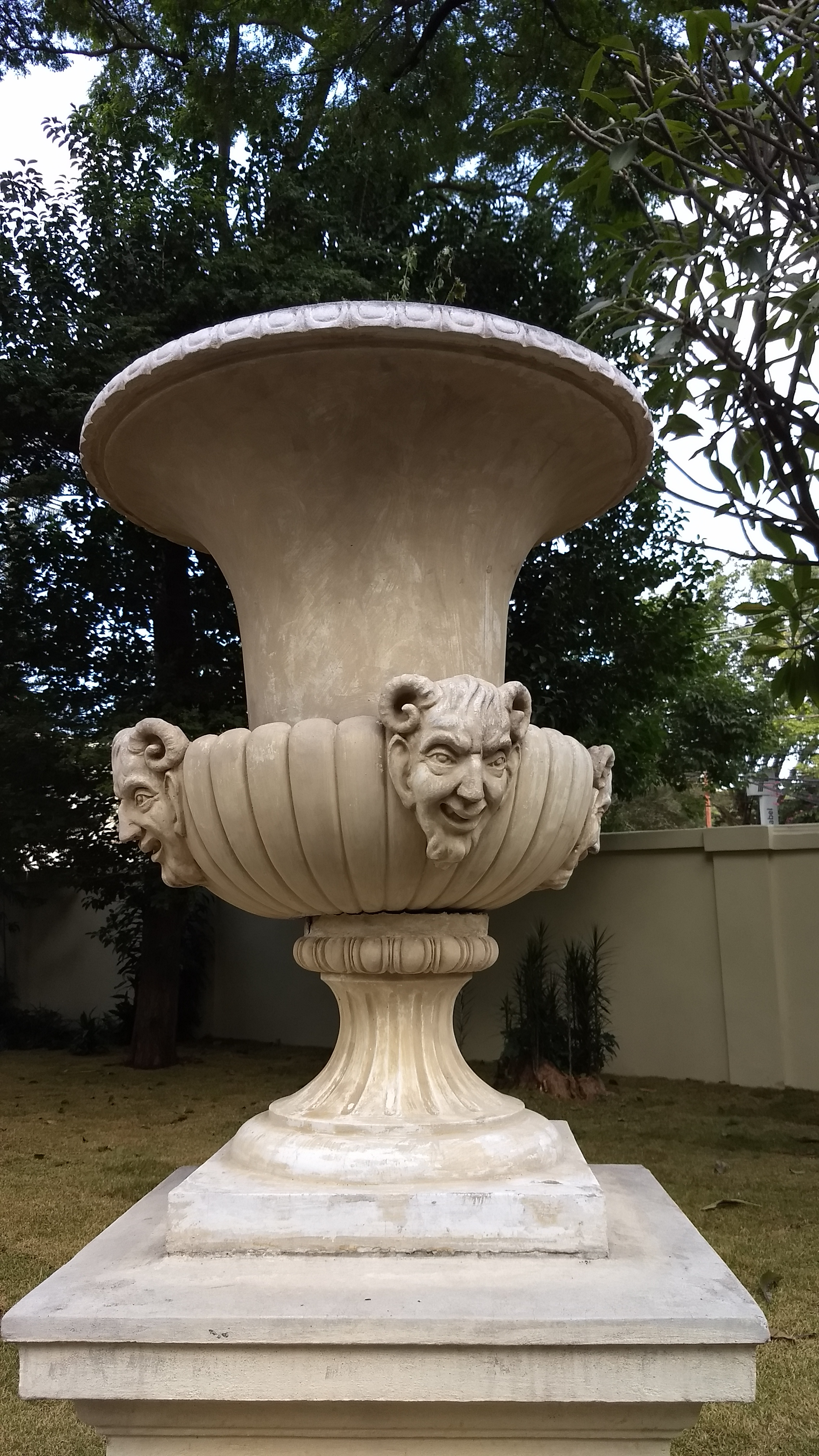
Palace Garden.

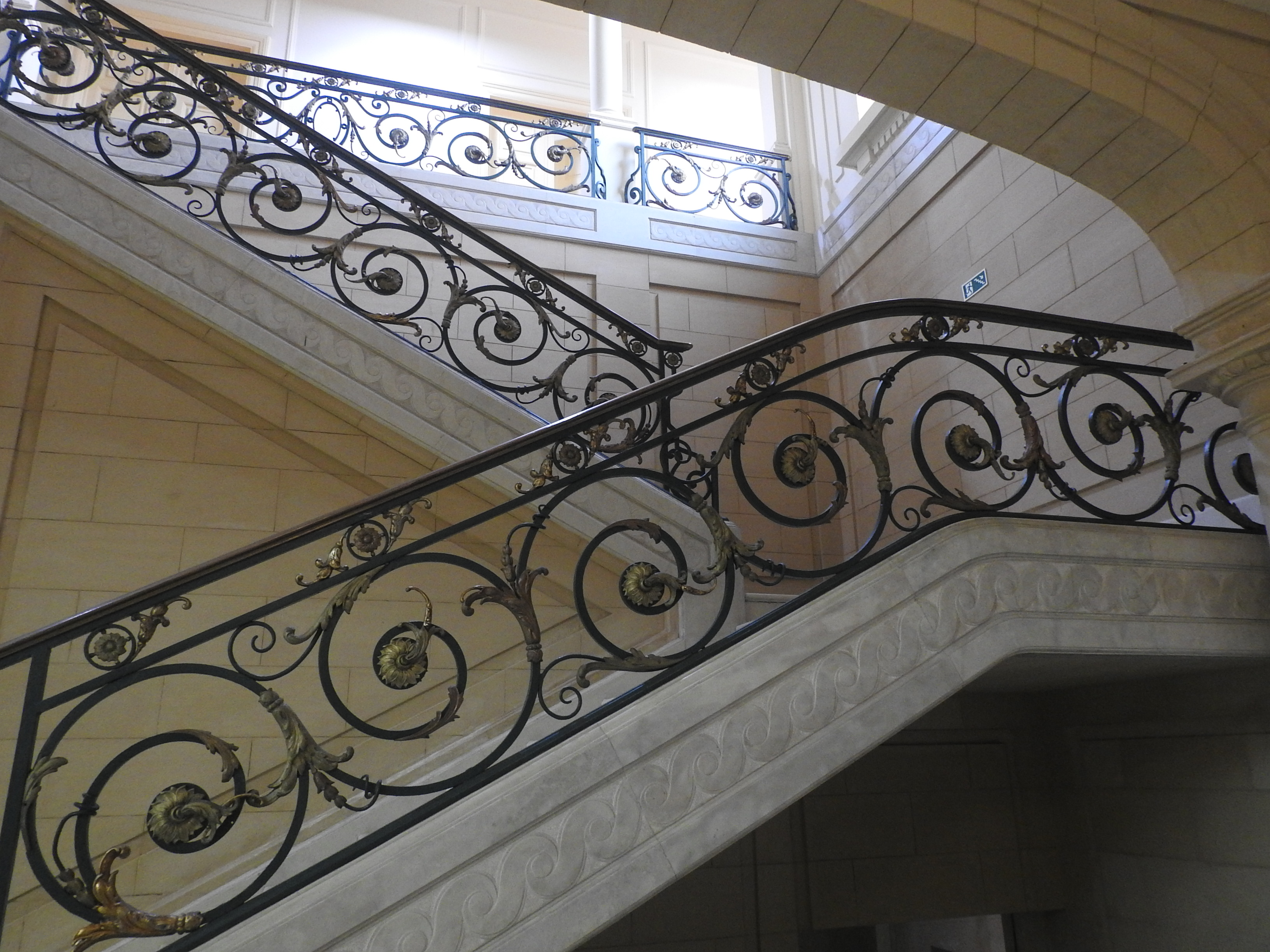
Stairs to the first floor.

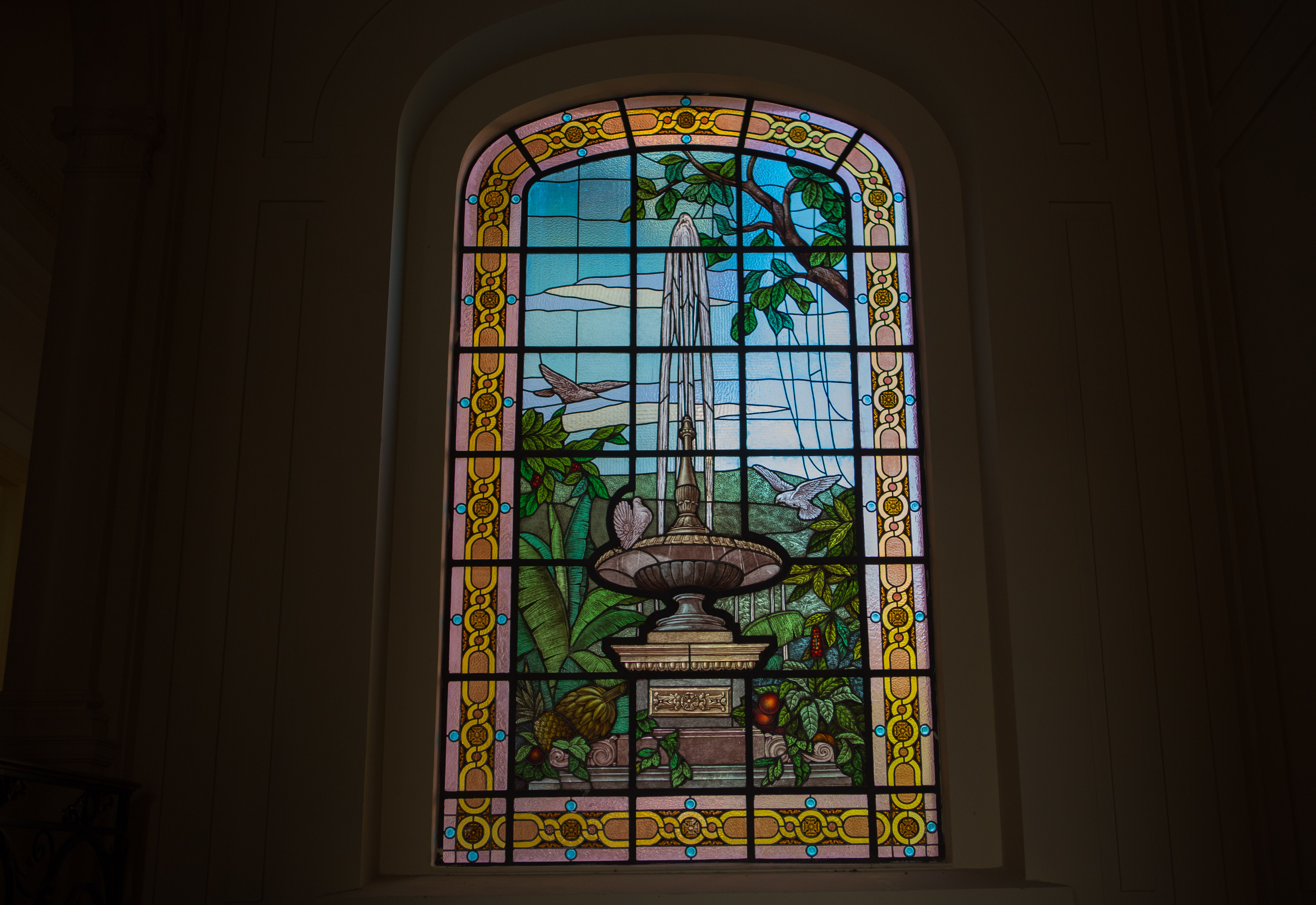
Stained glass.

== See also ==
- Mannerism in Brazil
- Palácio dos Bandeirantes
- Baruel Mansion
- Brazilian Belle Époque
