= Francisco Rodrigues da Silva =

Brazilian artist

- Born: Francisco Rodrigues da Silva; 1983 (age 42–43); São Paulo, Brazil
- Other name: Nunca
- Known for: Street art, painting
- Notable work: 23 de Maio Expressway mural, Tate Modern Street Art Exhibition (2008)
- Movement: Graffiti, Urban art

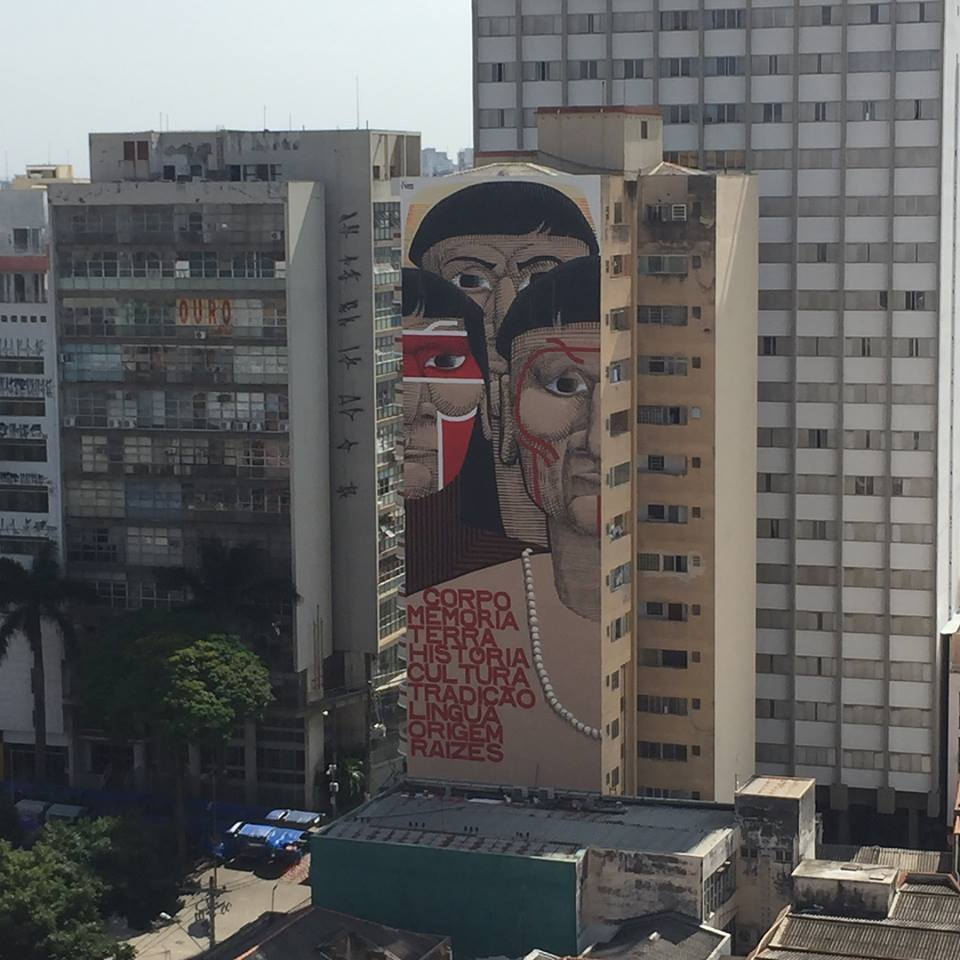
Nunca Mural, Frestas Triennial Sorocaba, Brazil 2017

Francisco Rodrigues da Silva (* 1983) also known as "Nunca" is a Brazilian graffiti who uses Native Brazilian themes in his art. His artist name "Nunca" means "Never" in Portuguese.

== Career ==
Born in São Paulo, Nunca began his career at the age of 12 as a member of a gang spraying pichações - a Brazilian alternative tag - on walls in Itaquera, the poor neighborhood in eastern São Paulo where the family lived. He then developed his own style, a mix of colors and lines putting together Brazilian traditions and contemporary claims.

After his family moved to Aclimação, in the south-central part of the city, he began painting graffiti. Nuna painted brightly coloured figures inspired by indigenous Brazilian culture. Nunca later began to paint canvases and produce sculptures.

== Influences ==
Nunca's style mimics antique etching, techniques used by the conquistadors to portray indigenous tribes and depict the New World, and local iconography with modern treatments. He paints with a mixture of antique and contemporary references. His work has inspired many other street artists. His influence grew worldwide after being the youngest artist exhibited in a major show at the Tate Modern museum in London in 2008. He has worked closely with other major figures on the São Paulo graffiti scene including Os Gêmeos (the artist twins Otavio and Gustavo Pandolfo) and Otavio Pandolfo's wife, Nina.

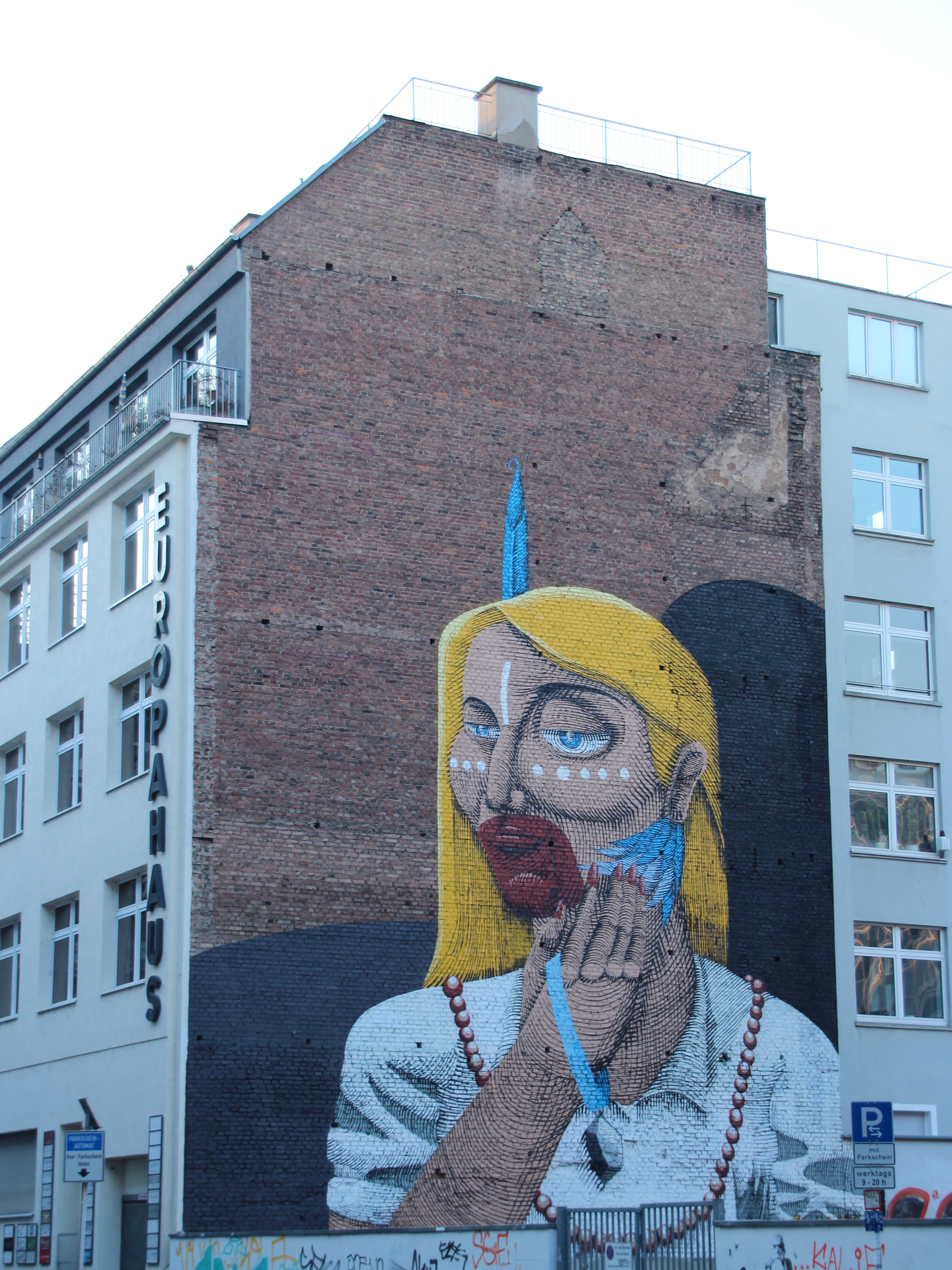
Nunca mural in Frankfurt

== 23 de Maio expressway Wall ==
Having developed their reputation in São Paulo Nunca and the Pandolfos were invited to participate in a street-art exhibition at the Tate Modern Gallery in London that led to a significant re-evaluation of their work by their home city. Following the introduction by the Mayor of São Paulo Gilberto Kassab of the "Cidade Limpa" ("Clean City") law aimed at eliminating forms of visual pollution, including graffiti, an official clean-up campaign led to many images being lost and others damaged. A 680-meter mural painted by the Pandolfos, Nunca and Otavio Pandolfo's wife Nina on retaining walls along the 23 de Maio expressway was half-obliterated with gray paint despite having been officially approved. Recognition abroad of the significance of the artists' work stimulated a public discussion of what constituted art which led to the creation of a registry of street art to be preserved by the city of São Paulo.

== Exhibitions ==
Nunca has exhibited in Brazil at the Museum of Modern Art in São Paulo and in Greece at the AfroBrasil Museum and in the UK at Tate Modern, the first major display of street art at a public museum in London. The brickwork of the Tate Modern's external walls was decorated with paintings 15 metres high by the artists featured in the exhibition, the Pandolfo twins and Nunca, Blu from Bologna, the Parisian artist JR, the New York collaborative group Faile and Sixeart from Barcelona.

Nunca’s other exhibitions include Tag at the Grand Palais in Paris in 2009; The boneyard Project in Arizona in 2012 for which the artist painted the fuselage of a World War II airplane; Hecho En Oaxaca, at the Museo de Arte Contemporaneo in Mexico in 2013; One of the largest figurative mural for the Frestas Triennial of Soroccaba in Brazil in 2017 and Art from the Streets at the ArtScience Museum in Singapore in 2018.

His work has been shown in galleries and institutions around the world including: Hong Kong, Beijing, Miami, Los Angeles, Milan, Bologna, Lisbon, Kyiv etc. Nunca was also the subject of many books and publications, including The Huffington Post, NY and LA Times as well as Art Review.
