= Campos Elíseos (São Paulo) =

Brazilian neighborhood

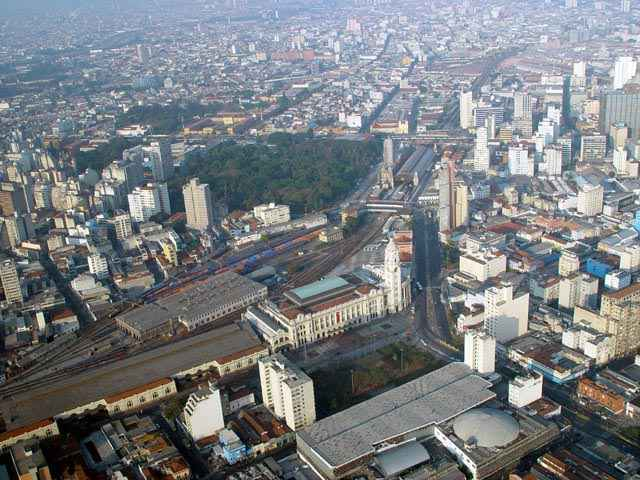
- Interactive map of Campos Elíseos
- Coordinates: 23°32′00″S 46°38′42″W
- Country: Brazil
- State: São Paulo
- District: Santa Cecília
- Foundation: 1878

Campos Elíseos is a neighborhood situated in the district of Santa Cecília, in the Brazilian city of São Paulo. Created in 1878, it is the city's first planned neighborhood. At the time, it consisted mainly of coffee farmers.

It is home to the Campos Elíseos Palace, the former seat of the São Paulo State Government, which belonged to the aristocrat and politician Elias Antônio Pacheco e Chaves. After a fire, the seat of government was transferred to the Bandeirantes Palace in Morumbi. Later, the building housed the São Paulo State Secretariat for Science, Technology and Economic Development. Júlio Prestes Cultural Center and Júlio Prestes Station, which was remodeled to become the city's largest concert hall, are also located in the area.

== History ==
Campos Elíseos, the first planned allotment in the city of São Paulo, emerged at the end of the 19th century after the establishment of the Sorocabana Railway (1875), the São Paulo Railway (1967) and the Cantareira water supply service (1882). The site used to be an old farmland area known as Campo Redondo. After being acquired by the Baron of Mauá, one of the pioneers of industrialization in Brazil, it was renamed Chácara Mauá. In 1878, the land was bought by Frederico Glette and Victor Nothmann, who created wide streets and large plots. Engineer Hermann von Puttkamer was entrusted with the project to subdivide the farm.

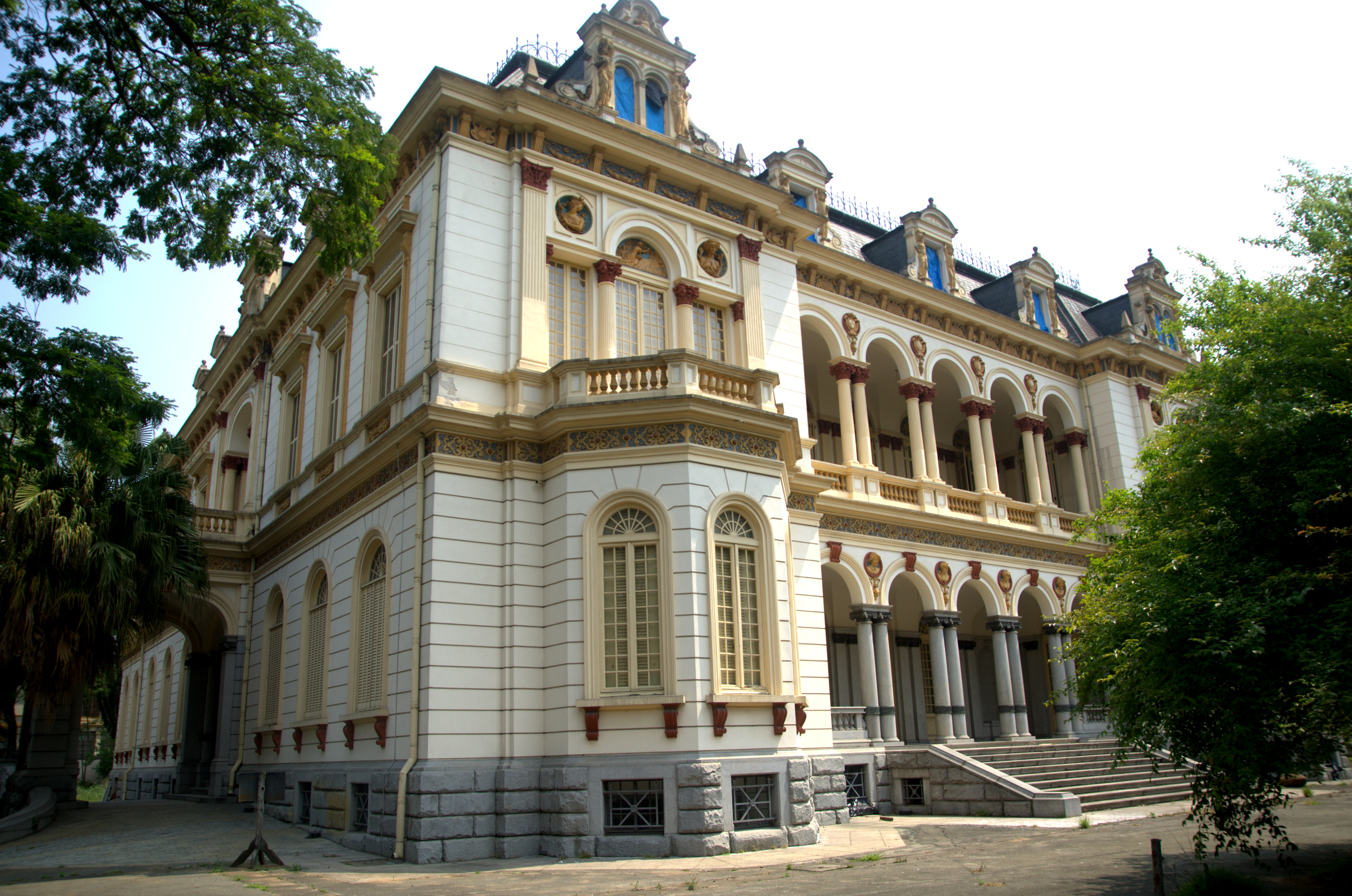
Campos Elíseos Palace on Rio Branco Avenue.

Between 1882 and 1890, the streets of Protestantes, Triunfo, Andradas, Gusmões, Piracicaba, Glette, Nothmann, General Osório and Duque de Caxias were opened. Due to the privileged location, close to the historic center of São Paulo and the Luz Railway Station, the neighborhood became populated by the coffee elite, who began to build their residential palaces in the area. Elias Antonio Pacheco Chaves' family home, known as the Elias Chaves Palace, was inspired by the Château d'Écouen in France. Construction began in 1892 by the German architect Matheus Häusslere under the guidance of the Hamburg architect João Grundt and was completed in 1899 by the architect Cláudio Rossi. When Elias Chaves died, the building was sold and, in 1907, became the residence of the presidents of the Province of São Paulo and was renamed the Campos Elíseos Palace.

In 1885, the Salesian priests of the Confraternity of St. Vincent de Paul built the Shrine of the Sacred Heart of Jesus in Renaissance style. Veridiana Valéria da Silva Prado, owner of Chácara Veridiana Prado, which covered the area between Angélica and Higienópolis avenues and Jaguaribe and Dona Veridiana streets, offered the church the high altar, made of Italian marble. Her land belonged to Martinico Prado's farm, whose headquarters were near the Church of Consolation. In 1900, a level crossing was built under the railway lines, linking Nothmann Lane to Silva Pinto Street, in Bom Retiro. In the same year, the first electric streetcar line in the city of São Paulo was inaugurated, running from Largo São Bento to Barra Funda, via Campos Elíseos. Princesa Isabel Square, located at the confluence of Duque de Caxias and Rio Branco avenues, is also situated in the neighborhood. In the 19th century, the area was famous for hosting horse races. It used to be called Largo do Campo Redondo and Largo dos Guaianazes, until being renamed in 1921.

=== Changes and decline ===
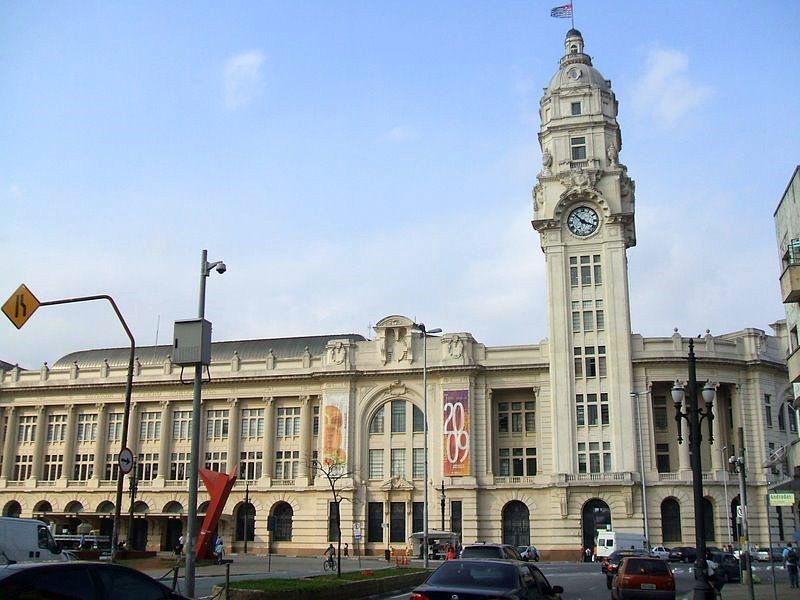
Júlio Prestes Station.

In the 1930s, after the decline of the coffee trade, Campos Elíseos underwent social and economic changes. After the inauguration of the Júlio Prestes Station, built between 1926 and 1938, the movement of people, cabs and cargo increased, which led to the construction of hotels, boarding houses and other services. In 1961, the bus station in Júlio Prestes Square was inaugurated, which made the area lose its residential aspect. In 1977, the bus station was closed and a shopping mall called Fashion Center Luz began operating in the building. Consequently, wealthier families moved to other neighborhoods, such as Higienópolis and Jardim Paulista.

The most significant urban interventions in the neighborhood occurred in the 1940s, with the enlargement of Duque de Caxias and Rio Branco avenues, as part of Mayor Prestes Maia's project. In 1960, the Monument to the Duke of Caxias was installed in Princesa Isabel Square. In 1967, a fire affected the Campos Elíseos Palace, which led to the transfer of the seat of government to the Bandeirantes Palace in Morumbi.

=== Emptying and drug consumption ===
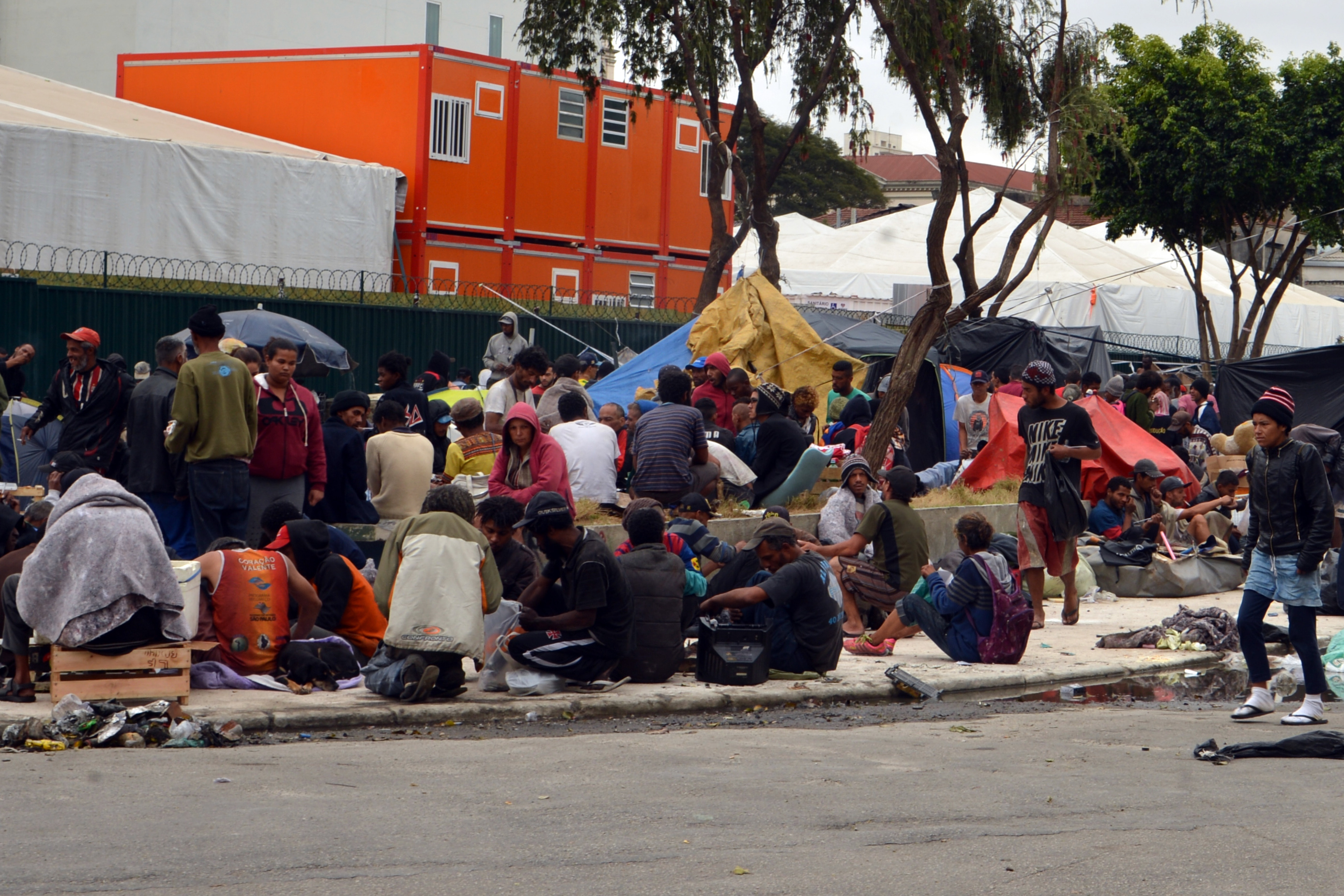
Drug users after dispersal.

After the changes in Campos Elíseos, the majority of the residents moved to other neighborhoods and abandoned their mansions, which led to a large number of neglected properties in the area. In the following years, several buildings became tenements, which are characterized by collective housing where each family lives in one or more rooms and shares hygiene areas. One of the occupations involves Santos Dumont Mansion, built in 1890 and owned by Henrique Santos Dumont, brother of aviator Alberto Santos Dumont. From 1997 to 2001, it housed around 400 families.

In the 1980s, the neighborhood's hotels and shops suddenly emptied out and the abandoned area was occupied by homeless people, especially around the bus station building and the Liceu Coração de Jesus. Low-cost accommodation and a large supply of drugs attracted dealers and users from different places. People who lived in Roosevelt and Sé squares, also located in the city center, migrated to the Campos Elíseos neighborhood searching for narcotics. Cracolândia, where drug users gather, has moved over the years to Julio Prestes, Princesa Isabel and República squares.

In 2012, an operation led by former Mayor Gilberto Kassab demolished dozens of properties that housed lower-class families in the Luz, Santa Ifigênia and Campos Elíseos neighborhoods. In 2022, a police action occurred in Princesa Isabel Square, which multiplied and spread the concentrations of homeless people and drug abusers throughout the city center of São Paulo. A survey carried out by LabCidade identified that most of the people who compose the Cracôlandia had not left the streets of the central part of the city, but instead have begun to occupy streets and sidewalks in smaller within a radius of no more than 750 meters from the square.

In 2015, Porto Seguro S.A., in partnership with the Sé Subprefecture, created Campos Elíseos +Gentil, a project that aims to improve the quality of life of people who live, work, go to or visit the Campos Elíseos neighborhood. The association also provides a service for volunteer workers and local residents interested in participating in the process of transforming the area.

== See also ==
- Central Zone of São Paulo
