= Cidade Limpa =

Law of São Paulo, Brazil, prohibiting outdoor advertising

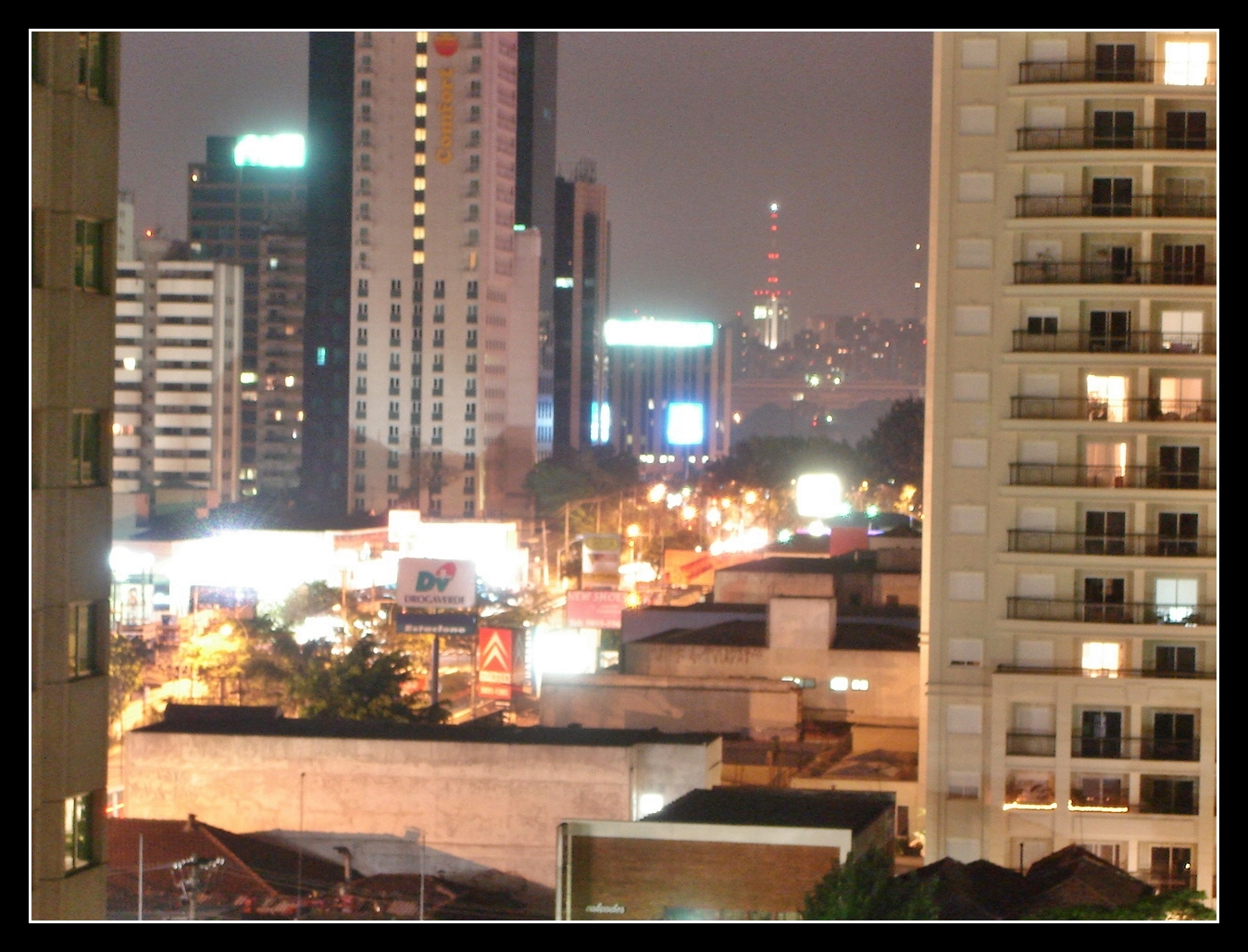
Before Cidade Limpa: Ibirapuera Ave. (November 2005)

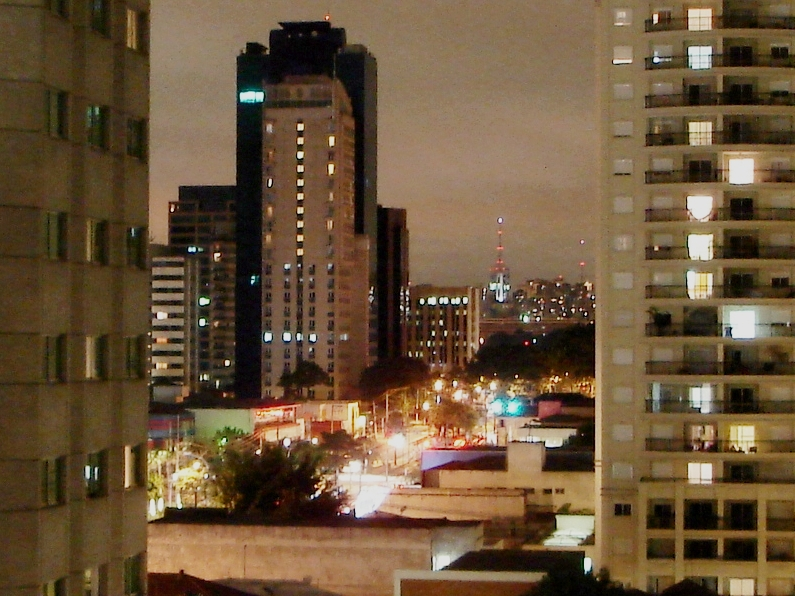
After Cidade Limpa: Ibirapuera Ave. (March 2008)

Lei Cidade Limpa (Portuguese for clean city law) is a law of the city of São Paulo, Brazil, put into law by proclamation in 2006 that prohibits advertising such as outdoor posters. It was proposed by mayor Gilberto Kassab.

15,000 billboards were taken down. Large support from the public was shown for the initiative, in face of private marketing campaigns by certain advertisers for the people to oppose the bans. Following the removal of advertisements, many remarked that they felt like they were in a new city. At the same time, the law created some unexpected social observations.

Vinicius Valvao, a reporter at Folha de S.Paulo, Brazil's largest newspaper, explained in an interview:

São Paulo is a very vertical city. That makes it very frenetic. You could not even realize the architecture of the old buildings, because all the buildings, all the houses were just covered with billboards and logos and propaganda. And there was no criteria. And now it is amazing. They uncovered a lot of problems the city had that we never realized. For example, there are some favelas, which are the shantytowns. I wrote a big story in my newspaper today that in a lot of parts of the city we never realized there was a big shantytown. People were shocked because they never saw that before, just because there were a lot of billboards covering the area. São Paulo is just like New York. It is a very multicultural, globalized city. We have the Japanese neighborhood, we have the Korean neighborhood, we have the Italian neighborhood and in the Korean neighborhood, they have a lot of small manufacturers, these Korean businessmen. They hire illegal labor from Bolivian immigrants. And there was a lot of billboards in front of these manufacturers' shops. And when they uncovered, we could see through the window a lot of Bolivian people like sleeping and working at the same place. They earn money, just enough for food. So it is a big social problem that was uncovered, and the city was shocked by these news.

The implementation of the law was controversial. The advertising industry took it worst. Many of the graffiti images which had brought the city an international reputation for artistic innovation were destroyed and others badly damaged, including the officially approved 680-meter-long mural painted by the grafiteiros Os Gêmeos, Nunca and Nina along the 23 de Maio expressway. At the same time the artists' work was being celebrated in the Street Art exhibition at Tate Modern Gallery in London, with large-scale works by Os Gêmeos and Nunca decorating the Tate Modern's external walls. This international recognition of the significance of the artists' work led to a re-evaluation in São Paulo of the importance of street art and the impact of the law. Following a public debate on the subject of what constituted art a registry of street art in São Paulo meriting protection was established by the city.
