= Santa Cecília (district of São Paulo) =

District of São Paulo, Brazil

Coordinates: 23°31′57″S 46°39′10″W

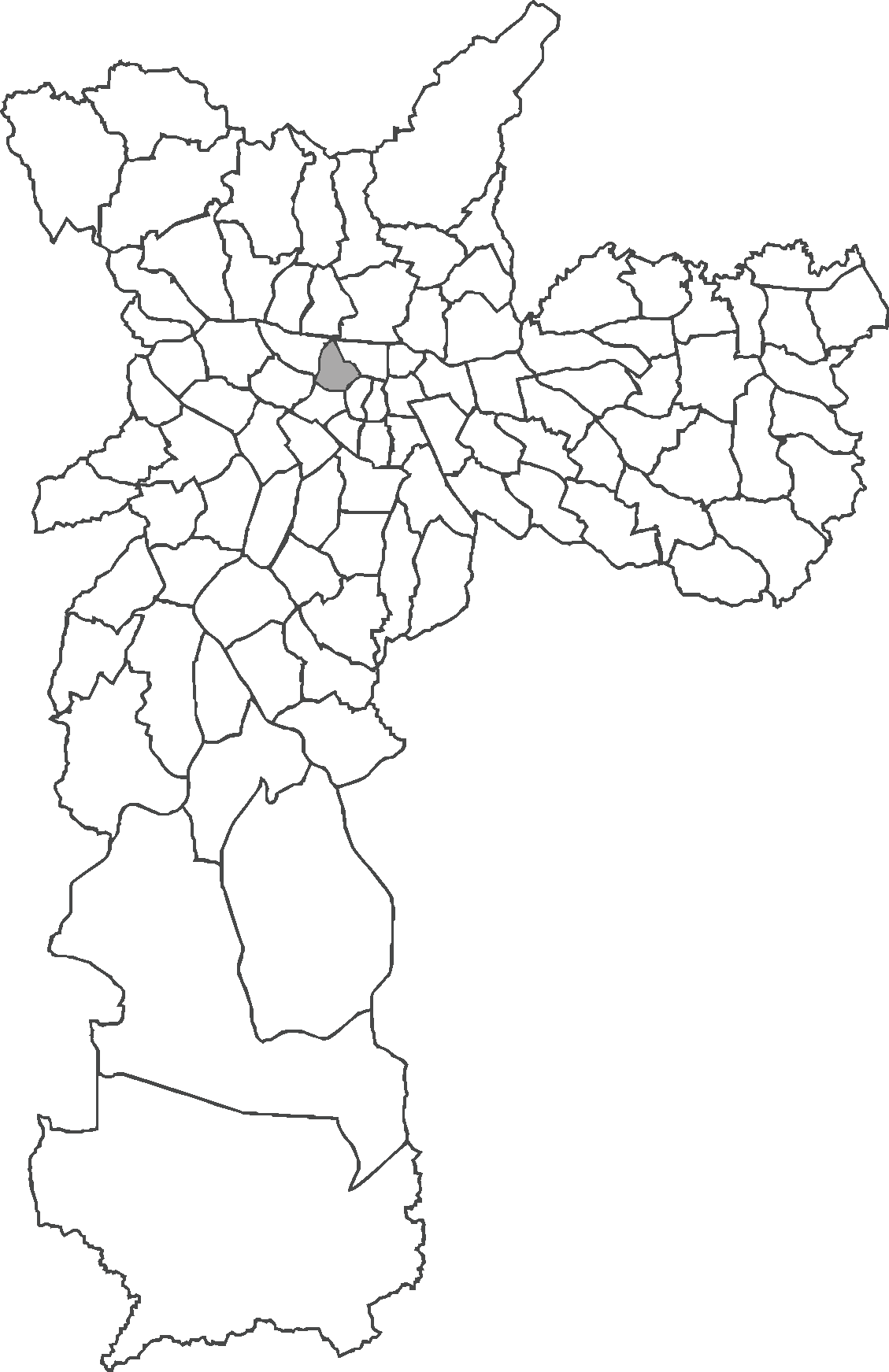
- Location in the city of São Paulo

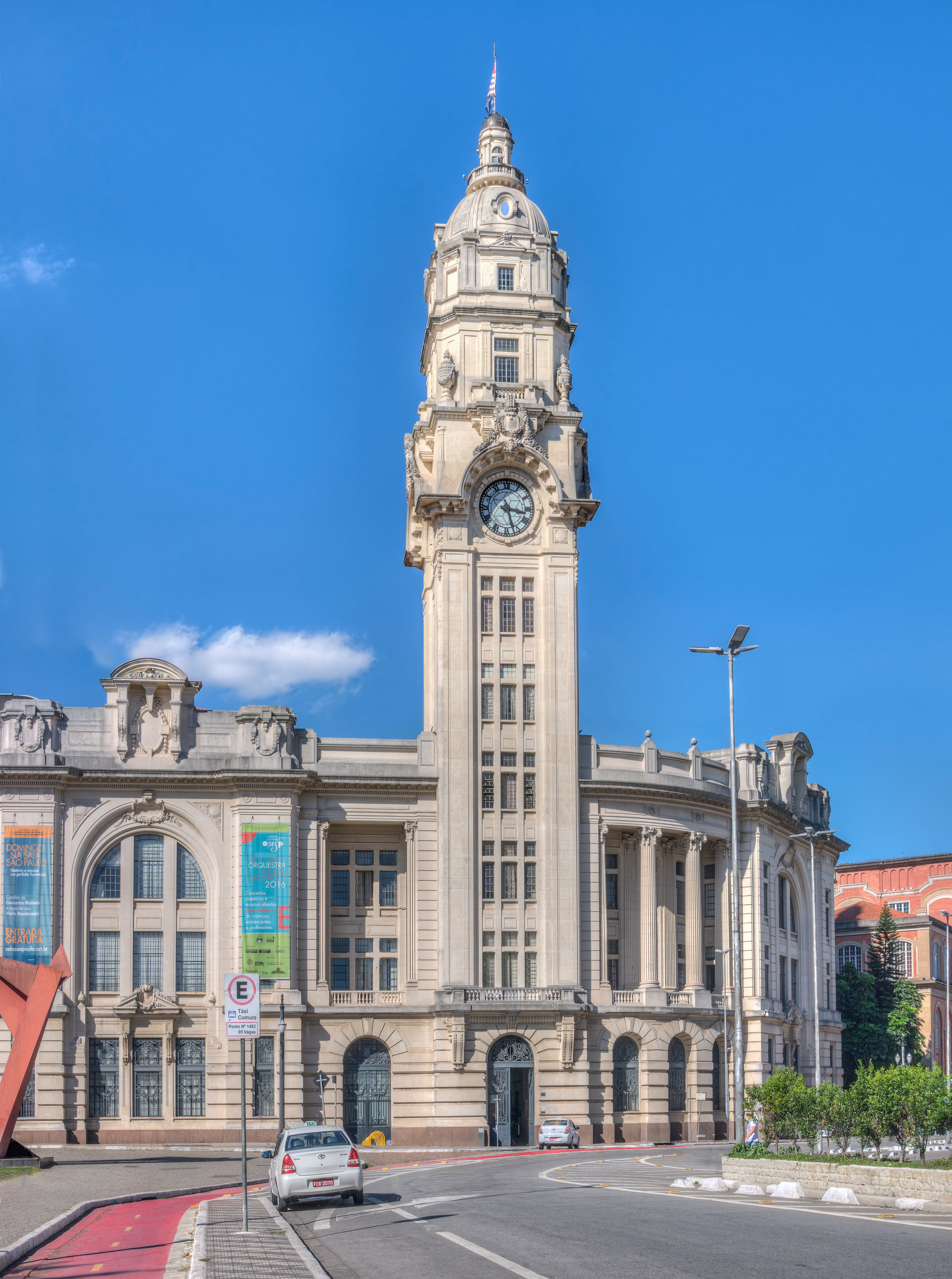
- Country: Brazil
- State: São Paulo
- City: São Paulo

Government
  - Type: Subprefecture
  - Subprefect: Amauri Luiz Pastorello

Area
  - Total: 3.9 km^{2} (1.5 sq mi)

Population (2000)
  - Total: 71,179
  - Density: 18,251/km^{2} (47,270/sq mi)
- HDI: 0.930 –high
- Website: Subprefecture of Sé

Santa Cecília is a district in the city of São Paulo, Brazil.

Santa Cecilia is a district in central region of São Paulo city. It covers the neighbourhoods of Campos Elísios, Santa Cecília, Várzea da Barra Funda (Lower Barra Funda).

Some of the important places and attractions of Santa Cecilia include: Santa Cecilia Subway Station, Maceió Square, Princess Isabel and Julio Prestes Parks/Plazas.

Santa Cecilia was once a wealthy area of São Paulo, but now has many decaying buildings and areas, but recently has seen an increase in development. It contains a major shopping centre.

Santa Cecilia is served by Line 3 (Red) Metro de São Paulo, stations Barra Funda, Maceió and Santa Cecilia. It is also served by Line 8 of CPTM, Júlio Prestes Station.
