= Rivington Street Wall =

Public art project in New York City

Coordinates: 40°43′17.1″N 73°59′35″W

The Rivington Street Wall is a public art project on New York City's Lower East Side that has existed since 2014. This wall, located on Rivington Street between Bowery and Chrystie Street adjacent to the On Stellar Rays gallery, began as a mural piece by Retna, and now is a revolving door of murals courtesy of Parasol Projects

Besides Retna, other selected artists as Olaf Breuning, Andrew Poneros and Pryce Lee have also been part of the rotation. The artworks change every four or six weeks. Among the most notable was a 2018 project by Eduardo Kobra honoring the 27 Club.
