= Gilberto Kassab =

Brazilian politician (born 1960)

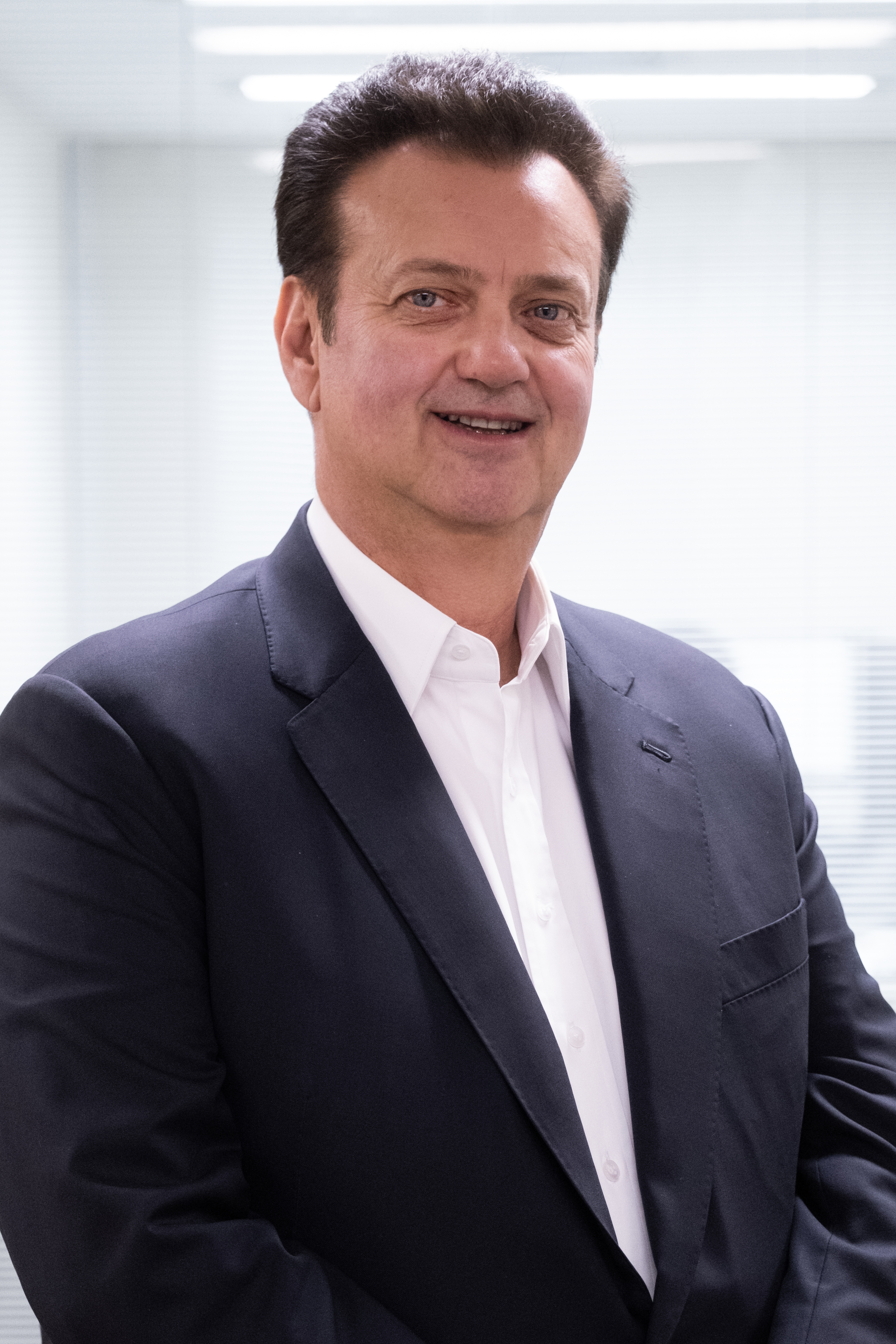
- Kassab in 2023

State Secretary of Government of São Paulo
- In office 1 January 2023 – 25 March 2026
- Governor: Tarcísio de Freitas
- Preceded by: Marcos Penido

Minister of Science, Technology, Innovation and Communications
- In office 12 May 2016 – 31 December 2018
- President: Michel Temer
- Preceded by: Celso Pansera
- Succeeded by: Marcos Pontes

Minister of Cities
- In office 1 January 2015 – 15 April 2016
- President: Dilma Rousseff
- Preceded by: Gilberto Occhi
- Succeeded by: Inês da Silva Magalhães

Mayor of São Paulo
- In office 31 March 2006 – 1 January 2013
- Vice Mayor: Vacant (2006–2008); Alda Marco Antônio (2008)
- Preceded by: José Serra
- Succeeded by: Fernando Haddad

Vice Mayor of São Paulo
- In office 1 January 2005 – 31 March 2006
- Mayor: José Serra
- Preceded by: Hélio Bicudo
- Succeeded by: Alda Marco Antônio

Member of Chamber of Deputies
- In office 1 February 1999 – 31 December 2004
- Constituency: São Paulo

State Deputy of São Paulo
- In office 15 March 1995 – 1 February 1999
- Constituency: At-large

Councillor of São Paulo
- In office 1 January 1993 – 15 March 1995
- Constituency: At-large

Personal details
- Born: 12 August 1960 (age 66) São Paulo, Brazil
- Party: PSD (2011–present)
- Other political affiliations: PL (1989–95); PFL (1995–2007); DEM (2007–11)
- Education: University of São Paulo; University of Brasília
- Website: gilbertokassab.com.br
- Nicknames: Chefe Turco ("Turkish boss"); Kibbeh

Gilberto Kassab (Portuguese pronunciation: [ʒiwˈbɛʁtu kaˈsab(i)]; born 12 August 1960) is a Brazilian politician and former mayor of São Paulo. His term ended in 2012. A civil engineer and economist, one of the most famous Brazilians of Lebanese descent, Kassab took over from José Serra, after Serra decided to run for governor of São Paulo.

He belongs to the Syrian community of São Paulo, and is a member of the Partido Social Democrático (PSD). He is mentioned in 2017 among the beneficiaries of bribes from the multinational JBS.

== Political career ==
- 1993–1994: Councillor of São Paulo
- 1995–1999: State Deputy of São Paulo
- 1999–2004: Federal Deputy (resigned to run as vice mayor of São Paulo alongside José Serra)
- 2005–2006: Vice Mayor of São Paulo
- 2006–2013: Mayor of São Paulo (re-elected on 26 Oct 2008 for a four-year term)

== Administration ==
The advertising industry criticized the city of São Paulo administration for the Cidade Limpa law, which prohibits all forms of external media and visual pollution such as billboards. Ad companies tried to keep the billboards in the streets with injunctions, but the supreme court determined the law to be constitutional. At any rate, support for the initiative from the public continues to be widespread.

Kassab appeared in Morgan Spurlock's 2011 documentary The Greatest Movie Ever Sold.

== 2022 presidential bid ==
In July 2021, Kassab announced that he would support Rodrigo Pacheco in the 2022 presidential election.

== Operation Car Wash ==
The biggest implicated company, Odebrecht kept an entire department to coordinate the payment of bribes to politicians. In Operation Car Wash, officers seized several electronic spreadsheets linking the payments to nicknames. Every corrupt politician received a nickname based on physical characteristics, public trajectory, personal infos, owned cars/boats, origin place or generic preferences. Gilberto Kassab's nickname was 'Chefe Turco' and 'Kibe', the Portuguese translation of 'Turkish Boss' and 'Kibbeh', respectively, alluding to his Middle Eastern ancestry.

== Electoral history ==
Election	Party	Office	Coalition	Running mate	First round		Second round		Result
Election	Party	Office	Coalition	Running mate	Votes	%	Votes	%	Result
1992 São Paulo municipal election	PL	City councillor	Boa Sorte São Paulo (PDS, PTB, PL)	—N/a	13,441	0.25 (#37)	—N/a	—N/a	Elected
1994 São Paulo state election	PL	State deputy	São Paulo de Todos Nós (PMDB, PL, PSD)	—N/a	36,306	0.34 (#44)	—N/a	—N/a	Elected
1998 São Paulo state election	PFL	Federal deputy	Viva São Paulo (PPB, PFL, PL, PSL, PST, PRN)	—N/a	92,866	0.59 (#37)	—N/a	—N/a	Elected
2002 São Paulo state election	PFL	Federal deputy	São Paulo em Boas Mãos (PSDB, PFL, PSD)	—N/a	234,509	1.19 (#9)	—N/a	—N/a	Elected
2004 São Paulo municipal election	PFL	Vice-mayor	Ética e Trabalho (PSDB, PFL, PPS)	José Serra (PSDB)	2,686,396	43.56 (#1)	3,330,179	54.86 (#1)	Elected
2008 São Paulo municipal election	DEM	Mayor	São Paulo no Rumo Certo (DEM, PMDB, PR, PRP, PV, PSC)	Alda Marco Antônio (PMDB)	2,140,423	33.61 (#1)	3,790,558	60.72 (#1)	Elected
2014 São Paulo state election	PSD	Senator	São Paulo quer o Melhor (PMDB, PDT, PSD, PP, PROS)	—N/a	1,128,582	5.89 (#3)	—N/a	—N/a	Lost

Political offices
Preceded by Hélio Bicudo	Vice Mayor of São Paulo; 2005–2006	Vacant Title next held by Alda Marco Antônio
Preceded by José Serra	Mayor of São Paulo; 2006–2013	Succeeded by Fernando Haddad
Preceded by Gilberto Occhi	Minister of Cities; 2015–2016	Succeeded by Inês Magalhães
Preceded by Celso Pandera as Minister of Science, Technology and Innovations	Minister of Science, Technology, Innovations and Communications; 2016–2019	Succeeded by Marcos Pontes
Preceded by André Figueiredo as Minister of Communications	Minister of Science, Technology, Innovations and Communications; 2016–2019	Succeeded by Marcos Pontes
