= Palácio dos Bandeirantes =

Palace in São Paulo, Brazil

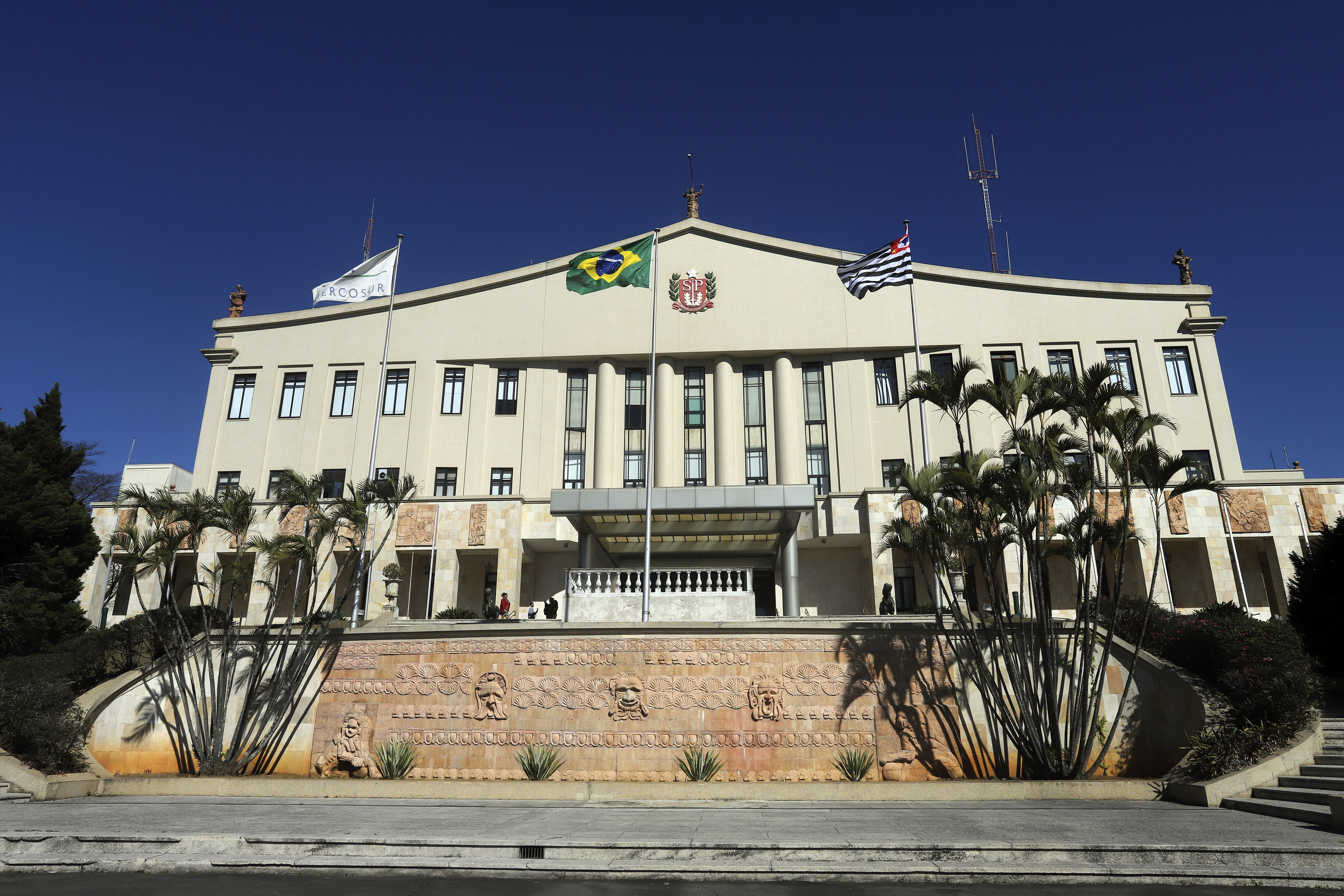

General information
- Location: São Paulo, Brazil
- Coordinates: 23°36′04.71″S 46°42′43.77″W
- Current tenants: São Paulo State governor
- Groundbreaking: 1955
- Inaugurated: 22 April 1965
- Owner: São Paulo State Government

Design and construction
- Architects: Marcello Piacentini (1938 project); Francisco da Nova Monteiro (1958 project)

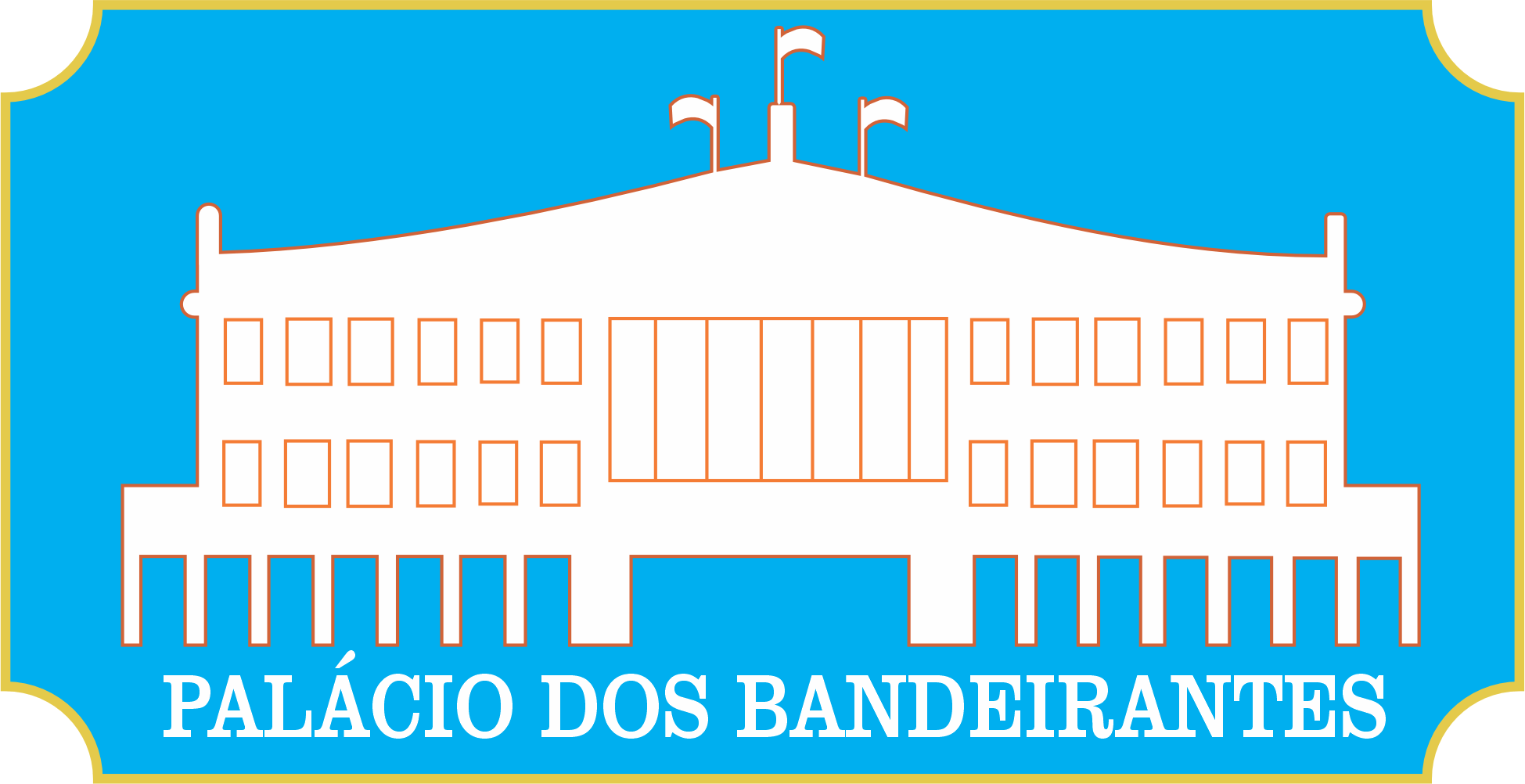
Logo.

Palácio dos Bandeirantes (or Bandeirantes Palace) is a palace in São Paulo, Brazil. It is the seat of the São Paulo state government and the governor's official residence. The palace, located at the Morumbi district, also houses some secretaries and a wide historical and artistic exhibition open to the public.

== History ==
The initial project, designed in 1938 by the Italian architect Marcello Piacentini, presented abstract lines, smooth walls and a wide facade. With the beginning of the works, in 1954, under the direction of the engineer Francisco da Nova Monteiro, it got an Italian style with neoclassical influence The main objective was to house the University Conde Francisco Matarazzo, but due to financial problems, its works were paralyzed.

Expropriated during the administration of governor Adhemar de Barros, the building replaced the Palácio dos Campos Elísios as headquarters of São Paulo executive branch from April 19, 1964, when it was named Palácio dos Bandeirantes, besides becoming the governor's official residence and museum.

It became a cultural center in 1970, under the government of Abreu Sodré, with the initiative of gathering a collection of furniture, paintings and objects. A commission was created with names such as Paulo Mendes de Almeida, Oswald de Andrade, Sílvia Sodré Assunção, Pedro Antonio de Oliveira Neto and Marcelo Ciampolinni, for the acquisition of works of art that currently make up the Artistic-Cultural Collection of the Governmental Palaces
