= Tomás Taveira =

Portuguese architect (born 1938)

- Born: Tomás Cardoso Taveira; November 22, 1937 (age 88); Lisbon, Portugal
- Occupation: Architect
- Buildings: Alfragide Towers; Amoreiras Complex; Estádio José Alvalade and Alvalade XXI; Estádio Municipal de Aveiro; Estádio Dr. Magalhães Pessoa

Tomás Cardoso Taveira (born 22 November 1938) is a Portuguese architect and former university teacher. He has a degree in architecture from the Escola Superior de Belas-Artes de Lisboa (ESBAL), later incorporated into the Technical University of Lisbon (UTL), and owns a post-graduation from the Massachusetts Institute of Technology. Some of his most recognizable works include the Amoreiras Towers in Lisbon, three of the new stadiums for the 2004 UEFA European Football Championship in Portugal and the Allianz Parque stadium in São Paulo, Brazil.

== Works ==
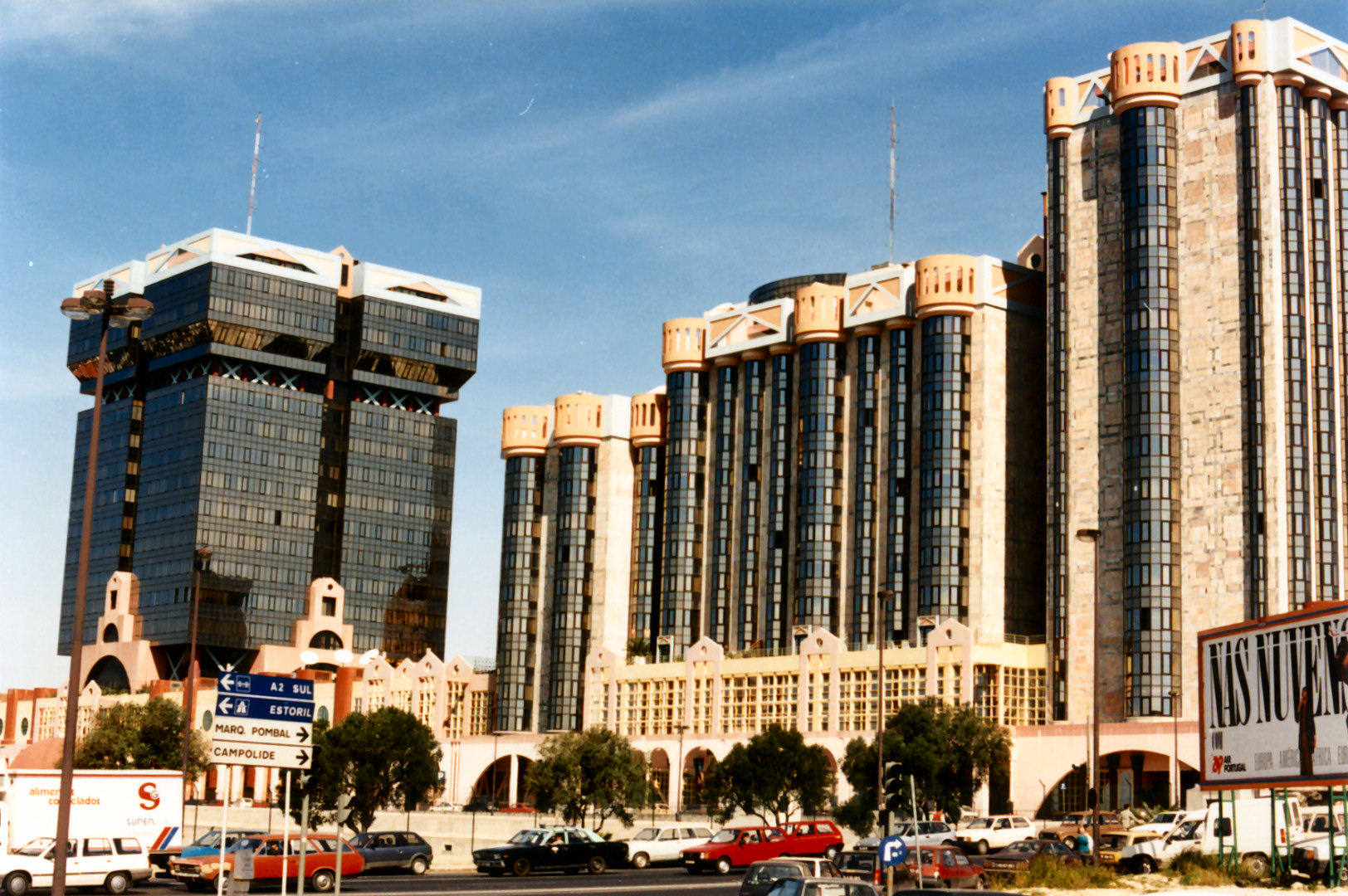
Amoreiras Towers (Torres das Amoreiras), Lisbon - south view.

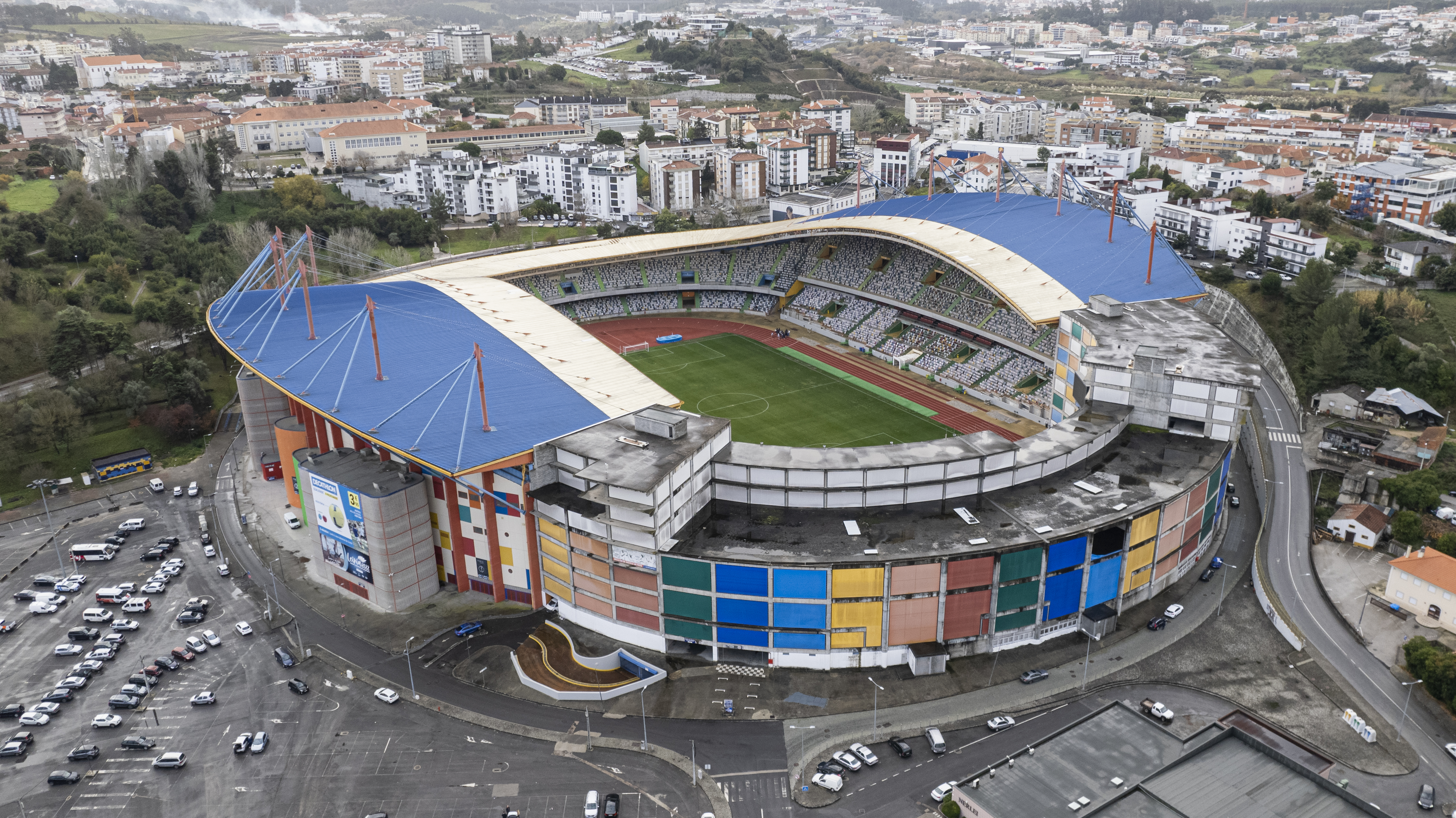
Leiria Stadium, Leiria.

Tomás Taveira's emblematic buildings include:

- Alfragide Towers
- Zona J Housing Complex
- Amoreiras Towers, Lisbon, Portugal
- Arco-Íris Building, Lisbon, Portugal
- BNU building, Av. 5 de Outubro, Lisbon, Portugal
- Aveiro Stadium, Aveiro, Portugal
- Alvalade Stadium, Lisbon, Portugal
- Leiria Stadium, Leiria, Portugal
- New Arena Palestra Itália, São Paulo, Brazil

== Controversies ==
=== Video recordings affair ===
In 1989, he was involved in a celebrity sex tape scandal when some personal recordings he kept in videotapes were fortuitously discovered by his maid; unbeknownst to him, these recordings were duplicated and then used in an extortion attempt against him. Although Taveira initially complied with his former maid's demands, the recordings nevertheless found their way to the Portuguese magazine Semana Ilustrada, which had offered a substantial monetary reward in exchange for the copies. The recordings, happening without the knowledge of the female sexual partners, showed him talking while having consensual sexual intercourse, including rough anal sex, with different women at home and inside his office, among them there were some socialites and some of his architecture students. Since then he gained huge notoriety. The Spanish magazine Interviú also published photos of the recorded scenes which prompted Taveira's lawyer to request court action against the magazine.

The infamous recordings with hardcore sexual content were made available in VHS tapes that spread to the general public and later on to peer-to-peer networks and pornographic video websites which accept user submissions.

Due to the scandal and related negative publicity, Taveira faced serious personal and professional setbacks until the late 1990s. The scandal caused his divorce from his wife Amarílis Taveira.

In 2010, the pornographic film Tavares, o Arquitecto Quebra-Bilhas (Tavares, the Barrel-Breaking Architect) was inspired by the sexual life of Tomás Taveira. Produced by the Hot Gold company, Portuguese pornographic actress Erica Fontes was among the cast members of the film.

=== Bairro do Condado ===
The housing complex projected by Taveira in Marvila, Lisbon was scheduled for partial demolition. The main reason behind this municipal decision was urban and social degeneration caused by uncontrollable drug use and trafficking, increased crime rates and juvenile delinquency. The building complex proved to be quite propitious to such behaviours as it included quite a lot of underused, marginal spaces with difficult possibilities of natural surveillance.

One of the main streets, named The Corridor of Death has been the stage of many gangster homicides and other crimes. The municipality found no solution other than the demolition of some blocks, as it was impossible to regenerate such spaces created by Taveira. This area has been depicted many times in Portuguese film history, including in the film Zona J directed by Leonel Vieira and in the short-film Arena by João Salaviza, which won the Short Film Palme d'Or at Cannes Festival.

=== UTL affair ===
Taveira was a professor at the Faculty of Architecture of the Technical University of Lisbon until 2003, when he was expelled due to a disciplinary process.

=== Estádio José Alvalade ===
In 2021, Sporting CP, headed by club president Frederico Varandas, announced that it would change the colour of the seats in the multicoloured stands of Estádio José Alvalade to green (the main colour of the sports club) and Taveira, as the architect behind the project, couldn't hide his dismay at the club's initiative. He said that the venue, when stripped of fans, "will be less than depressing, but if Sporting thinks it's a good solution...".
