= Erica Fontes =

Portuguese actress

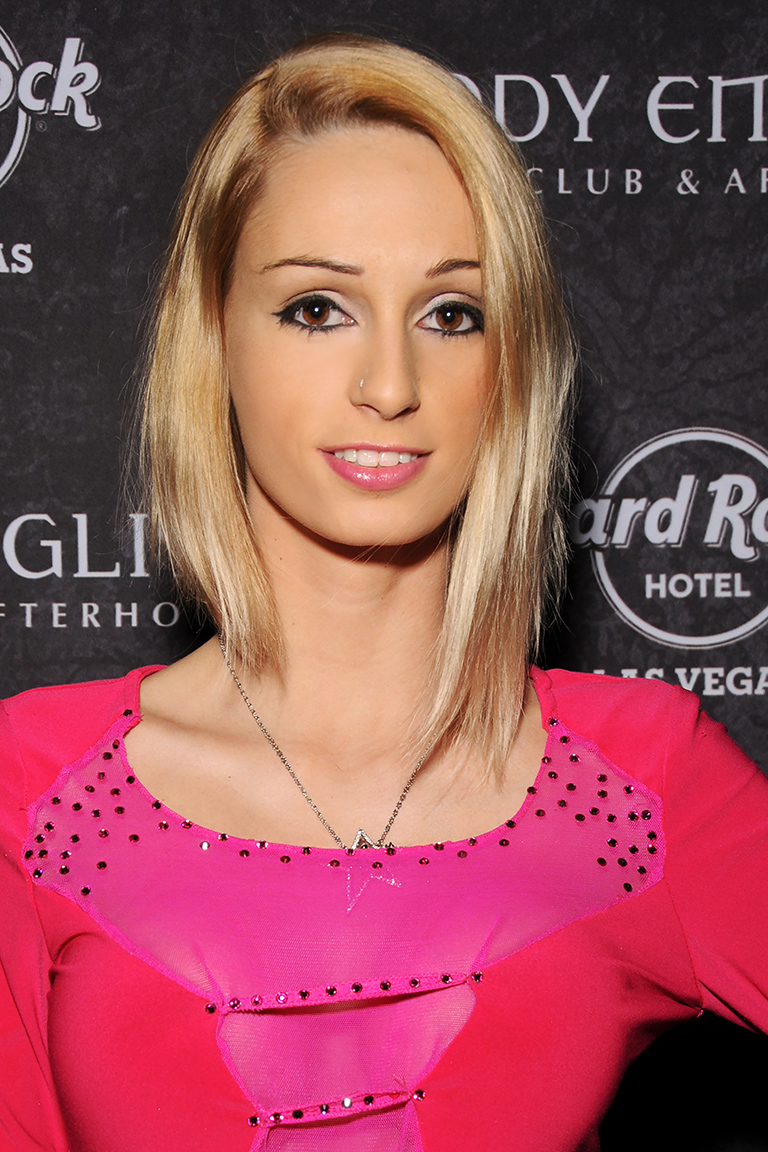
Erica Fontes (2014)

Erica Fontes (born 14 May 1991 in Lisbon), is a Portuguese pornographic actress. In 2013, aged 21, Erica Fontes became the first and only Portuguese woman to win an XBIZ Award in the Foreign Female Performer of the Year category. The fictitious surname Fontes was chosen by her and her partner Ângelo Ferro, pornographic actor and footballer, when on their way to their first porno film shoot, filmed in a dental clinic in Benfica, Lisbon.

In her book "De corpo e alma : dos filmes à vida real. As confissões da estrela de filmes para adultos que conquistou o mundo" ("De Corpo e Alma. From films to real life. The confessions of the adult film star who conquered the world") (Alfragide, Edições Asa, 2013), she confided that "even today I always feel a sense of relief when the scene is over". According to historian António Araújo, the relief felt by Erica at the end of each scene ends up corroborating, at least in part, the chilling passages that the famous and gigantic Meese Report, with more than 1,960 pages, devoted to characterising performers of explicit sexual content: broken family backgrounds, drug use, exploitation on and off the stage, etc. (Attorney General's Commission on Pornography - Final Report, July 1986).

She has participated in many pornographic films, of which the following can be highlighted: Maria's Sexual Diary, her 2009 debut; the comedy Bimbi, The Sex Machine, the world's first 3D porn film; Red Sofa 1 and Red Sofa 3; Erica in the Mansion of Orgies or, finally, Tavares, the Barrel-Breaking Architect, inspired by the life of Tomás Taveira, all produced by the Hot Gold company.

Porn actress Erica Fontes, the "Casa dos Segredos" reality show, the sports club Benfica and the recipe for chocolate cake were the words most searched for by the Portuguese in 2013. In that year in Portugal, Erica Fontes was the most searched celebrity, ahead of US "socialite" Kim Kardashian and beating Portuguese footballer Cristiano Ronaldo into third place.
