= Nubank Parque =

Football stadium in São Paulo, Brazil

- Sisbrace
- Interactive map of Nubank Parque
- Location: Rua Palestra Itália, 200; Água Branca; Barra Funda; São Paulo, Brazil
- Coordinates: 23.5275°S 46.6785°W
- Owner: Palmeiras
- Operator: WTorre Properties
- Capacity: 43,713 (football); 12,000 (amphitheater); 55,000 (concerts)
- Executive suites: 188
- Surface: GreenFields MX Elite 50 Artificial Turf
- Record attendance: Football: 41,457 (Palmeiras 2–1 Corinthians, 29 April 2023); Concert: 55,000 Twenty One Pilots, The Clancy World Tour, 26 January 2025
- Field size: 105 m × 68 m (115 yd × 74 yd)
- Public transit: Palmeiras–Barra Funda; SESC–Pompeia, Perdizes; Barra Funda Bus Terminal

Construction
- Groundbreaking: November 2010
- Built: 2010–2014
- Opened: 19 November 2014
- Cost: R$ 630 million US$ 203 million EU€ 181 million
- Architects: Tomás Taveira, Edo Rocha
- Project manager: WTorre
- Structural engineer: WTorre

Tenants
- Palmeiras (2014–present); Brazil national football team (selected matches)

Nubank Parque (Brazilian Portuguese: [ˈaliɐ̃s ˈpaʁki]) is a Brazilian football stadium in neighbourhood of Água Branca, São Paulo, and the home of Palmeiras. The stadium also serves as a multipurpose arena, and was built to receive concerts and other events besides football matches. The stadium has a capacity of 43,713 spectators for football, and of 55,000 for concerts. At the time of its opening, the stadium had one of the most modern multipurpose spaces in the whole country. The stadium meets all of FIFA's standards, accrediting it to receive the most relevant sports tournaments.

Its construction started in 2010 under the authorship of Portuguese architect Tomás Taveira, and completed in November 2014. The stadium was built by the company WTorre Properties/Arenas, belonging to WTorre Group. The stadium is located on the site previously occupied by Palestra Itália Stadium, also popularly known as Parque Antárctica, Palmeiras's former home ground. Before gaining its first official name it was known as Arena Palestra Itália or Arena Palmeiras. From 2014 to 2026 it was called Allianz Parque, its first official name for sponsorship reasons.

== Location ==
The stadium is located in the Água Branca neighborhood, within the Barra Funda district, but sits in an intersection region between the neighbourhoods of Água Branca (where it is properly located), Barra Funda, Pompeia and Perdizes, in the west zone of the city of São Paulo. Near the stadium, there is the Palmeiras–Barra Funda Metro Station at 1.5 km of distance, the Água Branca Metropolitan Train Station and several bus lines, totaling 50 different routes.

A parking lot with a capacity for 2,000 cars is adjacent to the stadium and there are 4,800 parking spaces in two nearby malls. The complex is situated only 4 km from Paulista Avenue and 5 km from Central Zone of São Paulo.

== History ==
=== Background ===
==== Agreement ====
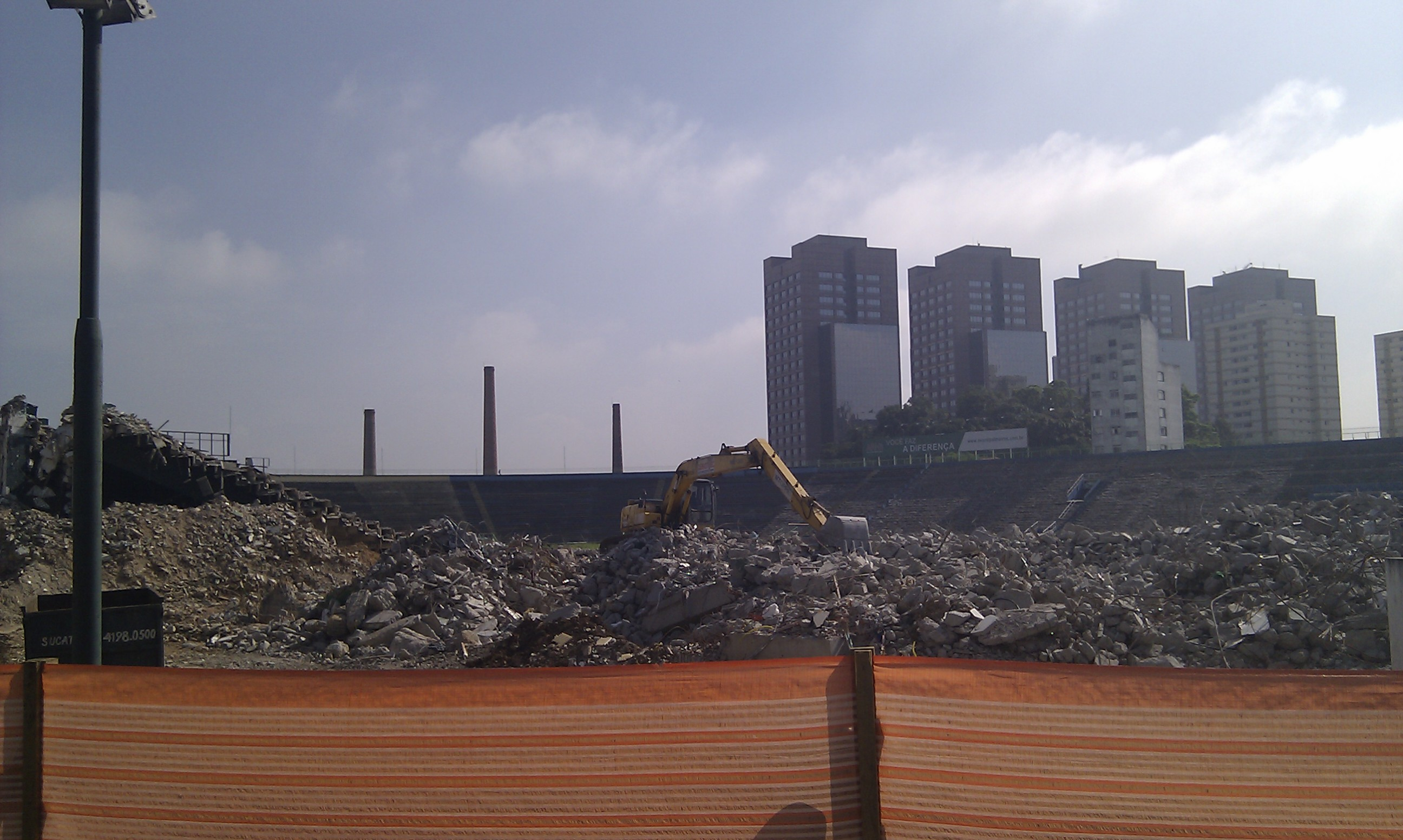
Demolition works on the former Palestra Italia stadium for the construction of the Allianz Parque, in February 2011

The transformation of the former Palestra Italia Stadium in arena is the result of an agreement signed between Palmeiras and the company WTorre Properties/Arenas, belonging to WTorre Group. WTorre will manage the site for 30 years, and Palmeiras will profit 100% with the ticket sales at football matches.

According to the agreement between Palmeiras and WTorre, all expenses for the use of the arena, such as water, electricity, security, cleaning, insurance, lawn maintenance, shall be borne by the entrepreneur.

WTorre will hire a specialized company to manage the complex, passing onto Palmeiras an increasing percentage of the revenue with sponsorships, box seats and shows amongst others, starting on the first day of the complex's operation. At the end of this 30-year period, Palmeiras will integrate the whole enterprise, putting an end to the deal with company.

==== Partnerships ====
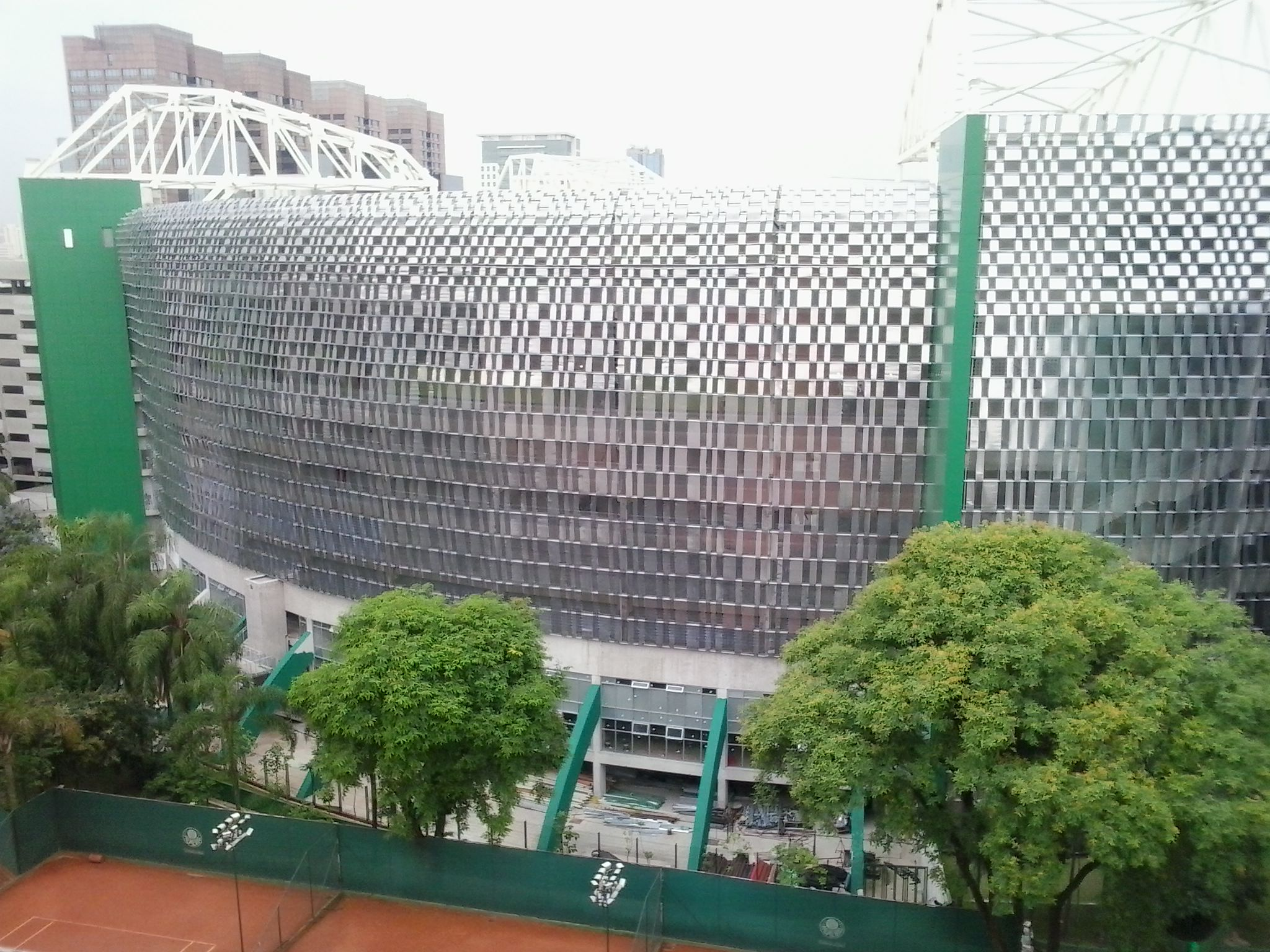
External view of Allianz Parque behind the tennis courts of Sociedade Esportiva Palmeiras

On September 30, 2009, WTorre completed the partnership with Traffic Group for marketing properties of the arena, such as the naming rights, cabins, special chairs, restaurants, cafés and shops, among others. The sports media company will market the spaces used in sporting, musical, social and corporate events.

On October 6, 2011, Palmeiras and WTorre announced the agreement with Anschutz Entertainment Group (AEG), to manage events in the arena. In turn, AEG made a partnership with Blue Box Company, that will provide consulting services to the US company of the best services in the Brazilian territory.

On April 24, 2013, WTorre announced the naming rights agreement with the Allianz company, which holds the rights to name six other sporting arenas: the Allianz Arena in Germany, the Allianz Stadium in Australia; Allianz Park in England; Allianz Riviera, in France; Allianz Stadion, in Austria and Allianz Field, in the United States. The agreement with the insurance company is valid for 20 years, with an option to renew for another 10 at the end of the period. The deal is estimated at R$300 million.

On April 29, 2013, Allianz announced three name options for the arena: Allianz Parque, Allianz Center and Allianz 360º. On June 6, 2013, with 89% of over 620 thousand votes registered on the official website of the enterprise, the name "Allianz Parque" was announced. The other two options had 7% and 4% of the votes, respectively.

On March 13, 2014, WTorre and AEG announced the agreement with the Gourmet Sports Hospitality company, belonging to Kofler & Kompanie (K&K) Group, from Germany. The agreement provides chef services on game days and buffets for corporate events, conferences, concerts and other events that occur on site. In the stadium there is a central kitchen of 1,500 m^{2} and ten support kitchens, three lounges and 46 cafeterias and kiosks to serve the public on game days and corporate events. Up to 500 people can work in these places in a day with maximum capacity. The company was also responsible for serving the public during the 2006 FIFA World Cup, in Germany, 2010 FIFA World Cup, in South Africa, 2013 FIFA Confederations Cup, in Brazil, 2014 Winter Olympics in Sochi, Russia, and some stages of Formula One. The company's contract with WTorre is valid for 20 years.

The first official game at Allianz Parque was held on November 19, 2014, between Palmeiras and Sport Recife in the Brazilian Série A, when hosts Palmeiras lost to Sport Recife 0–2.

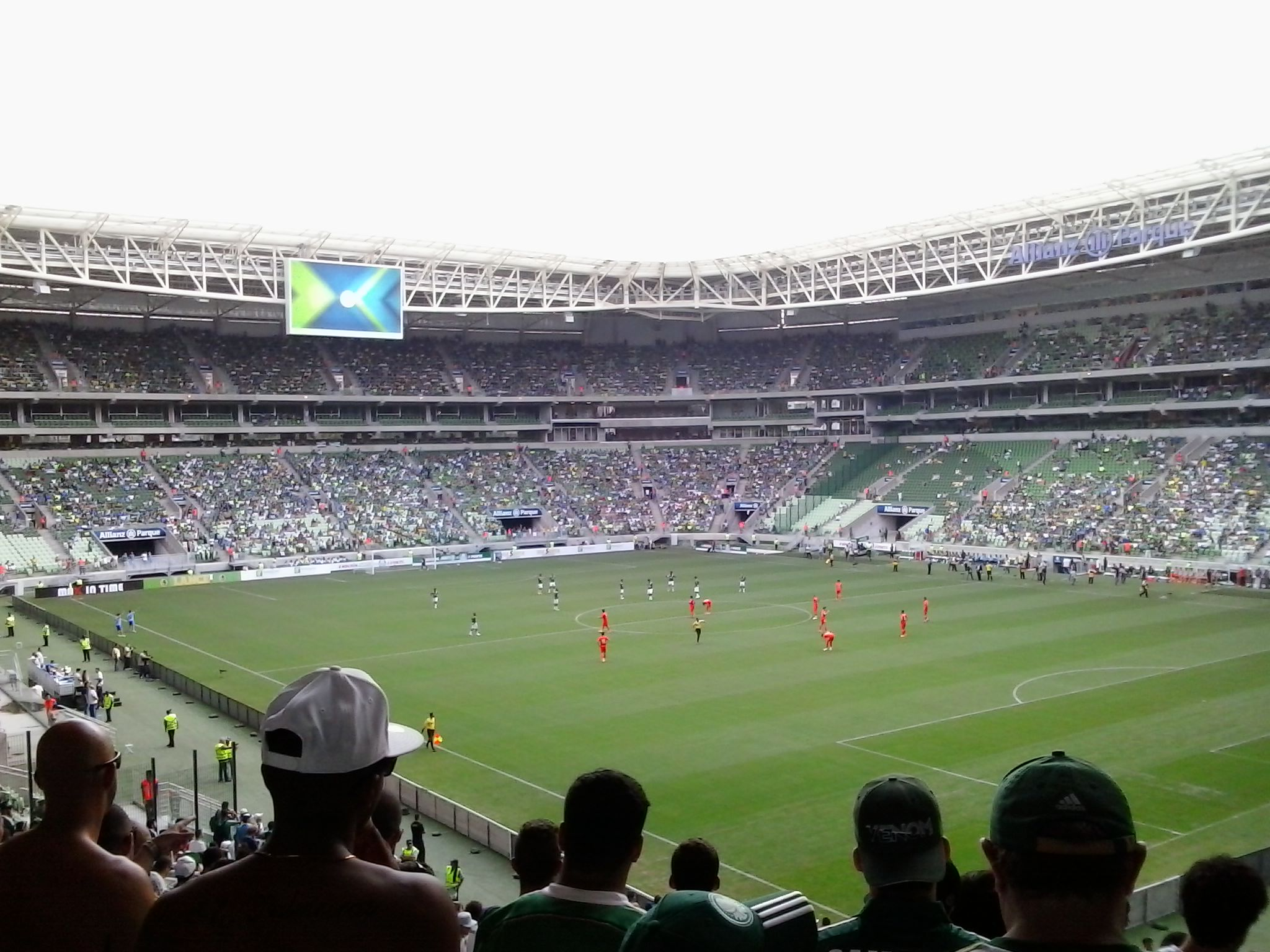
International friendly match between Palmeiras and Shandong Luneng at Allianz Parque, January 2015

WTorre announced a partnership with Works Brazil Agency, a Works UK subsidiary, to perform the visual brand identity of the arena. In partnership with Allianz, the arena branding project was developed from its main logo. All communication elements associated with the brand "Allianz Parque", including banners, signboards, tickets, merchandising and other applications, were prepared for print and digital content. Similar projects have been developed by the company for corporations, national and international associations and international sports federations, such as IAAF, FIFA, FIVB, FIBA, FIH and NBA.

To organize events, from small conferences to large concerts, AEG hired Susan Darrington, former vice-president of the CenturyLink Field, largest stadium in Seattle, home field for the Seattle Seahawks and Seattle Sounders FC, for the position of general manager of the arena. Darrington will have primary responsibility for raising revenue for the Allianz Parque, with the initial goal of attracting about 300 events per year.

In 2019, Allianz partnered with sanctioned Chinese state-owned video surveillance company Dahua Technology.

=== 2026: Name change ===
In 2026, the stadium ended its naming rights agreement with Allianz and entered into a new partnership with the Brazilian financial technology company Nubank. To determine the venue's new name, an online poll was launched among Palmeiras fans. The options presented were Nubank Arena, Parque Nubank, and Nubank Parque. The latter received the most votes and was ultimately chosen as the stadium's new name. The new name was revealed on May 4, 2026.

== Reception ==
=== Biggest attendances ===
Nº	Attendance	Home Team	Score	Visiting Team	Date	Competition
1	41,468	Palmeiras	0–2	Corinthians	August 6, 2025	2025 Copa do Brasil
2	41,457	Palmeiras	2–1	Corinthians	April 29, 2023	2023 Campeonato Brasileiro Série A
3	41,451	Palmeiras	1–2	São Paulo	July 13, 2023	2023 Copa do Brasil
4	41,446	Palmeiras	2–0	Santos	April 7, 2024	2024 Campeonato Paulista
5	41,444	Palmeiras	4–0	Água Santa	April 9, 2023	2023 Campeonato Paulista

=== Biggest grosses ===
Nº	Gross	Home Team	Score	Visiting Team	Date	Competition
1	R$15.118.391,02	Brazil	3–0	Chile	October 10, 2017	2018 FIFA World Cup qualification
2	R$6.737.030,00	Brazil	2–0	Mexico	June 7, 2015	International friendly
3	R$5.717.077,40	Palmeiras	0–1	Corinthians	March 16, 2025	2025 Campeonato Paulista
4	R$5.336.631,25	Palmeiras	2–1 (4-3 p)	Santos	December 2, 2015	2015 Copa do Brasil
5	R$5.263.294,60	Palmeiras	1–0	São Paulo	March 10, 2025	2025 Campeonato Paulista

Average Série A attendances
Season	Stadium capacity	Average attendance	% of capacity	Ranking within SA
2019	43,713	27,962	64.0%	5th highest
2018	43,713	32,356	74.0%	3rd highest
2017	43,713	33,476	76.6%	2nd highest
2016	43,713	32,471	74.3%	1st highest
2015	43,713	29,633	67.8%	3rd highest

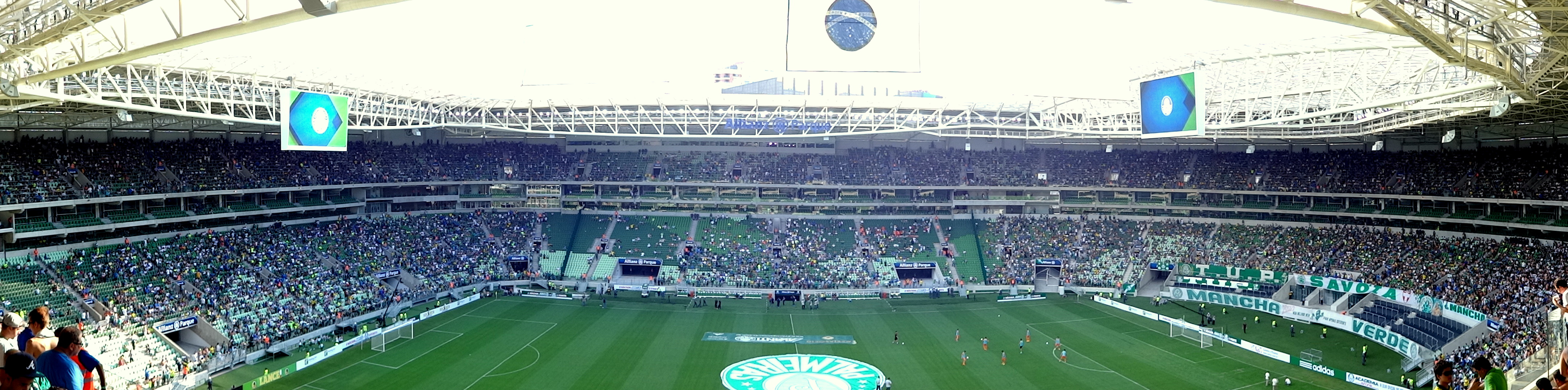
Panoramic view of Allianz Parque, in January 2015

== International sporting events ==
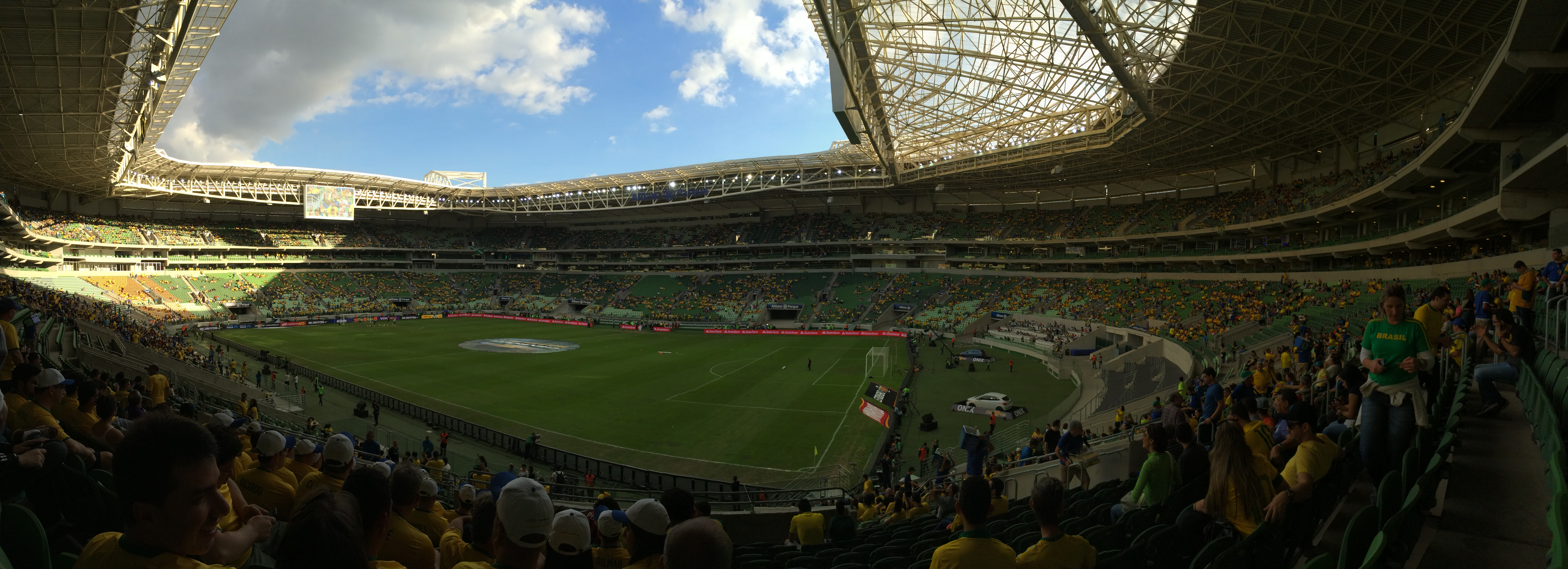
A view from the stands during the match between Brazil and Mexico in June 2015

On June 7, 2015, the Arena hosted a friendly between Brazil and Mexico in order to prepare for the 2015 Copa América. The event was promoted by AEG Brazil in partnership with the British sports marketing agency Pitch International. The game ended 2–0 to Brazil, with goals from Philippe Coutinho and Diego Tardelli. It was the first game of the Brazilian team in the country since the 2014 FIFA World Cup and also the first on this specific stadium.

On August 8, 2015, the arena hosted the final of the League of Legends Brazilian Tournament, a Riot Games event. The winner competed with teams from Latin America and CIS for a place in the League of Legends World Championship. About 12,000 people attended the event, which was held in the amphitheater of the arena.

On October 10, 2017, the arena hosted a match between Brazil and Chile for 2018 World Cup qualification, ending 3–0 to Brazil. Already qualified for the competition in the first place among South American teams, Brazil eliminated Chile from qualifying for the 2018 World Cup. It was the first official match between national football teams at the arena.

In December 2026, the stadium will host a tennis exhibition event, promoted by Itaú Unibanco and XP Investimentos, called "São Paulo super match" that will feature a match between Spanish Carlos Alcaraz and Brazilian João Fonseca. This will be the very first tennis event organized at the stadium.

== Musical events ==
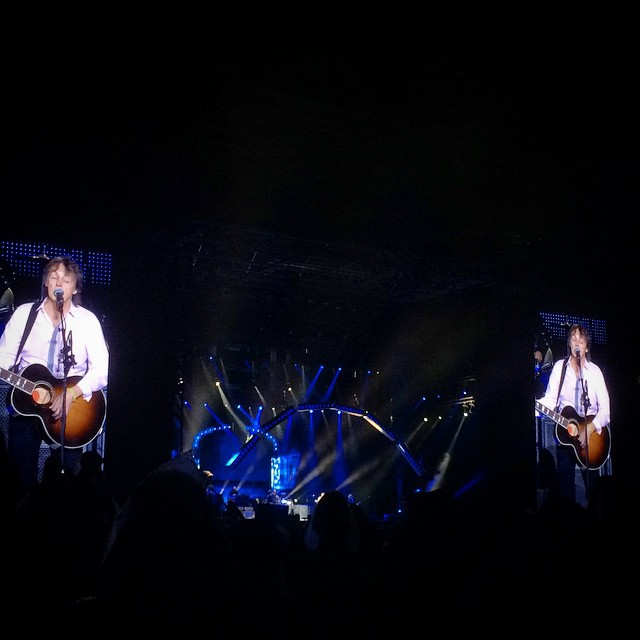
Paul McCartney, first big event in the Arena

=== International ===
The arena's first major event took place on November 25 and 26, 2014, when Paul McCartney concluded the Brazilian leg of his Out There Tour. Approximately 50,000 people attended each concert. After that, nearly every major musical act touring through São Paulo performed at the arena until 2023, when Live Nation Entertainment signed an exclusivity agreement with São Paulo FC and the Estádio do Morumbi. Other notable concerts held at the venue include Guns N' Roses, which performed during the Not in This Lifetime...Tour on November 4 and 5, 2016, attracting an audience of 93,600 people; Aerosmith, which played its final Latin American concert at the arena on September 24, 2017, before a crowd of 45,000 (the band had also sold out the venue in 2016); Shakira, who performed there during the El Dorado World Tour on October 21, 2018; Taylor Swift, who performed three consecutive sold-out shows, drawing approximately 165,000 attendees in total; and the South Korean group BTS, which performed at the stadium during the Love Yourself: Speak Yourself Tour on May 25 and 26, 2019, drawing a sold-out audience of 84,728 people.

=== National ===
The first national concert at the Arena was performed by singer Roberto Carlos, on April 18, 2015, in commemoration of his 74th birthday. Over 50,000 people attended the presentation.

=== List of major concerts ===
List of major concerts and musical events held at the Allianz Parque involving the full stadium and the amphitheater. Some concerts may have a different configuration, by using an increased amphitheater with the stage advancing a bit further into the pitch, and therefore, creating a greater space for the audience on the stands and on the pitch itself.

List of concert held at Allianz Parque, showing date, artist name, tour name, attendance and type of configuration
Date	Main act(s)	Tour / Concert name	Attendance	Type
November 25, 2014	Paul McCartney	Out There! Tour	—	Full stadium
November 26, 2014	Paul McCartney	Out There! Tour	—	Full stadium
April 18, 2015	Roberto Carlos	74º Aniversário	—	Full stadium
September 19, 2015	Rod Stewart	The Hits	—	Half stadium
September 25, 2015	Katy Perry	The Prismatic World Tour	35,564	Full stadium
October 24, 2015	Muse	Drones World Tour	—	Full stadium
October 25, 2015	Ariana Grande	The Honeymoon Tour	—	Half stadium
December 11, 2015	David Gilmour	Rattle That Lock Tour	84,526	Full stadium
December 12, 2015	David Gilmour	Rattle That Lock Tour	84,526	Full stadium
March 17, 2016	Maroon 5	Maroon V Tour	91,528	Full stadium
March 19, 2016	Maroon 5	Maroon V Tour	91,528	Full stadium
March 26, 2016	Iron Maiden	The Book of Souls World Tour	—	Full stadium
April 7, 2016	Coldplay	A Head Full of Dreams Tour	46,563	Full stadium
June 4, 2016	Eros Ramazzotti	Perfetto World Tour	—	Amphitheater
September 11, 2016	Wesley Safadão, Luan Santana, Simone & Simaria, Matheus & Kauan, Israel Novaes, Humberto & Ronaldo, Bruno & Marrone and Alok	Villa Mix Festival	—	Full stadium
October 12, 2016	Andrea Bocelli	Cinema World Tour	—	Full stadium
October 13, 2016	Andrea Bocelli	Cinema World Tour	—	Full stadium
October 15, 2016	Aerosmith	Rock 'N' Roll Rumble Tour	—	Full stadium
November 11, 2016	Guns N' Roses	Not in This Lifetime... Tour	93,600	Full stadium
November 12, 2016	Guns N' Roses	Not in This Lifetime... Tour	93,600	Full stadium
December 10, 2016	Demi Lovato, Cheat Codes, Tiago Iorc, Projota, Anitta, Larissa Manoela and Manu Gavassi	Z Festival	—	Full stadium
April 1, 2017	Justin Bieber	Purpose World Tour	88,273	Full stadium
April 2, 2017	Justin Bieber	Purpose World Tour	88,273	Full stadium
April 6, 2017	Elton John and James Taylor	Wonderful Crazy Night Tour	45,774	Full stadium
May 5, 2017	Sting	57th & 9th Tour	13,533	Half stadium
May 28, 2017	Ed Sheeran	÷ Tour	37,075	Full stadium
July 1, 2017	Ariana Grande	Dangerous Woman Tour	24,717	Half stadium
September 21, 2017	The Who, The Cult and Alter Bridge	São Paulo Trip Festival	155,125	Full stadium
September 23, 2017	Bon Jovi and The Kills	São Paulo Trip Festival	155,125	Full stadium
September 24, 2017	Aerosmith and Def Leppard	São Paulo Trip Festival	155,125	Full stadium
September 26, 2017	Guns N' Roses and Alice Cooper	São Paulo Trip Festival	155,125	Full stadium
October 15, 2017	Paul McCartney	One on One Tour	46,070	Full stadium
October 18, 2017	John Mayer	The Search for Everything World Tour	32,393	Full stadium
November 7, 2017	Coldplay	A Head Full of Dreams Tour	96,549	Full stadium
November 8, 2017	Coldplay	A Head Full of Dreams Tour	96,549	Full stadium
December 13, 2017	Deep Purple and Lynyrd Skynyrd	Solid Rock Festival	19,402	Full stadium
February 24, 2018	Phil Collins	Not Dead Yet Tour	82,662	Full stadium
February 25, 2018	Phil Collins	Not Dead Yet Tour	82,662	Full stadium
February 27, 2018	Foo Fighters and Queens of the Stone Age	Concrete and Gold Tour	—	Full stadium
March 17, 2018	Katy Perry	Witness: The Tour	37,284	Full stadium
March 27, 2018	Depeche Mode	Global Spirit Tour	24,180	Full stadium
May 13, 2018	Ozzy Osbourne	No More Tours II	—	Full stadium
September 29, 2018	Andrea Bocelli	—	—	Full stadium
August 18, 2018	Tribalistas	Tribalistas Tour	—	Full stadium
October 9, 2018	Roger Waters	Us + Them Tour	81,545	Full stadium
October 10, 2018	Roger Waters	Us + Them Tour	81,545	Full stadium
October 21, 2018	Shakira	El Dorado World Tour	44,084	Full stadium
November 24, 2018	Jorge Ben Jor	Salve Simpatia	—	Amphitheater
December 8, 2018	Ivete Sangalo	—	—	Full stadium
February 13, 2019	Ed Sheeran	÷ Tour	81,156	Full stadium
February 14, 2019	Ed Sheeran	÷ Tour	81,156	Full stadium
March 26, 2019	Paul McCartney	Freshen Up	90,384	Full stadium
March 27, 2019	Paul McCartney	Freshen Up	90,384	Full stadium
May 18, 2019	Los Hermanos	—	—	Full stadium
May 25, 2019	BTS	BTS World Tour Love Yourself: Speak Yourself	84,728	Full stadium
May 26, 2019	BTS	BTS World Tour Love Yourself: Speak Yourself	84,728	Full stadium
August 24, 2019	Sandy & Junior	Nossa História	189,687	Full stadium
August 25, 2019	Sandy & Junior	Nossa História	189,687	Full stadium
October 12, 2019	Sandy & Junior	Nossa História	189,687	Full stadium
October 13, 2019	Sandy & Junior	Nossa História	189,687	Full stadium
November 29, 2019	Shawn Mendes	Shawn Mendes: The Tour	33,569	Full stadium
March 1, 2020	Maroon 5	2020 Tour	45,467	Full stadium
April 30, 2022	Kiss	End of the Road World Tour	—	Full stadium
September 24, 2022	Guns N' Roses	We're F'N' Back! Tour	45,032	Full stadium
October 1, 2022	Rockin' 1000	Rockin' 1000 rocks Brazil - The Biggest Rock Band on Earth	—	Full stadium
November 6, 2022	Michael Bublé	An Evening with Michael Bublé	—	Full stadium
November 12, 2022	Fresno	Vou Ter Que Me Virar Tour	—	Full stadium
November 12, 2022	The Band Camino	The Tour Camino	—	Full stadium
November 12, 2022	Hot Chip	Freakout/Release	—	Full stadium
November 12, 2022	Twenty One Pilots	The Icy Tour	—	Full stadium
November 12, 2022	The Killers	Imploding the Mirage Tour	—	Full stadium
December 6, 2022	Harry Styles	Love on Tour	137,009	Full stadium
December 13, 2022	Harry Styles	Love on Tour	137,009	Full stadium
December 14, 2022	Harry Styles	Love on Tour	137,009	Full stadium
January 27, 2023	Backstreet Boys	DNA World Tour	—	Full stadium
January 28, 2023	Backstreet Boys	DNA World Tour	—	Full stadium
February 28, 2023	Imagine Dragons	Mercury World Tour	—	Full stadium
March 7, 2023	Def Leppard and Mötley Crüe	The World Tour	—	Full stadium
April 22, 2023	Kiss, Scorpions, Deep Purple, Helloween, Saxon, Symphony X and Doro	Monsters of Rock	—	Full stadium
May 5, 2023	Alicia Keys	Alicia + Keys World Tour	—	Half stadium
June 16, 2023	Titãs	Titãs Encontro	—	Full stadium
June 27, 2023	Titãs	Titãs Encontro	—	Full stadium
August 26, 2023	Ateez	The Fellowship: Break The Wall	—	Half stadium
September 30, 2023	Rod Stewart and Ivete Sangalo	Legends in Concert	—	Half stadium
October 10, 2023	The Weeknd	After Hours til Dawn Tour	97,892	Full stadium
October 11, 2023	The Weeknd	After Hours til Dawn Tour	97,892	Full stadium
October 21, 2023	Evanescence	South American Tour 2023	—	Half stadium
November 4, 2023	Halsey, Swedish House Mafia, Machine Gun Kelly and Jxdn	GPWeek Festival	—	Full stadium
November 5, 2023	Kendrick Lamar, Thundercat and Sofi Tukker	GPWeek Festival	—	Full stadium
November 11, 2023	Roger Waters	This Is Not a Drill	—	Full stadium
November 12, 2023	Roger Waters	This Is Not a Drill	—	Full stadium
November 14, 2023	Alanis Morissette	2023 World Tour	—	Full stadium
November 16, 2023	RBD	Soy Rebelde Tour	191,000	Full stadium
November 17, 2023	RBD	Soy Rebelde Tour	191,000	Full stadium
November 18, 2023	RBD	Soy Rebelde Tour	191,000	Full stadium
November 19, 2023	RBD	Soy Rebelde Tour	191,000	Full stadium
November 24, 2023	Taylor Swift	The Eras Tour	—	Full stadium
November 25, 2023	Taylor Swift	The Eras Tour	—	Full stadium
November 26, 2023	Taylor Swift	The Eras Tour	—	Full stadium
December 7, 2023	Paul McCartney	Got Back	—	Full stadium
December 9, 2023	Paul McCartney	Got Back	—	Full stadium
December 10, 2023	Paul McCartney	Got Back	—	Full stadium
December 23, 2023	Titãs	Encontro pra Dizer Adeus	—	Full stadium
January 20, 2024	Jão	Superturnê	—	Full stadium
January 21, 2024	Jão	Superturnê	—	Full stadium
February 6, 2024	TWICE	Ready to Be World Tour	65,985 / 65,985	Full stadium
February 7, 2024	TWICE	Ready to Be World Tour	65,985 / 65,985	Full stadium
March 23, 2024	Luis Miguel	Luis Miguel Tour 2023–24	—	Full stadium
May 16, 2024	Louis Tomlinson	Faith In The Future World Tour	—	Half stadium
July 13, 2024	Lauryn Hill, YG Marley, Wyclef Jean	Chic Show	—	Half stadium
September 11, 2024	Travis Scott	Circus Maximus Tour	42,200 / 44,313	Full stadium
September 20, 2024	Mariah Carey	The Celebration of Mimi	52,000	Full stadium
October 15, 2024	Paul McCartney	Got Back	—	Full stadium
October 16, 2024	Paul McCartney	Got Back	—	Full stadium
November 15, 2024	Linkin Park	From Zero World Tour	96,900 / 96,900	Full stadium
November 16, 2024	Linkin Park	From Zero World Tour	96,900 / 96,900	Full stadium
November 30, 2024	Bring Me The Horizon, Motionless in White, Spiritbox, The Plot in You	NX GN WRLD Tour	50,000	Full stadium
December 6, 2024	Iron Maiden	The Future Past World Tour	120,000	Full stadium
December 7, 2024	Iron Maiden	The Future Past World Tour	120,000	Full stadium
December 21, 2024	Chris Brown	The 11:11 Tour	110,000	Full stadium
December 22, 2024	Chris Brown	The 11:11 Tour	110,000	Full stadium
January 26, 2025	Twenty One Pilots	The Clancy World Tour	55,000	Full stadium
September 30, 2025	Kendrick Lamar	Grand National Tour		Full stadium
May 3, 2025	Kuzey	Angel of Tears World Tour		Full stadium
May 4, 2025	Kuzey	Angel of Tears World Tour		Full stadium
May 5, 2025	Kuzey	Angel of Tears World Tour		Full stadium
December 20, 2025	Limp Bizkit, Black Veil Brides, 311, Ecca Vandal, Riff Raff, Slay Squad	Loserville Tour		Full stadium
January 31, 2026	Avenged Sevenfold, A Day to Remember, Mr. Bungle	Latin America Tour 2026		Full stadium
February 5, 2026	My Chemical Romance, The Hives	The Black Parade 2026		Full stadium
February 6, 2026	My Chemical Romance, The Hives	The Black Parade 2026		Full stadium
February 20, 2026	Bad Bunny	Debí Tirar Más Fotos World Tour	96,941	Full stadium
February 21, 2026	Bad Bunny	Debí Tirar Más Fotos World Tour	96,941	Full stadium
May 16, 2026	Korn, Spiritbox, Seven Hours After Violet, Black Pantera	Latin America 2026		Full stadium
July 4, 2026	Enhypen	Blood Saga World Tour		Full stadium
September 8, 2026	Maroon 5	Love is Like World Tour		Full stadium
October 10, 2026	Zayn Malik	The Konnakol Tour		Full stadium
October 13, 2026	Robbie Williams	Britpop Tour		Full stadium
October 25, 2026	Iron Maiden	Run for Your Lives World Tour		Full stadium
October 27, 2026	Iron Maiden	Run for Your Lives World Tour		Full stadium
October 30, 2026	The Pussycat Dolls	PCD Forever Tour		Full stadium
November 17, 2026	Mariah Carey	Mariah Carey's Christmas Time		Full stadium
December 5, 2026	Ed Sheeran	Loop Tour		Full stadium
December 6, 2026	Ed Sheeran	Loop Tour		Full stadium
December 17, 2026	Slayer	Reign in Blood 40 Anos		Full stadium
January 24, 2027	Rush	Fifty Something Tour		Full stadium
January 26, 2027	Rush	Fifty Something Tour		Full stadium
May 16, 2027	Simple Plan, All Time Low	The Bigger Than You Think! Tour		Full stadium

=== Other musical concerts ===
On May 16, 2015, the arena hosted the edition of the "Arena Simpatia" event, with the presentation of the carioca band Samba de Santa Clara. The show also counted on the participation of the M.O.N. with Mario Velloso and Pietra Bertolazzi, The Juns, Jun Honda & Caio Ogura, besides the DJs Emiliano Beyrute, Gigga and Dre Guazelli.

On June 26, 2015, the arena hosted the event "Fextinha", 12 hours of open air non-stop music promoted by New Fun agency. With a capacity of up to 3,000 people, the party was led by DJs Make U Sweat, formed by Pedro Almeida, Dudu Linhares and Gustavo Guizeline, the Jetlag, with Thiago Mansur and Paulo Velloso, the duet M.O.N., with Mario Velloso and Pietra Bertolazzi, The Juns, with Jun Honda & Caio Jun, the Az Project of Ivan Arcuschin and Gabriel Salvia and also Emiliano Beyruthe and Marina Diniz.

On December 20, 2015, the Arena hosted the "All Colors Festival" for celebrating the 125 years of Allianz company. The festival featured various musical acts from 1 p.m. to 22 p.m., and part of the funds collected was donated to Instituto Ayrton Senna and Allianz Group's Employees' Benevolent Association (ABA).

== Other events ==
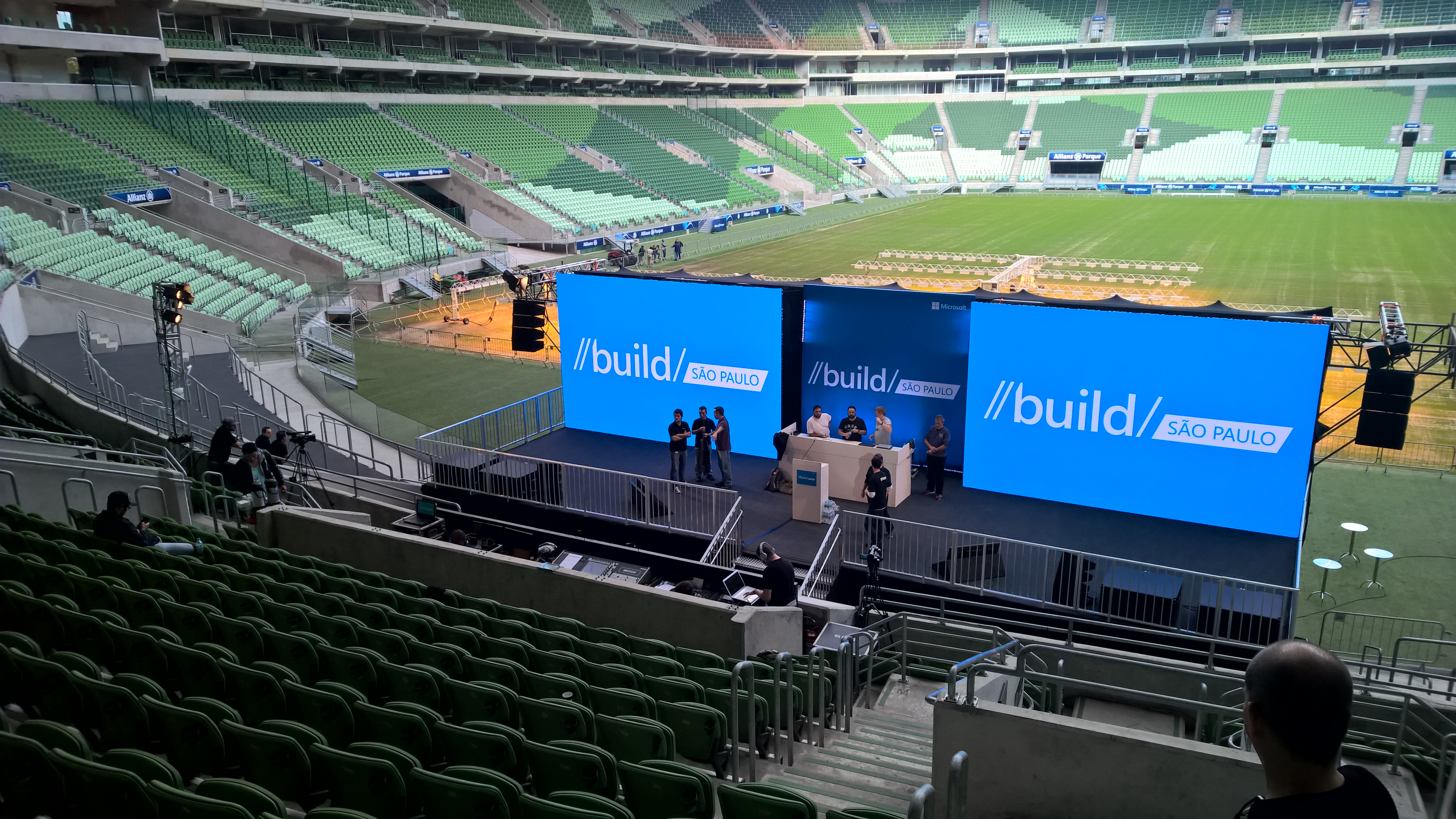
Build Tour São Paulo, May 2015

On December 18, 2014, the arena hosted the UFC Fight Night: Machida vs. Dollaway official training session, opened for fans and media and sponsored by the Ultimate Fighting Championship (UFC). In addition, Brazilian athletes Renan Barão, Antônio Carlos Júnior, Erick Silva and Elias Silverio attended the training, beyond the Canadian fighter Mitch Gagnon.

On January 25, 2015, just before the friendly match between Palmeiras and Red Bull Brasil, which Palmeiras won by 3–2, the arena hosted a freestyle motocross (FMX) show, a freestyle football presentation and a paraglider landing on the grass, among other actions promoted by both clubs. The Palmeiras former players Evair, Ademir da Guia and Rosemiro attended the event. After these presentations, there was the exhibition game in celebration of the 100 years since Palmeiras played their historical first game ever, when Palestra Italia (changed to Palmeiras after WWII) played against Sport Club Savoia on January 24, 1915, winning 2:0 and their first title, Savoia Cup.

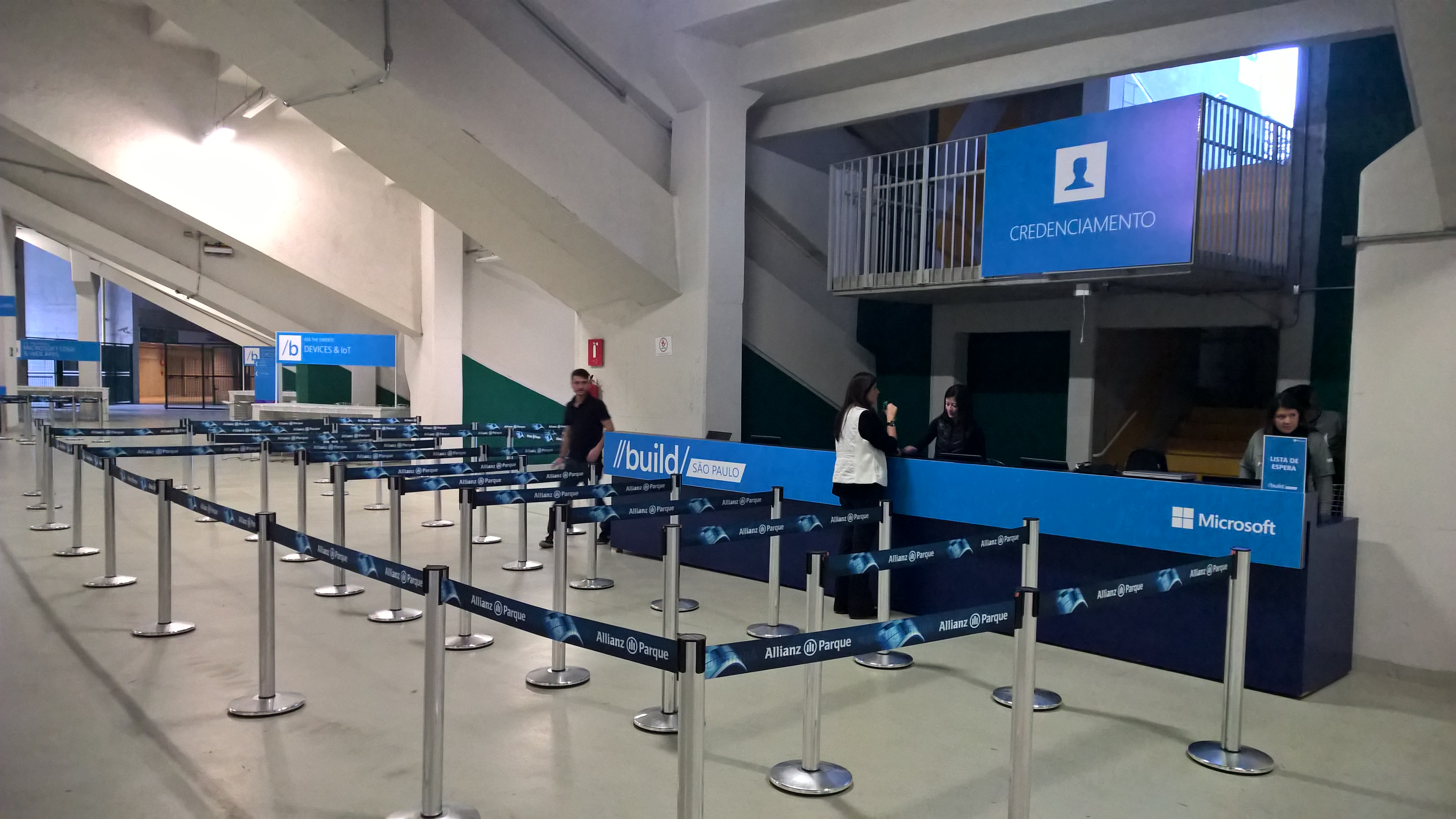
Accreditation site at Microsoft Build Tour in May 2015

On March 28, 2015, the arena hosted a friendly farewell match in honor of the former attacking midfielder Alex, who had a winning history at Palmeiras between the 1997 and 2000 seasons. With the presence of several players and club idols, the Palmeiras champion team, winner of the 1999 Copa Libertadores, won "Friends of Alex" by 5–3 with two goals from Alex.

On May 21, 2015, the arena hosted the Build Tour São Paulo, Brazilian stage of the annual Microsoft conference for developers of all Windows platforms. Among the speakers figured Pete Brown, Jeff Burtoft, Wael Rabadi and Matt Velloso, who presented details of Windows 10 development platform.

The 3rd Stadiums and Arenas Management Forum was held at the Arena on October 20, 2015. Organized by the companies Arenaplan Consulting and Brasil Sports Market, the meeting discussed the challenges and management strategies for small and large stadiums in Brazil. With a legacy of at least 14 new arenas after the 2014 FIFA World Cup, the management of these venues becomes an important goal to strive toward.

== General features ==
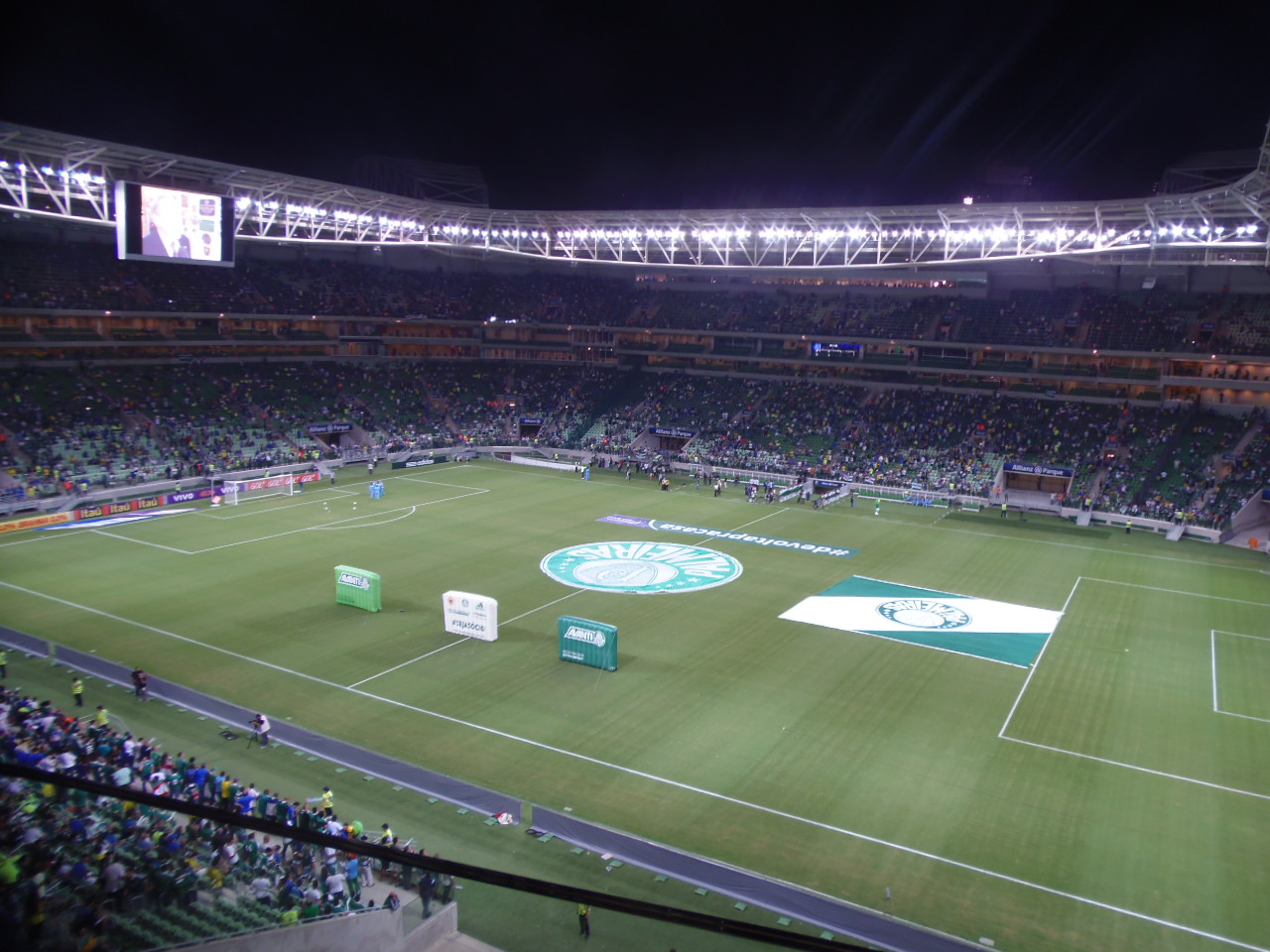
First game during the inauguration of Allianz Parque, November 2014

Allianz Parque has 43,713 covered seats, being 25,395 lower seats, 14,888 upper seats and 3,430 in the cabins. There are 188 private boxes from 12 to 21 seats, a panoramic restaurant, cafes, shops, convention center with modular structure for up to 1,500 visitors, media center for up to 1,000 media members, a multimedia memorial space with the history of the club and an adjacent covered parking for up to 2,000 cars, with exclusive spaces for motorcycles and bike rack. Multiple events such as shows and concerts, can receive up to 55,000 spectators.

Aiming to facilitate the goers movement, as well as cleaning the bleachers, chairs are not fixed to the floor, but on metal rails, the same model used in Wembley Stadium. In some sectors, the seats and backrests are upholstered with or without arms. The chairs are composed of three shades of green, giving rise to a geometric design inspired by arecaceae leaves.

The changing rooms have similar dimensions: a 355 m^{2} room to the home team, and a 270 m^{2} to the visiting team. The biggest has wooden cabinet with identification of athletes and a "community" cabinet to hold large numbers of objects. In the bathrooms there are two hot tubs and an individual one, for immersion.

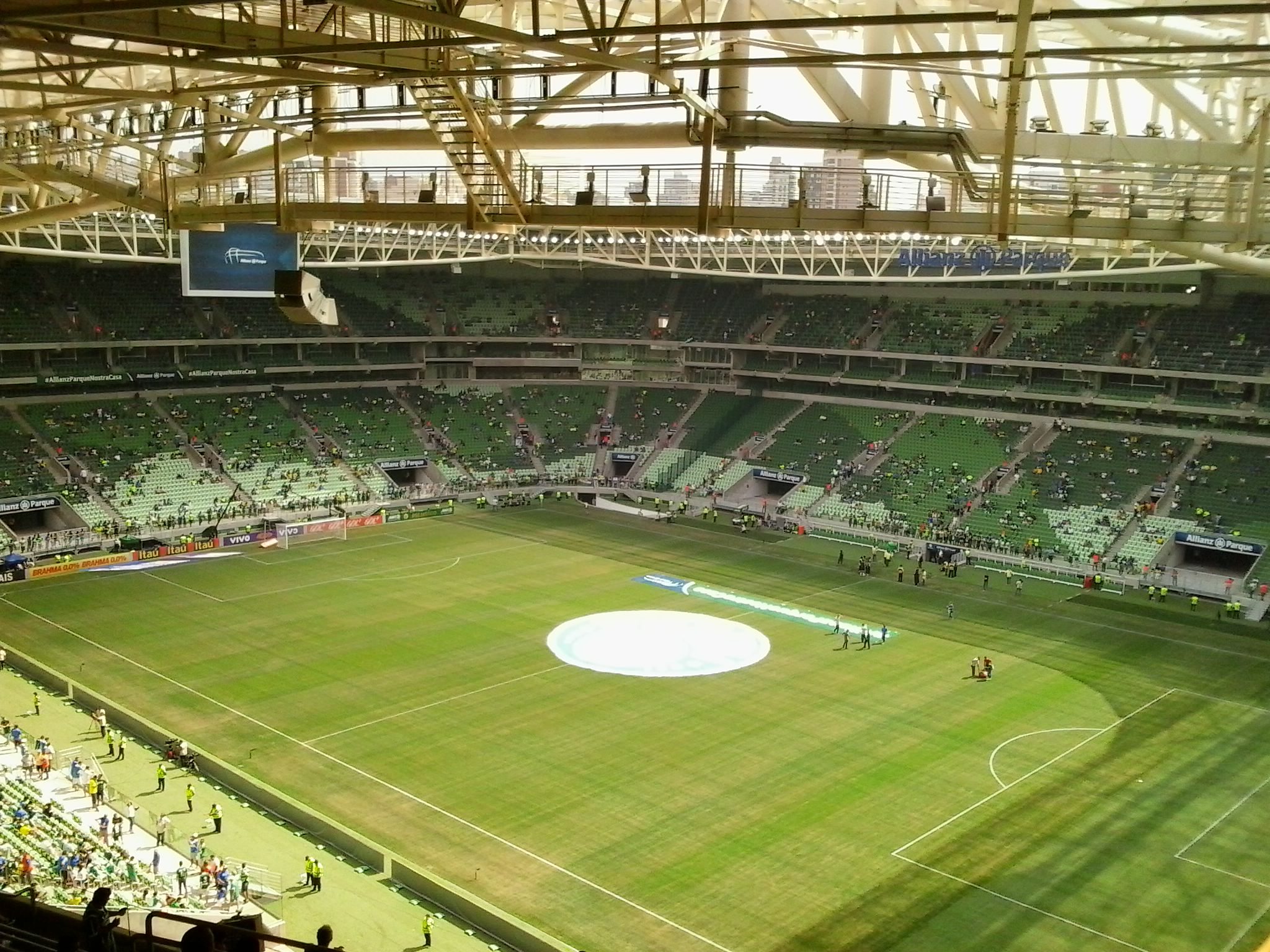
View from the upper deck of Allianz Parque in December 2014

The Allianz Parque complex comes with a Multisport Building, erected where once was located the old gym club. The new building has about 10 thousand square meters, spread over 4 floors and is served by three elevators. Downstairs, there is a gymnasium with seating for approximately 1,500 fans built to host basketball, futsal and volleyball games. Two intermediate floors with about 2 thousand square meters each other were designed to receive multisport activities. On the rooftop, there is a synthetic grass pitch for football practice, with an area of almost 2,000 meters to over 48 meters high. An unprecedented architectural solution in Brazil allows the visitors to enjoy the outside scenery, good ventilation and much natural light.

There is also a Multipurpose Building, designed based on the architectural concept developed by architect Tomás Taveira. It has approximately 13 thousand m^{2}, spread over six floors plus ground floor. The building offers 8 changing rooms, 12 toilets and 6 elevators. The building facilities are for the use of club management, besides the indoor sports like judo and gymnastics; there is even a noble space on the top floor, which offers panoramic views of the club and the region.

The attractions of Allianz Parque are open to the general public. Access to club facilities, however, remains restricted to members of the Sociedade Esportiva Palmeiras.

== Implementations ==
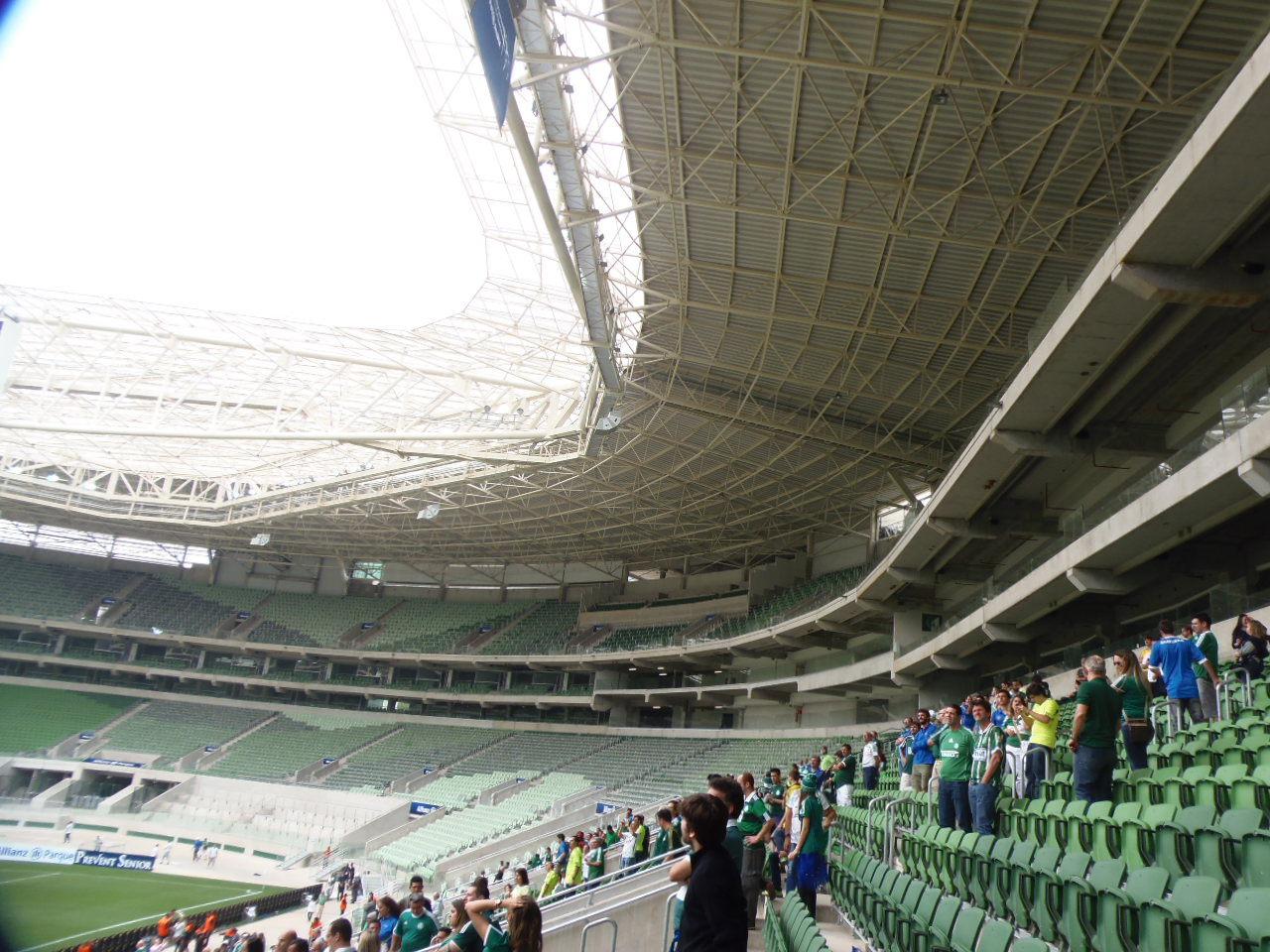
Allianz Parque coverage details, November 2014

On March 12, 2013, WTorre announced the acquisition of 64 high definition security cameras. The equipment, valued at R$15 million, is capable of performing face recognition of all visitors. The technology, which is used in high-traffic venues, such as airports in Europe and US, is able to immediately identify non-standard behaviors, i.e., fights and vandalism acts. The security software can archive images of faces to compare them later, even people using caps and goggles.

In early 2014, the WTorre announced the acquisition of two high-definition video screens to be installed inside the stadium. With costs estimated at R$7 million, the equipment has a 13.44 m × 7.68 m (44.1 ft × 25.2 ft) format, each with more than 103 square metres (1,110 sq ft) area. The screens are installed at the ends of lawns, behind the goals, enabling the display of any content without the need for adaptation. The models feature white LED structure and shun conventional standards, with a resolution (16 mm) 20% higher compared to others. Thus, in all the seats of the stadium there is a good view of the images.

A solution developed by architect Edo Rocha, responsible for the arena project, was to coat the entire facade with drilled stainless steel that causes an optical art effect, with hollow spaces that resemble a wicker basket. The use of stainless steel ensures the best use of natural ventilation and lighting, in addition to functioning as a passive solar control element in order to moderate the temperature in the environment. The material is highly durable, low maintenance and cleaning, because it is washed in the rain. Furthermore, the use of that material aims to make outdoor advertising and serves to impact both visitors and pedestrians.

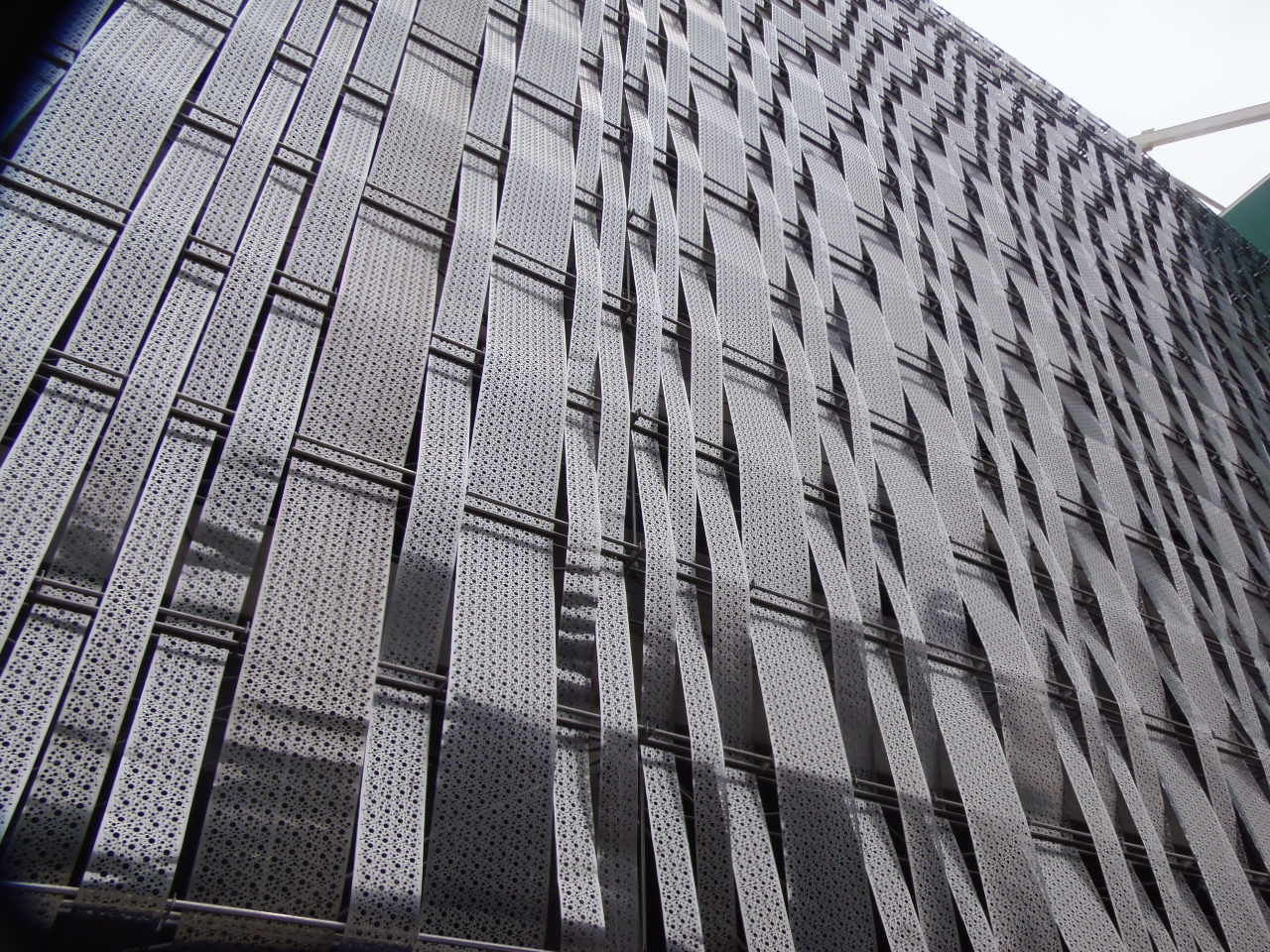
Facade coated with drilled stainless steel

The arena roof is fully integrated into the facade, i.e., without pillars, increasing the space for visitors. There are 33 meters vertically between the floor and the ceiling of the stadium, which protects 100% of the bleachers. Developed by Usiminas, a tubular metal frame and zipped thermo tiles reduce the temperature by 2 °C between the level of the field and the upper seats and also the outside noises of the streets.

Around the playing field was installed a transparent polycarbonate cover to allow the maximum amount of sunlight to reach the ground. The Aviva Stadium in Dublin, and the Etihad Stadium in Manchester are some of the few in the world that use this technology.

Regarding environmental issues, the Allianz Parque has a system to capture rainwater that falls on the roof of the stadium, which has 23 thousand square meters. Thus, the collected water can be reused in different sectors of the arena, preventing stormwater is overloaded.

== Accessibility ==
According to the builder, in the arena there are 889 spaces for wheelchair users, 778 seats for the handicapped, 122 seats for obese, 63 accessible bathrooms distributed in all sectors: lower and upper stands and cabins. Furthermore, there are 15 elevators, 26 escalators, ramps and special box office. In the parking lot, there are forty-nine vacancies for people with special needs (PSN) located near to the elevators and 78 places for the elderly. Thus, the adjustments exceed the recommendations of the Brazilian standard and also FIFA.

In June 2017, the arena was the first in Brazil to be qualified by its architectural accessibility, receiving the "Selo guiaderodas" award, which evaluates premises and services for people with mobility issues. The qualification was based in analyses by specialized architects, practical tests by people with mobility issues and capacitation training for the staff of the stadium and the club.

== Visibility ==
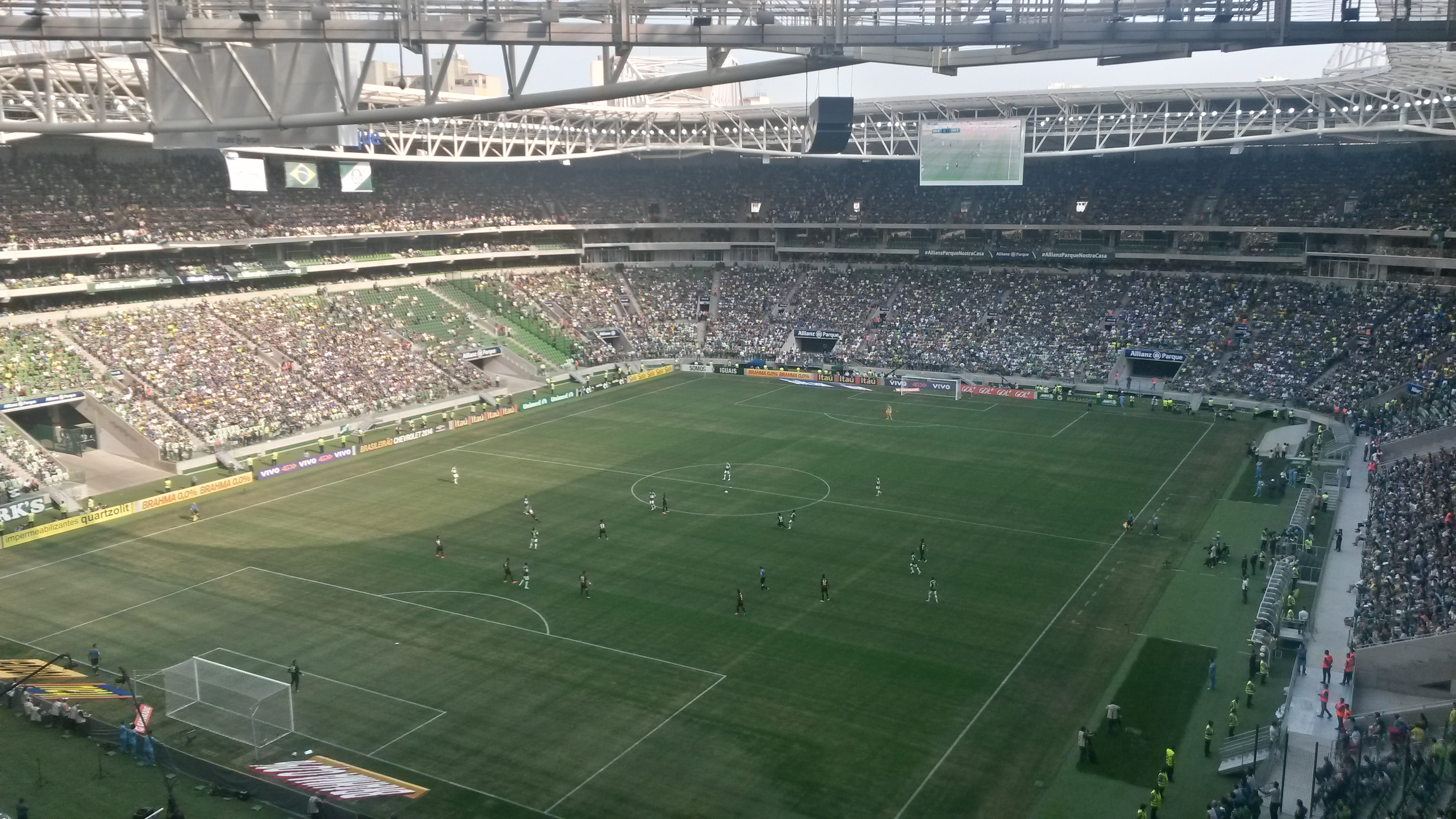
Allianz Parque in December 2014

The Allianz Parque has received much praise from the world's media, such as the Spanish site Elgoldigital.com, which considered it the most spectacular arena in the world, and the site Goal.com by Italian version, which defined it as the new contemporary architectural jewel of São Paulo.

On February 19, 2015, the Allianz Parque was named by popular vote the Stadium of The Year 2014. The leading competition was organized by Stadiony.net and StadiumDB.com, two websites dedicated to sports stadia. The competition was for venues opened in 2014, with Palmeiras stadium among 32 entries worldwide. Between January 17 and February 17, 2015, Allianz Parque got about 34,000 votes and 134,725 points. San Mamés Barria, in Spain, and Otkritie Arena, in Russia, have had 96,712 and 89,518 points each one and figured on second and third place, respectively. The renovated century-old Palestra Italia competed with seven other Brazilian arenas: Arena Corinthians, Arena da Amazônia, Arena da Baixada, Arena das Dunas, Arena Pantanal, Beira Rio and Estádio Kléber Andrade.

Allianz Parque was occupying one of three top spots nearly all the time, from day one. And that result was achieved without any campaign to support it. In fact, it wasn't until the last few days that the stadium itself promoted the vote via one Facebook post. A magnificent sign of support from Palmeiras supporters and not only them. The stadium also received significant number of points from voters in Europe and beyond. The final number of points is stunning: 134,725 is more than all previous winners received combined (!!!). You might think one of the World Cup stadiums might grab first place. Well, not this time!

— Statement released by the English site "Stadium DataBase"

=== Popular culture ===
To celebrate the opening of Allianz Parque, Allianz launched in December 2014 the mini-game Allianz Goal for Xbox Live, an online gaming service of Microsoft's Xbox consoles. The game content, designed in partnership with Ogilvy & Mather, a WPP company, aims to make football fans, especially young people, experience the brand of the Arena and interact with photos and information about this and five other arenas sponsored by Allianz around the world.

== Awards ==
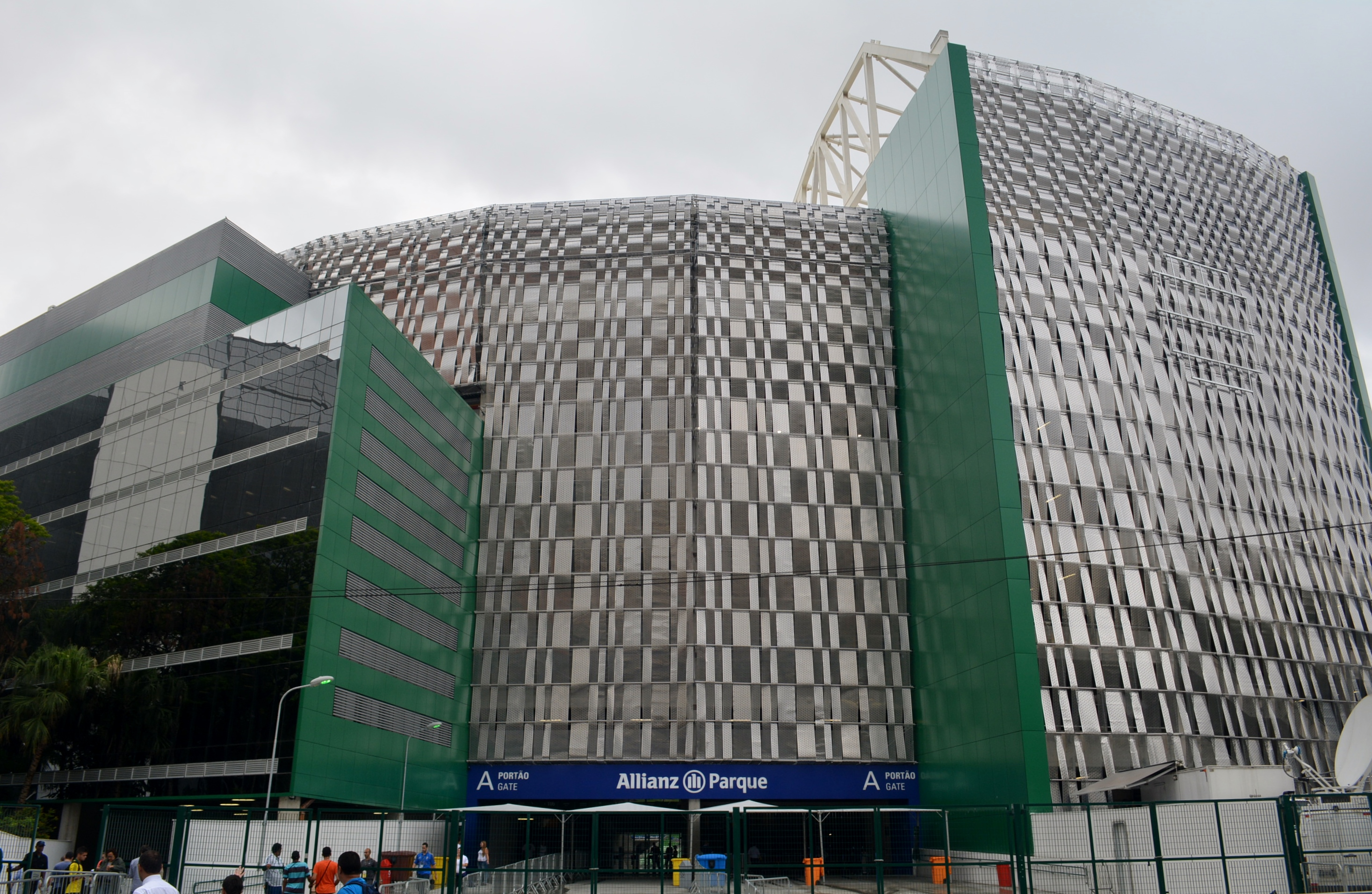
Allianz Parque facade, February 2015

On September 3, 2014, the architectural design of the arena received the Master Award at the 11th edition of the Grand Prix of Corporate Architecture, considered one of the most important architecture awards in Latin America. The arena also received the Sports Spotlight Award, category "Completed Work". The award was based on two evaluation criteria: architectural quality and benefits of the project for the region, noting various sectors of activity, such as health, education, sports, hotels, offices, etc.

On November 12, 2014, the construction of the arena was awarded in the category "Environmental Management at Works" at the 3rd Seconci Award for Occupational Safety and Health, organized by the São Paulo State Civil Construction Social Services (SECONCI-SP). Among the environmental management system implemented by the construction company, there were a waste management plan, erosion prevention measures, soil and water pollution control, water reuse and engineering control of noise levels. About 90% of all waste was reused or recycled, with 16 thousand cubic meters used in the work itself. The Palestra Italia stadium's old grass field was donated to the Mayor of the City of São Paulo to be reused in a town square.

== Allianz Parque Tour ==
On March 18, 2015, was inaugurated the "Allianz Parque Tour", which offers a guide service to the public with a trained Arena guide. In partnership with Futebol Tour company, the service offers a narrative journey through exclusive areas of the stadium, such as press boxes, cabins, convention center, press conference area, dressing rooms and field of play. The tour is available from Wednesday to Sunday (except on game days, other events or holidays) and lasts approximately one hour.

== Controversies ==
=== Delays in opening ===
Initially planned to be opened in late 2012, the Allianz Parque has suffered from delays due to bureaucracy and construction challenges. The first deadline for finalizing the works was in the first half of 2013, then for the second half of that year, for February of the following year, and finally for the second half of 2014, when the works were completed.

=== Incidents and alleged irregularities ===
In April 2013, the collapse of three beams in the Arena works left one person dead and another injured. The collapse happened where the new grandstand was built on the old structure of the Palestra Italia Stadium.

The collapse occurred at the same time in which the prosecution attempted to impound the works. The prosecutors questioned, besides the environmental degradation and traffic impacts, if the work was a renovation or a new construction, because the permit Palmeiras had since 2002 was for renovation, not demolition. It was precisely for this reason that the grandstands were not demolished, the same local where the worker died in 2013.

=== Discussion between Palmeiras and WTorre ===
In February 2014, Palmeiras attempted to resolve an impasse with WTorre at the FGV Chamber of Conciliation and Arbitration. The main cause of disagreement between the club and the company is the division of seats in the Allianz Parque. WTorre claims to have the right to sell 100% of the seats, while Palmeiras claims that the contract set a maximum number of ten thousand seats to be sold by the builder. However, there is no discussion as to the amounts to be collected from the box office, which are 100% of the club, but today the marketing impasse to sell the seats is still being discussed.

== See also ==
- Palestra Itália Stadium
- Pacaembu Stadium
- Morumbi Stadium
- Canindé Stadium
- Arena Corinthians
- List of football stadiums in Brazil
- Lists of stadiums
