= Alfragide Towers =

Buildings in Alfragide, Portugal

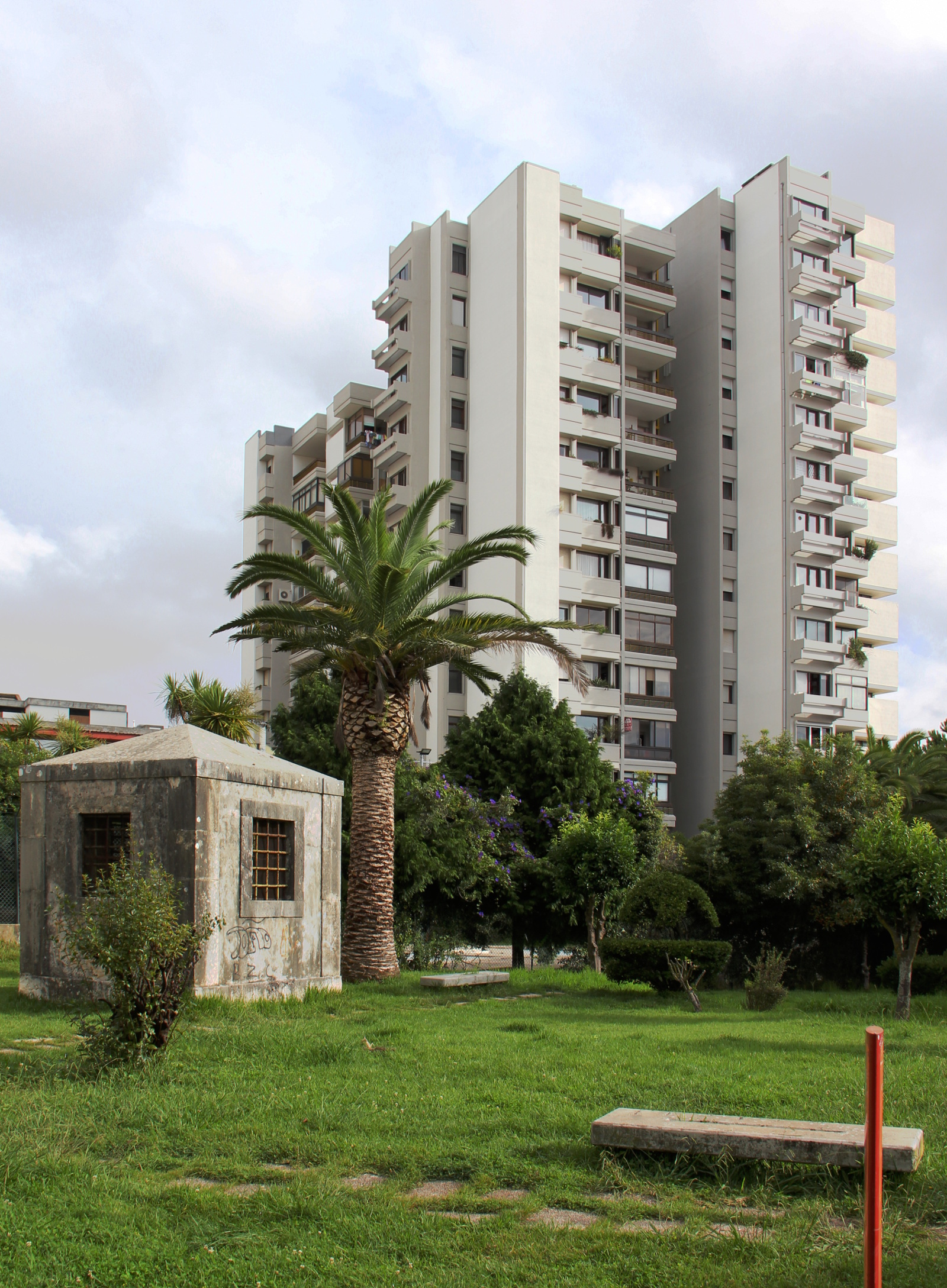
- East tower. The stone building in the foreground is part of the Águas Livres Aqueduct
- Interactive map of the Alfragide Towers area

General information
- Type: Residential flats
- Architectural style: Brutalism
- Location: Amadora, Portugal
- Coordinates: 38°43′59.1708″N 9°13′4.71″W
- Construction started: 1968
- Completed: 1974

Technical details
- Material: Reinforced concrete

Design and construction
- Architects: Conceição Silva and Tomás Taveira

The Alfragide Towers (Portuguese: Torres de Alfragide) are a set of residential buildings in Alfragide, Amadora, Portugal. The complex consists of three residential towers and a shopping centre at ground level, connecting the three buildings. It also contains an underground car park and a complex of swimming pools, currently unused. It is an example of brutalism-influenced architecture.

== Buildings ==
The three residential towers have different heights, ranging from 10 to 15 floors. Each tower's footprint is similar to a four-leaf clover, with a central services core featuring stairs, elevators and garbage chutes, and four "subtowers" stemming from the core. The apartments feature different layouts, including single-storey flats and two-storey maisonettes.

The two-storey shopping centre at ground level features shops, cafés, and offices. Until the late 1980s it also featured a cinema, currently closed.

== Architecture ==
Tomás Taveira was the main architect responsible for the project, while working at Conceição Silva's architectural practice. He cites James Stirling as his main influence for this project, especially the University of Leicester's Engineering Building. The project also shares similarities with Alison and Peter Smithson's Robin Hood Gardens estate and Denys Lasdun's Keeling House.

== Gallery ==
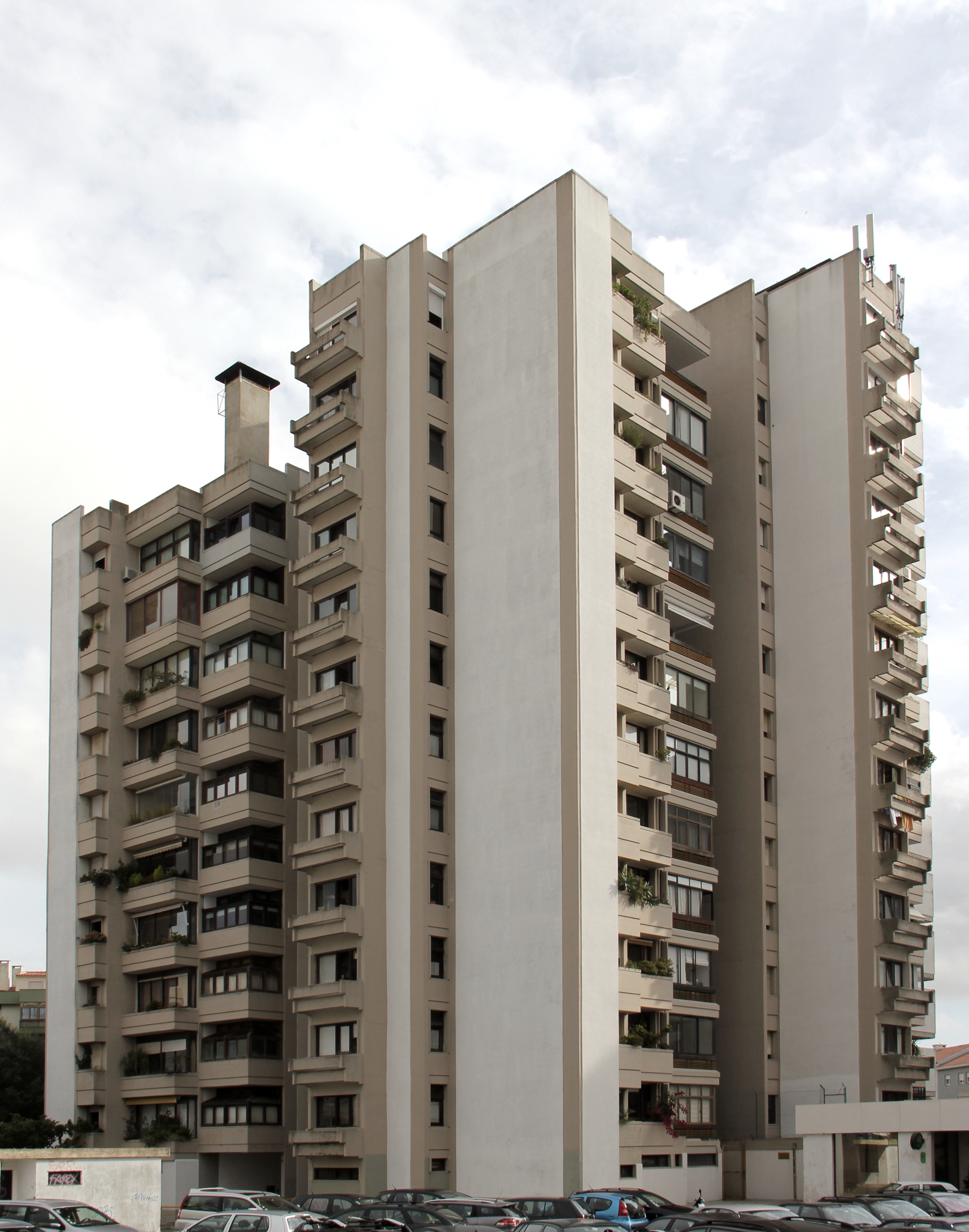
North tower. The entrance to the shopping centre is visible on the lower right corner

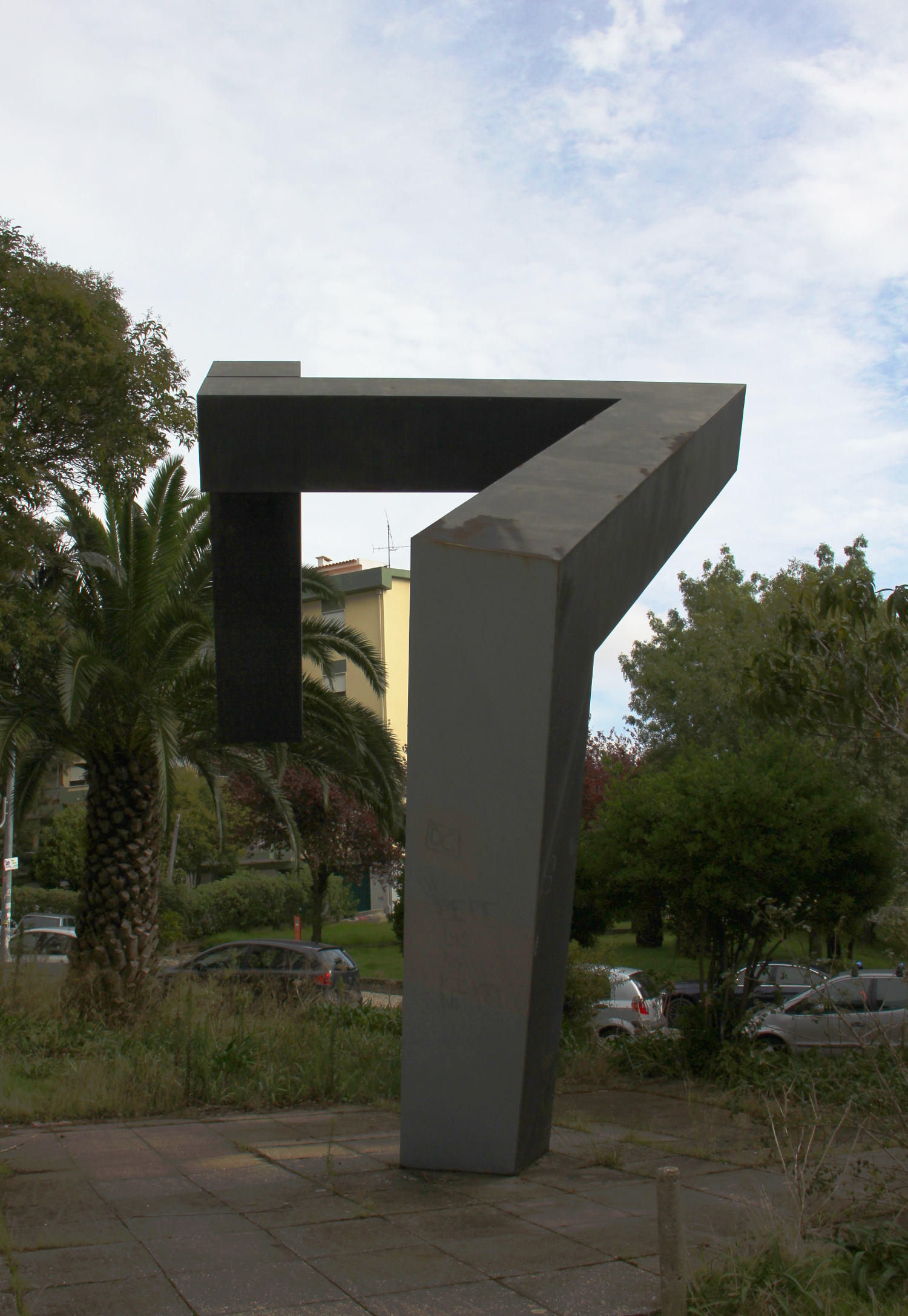
Sculpture at ground level

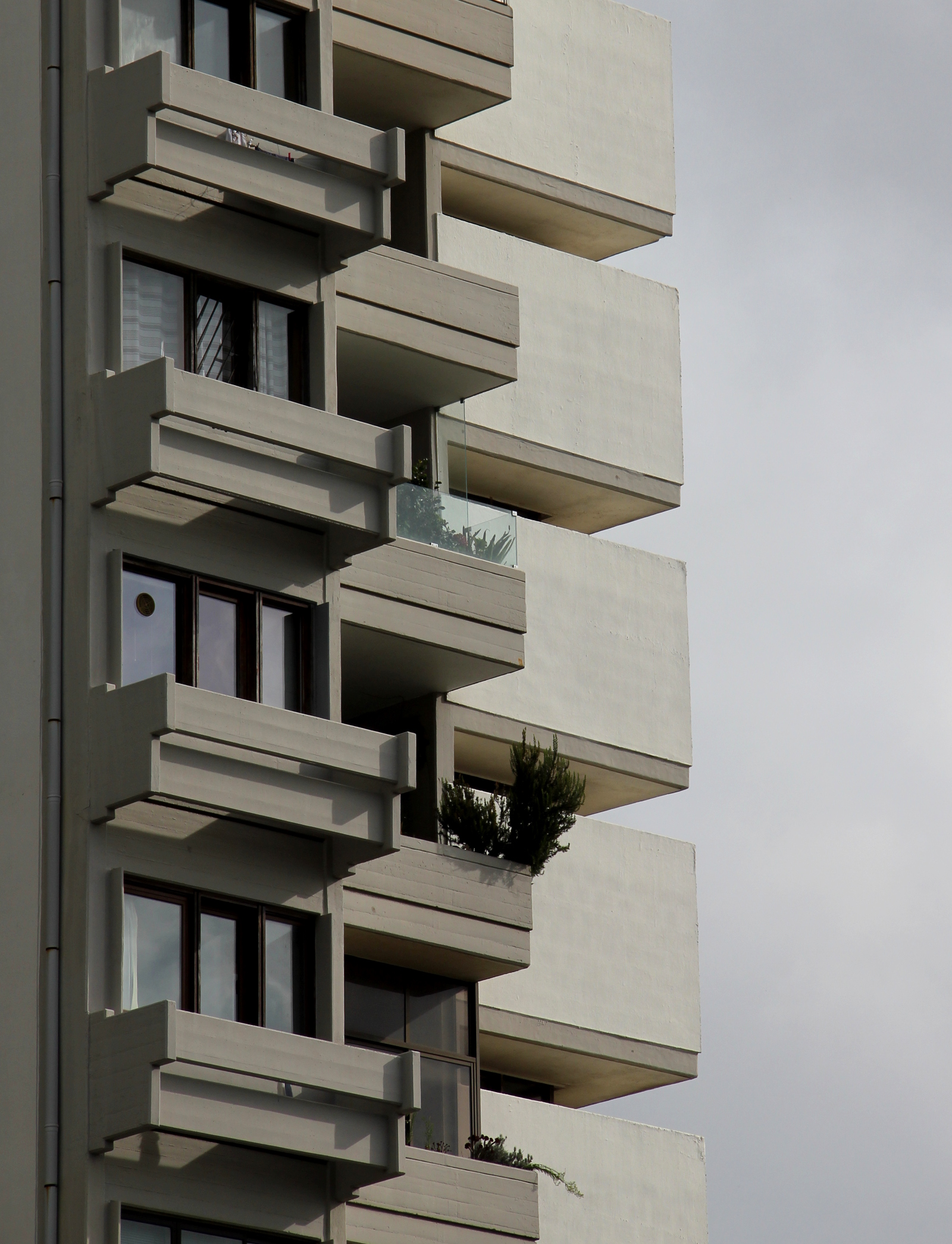
Balconies, detail

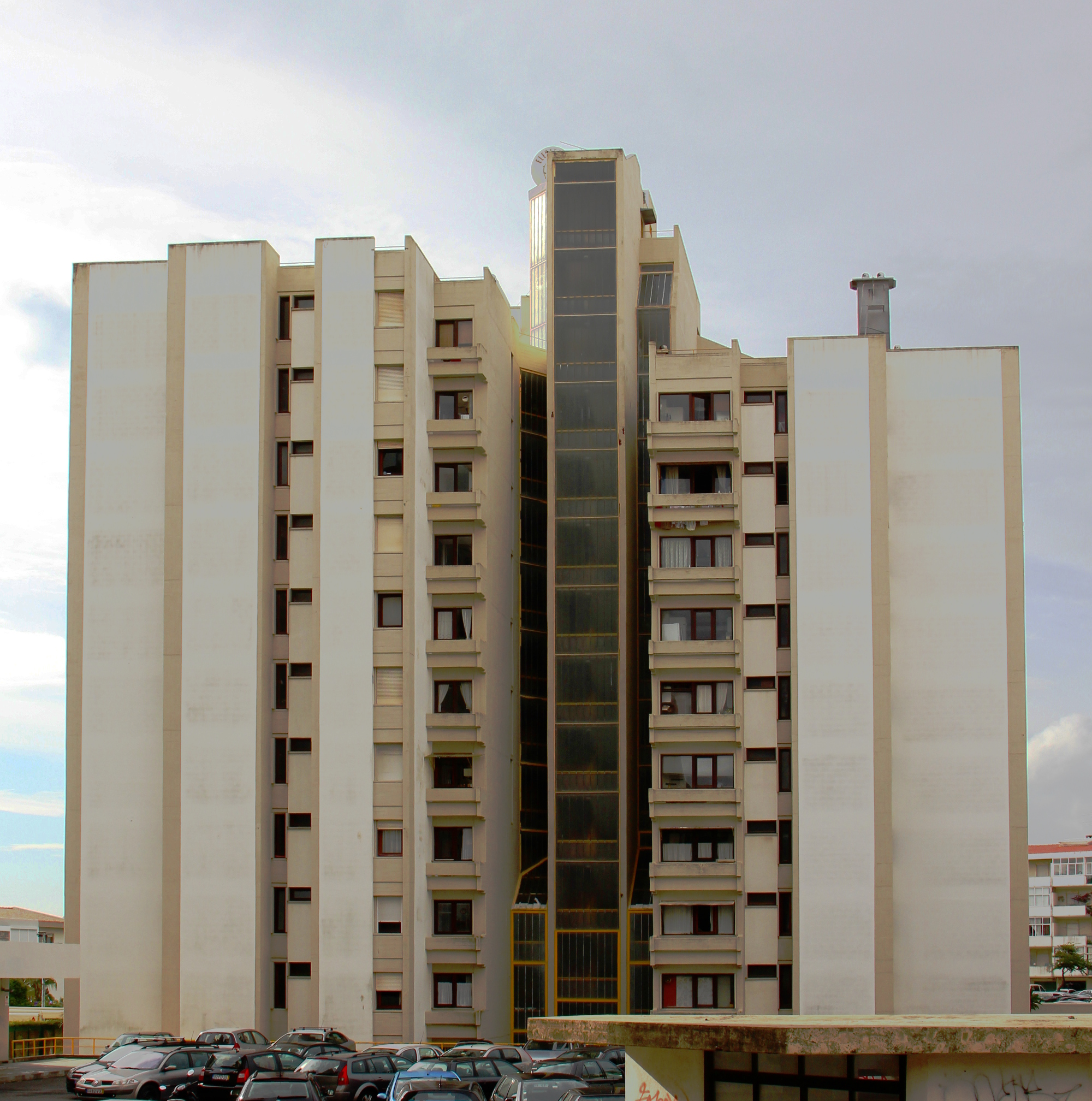
South tower, as seen from the north

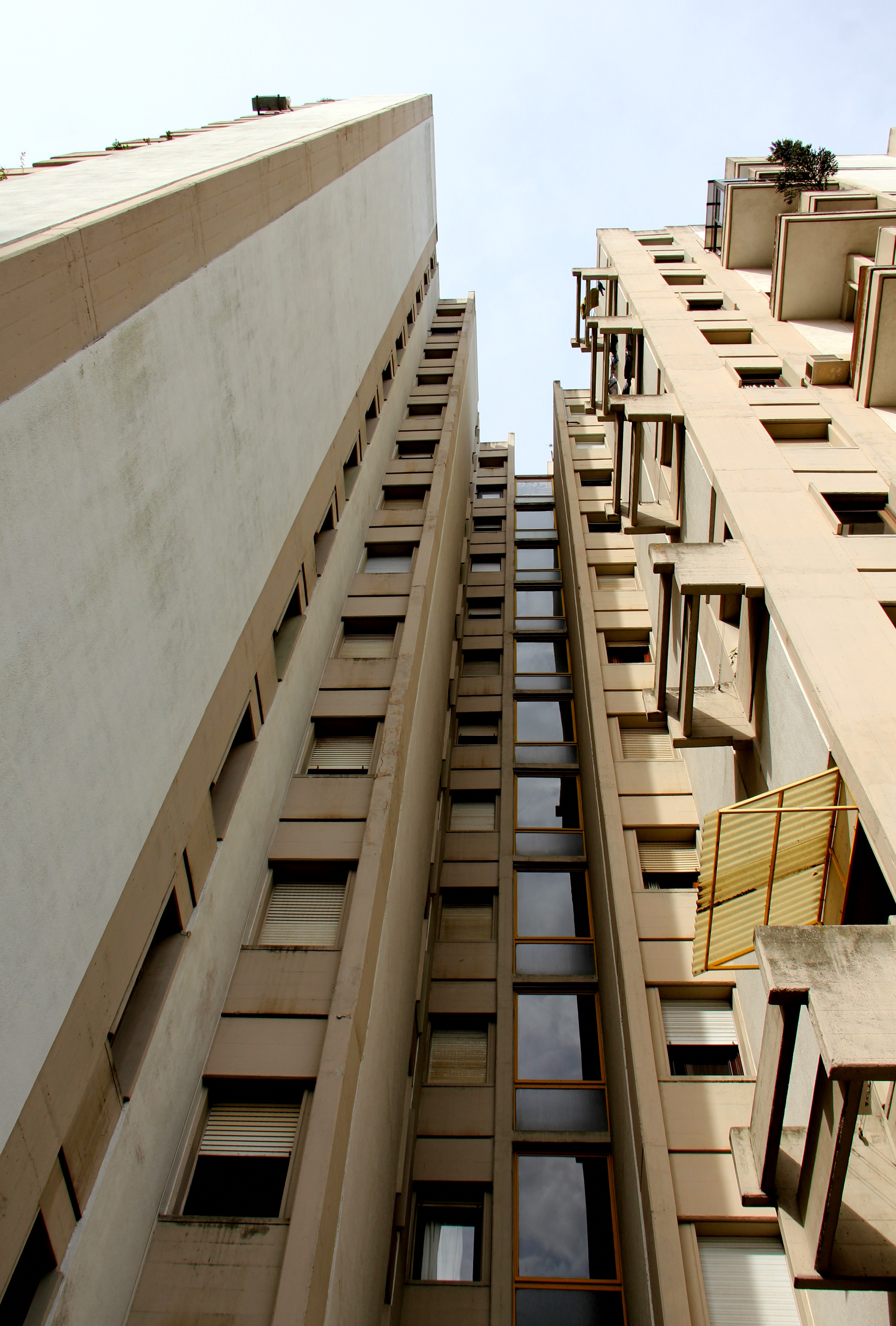
North tower, detail

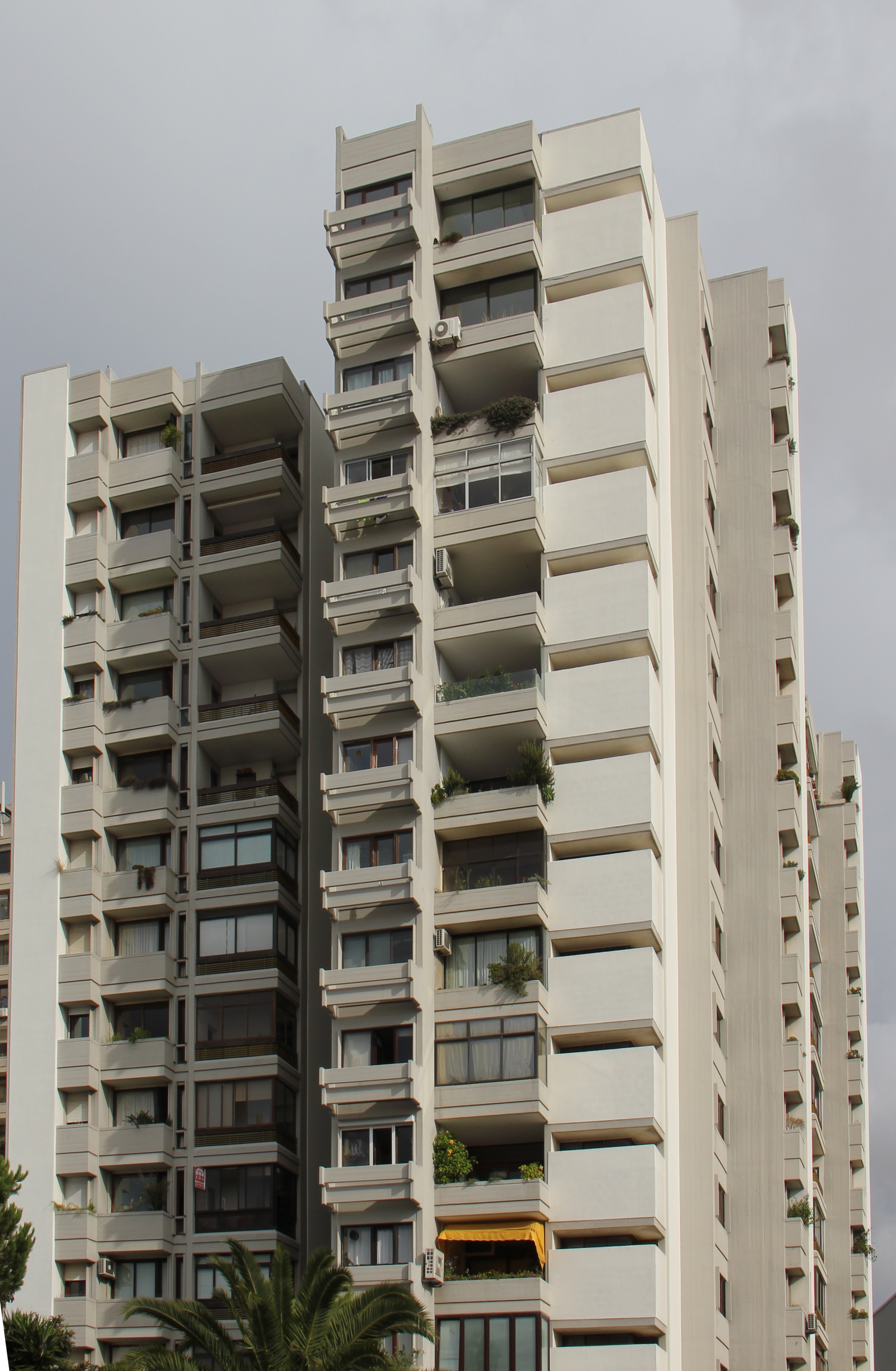
East tower as seen from street level
