= Alto de Santana =

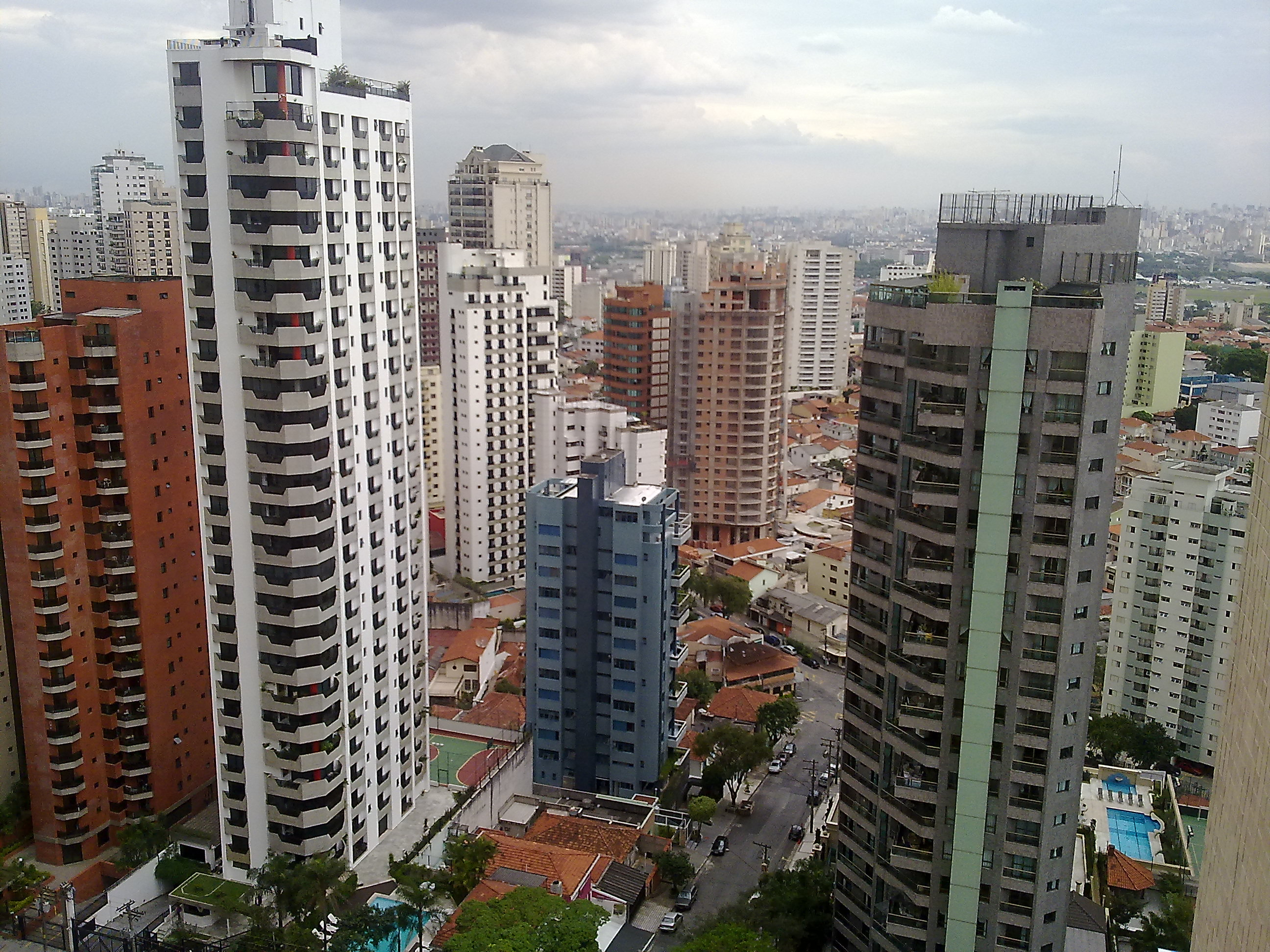
- Streets: Pedro Doll, Francisca Júlia and Pontins

- Location within São Paulo Location within Brazil
- Coordinates: 23°29′31″S 46°37′34″W
- Country: Brazil
- Region: Southeast
- State: São Paulo
- Municipality: São Paulo
- Administrative Zone: Northeast
- Subprefecture: Santana-Tucuruvi
- District: Santana

Alto de Santana (Santana Heights) is a name commonly used, especially by business, to refer to an upper middle class area of Santana district in São Paulo city, Brazil. The term is used informally to refer to the bairro of Vila Santana (Santana Village) and the elevated region of the Santana bairro.

Among the major routes that pass through the region are: Voluntários da Pátria street, Francisca Júlia street, Pedro Doll street, Doutor Guilherme Cristoffel street and Doutor Luis Lustosa da Silva street. In Alto de Santana is located the Baruel Mansion, an old castle founded in the 19th century.

The region is classified by CRECI (Federal Council of Real Estate) as Value of Zone B like other upper middle class areas of the capital: Brooklin, Cerqueira César e Paraíso.

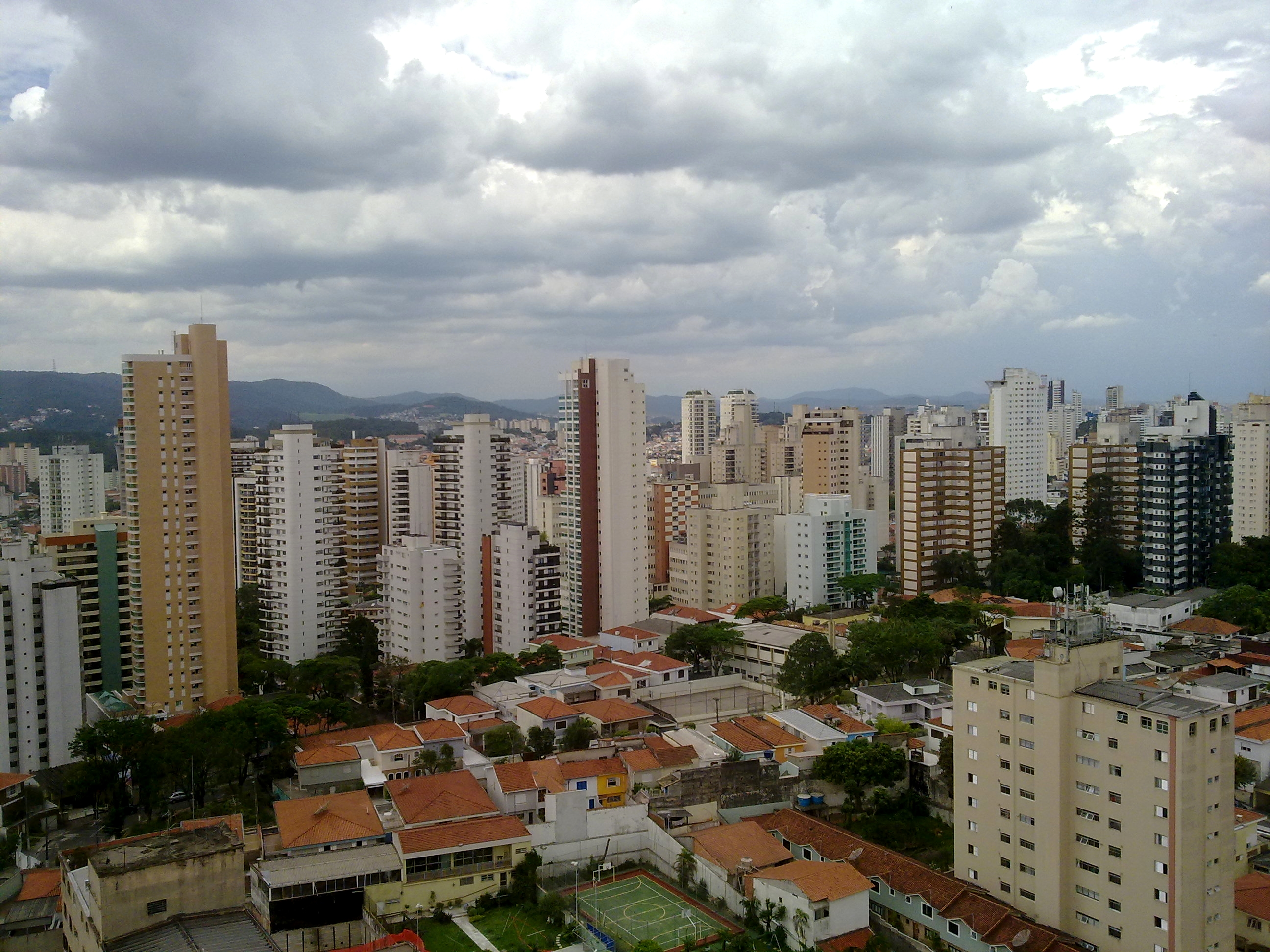
Skyline of the region

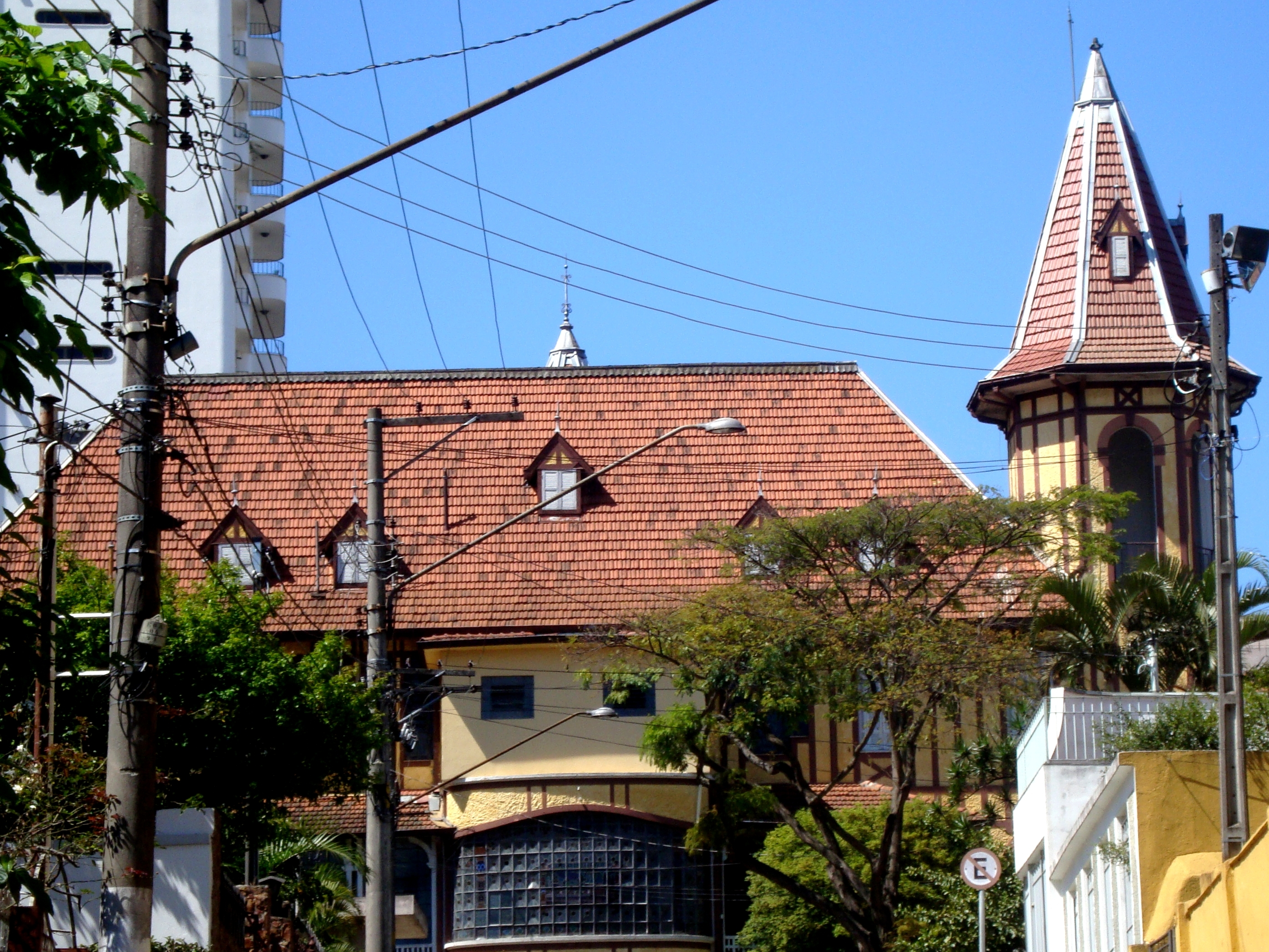
Baruel Mansion, the castle

== See also ==
- Santana district
