= Milionário & José Rico =

Brazilian sertanejo duo

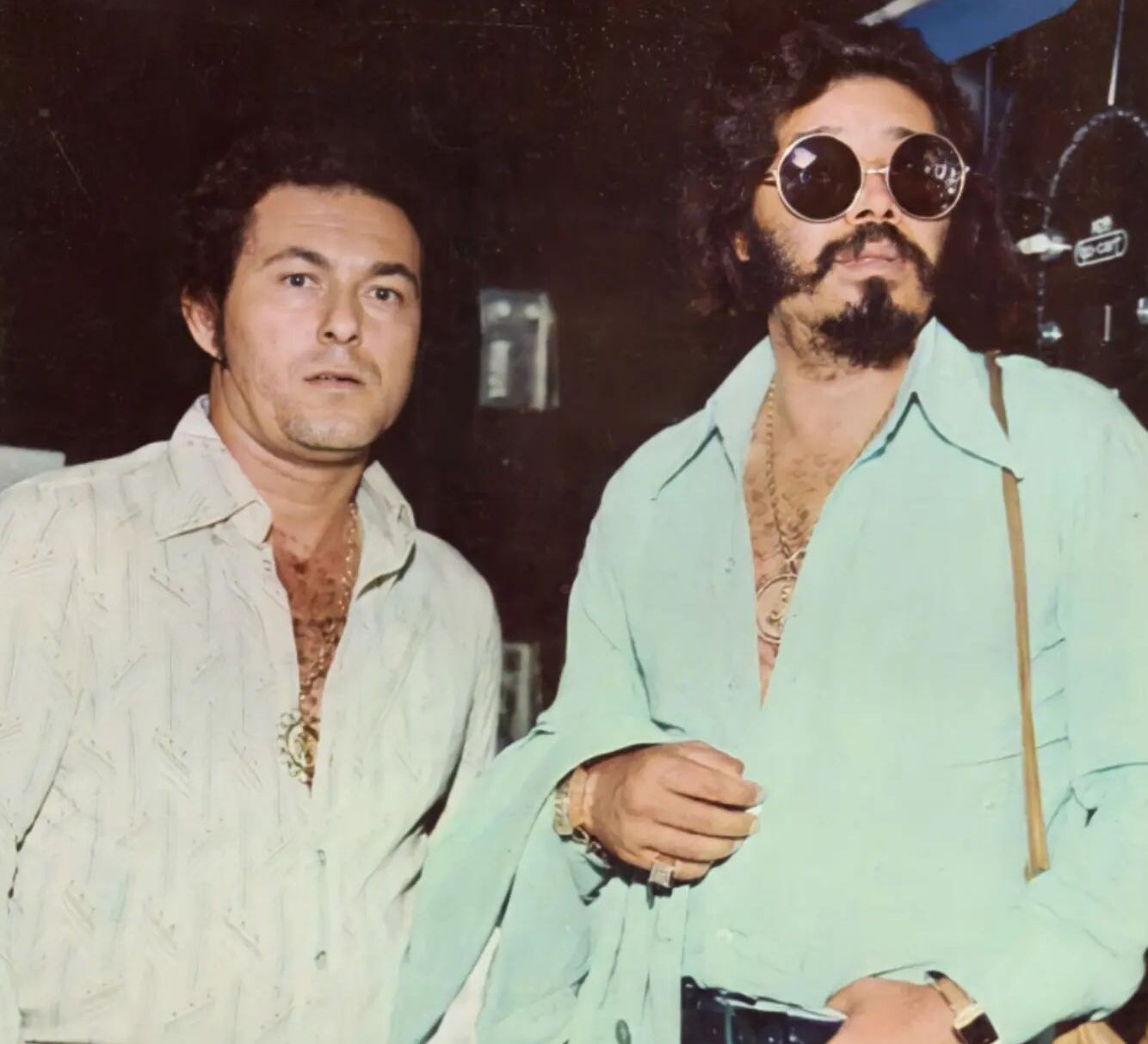
- Milionário & José Rico in 1980

Background information
- Origin: São Paulo, Brazil
- Genres: Sertanejo
- Years active: 1970–1991; 1994–2015
- Labels: Chantecler/Continental; Warner Music Brasil
- Past members: Milionário (Romeu Januário de Matos); José Rico (José Alves dos Santos)

Milionário & José Rico was a Brazilian sertanejo music duo formed in 1970 by Romeu Januário de Mattos (Milionário) and José Alves dos Santos (José Rico). Over their forty-year career, they became known as "As Gargantas de Ouro do Brasil" ("the golden throats of Brazil") due to their vocal power, achieving success with compositions such as Estrada da Vida (1977) and Decida (2003). The duo gained national and international recognition, particularly with the albums Estrada da Vida (1977) and Tribunal do Amor (1982), releasing more than twenty records until 1991, when they temporarily parted ways.

In 1994, they resumed their work with the album Nasci Para Te Amar, producing eight more successful projects in the following decades, such as Sentimental Demais (2000) and O Dono do Mundo (2002). The duo came to a definitive end with the death of José Rico in March 2015 at the age of 68 due to cardiac complications. Subsequently, Milionário formed a new partnership with singer Marciano, which remained active until the latter's death in January 2019.

Their compositions incorporated influences from Mexican rancheras and Paraguayan guaranias to the traditional sertanejo music.

== History ==
=== Background ===
Romeu Januário de Matos was born in 1940 in Monte Santo de Minas, Minas Gerais, and José Alves dos Santos was born six years later, in 1946, in São José do Belmonte, Pernambuco. The two met between the late 1960s and early 1970s, although there are different versions of this first encounter. Some sources indicate they were introduced by a musician known as Cambota in Paranavaí, Paraná, around 1965. Another account, given by José Rico himself in a 2014 interview, states that he met Milionário while living in the Jaçanã neighborhood of São Paulo and was taken in by him in Vila Ede. Before adopting their definitive name, they performed as Tubarão & José Rico. It was while watching Programa Silvio Santos that Romeu was inspired by the term carnê milionário ("millionaire installment plan") and decided to adopt "Milionário" as his stage name, after which the duo became known as Milionário & José Rico.

=== 1973–1975: First albums and consolidation ===
The duo recorded their first LP for the Continental/Chantecler label in 1973, simply titled Milionário & José Rico. The album included tracks such as "Inversão de Valores" and "De Longe Também Se Ama". Two years later, in 1975, they released Volume 2, Ilusão Perdida, considered by Milionário himself to be his favorite album from that period. The title track "Ilusão Perdida", composed by the duo, and "Dê Amor Para Quem Te Ama" stood out, helping to solidify their career in the sertanejo scene.

=== 1976–1991: Rise, national success, and separation ===
The duo's fame grew rapidly with subsequent releases. In 1977, already being called "The Golden Throats of Brazil", they reached their peak with the overwhelming success of the song "Estrada da Vida", the title track of LP Volume 5. The song, written by José Rico, became an anthem of the duo's career. They continued recording frequently, always with great public acceptance. However, after releasing LP Volume 20, titled Vontade Dividida, in 1991, Milionário and José Rico decided to separate. The announcement was made after a concert in Ipuã, São Paulo, on September 7 of that year, marking a pause in a partnership that had already lasted over twenty years. During this period, the duo starred in two films: Na Estrada da Vida (Highway of Life; 1980), directed by Nelson Pereira dos Santos, and Sonhei com Você (I Dreamed about You; 1989), directed by Ney Santanna. Na Estrada da Vida was shown in film festivals overseas; the success of the film in China made the duo one of the first Brazilian artists to play in the country, in a one-month tour sponsored by the Chinese government in 1986.

=== 1994–2015: Reunion, final works, and the duo's end ===
In 1994, Milionário and José Rico reunited and recorded LP Volume 21, titled Nasci Para Te Amar, which was also their first CD release. The album included a tribute by José Rico to racing driver Ayrton Senna, who had died that year. The duo remained active in the following decades, releasing works such as the CD and DVD Atravessando Gerações (2008), which celebrated their greatest hits and included new compositions. The forty-five-year trajectory of the duo came to an end on March 3, 2015, with the death of José Rico at age 68 due to cardiac arrest in Americana, São Paulo.

== Discography ==
- Milionário & José Rico (1973)
- Ilusão Perdida (1975)
- Volume 3 (1976)
- As Gargantas de Ouro do Brasil - Volume 4 (1977)
- Estrada da Vida (1977)
- Rei Sem Trono (1978)
- Caminhos da Vida (1978)
- Realidade (1979)
- Trilha Sonora do Filme Na Estrada da Vida (1980)
- Amor Dividido (1980)
- Escravo do Amor (1981)
- Tribunal do Amor (1982)
- Amor Infinito (1983)
- Lembrança (1984)
- Minha Prece (1985)
- Levando a Vida (1987)
- Os Grandes Sucessos de Milionário & José Rico (1988)
- Viva a Vida (1988)
- Trilha Sonora do Filme Sonhei Com Você (1989)
- Vontade Dividida (1991)
- Nasci Para Te Amar (1994)
- De Cara Com a Saudade (1996)
- As Gargantas de Ouro do Brasil - Volume 23 (1997)
- Milionário & José Rico - Ao Vivo (1999)
- Sentimental Demais (2000)
- O Dono do Mundo (2002)
- Decida (2003)
- Atravessando Gerações (2008)
- Nossa História (2011)
