= Casa Verde =

Casa Verde may refer to:

- Subprefecture of Casa Verde, São Paulo
- Casa Verde (district of São Paulo)
- Casa Verde High School, a high school in Casa Grande, Arizona
- Casa Verde (Iron Guard), the building that served as headquarters for the Iron Guard, an interwar Romanian political movement.
