= Tremembé (disambiguation) =

Tremembé is a municipality in the Brazilian state of São Paulo.

Tremembé may also refer to:

- Tremembé (district of São Paulo), a district of São Paulo
- Tremembé people, an indigenous people of Brazil
- Tremembé language, the extinct language of the Tremembé people
- Jaçanã-Tremembé, a subprefecture of São Paulo, containing Tremembé district
