= Subprefecture of Vila Maria-Vila Guilherme =

Coordinates: 23°30′52″S 46°34′43″W

- Subprefecture
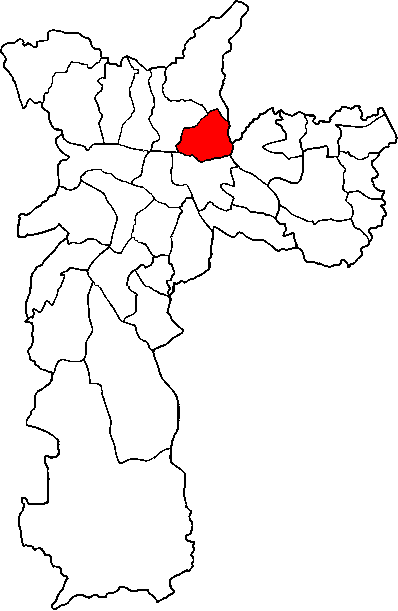
- Location of the Subprefecture of Vila Maria-Vila Guilherme in São Paulo

- Location of municipality of São Paulo within the State of São Paulo
- Country: Brazil
- Region: Southeast
- State: São Paulo
- Municipality: São Paulo
- Administrative Zone: Northeast
- Districts: Vila Maria, Vila Guilherme, Vila Medeiros

Government
  - Type: Subprefecture
  - Subprefect: Antônio de Pádua Perosa

Area
  - Total: 26.87 km^{2} (10.37 sq mi)

Population (2008)
  - Total: 287,866
- Website: Subprefeitura Vila Maria-Vila Guilherme (Portuguese)

The Subprefecture of Vila Maria-Vila Guilherme is one of 32 subprefectures of the city of São Paulo, Brazil. It comprises three districts: Vila Maria, Vila Guilherme, and Vila Medeiros.

This is the subprefecture where are the roads for Rio de Janeiro, Minas Gerais and the São Paulo–Guarulhos International Airport (in the neighbouring municipality of Guarulhos), thus forming an important logistic hub of the city, hosting many transport and storage companies.
