= Line 19 (São Paulo Metro) =

Proposed metro line

São Paulo Metro Line 19 (Sky Blue)

Overview
- Status: Proposed
- Owner: Government of the State of São Paulo
- Locale: São Paulo, Brazil; Guarulhos, Brazil
- Termini: Anhangabaú; Bosque Maia
- Connecting lines: Line 1 (São Paulo Metro) Line 2 (São Paulo Metro) Line 3 (São Paulo Metro)
- Stations: 15

Service
- Type: Rapid transit
- System: São Paulo Metro
- Operator(s): CMSP
- Depot(s): Vila Medeiros railyard
- Rolling stock: 31 6-car trains
- Daily ridership: 500,000 (projected, first phase)
- Ridership: 621,000/business day (projected, first phase)

History
- Planned opening: 2030 (estimated)

Technical
- Line length: 17.6 km (10.9 mi) (First phase)
- Character: Underground
- Track gauge: 1,435 mm (4 ft 8 1/2 in) standard gauge
- Signalling: CBTC

Line 19 (Sky Blue) (Portuguese: Linha 19–Celeste) is a planned line of the São Paulo Metro.

At 17.6 kilometres (10.9 mi) in length at its first phase, the line will be the first subway line to serve the municipality of Guarulhos, with Line 13-Jade of the commuter rail system already serving the city since 2018. Construction is expected to begin in 2027.

== Background ==
Guarulhos is the second-largest city in the state of São Paulo, yet was not served by rail transport until the opening of the CPTM commuter rail's Line 13-Jade in 2018. Thus, planning for Line 19 began to link Guarulhos to the São Paulo Metro, along with Vila Medeiros and Vila Maria. It will be underground for its entire length.

== Planning ==
São Paulo Metro originally planned to begin tendering for the construction of Line 19 in April 2020, but this was delayed to May.

== Stations ==
Code	Station	Integration	City	Platform
TBA	Anhangabaú	Bandeira Bus Terminal; Campo Limpo–Rebouças–Centro Bus Corridor; Pirituba–Lapa–Centro Bus Corridor; Santo Amaro–9 de Julho–Centro Bus Corridor	São Paulo	Side platforms
TBA	São Bento	Line 1 (São Paulo Metro)	São Paulo	Side platforms
TBA	Cerealista	Companhia Paulista de Trens Metropolitanos Line 10 (CPTM) Line 11 (CPTM)	São Paulo	Side platforms
TBA	Silva Teles	-	São Paulo	Side platforms
TBA	Catumbi	-	São Paulo	Side platforms
TBA	Vila Maria	-	São Paulo	Side platforms
TBA	Santo Eduardo	-	São Paulo	Side platforms
TBA	Cerejeiras	-	São Paulo	Side platforms
TBA	Vila Sabrina	-	São Paulo	Side platforms
TBA	Jardim Julieta	-	São Paulo	Side platforms
TBA	Itapegica	-	Guarulhos	Side platforms
TBA	Dutra	(Planned); Dutra Bus Terminal (Planned)	Guarulhos	Side platforms
TBA	Vila Augusta	-	Guarulhos	Side platforms
TBA	Guarulhos Centro	-	Guarulhos	Side platforms
TBA	Bosque Maia	-	Guarulhos	Side platforms
