= Cidade Ademar =

Cidade Ademar may refer to:

- Subprefecture of Cidade Ademar, São Paulo
- Cidade Ademar (district of São Paulo)
