= Jaçanã (district of São Paulo) =

District of São Paulo, Brazil

Coordinates: 23.466863°S 46.579344°W

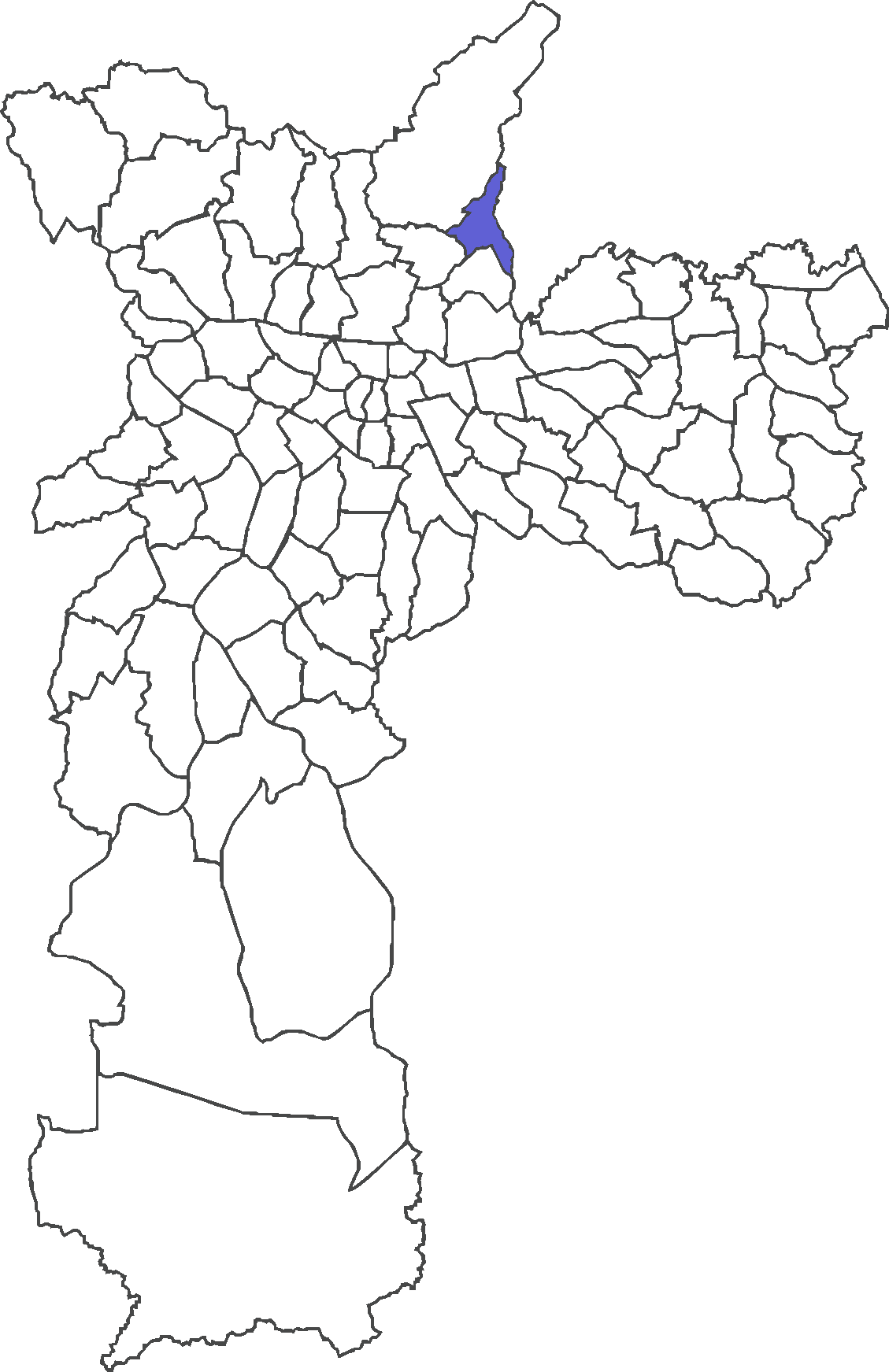
- Location in the city of São Paulo
- Country: Brazil
- State: São Paulo
- Region: Southeast
- City: São Paulo
- Administrative Zone: Northeast
- Subprefecture: Jaçanã-Tremembé

Government
  - Type: Subprefecture
  - Subprefect: Izaul Segalla Júnior

Area
  - Total: 7.8 km^{2} (3.0 sq mi)

Population (2000)
  - Total: 91.649
  - Density: 11.749/km^{2} (30.43/sq mi)
- HDI: 0.816 –high
- Website: Subprefecture of Jaçanã/Tremembé

Jaçanã (Portuguese pronunciation: [ʒasɐˈnɐ̃]) is a district of the city of São Paulo, Brazil. It constitutes with Tremembé the subprefecture Jaçanã-Tremembé, marking the northern boundaries of the city.

Like Parelheiros, most of the area of this borough is rural, although in the southern areas there is an urban area. It contains the Cantareira Park, the largest native urban forest in the world.

In 1870, the borough was known as Uroguapira because it was thought that there was gold (Portuguese ouro) in the area. As this was only a rumor, the name given by the aboriginal people for the region of the Cantareira was shortened to Guapira. On 1 June 1930, the name of the borough was changed to Jaçanã (a bird known in English as the wattled jacana).

The borough of Jaçanã became known not only in São Paulo, but also in diverse parts of Brazil because of the song "Trem das Onze", by Adoniran Barbosa. In 1949 Jaçanã became the site of the first film studio of São Paulo: the Cinematographic Company Maristela, the main cultural focus of the borough.

Located in the north of the city of São Paulo, the district of Jaçanã, according to Census 2000, carried out for the Brazilian Institute of Geography and Statistics (IBGE), has a population of approximately 91,649 inhabitants: 43,702 men and 47,947 women.
