= Cursino =

District of São Paulo, Brazil

Coordinates: 23.6028°S 46.6257°W

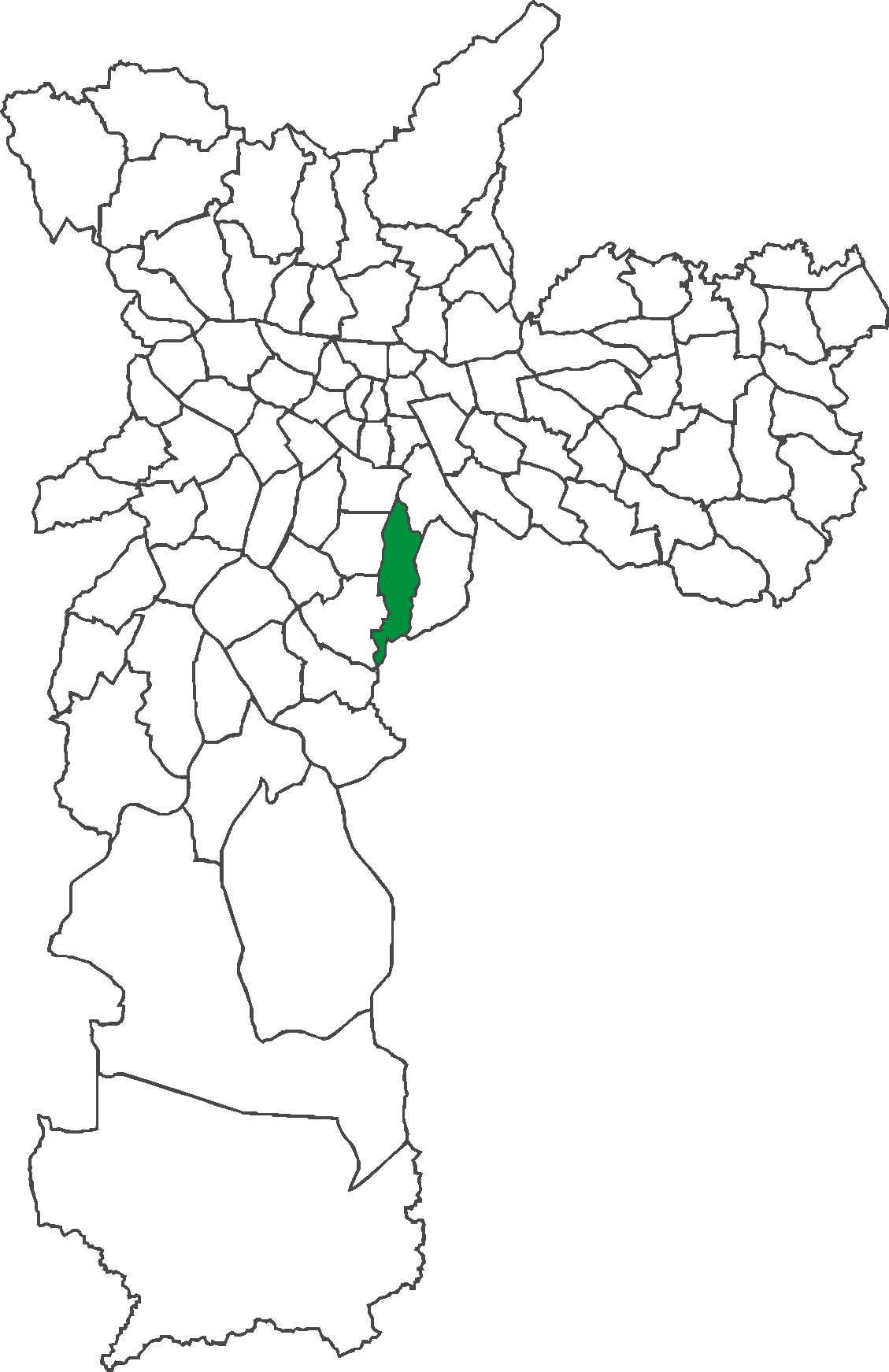
- District of the city of São Paulo
- Country: Brazil
- State: São Paulo
- Municipality: São Paulo
- Subprefecture: Ipiranga

Area
  - Total: 12.80 km^{2} (4.94 sq mi)

Population (2007)
  - Total: 109,088
  - Density: 8,523/km^{2} (22,070/sq mi)
- Website: Subprefecture of Ipiranga

Cursino is one of 96 districts in the city of São Paulo, Brazil.
