= Subprefecture of Santana-Tucuruvi =

Coordinates: 23°17′07″S 46°21′41″W

- Subprefecture
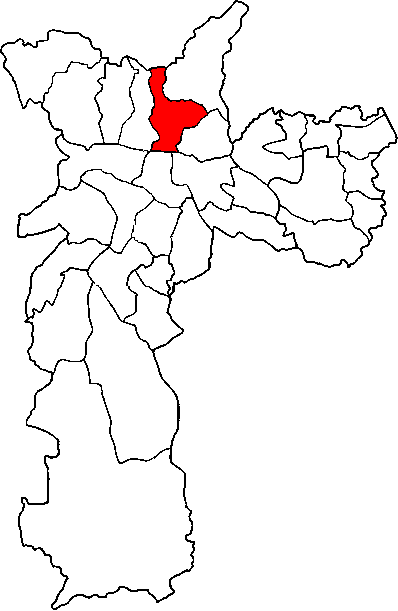
- Location of the Subprefecture of Santana-Tucuruvi in São Paulo

- Location of municipality of São Paulo within the State of São Paulo
- Country: Brazil
- Region: Southeast
- State: São Paulo
- Municipality: São Paulo
- Administrative Zone: Northeast
- Districts: Santana, Tucuruvi, Mandaqui

Government
  - Type: Subprefecture
  - Subprefect: Sérgio Teixeira Alves

Area
  - Total: 35.81 km^{2} (13.83 sq mi)

Population (2008)
  - Total: 304,062
- Website: Subprefeitura Santana-Tucuruvi (Portuguese)

The Subprefecture of Santana-Tucuruvi is one of 32 subprefectures of the city of São Paulo, Brazil. It comprises three districts: Santana, Tucuruvi, and Mandaqui.
