= Parada Inglesa (São Paulo Metro) =

São Paulo Metro station

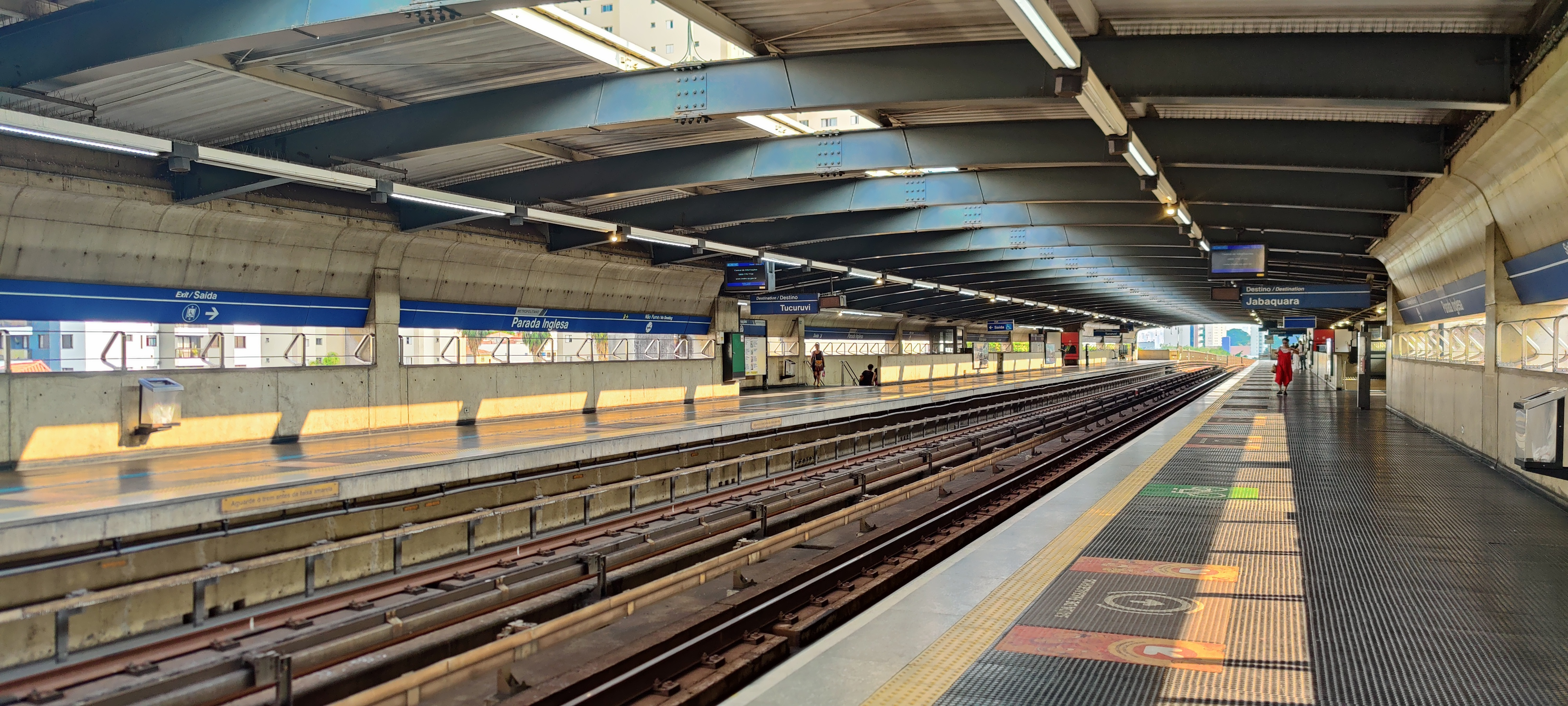
- Platform of the station

General information
- Location: Av. Luís Dumont Villares, 1721, Tucuruvi; São Paulo
- Coordinates: 23°29′14″S 46°36′32″W
- Owner: Government of the State of São Paulo
- Operator: São Paulo Metro
- Platforms: Side platforms
- Connections: Parada Inglesa Bus Terminal

Construction
- Structure type: Elevated
- Accessible: y

Other information
- Station code: PIG

History
- Opened: 29 April 1998
- Former names: Paulicéia

Passengers
- 12,000/business day

Services
Preceding station	São Paulo Metro	Following station
Tucuruvi Terminus	Line 1	Jardim São Paulo-Ayrton Senna towards Jabaquara
Track layout
Location

Parada Inglesa is a metro station on São Paulo Metro Line 1-Blue, located in the district of Tucuruvi, in São Paulo.

Belongs to the Line 1 north expansion plan, initiated in 1996. It would be named Paulicéia Station, according to the original project.

It was opened on 29 April 1998, along with stations Jardim São Paulo-Ayrton Senna and Tucuruvi. The project of the station was one of the awarded in the 5th Architecture Biennal of Buenos Aires, in the category Prémio Especial Del Jurado (Special Jury Award).

== Location ==
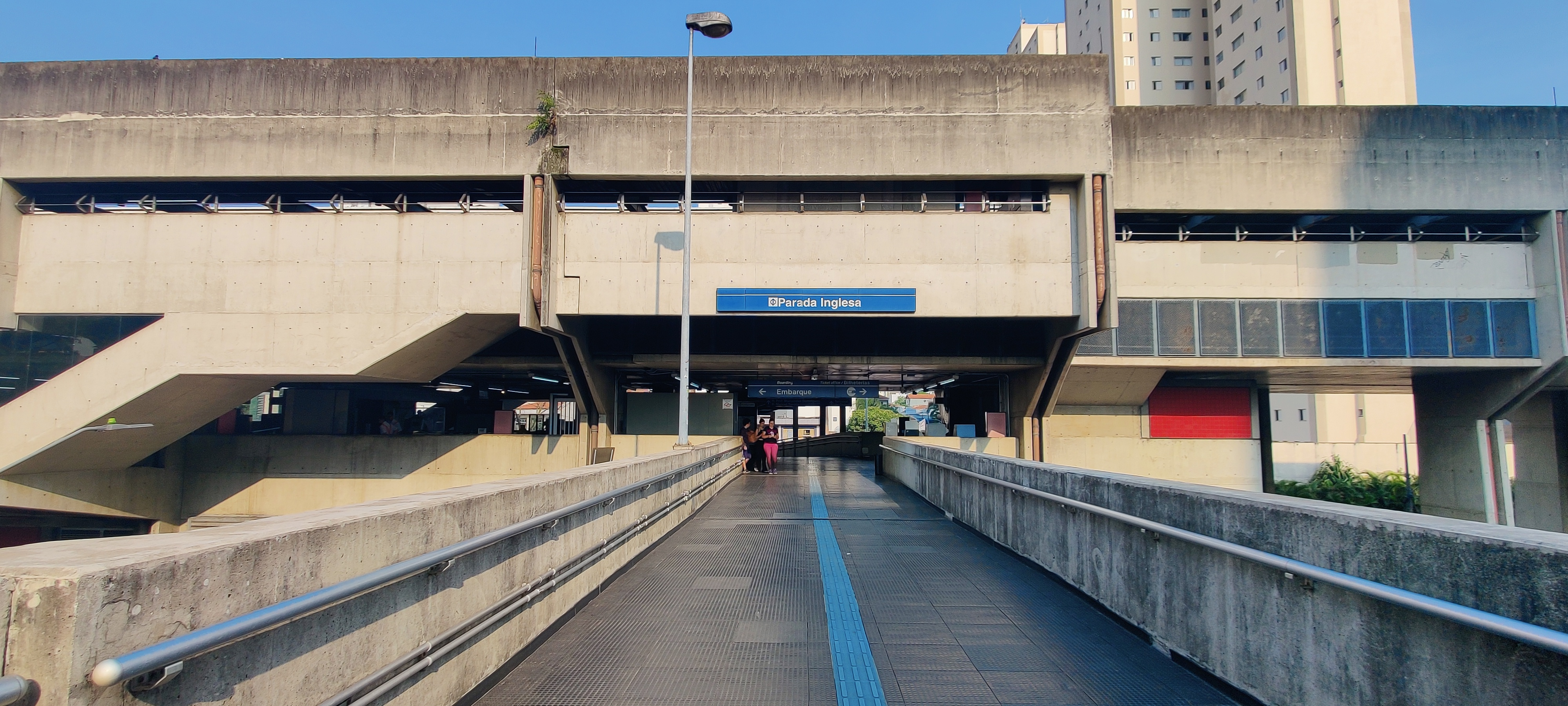
Entrance to the station

It is located in Avenida Luís Dumont Vilares, 1721, an avenue which mixes residential areas and restaurants. It's in the district of Tucuruvi, in North Side São Paulo. It's also connected to a bus terminal, with destination to local lines.

== Characteristics ==
It is an elevated station, located 10 metres (33 ft) above the ground, with apparent concrete structure, side platforms and metallic cover, with 6,635 square metres (71,420 sq ft) of total area. It has exits to Rua Professor Marcondes Domingues and to Avenida Luís Dumont Vilares, this last one with access for people with disabilities. It also has a distribution mezzanine under the platforms, besides connection with an urban bus terminal.
