= Cachoeirinha (disambiguation) =

Cachoeirinha is a city in the Brazilian state of Rio Grande do Sul.

Cachoeirinha may also refer to:

- Cachoeirinha, Tocantins
- Cachoeirinha, Pernambuco
- Cachoeirinha River
- Cachoeirinha (district of São Paulo)
