= Pedreira (district of São Paulo) =

District of São Paulo, Brazil

Coordinates: 23.6958°S 46.638°W

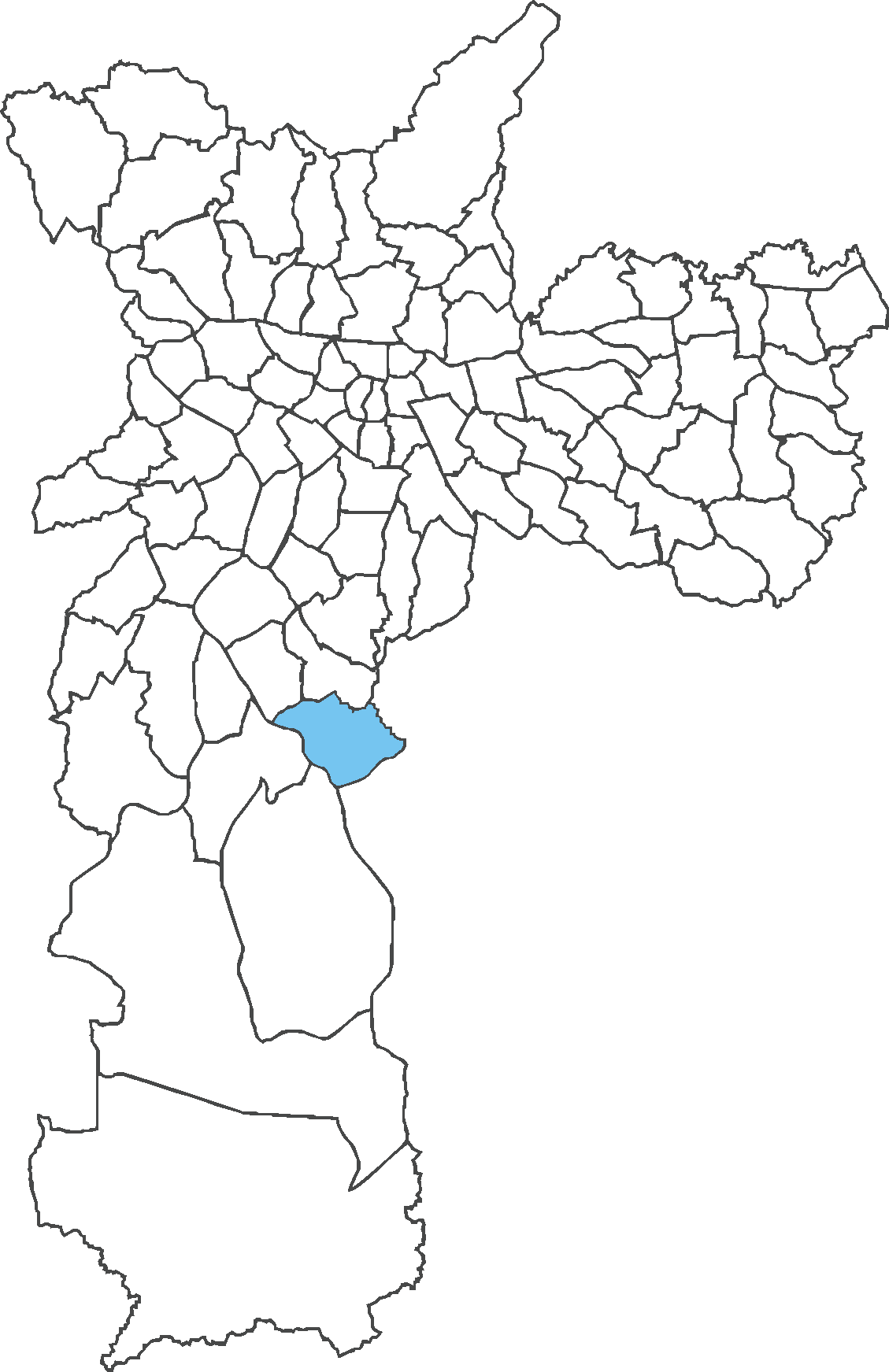
- District of the city of São Paulo
- Country: Brazil
- State: São Paulo
- Municipality: São Paulo
- Subprefecture: Cidade Ademar

Area
  - Total: 18.70 km^{2} (7.22 sq mi)

Population (2007)
  - Total: 144,317
  - Density: 7,717/km^{2} (19,990/sq mi)
- Website: Subprefecture of Cidade Ademar

Pedreira is one of 96 districts in the city of São Paulo, Brazil.

== See also ==
- Roman Catholic Diocese of Santo Amaro
