= Limão =

District of São Paulo, Brazil

Coordinates: 23.5083°S 46.6721°W

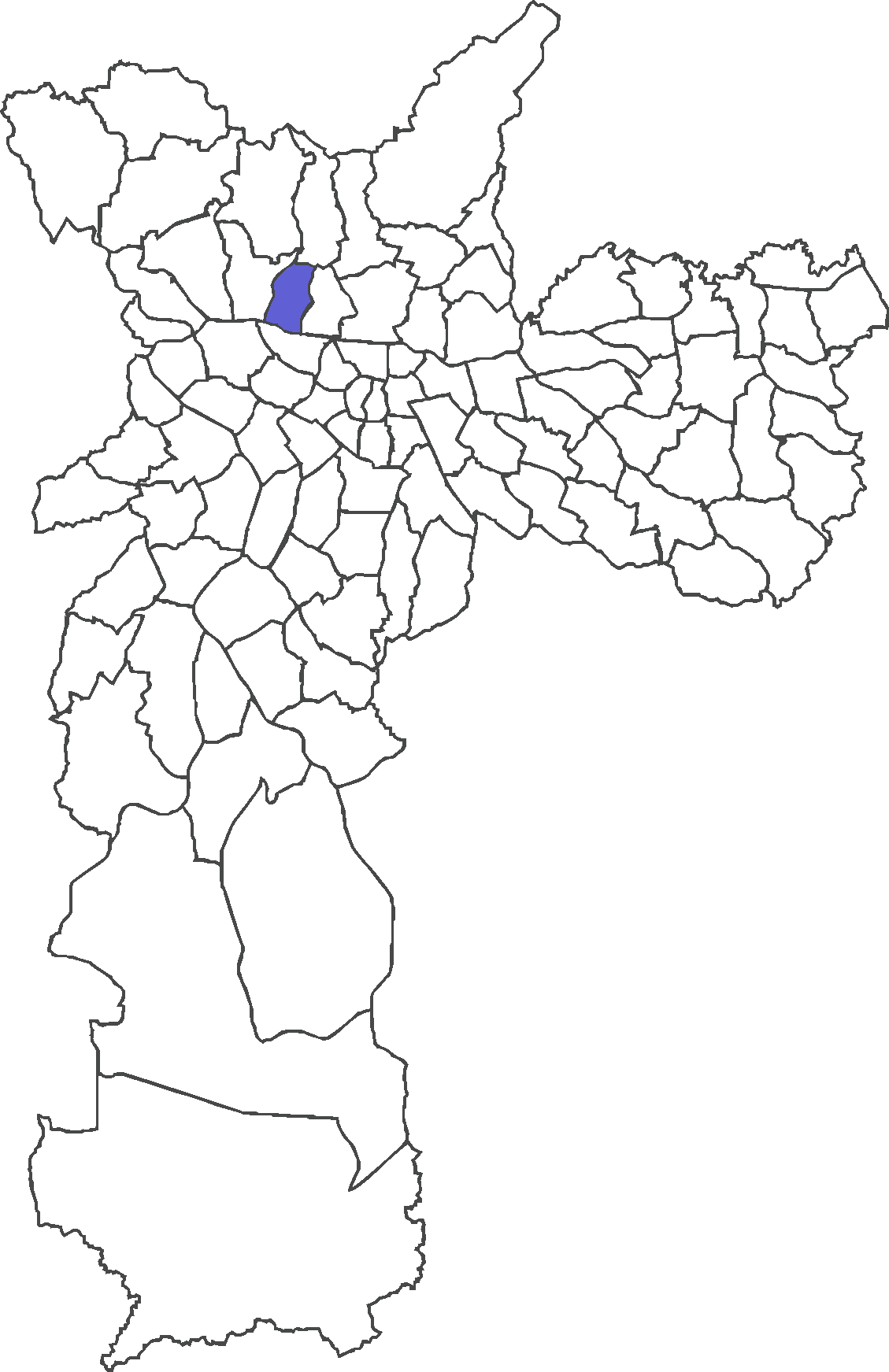
- District of the city of São Paulo
- Country: Brazil
- State: São Paulo
- Municipality: São Paulo
- Subprefecture: Casa Verde

Area
  - Total: 6.30 km^{2} (2.43 sq mi)

Population (2007)
  - Total: 80,229
  - Density: 12,735/km^{2} (32,980/sq mi)
- Website: Subprefecture of Casa Verde

Bairro do Limão is a neighborhood in the Limão district located in the northern part of the city of São Paulo, in the state of São Paulo, Brazil.

It is home to important companies in the state, as well as one of the current powerhouses of the São Paulo carnival, the Mocidade Alegre samba school.

Limão is one of 96 districts in the city of São Paulo, Brazil.
