= Sacomã =

District of São Paulo, Brazil

Coordinates: 23.6139°S 46.5973°W

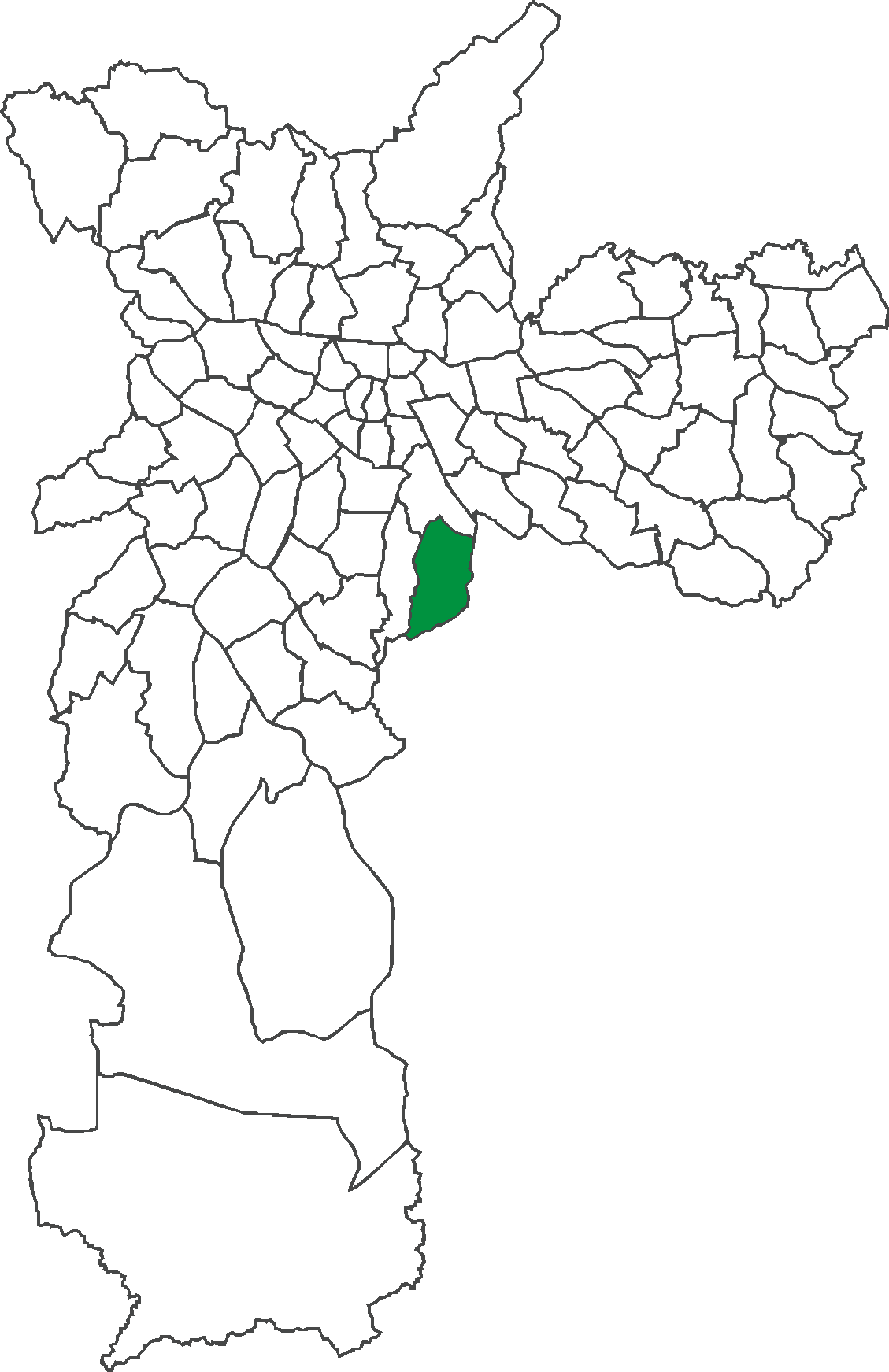
- District of the city of São Paulo
- Country: Brazil
- State: São Paulo
- Municipality: São Paulo
- Subprefecture: Ipiranga

Area
  - Total: 14.20 km^{2} (5.48 sq mi)

Population (2007)
  - Total: 247,851
  - Density: 17,454/km^{2} (45,210/sq mi)
- Website: Subprefecture of Ipiranga

Sacomã is one of 96 districts in the city of São Paulo, Brazil.

Sacomã is a district located in the southeast region of the municipality of São Paulo, in the state of São Paulo, Brazil. From a cultural and traditional point of view, the district of Sacomã is linked to the district of Ipiranga. The region traditionally called Sacomã corresponds to the commercial area located in the last blocks of Rua Silva Bueno, Rua Greenfeld, Rua Agostinho Gomes, Rua Manifesto and Rua Bom Pastor, where the Sacomã (Ipiranga) bus terminal is located.
