= Cachoeirinha (district of São Paulo) =

District of São Paulo, Brazil

Coordinates: 23.4789°S 46.6594°W

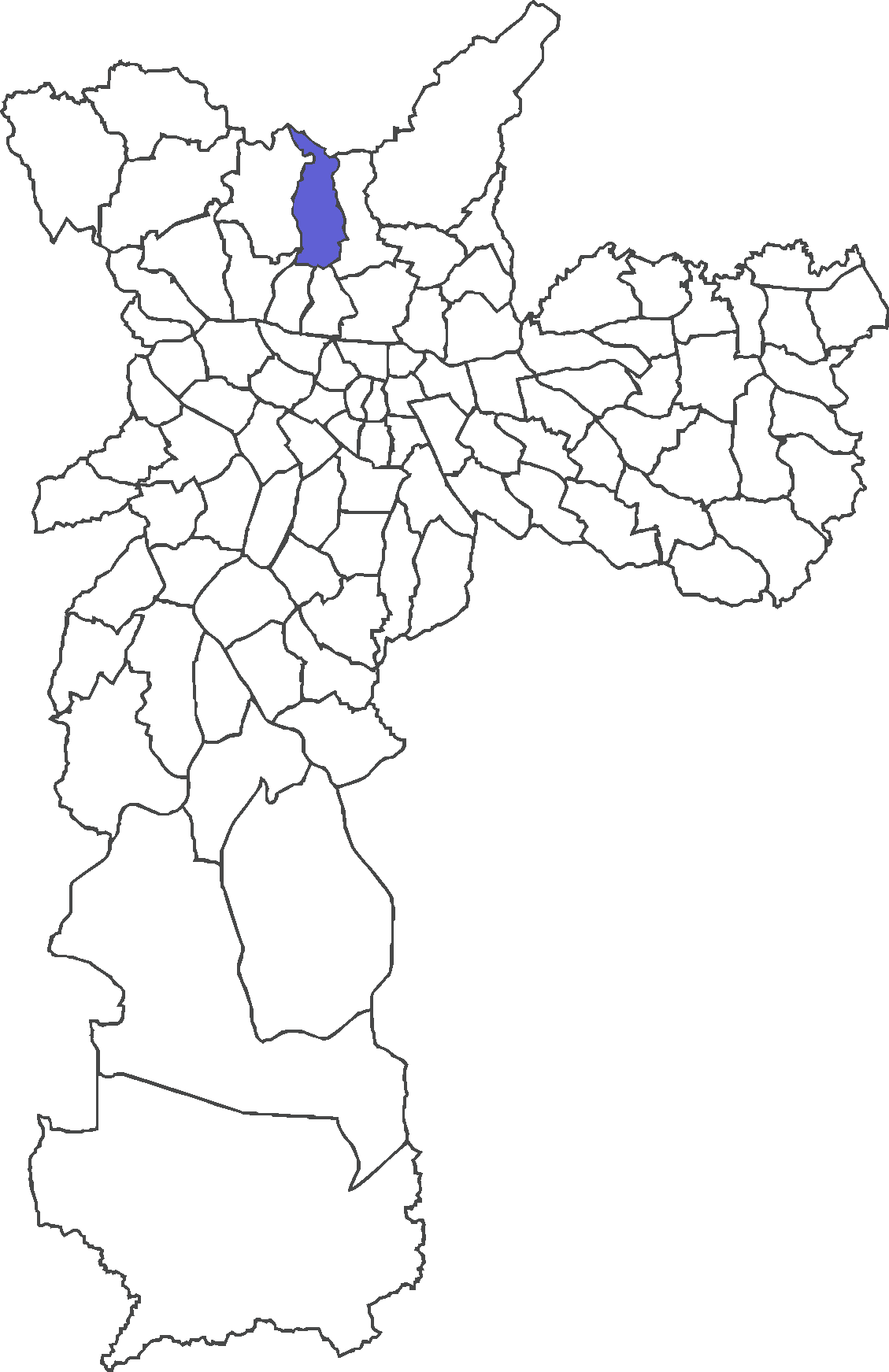
- District of the city of São Paulo
- Country: Brazil
- State: São Paulo
- Municipality: São Paulo
- Subprefecture: Casa Verde

Area
  - Total: 13.30 km^{2} (5.14 sq mi)

Population (2007)
  - Total: 143,523
  - Density: 10,791/km^{2} (27,950/sq mi)
- Website: Subprefecture of Casa Verde

Cachoeirinha is one of 96 districts in the city of São Paulo, Brazil.
