= São Bento (São Paulo Metro) =

São Paulo Metro station

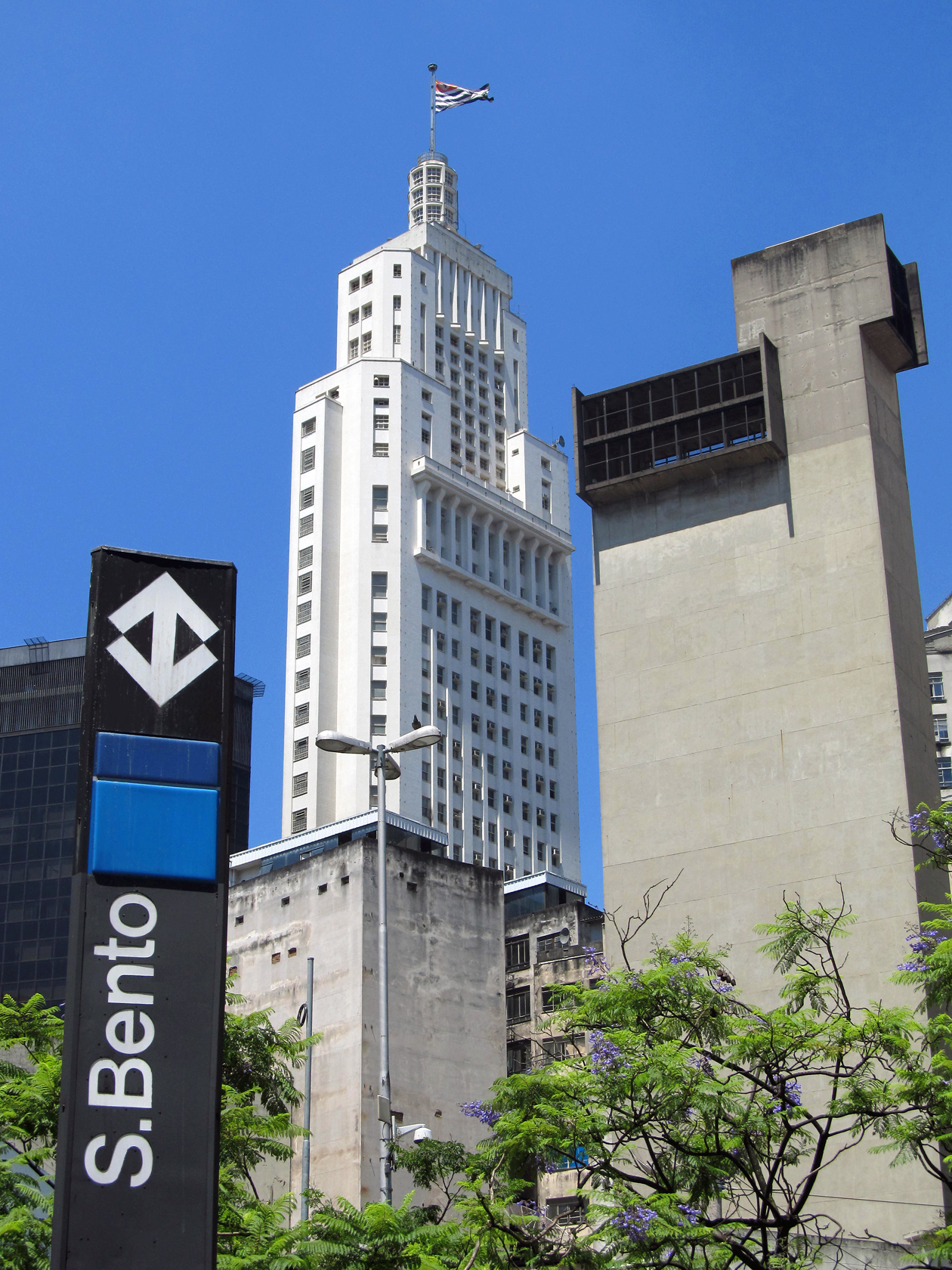
- Toten in the entrance of the station. Altino Arantes Building in the back.

General information
- Location: Largo São Bento, 109, Sé; São Paulo; Brazil
- Coordinates: 23°32′38″S 46°38′02″W
- Owner: Government of the State of São Paulo
- Operator: Companhia do Metropolitano de São Paulo
- Platforms: Split platforms

Construction
- Structure type: Underground
- Accessible: Yes

Other information
- Station code: BTO

History
- Opened: 26 September 1975

Passengers
- 51,000/business day

Services
Preceding station	São Paulo Metro	Following station
Luz towards Tucuruvi	Line 1	Sé towards Jabaquara
Future services
Anhangabaú Terminus	Line 19 (planned)	Cerealista towards Bosque Maia
Location

São Bento is a metro station on São Paulo Metro Line 1-Blue, located in the district of Sé, in São Paulo. The station was opened on 26 September 1975. It will be connected, in the future, according to the State Secretariat of Metropolitan Transports of São Paulo, with Line 19-Sky Blue (Anhangabaú↔Bosque Maia).

== Characteristics ==
Buried station with connection mezzanine, two split platforms and structure in apparent concrete. It has built area of 18,150 square metres (195,400 sq ft) and capacity for 40,000 passengers per hour during peak hours.

== Station average demand ==
The average entrance of passengers in the station is of 73,000 passengers per day, according to Metro data. It is situated in a very crowded region, in Rua Boa Vista, and close to the region of Rua 25 de Março, besides being located next to SPTrans Correio Bus Terminal.
