= Subprefecture of Jaçanã-Tremembé =

Coordinates: 23°27′57″S 46°34′43″W

- Subprefecture
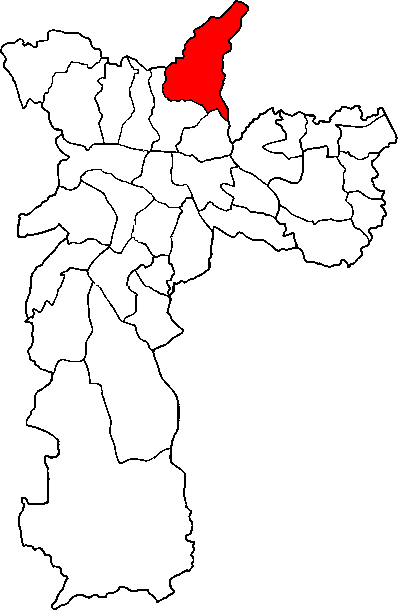
- Location of the Subprefecture of Jaçanã-Tremembé in São Paulo

- Location of municipality of São Paulo within the State of São Paulo
- Country: Brazil
- Region: Southeast
- State: São Paulo
- Municipality: São Paulo
- Administrative Zone: Northeast
- Districts: Jaçanã, Tremembé

Government
  - Type: Subprefecture
  - Subprefect: Izaul Segalla Júnior

Area
  - Total: 64.9 km^{2} (25.1 sq mi)

Population (2008)
  - Total: 276,628
- Website: Subprefeitura Jaçanã-Tremembé (Portuguese)

The Subprefecture of Jaçanã-Tremembé is one of 32 subprefectures of the city of São Paulo, Brazil. It comprises two districts: Jaçanã and Tremembé. It's the northernmost subprefecture and largely covered by parts of the Atlantic Forest.
