= Baruel Mansion =

Mansion built in the 19th century

- Palacete Baruel
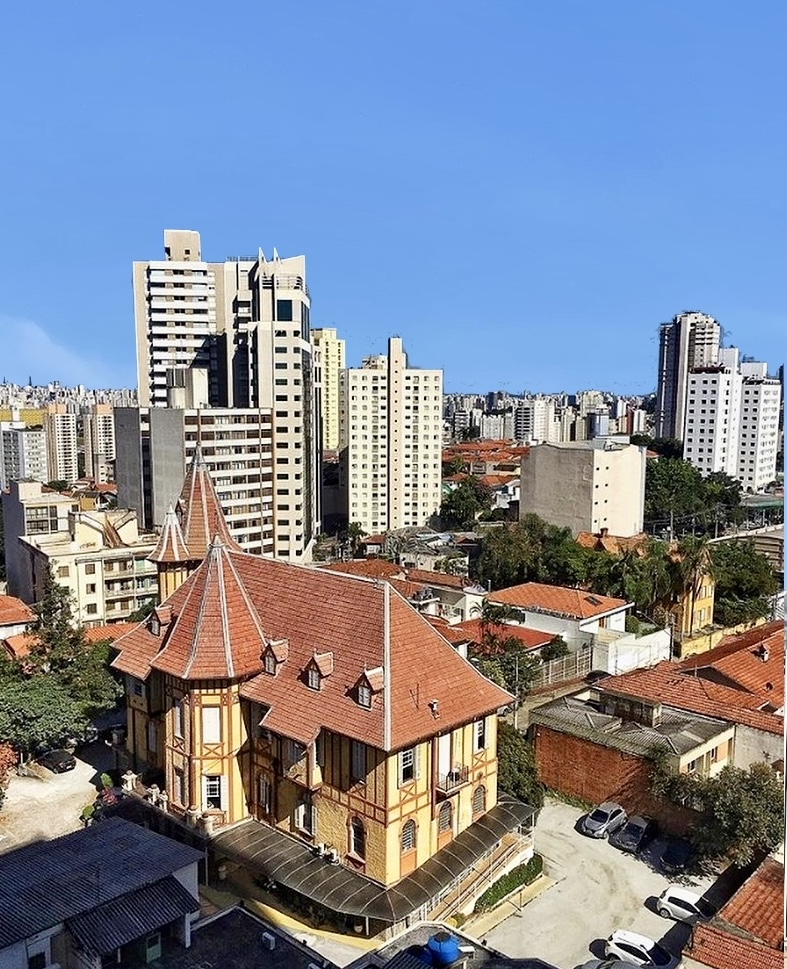
- Interactive map of the Baruel Mansion area

General information
- Type: Mansion
- Location: Alto de Santana - São Paulo, SP; Brazil, 2677 Voluntários da Pátria street
- Coordinates: 23°29′48″S 46°37′35″W
- Construction started: 19th century (finished in 1879)
- Owner: Clínica de Fraturas ZN

Baruel Mansion (Portuguese: Palacete Baruel) is a mansion built in the 19th century, located in Alto de Santana, northern area of São Paulo city.

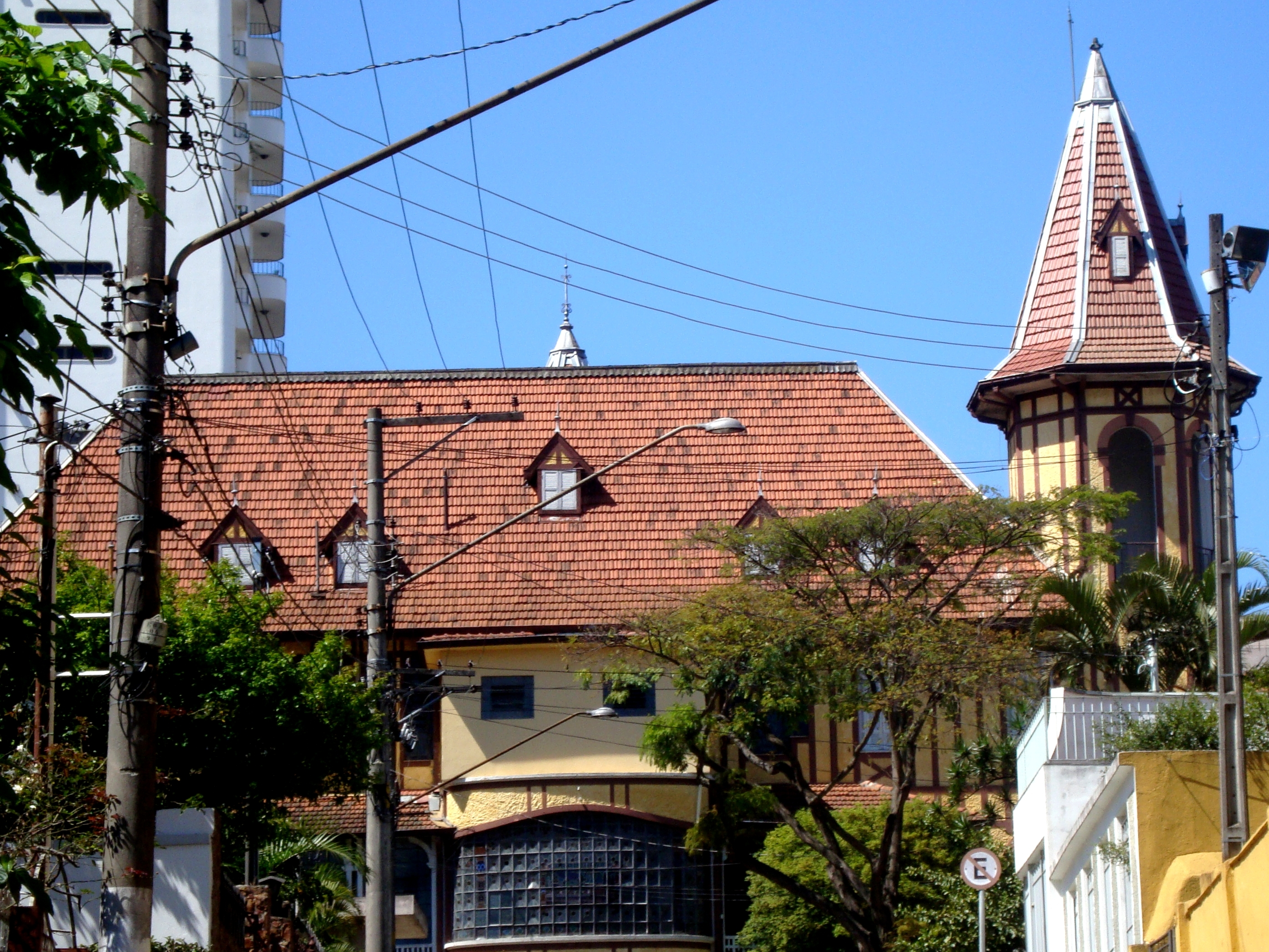

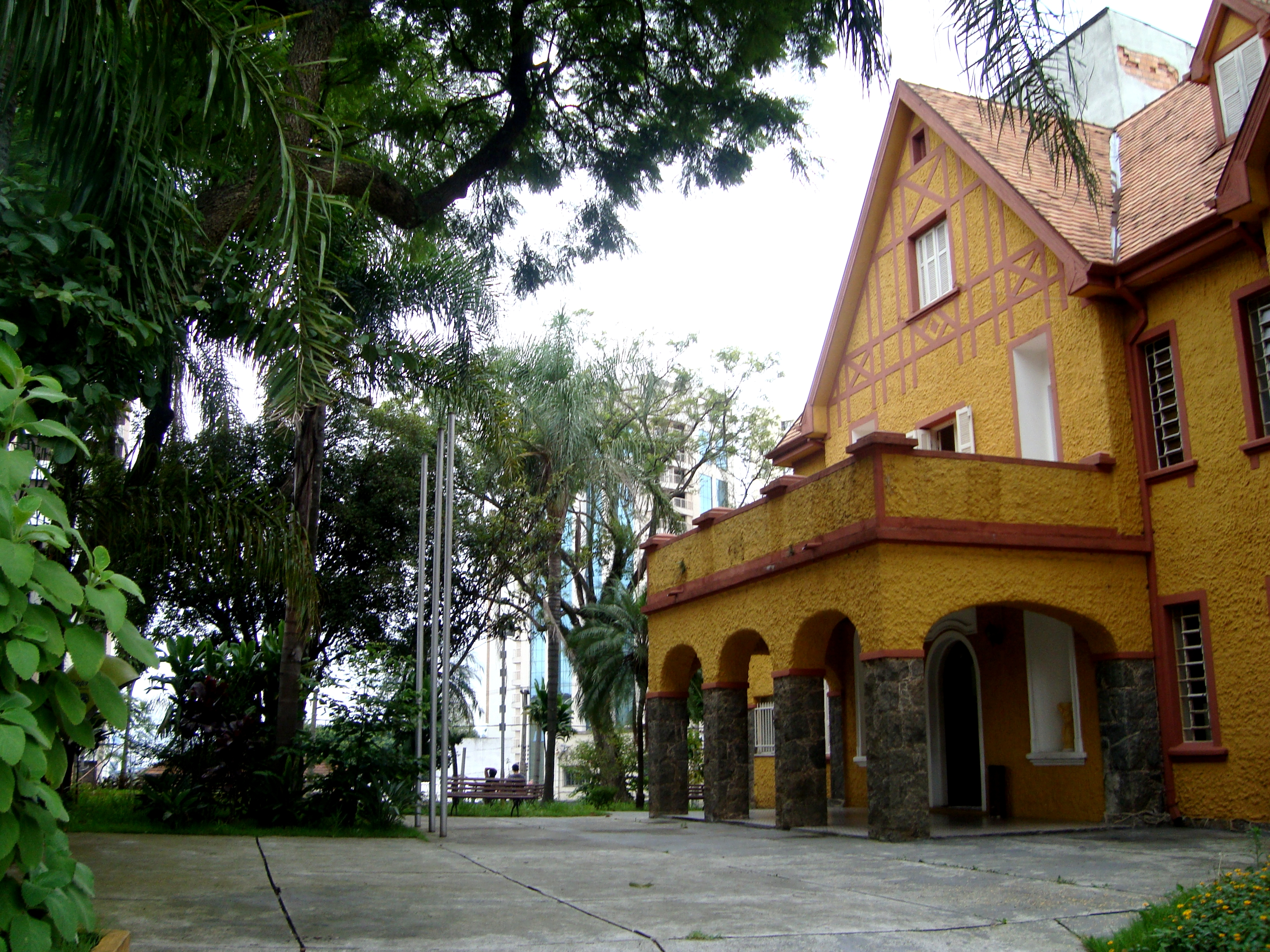
House of Dona Maria, the current Narbal Fontes Library.

The construction had been the headquarters of the Baruel estate, a farm where rice, beans, corn and sugarcane were grown with slave labour. The wealth of the owner is perceived in the buildings that make up the area.

The estate was 24,250 square metres (261,000 ft^{2}) in area, and after the death of Mr. Baruel the property was divided and sold in lots. The farm included the house of Dona Maria, daughter of Mr. Baruel, built in 1925, which today houses the Narbal Fontes Library.

The Baruel were a traditional and influential family of Santana. Near the farm, in the current Voluntários da Pátria street is located in the Chapel of Santa Cruz, built in 1895 by Pedro Doll and the Baruel family.

Built in the Norman style, the mansion is considered a historic site, it saves time and remnants of the neighbourhood. It has never been inhabited. Currently the building is a physiotherapy clinic.
