= Jardim São Paulo-Ayrton Senna (São Paulo Metro) =

São Paulo Metro station

Jardim São Paulo–Ayrton Senna
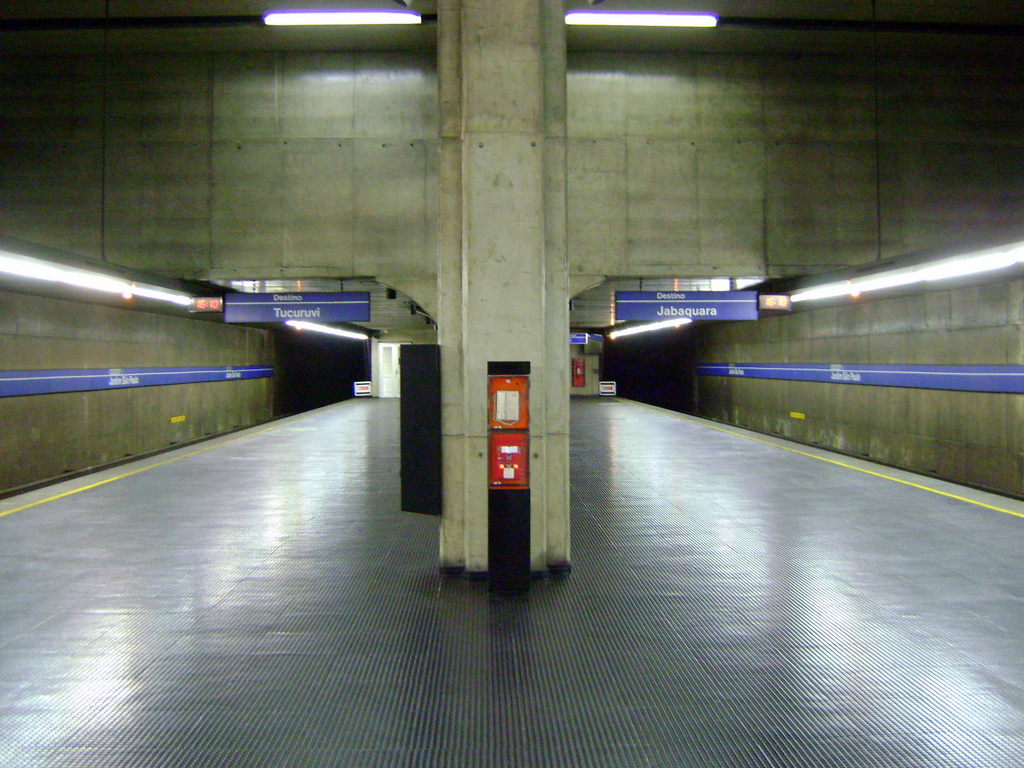

General information
- Location: Av. Leôncio de Magalhães, 1000, Santana; São Paulo; Brazil
- Coordinates: 23°29′33″S 46°37′02″W
- Owner: Government of the State of São Paulo
- Operator: Companhia do Metropolitano de São Paulo
- Platforms: Island platform

Construction
- Structure type: Underground
- Accessible: y

Other information
- Station code: JPA

History
- Opened: April 29, 1998
- Former names: Jardim São Paulo

Passengers
- 11,000/business day

Services
Preceding station	São Paulo Metro	Following station
Parada Inglesa towards Tucuruvi	Line 1	Santana towards Jabaquara
Location

Jardim São Paulo–Ayrton Senna, originally known only as Jardim São Paulo, is a metro station on São Paulo Metro Line 1-Blue, located in the district of Santana, in São Paulo. It was opened by Governor Mário Covas on 29 April 1998, along with stations Tucuruvi and Parada Inglesa, in the Line 1 north expansion project, initiated in 1996.

== Characteristics ==
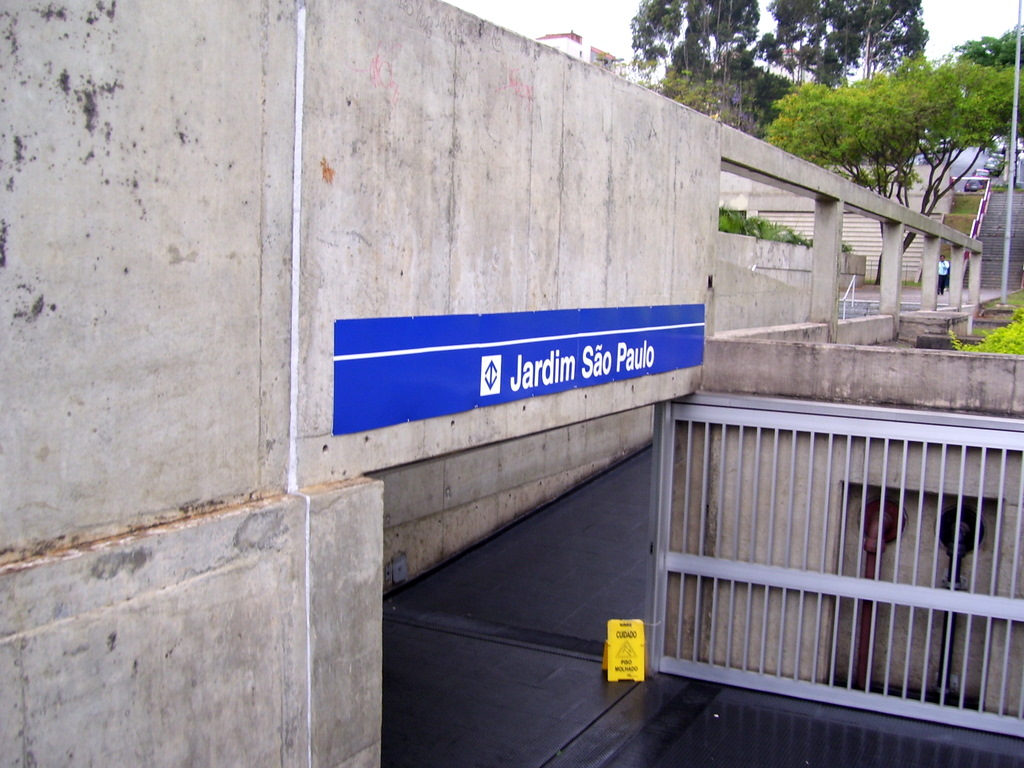
Entrance of the station

It is a buried station with an apparent concrete structure and island platform located under the distribution mezzanine. It has openings for natural lighting in the ambient of the platform and a different landscaping project, with the presence of gardens on the level of the lobby, where the tickets offices and the gates are. The project of the station gave to the architect Meire Gonçalves Selli an award in the 2nd Iberoamerican Architecture and Civile Engineering Biennal of Madrid in 2000.

It has 7,355 square metres (79,170 sq ft) of constructed area and capacity of 20,000 passengers per hour during the peak hours.

It has two exits, both located inside Domingos Luís Park and has access for people with disabilities.

== Renaming ==
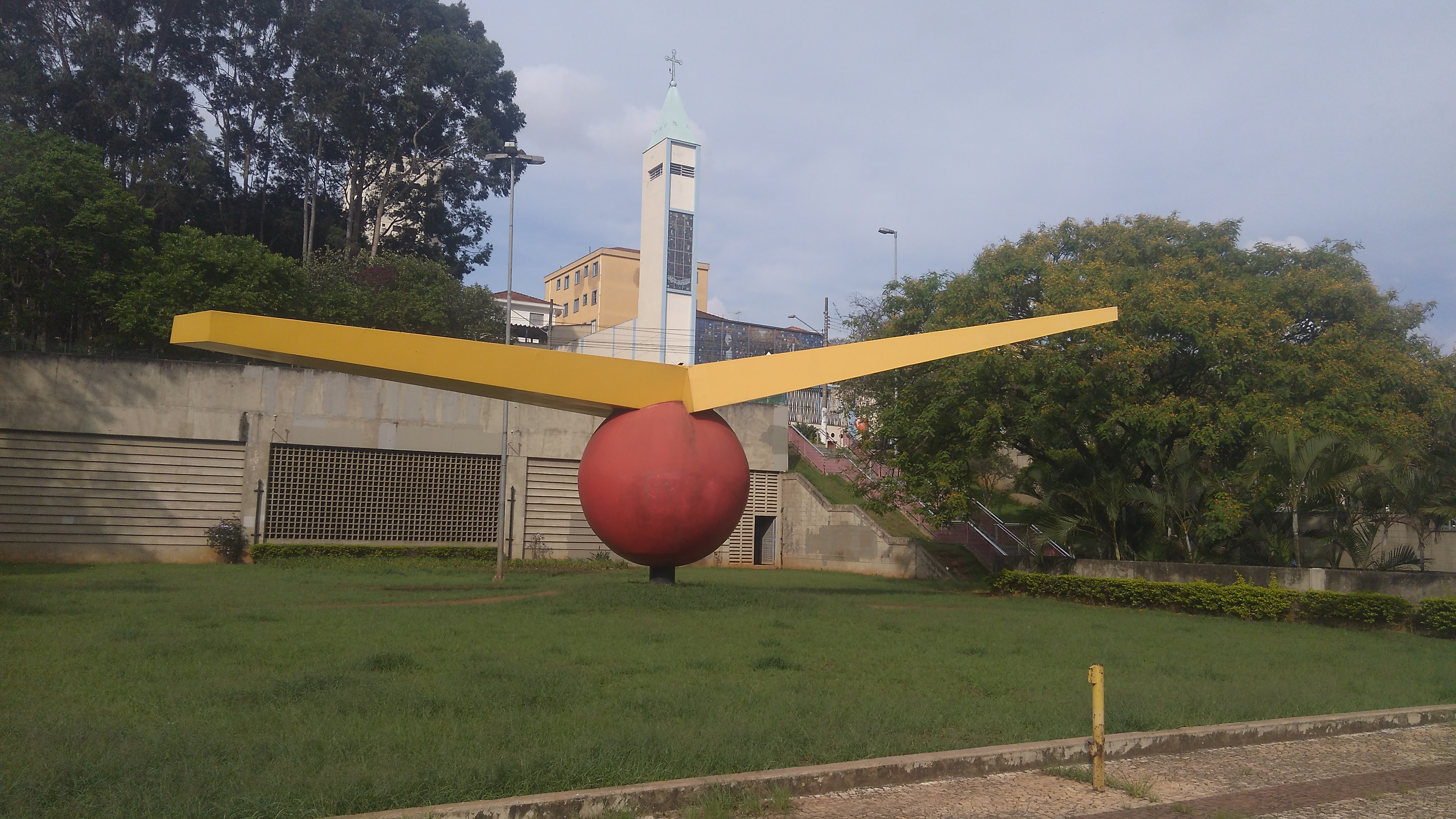
Vôo de Xangô, by Gilberto Salvador

In 2009, State Deputy Campos Machado (PTB), proposed a project for the renaming of the station from "Jardim São Paulo" to "Jardim São Paulo-Ayrton Senna". Senna, the legendary Formula 1 racing driver who was killed in a high-speed accident at the 1994 San Marino Grand Prix, was born and raised in the region of Jardim São Paulo. In 2011, the renaming was approved by the State Government, and such change was implemented since October of that year. The project went forward with much support from the public, including the collecting of many signatures for a petition. A sculpture as a tribute for the driver was installed in the location. The sculpture was made by the designer and plastic artist Paulo Soláriz, known by his sculpture-trophies and art aimed to motor racing and idealizer of the renaming project.
