= Cidade Ademar (district of São Paulo) =

District of São Paulo, Brazil

Coordinates: 23.6701°S 46.6574°W

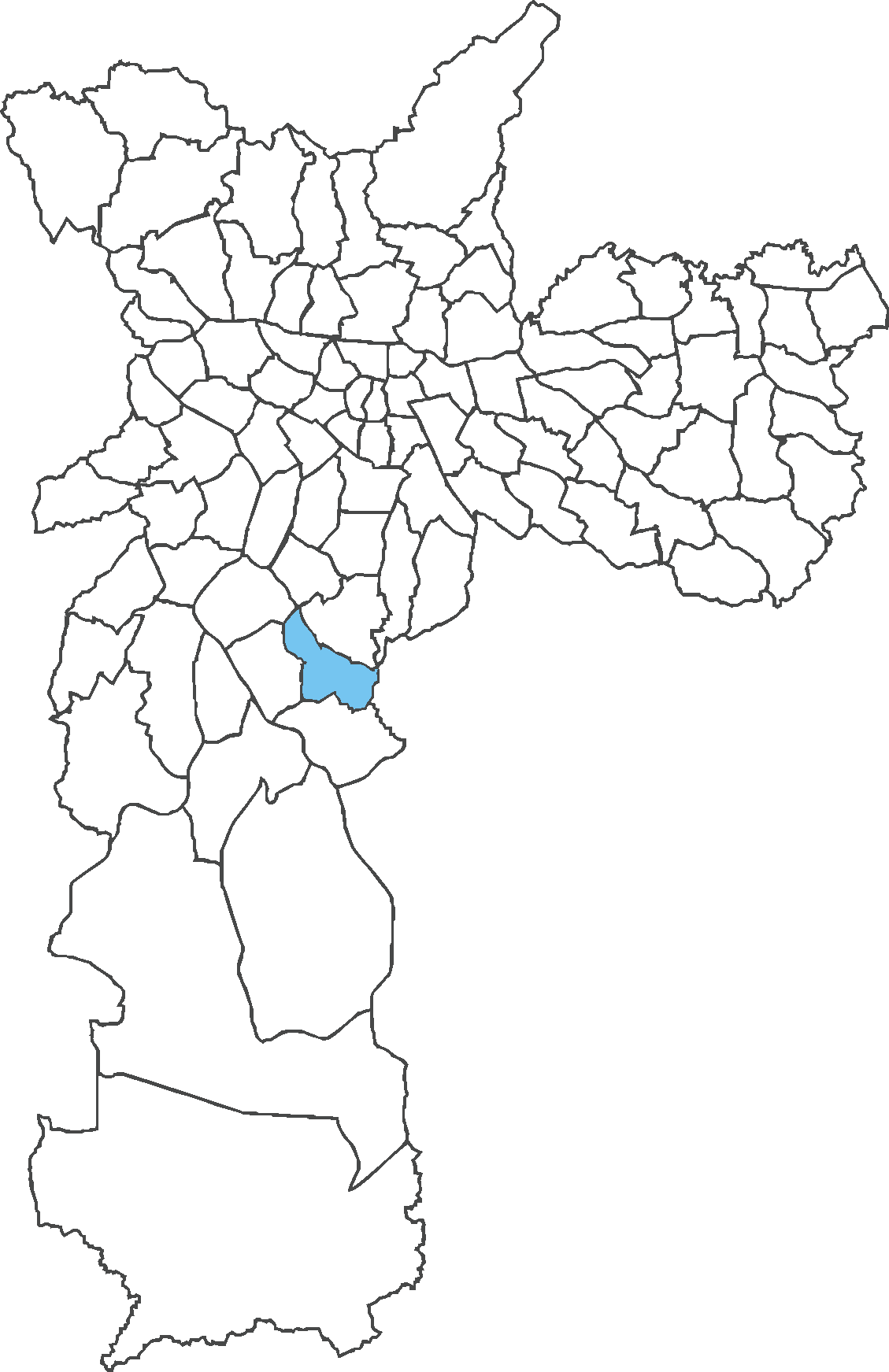
- District of the city of São Paulo
- Country: Brazil
- State: São Paulo
- Municipality: São Paulo
- Subprefecture: Cidade Ademar

Area
  - Total: 12.00 km^{2} (4.63 sq mi)

Population (2007)
  - Total: 266,681
  - Density: 22,223/km^{2} (57,560/sq mi)
- Website: Subprefecture of Cidade Ademar

Cidade Ademar is one of 96 districts in the city of São Paulo, Brazil.

== See also ==
- Roman Catholic Diocese of Santo Amaro
