= Casa Verde (district of São Paulo) =

District of São Paulo, Brazil

Coordinates: 23.511°S 46.657°W

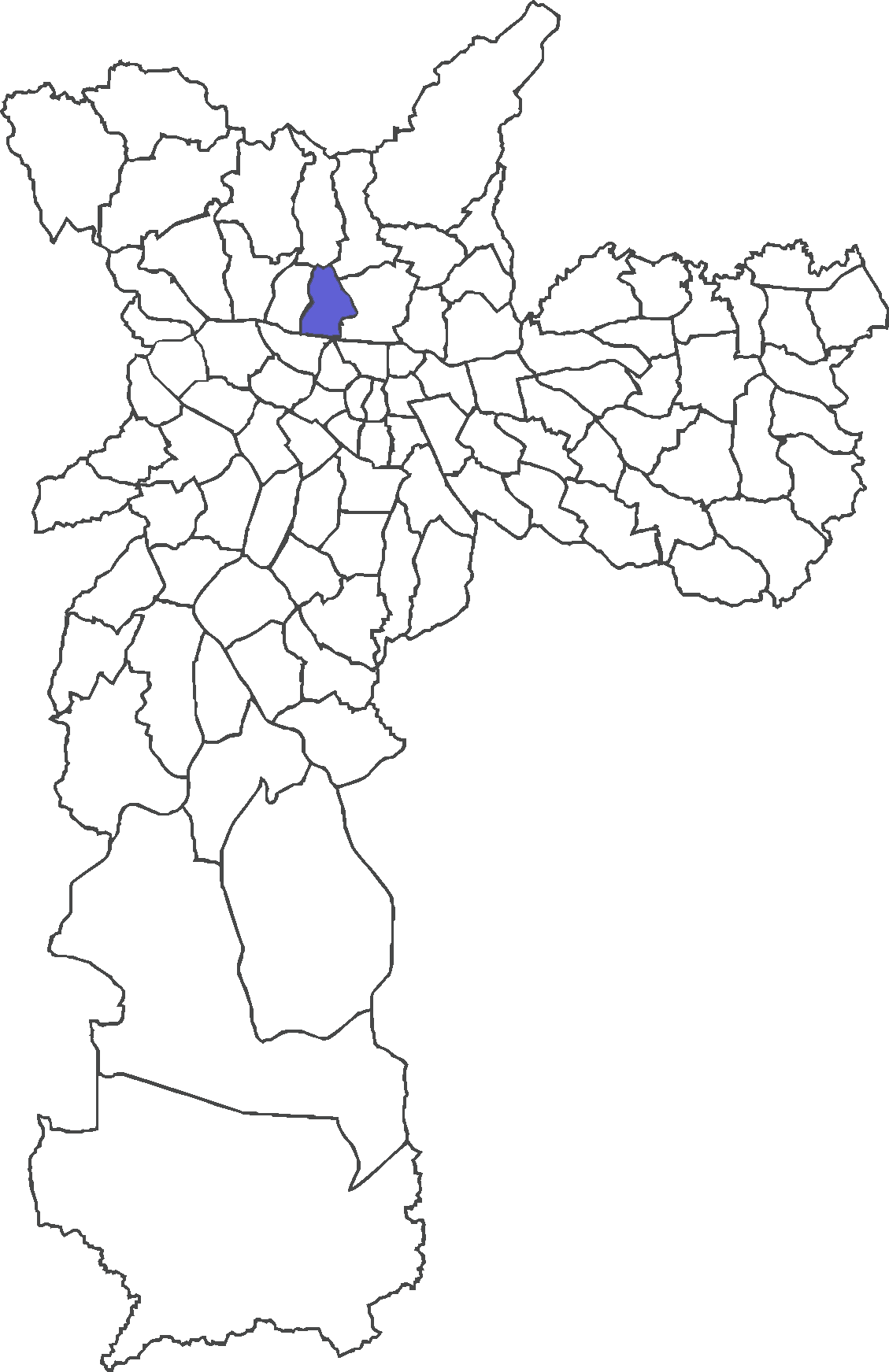
- District of the city of São Paulo
- Country: Brazil
- State: São Paulo
- Municipality: São Paulo
- Subprefecture: Casa Verde

Area
  - Total: 7.10 km^{2} (2.74 sq mi)

Population (2007)
  - Total: 85,624
  - Density: 12,060/km^{2} (31,200/sq mi)
- Website: Subprefecture of Casa Verde

Casa Verde is one of 96 districts in the city of São Paulo, Brazil.
