= Subprefecture of Ipiranga =

Coordinates: 23°35′25″S 46°36′28″W

- Subprefecture
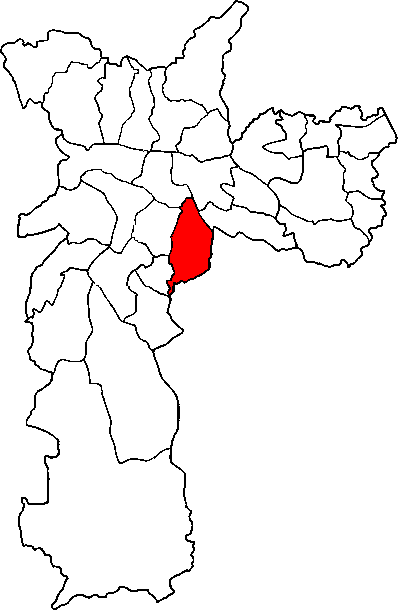
- Location of the Subprefecture of Ipiranga in São Paulo

- Location of municipality of São Paulo within the State of São Paulo
- Country: Brazil
- Region: Southeast
- State: São Paulo
- Municipality: São Paulo
- Administrative Zone: Southeast
- Districts: Ipiranga, Cursino, Sacomã

Government
  - Type: Subprefecture
  - Subprefect: Danilo Antão Fernandes

Area
  - Total: 37.65 km^{2} (14.54 sq mi)

Population (2008)
  - Total: 429,299
- Website: Subprefeitura Ipiranga (Portuguese)

The Subprefecture of Ipiranga is one of 32 subprefectures of the city of São Paulo, Brazil. It comprises three districts: Ipiranga, Cursino, and Sacomã. This subprefecture hosts the Ipiranga Museum and the Parque da Independência, where the independence of Brazil was proclaimed.
