= Mandaqui =

District of São Paulo, Brazil

Coordinates: 23°28′06″S 46°38′28″W

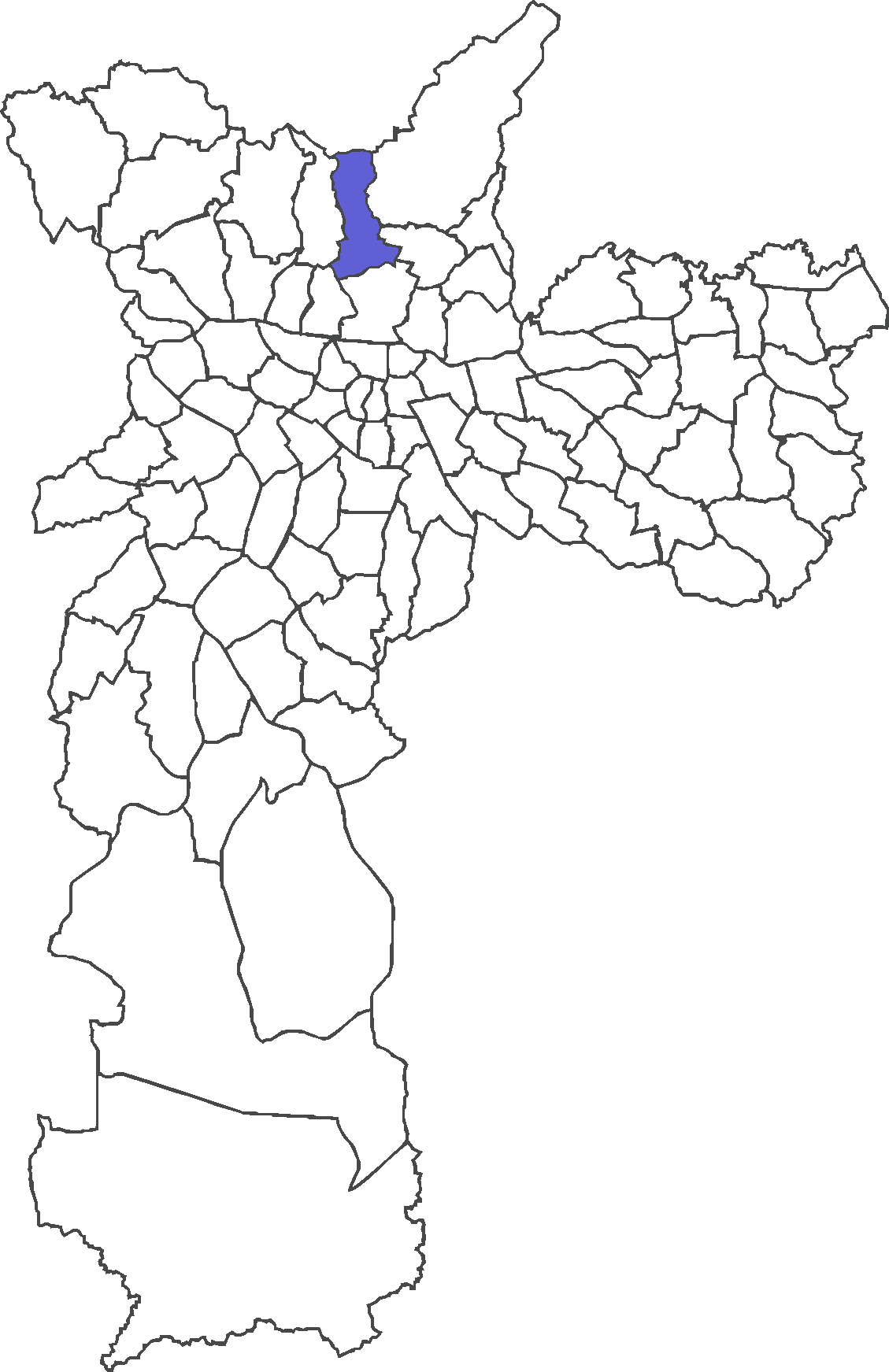
- Location in the city of São Paulo

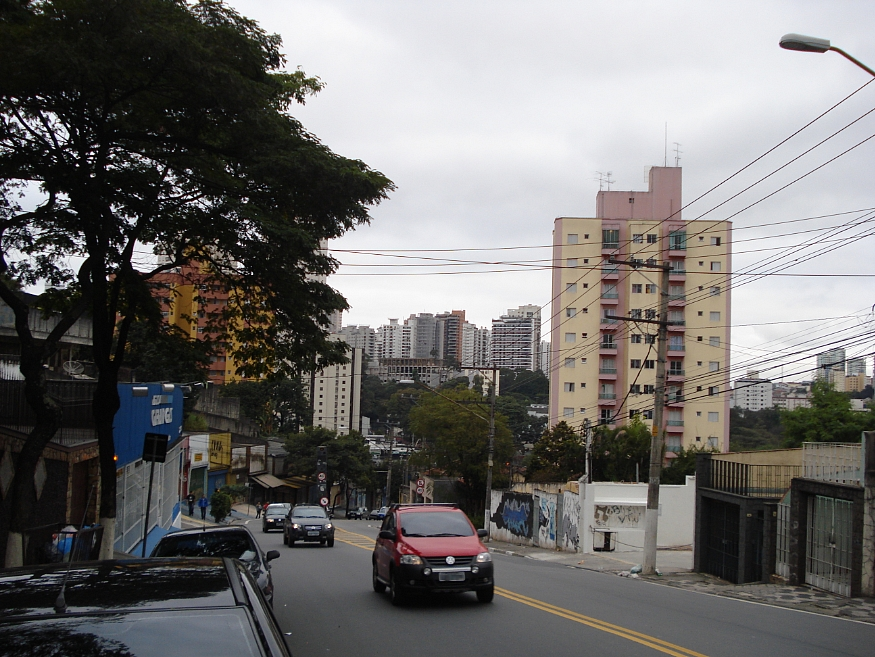
- Voluntários da Pátria street
- Country: Brazil
- State: São Paulo
- City: São Paulo

Government
  - Type: Subprefecture
  - Subprefect: Helio Rubens Gonçalves Figueiredo

Area
  - Total: 12.6 km^{2} (4.9 sq mi)

Population (2000)
  - Total: 103.113
- HDI: 0.885 –high
- Website: Subprefecture of Santana

Mandaqui is a district in the city of São Paulo, Brazil. Its official day is October 6th, along with the neighborhood of the same name. It is home to part of the Serra da Cantareira and the Cantareira Park, one of the largest native urban forests in the world.

The neighborhoods in the Mandaqui district are: Vila Santo Antônio; Jardim Pícolo; Santa Terezinha Residential Complex; Mandaqui Park; Chácara do Encosto; Vila Vitória Mazzei; Vila Aurora; Jardim Paraíso; Jardim Vieira de Carvalho; Jardim Ormendina; Jardim Sônia; Jardim Santa Inês; Santo Antônio Residential Complex; Jardim Carlu; Vila Amélia; Vila Romero; Jardim Malba; Jardim Maninos; Vila Basiléa; Lauzane Paulista; Jardim Emília; Vila Santos; Jardim Flamingo; Cantareira Park; Pedra Branca; Jardim Itatinga; Much of the northernmost part of the district is occupied by the Serra da Cantareira, in addition to the Albert Löefgren State Park - Horto Florestal.
