= Subprefecture of Casa Verde =

Coordinates: 23°00′S 46°00′W

- Subprefecture
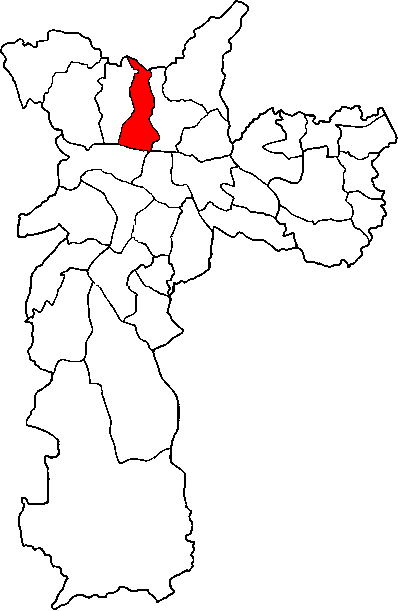
- Location of the Subprefecture of Casa Verde in São Paulo

- Location of municipality of São Paulo within the State of São Paulo
- Country: Brazil
- Region: Southeast
- State: São Paulo
- Municipality: São Paulo
- Administrative Zone: Northeast
- Districts: Casa Verde, Cachoeirinha, Limão

Government
  - Type: Subprefecture
  - Subprefect: Coronel Airton Nobre de Mello

Area
  - Total: 26.99 km^{2} (10.42 sq mi)

Population (2008)
  - Total: 313,026
- Website: Subprefeitura Casa Verde (Portuguese)

The Subprefecture of Casa Verde is one of 32 subprefectures of the city of São Paulo, Brazil. It comprises three districts: Casa Verde, Cachoeirinha, and Limão.
