= Subprefecture of Cidade Ademar =

Coordinates: 23°40′30″S 46°39′21″W

- Subprefecture
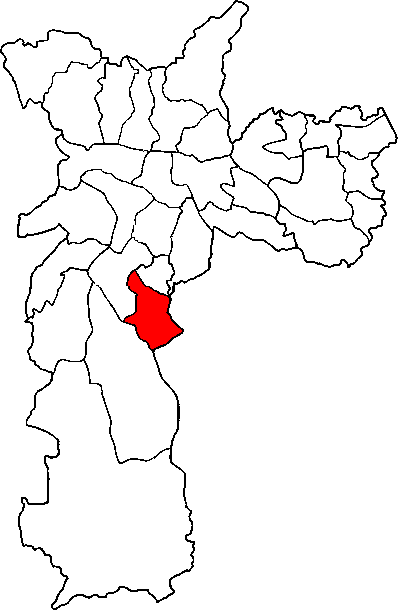
- Location of the Subprefecture of Cidade Ademar in São Paulo

- Location of municipality of São Paulo within the State of São Paulo
- Country: Brazil
- Region: Southeast
- State: São Paulo
- Municipality: São Paulo
- Administrative Zone: South
- Districts: Cidade Ademar, Pedreira

Government
  - Type: Subprefecture
  - Subprefect: Carlos Roberto Albertim

Area
  - Total: 30.6 km^{2} (11.8 sq mi)

Population (2005)
  - Total: 402,713
- Website: Subprefeitura Cidade Ademar (Portuguese)

The Subprefecture of Cidade Ademar is one of 32 subprefectures of the city of São Paulo, Brazil. It comprises two districts: Cidade Ademar and Pedreira.

== See also ==
- Roman Catholic Diocese of Santo Amaro
