= Tremembé (district of São Paulo) =

District of São Paulo, Brazil

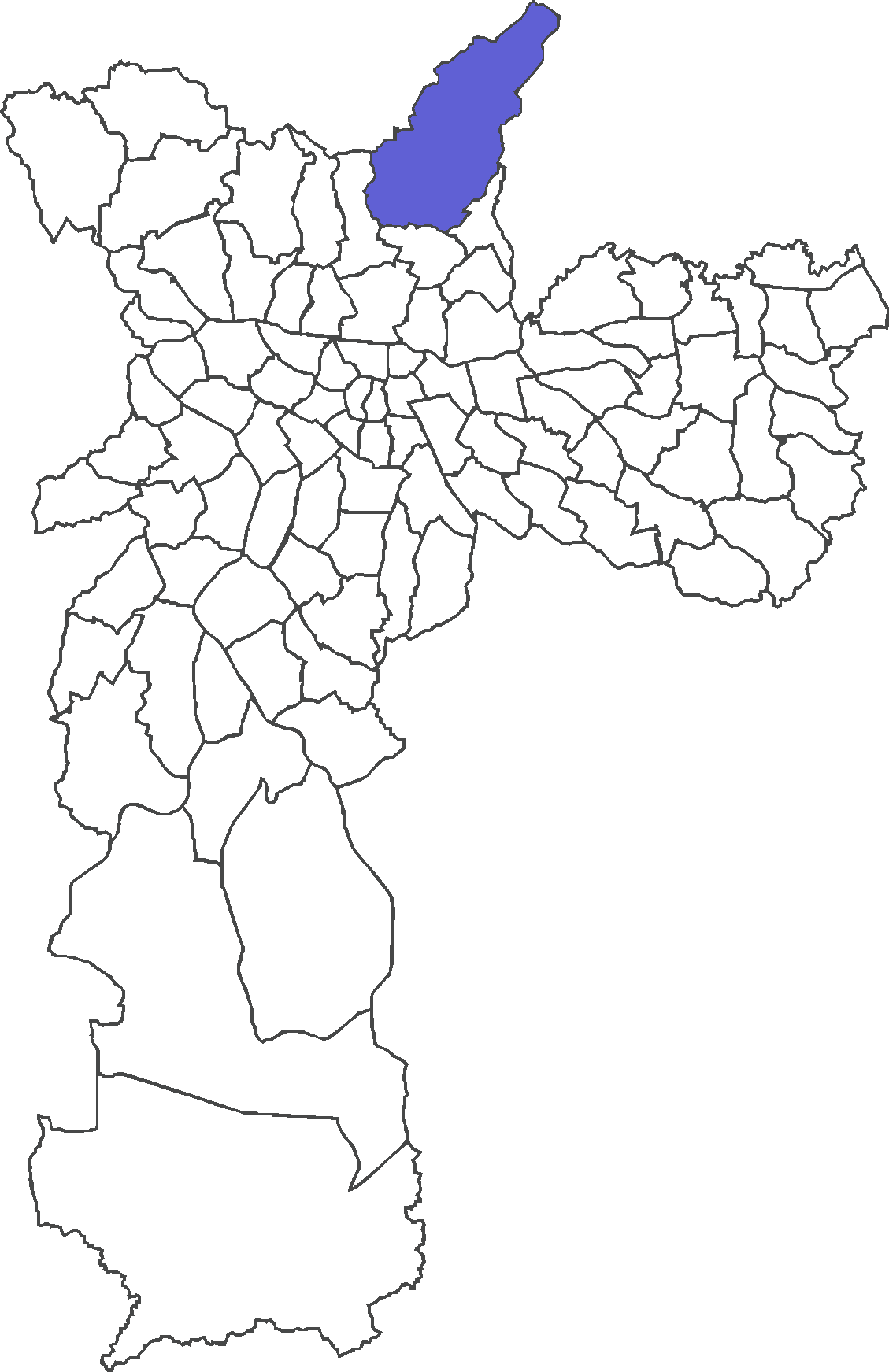
- Location in the city of São Paulo

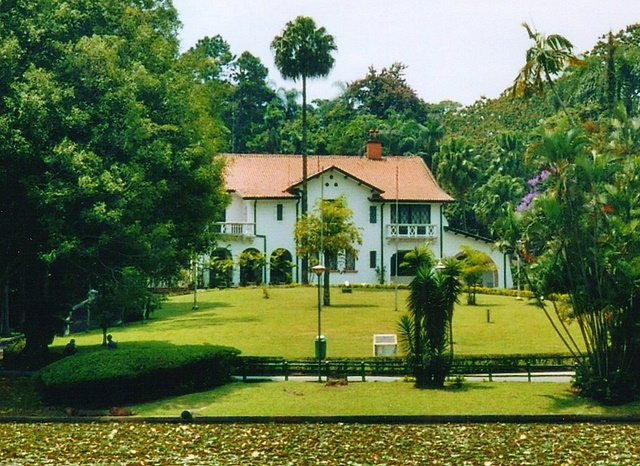
- Horto Florestal
- Country: Brazil
- State: São Paulo
- City: São Paulo

Government
  - Type: Subprefecture
  - Subprefect: Izaul Segalla Júnior

Area
  - Total: 56.3 km^{2} (21.7 sq mi)

Population (2000)
  - Total: 163.803
- HDI: 0.826 –high
- Website: Subprefecture of Jaçanã/Tremembé

Tremembé is the northernmost district in the city of São Paulo, Brazil. Tremembé borders the municipality of Mairiporã and encompasses part of the Serra da Cantareira

== Etymology ==
The name Tremembé or Tupi(Swampy) originates from an Indigenous group historically located in Brazil, known for their skills in swimming and warfare. The tribe was largely displaced due to colonization, but the name persists to the area's cultural roots.
