= Vila Maria =

District of São Paulo, Brazil

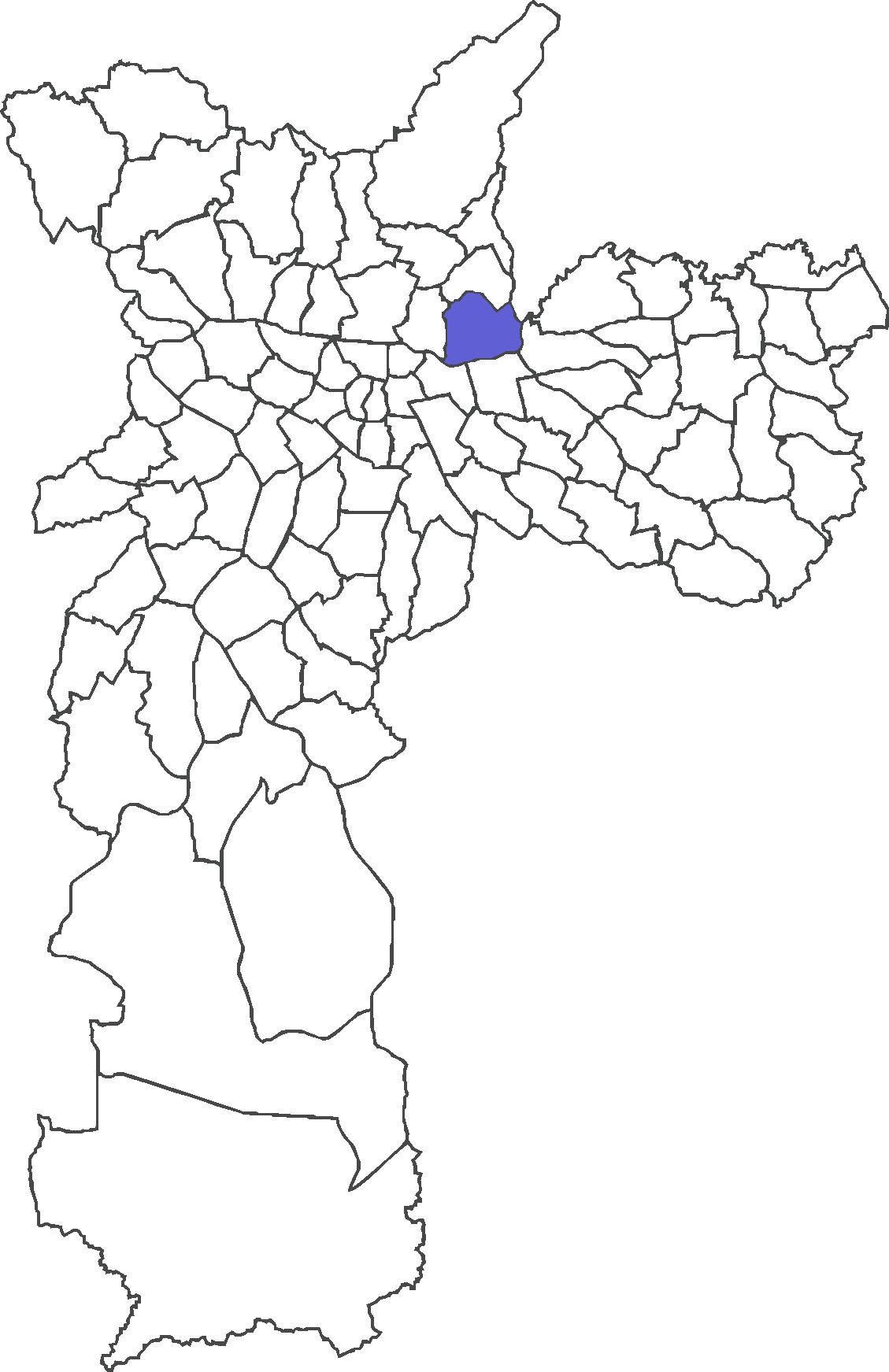
- Location in the city of São Paulo

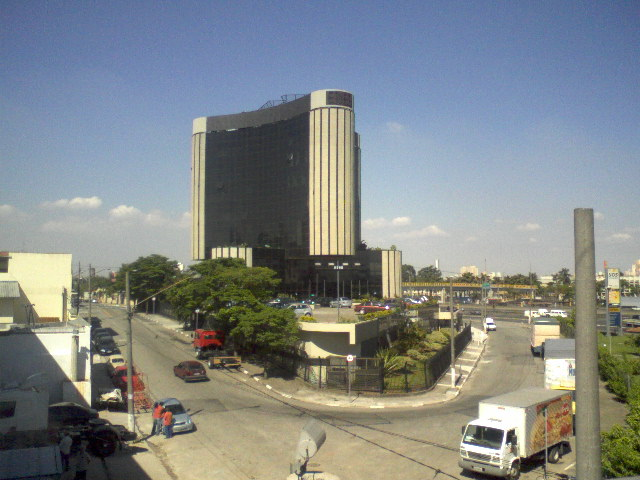
- TRC Palace
- Country: Brazil
- State: São Paulo
- City: São Paulo

Government
  - Type: Subprefecture
  - Subprefect: Antônio de Pádua Perosa

Population (2000)
  - Total: 113.845
  - Density: 9.527/km^{2} (24.67/sq mi)
- HDI: 0.824 –high
- Website: Subprefecture of Vila Maria

Vila Maria is a district located in the northern region of the city of São Paulo. A good part of the economy of the district comes from activities related to logistics and transportation of cargoes due to the large number of companies in the industry located in the region. The neighborhood is also famous for the samba school of the Unidos da Vila Maria.
