= Northeast Zone of São Paulo =

Coordinates: 23°28′53″S 46°37′36″W

Northeast Zone of São Paulo Zona Nordeste
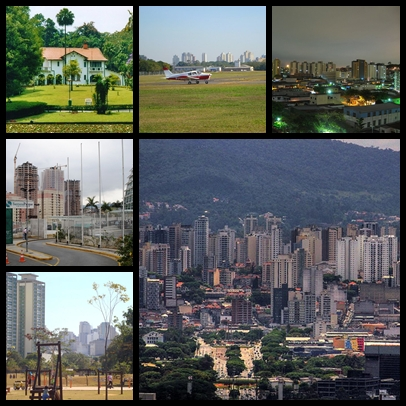

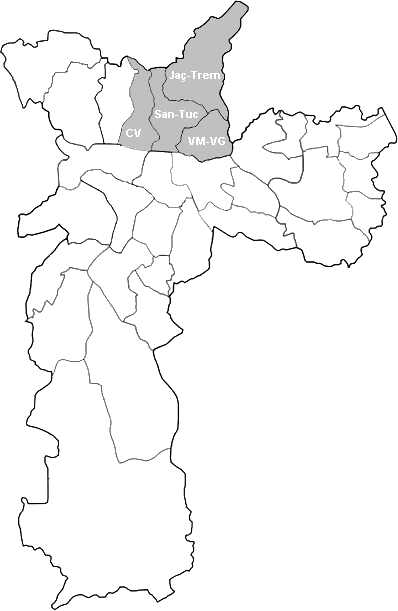
- Location of Northeast Zone of São Paulo
- Country: Brazil
- State: São Paulo
- City: São Paulo
- Subprefectures: Northeast Zone: Santana-Tucuruvi; Casa Verde; Vila Maria-Vila Guilherme; Jaçanã-Tremembé

The Northeast Zone is an Administrative Zone of São Paulo, Brazil.
