= Tucuruvi =

District of São Paulo, Brazil

Coordinates: 23°28′52″S 46°25′53″W

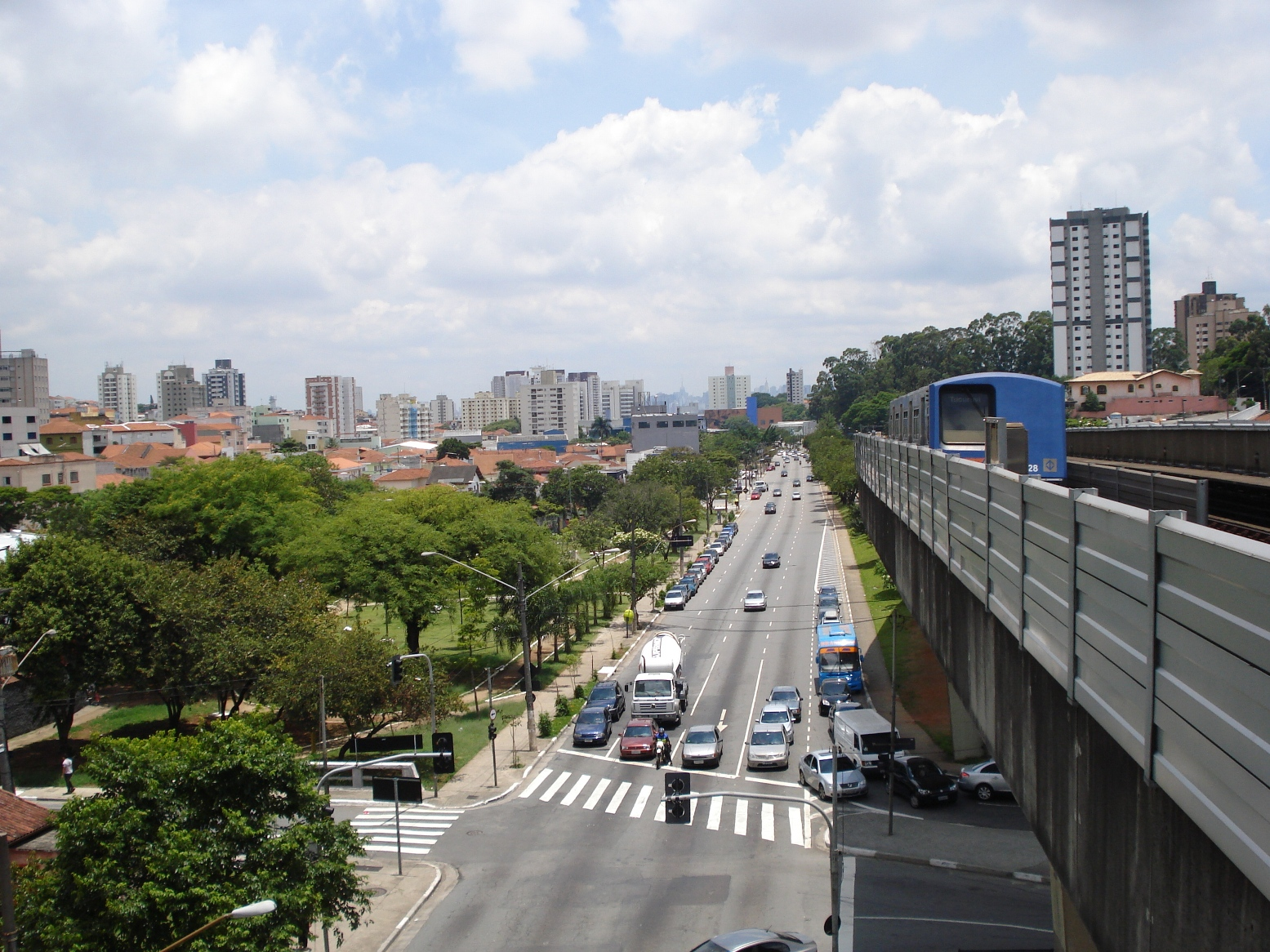
- Subway in Tucuruvi

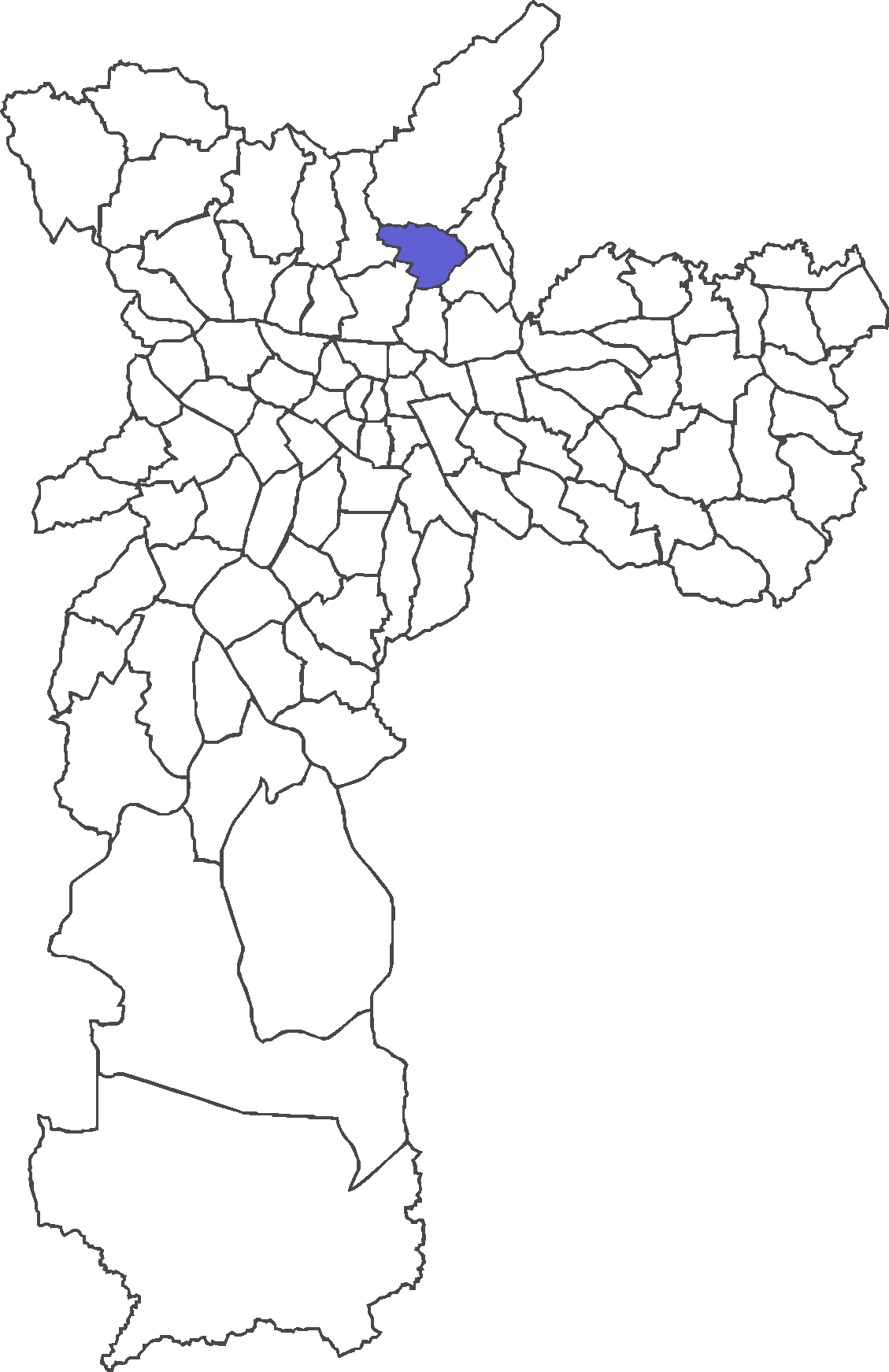
- Location in the city of São Paulo
- Country: Brazil
- State: São Paulo
- City: São Paulo

Government
  - Type: Subprefecture
  - Subprefect: Helio Rubens Gonçalves Figueiredo

Population (2000)
  - Total: 99.368
- HDI: 0.892 –high
- Website: Subprefecture of Santana

Tucuruvi is a district located in the North Zone of the municipality of São Paulo, Brazil.

== Etymology ==
The name "Tucuruvi" comes from the Tupi language and means "green grasshopper", through the combination of the terms tukura (grasshopper) and oby (green).

== Transportation ==
Tucuruvi is served by Tucuruvi Station on Line 1 (Blue) of the São Paulo Metro.
