= Vila Medeiros =

District of São Paulo, Brazil

Coordinates: 22°45′S 43°24′W

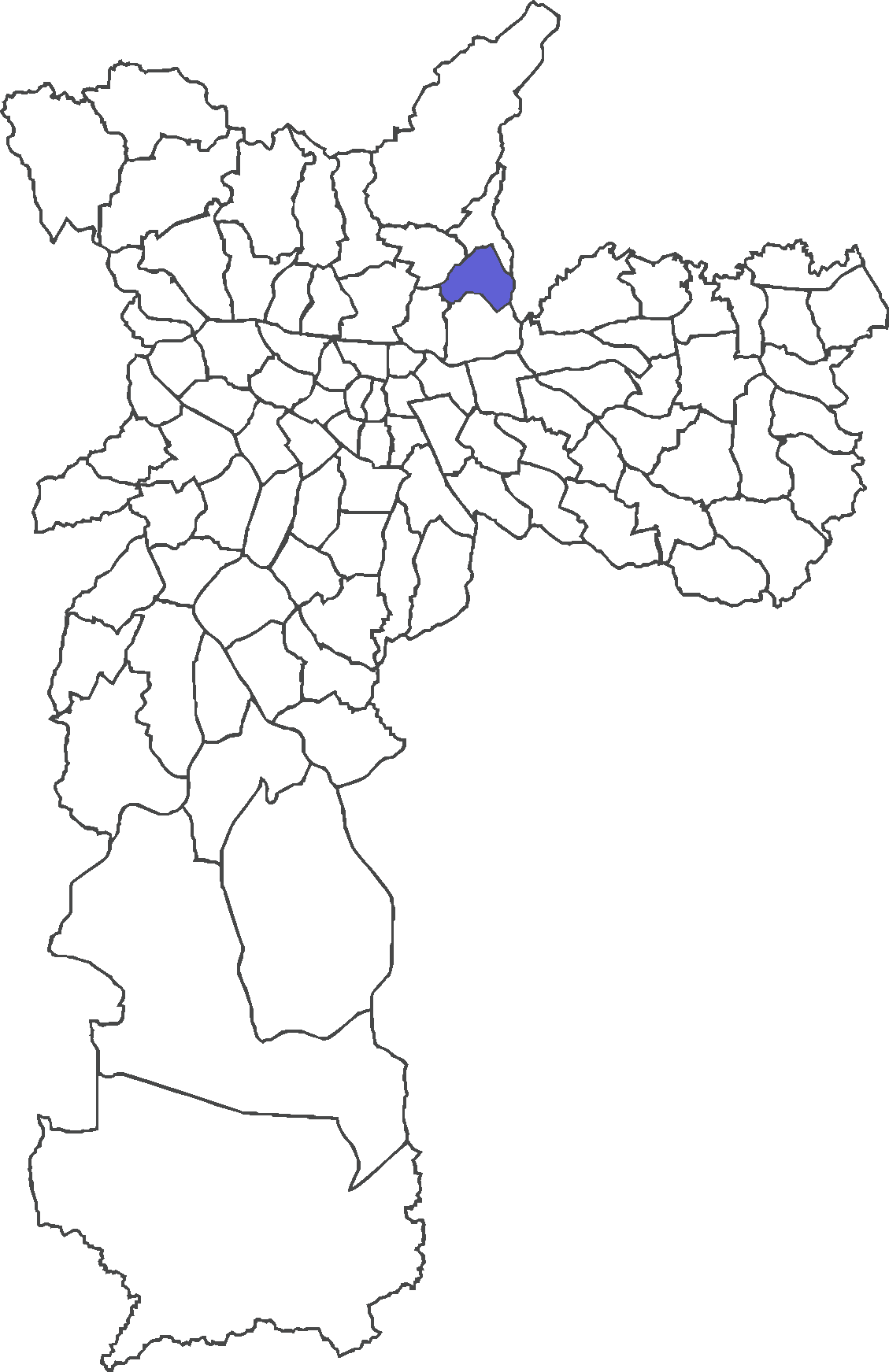
- Location in the city of São Paulo
- Country: Brazil
- State: São Paulo
- City: São Paulo

Government
  - Type: Subprefecture
  - Subprefect: Antônio de Pádua Perosa

Area
  - Total: 7.7 km^{2} (3.0 sq mi)

Population (2004)
  - Total: 49.984
- HDI: 0.836 –high
- Website: Subprefecture of Vila Maria

Vila Medeiros is a district located in the northeastern district of the city of São Paulo.
