= Subdivisions of São Paulo =

São Paulo in Brazil is a large metropolitan city that has several levels of subdivision. Administratively, the municipality is divided into 32 boroughs, each in turn divided into 96 wards (distritos, or districts). Locally, wards may contain one or more neighborhoods (bairros).

== Administrative zones ==
The subprefectures are officially grouped into nine regions (or "zones"), taking into account their geographical position and history of occupation. These regions are used only in technical and governmental agencies and are not identified by any visual communication in the city.

Administrative Zones of São Paulo
Map	Zone	Population	Area
Official Administrative Zones of São Paulo.		est. 2008	in km²
Official Administrative Zones of São Paulo.	Central	328,597	31
Official Administrative Zones of São Paulo.	Northwest	1,007,691	144
Official Administrative Zones of São Paulo.	Northeast	1,181,582	152
Official Administrative Zones of São Paulo.	East 1	1,212,099	140
Official Administrative Zones of São Paulo.	East 2	1,342,924	68,8
Official Administrative Zones of São Paulo.	Southeast	1,494,770	128
Official Administrative Zones of São Paulo.	South	2,346,913	607
Official Administrative Zones of São Paulo.	South-Central	715,910	74
Official Administrative Zones of São Paulo.	West	872,817	128
Official Administrative Zones of São Paulo.	City of São Paulo	10,940,311	1509
Official Administrative Zones of São Paulo.	Source:		

== Subprefectures ==
Boroughs in São Paulo are governed by subprefectures (from 2016 to 2018 named regional prefectures) created—at least in theory—to give more financial autonomy to local governments. There are 32 subprefectures.

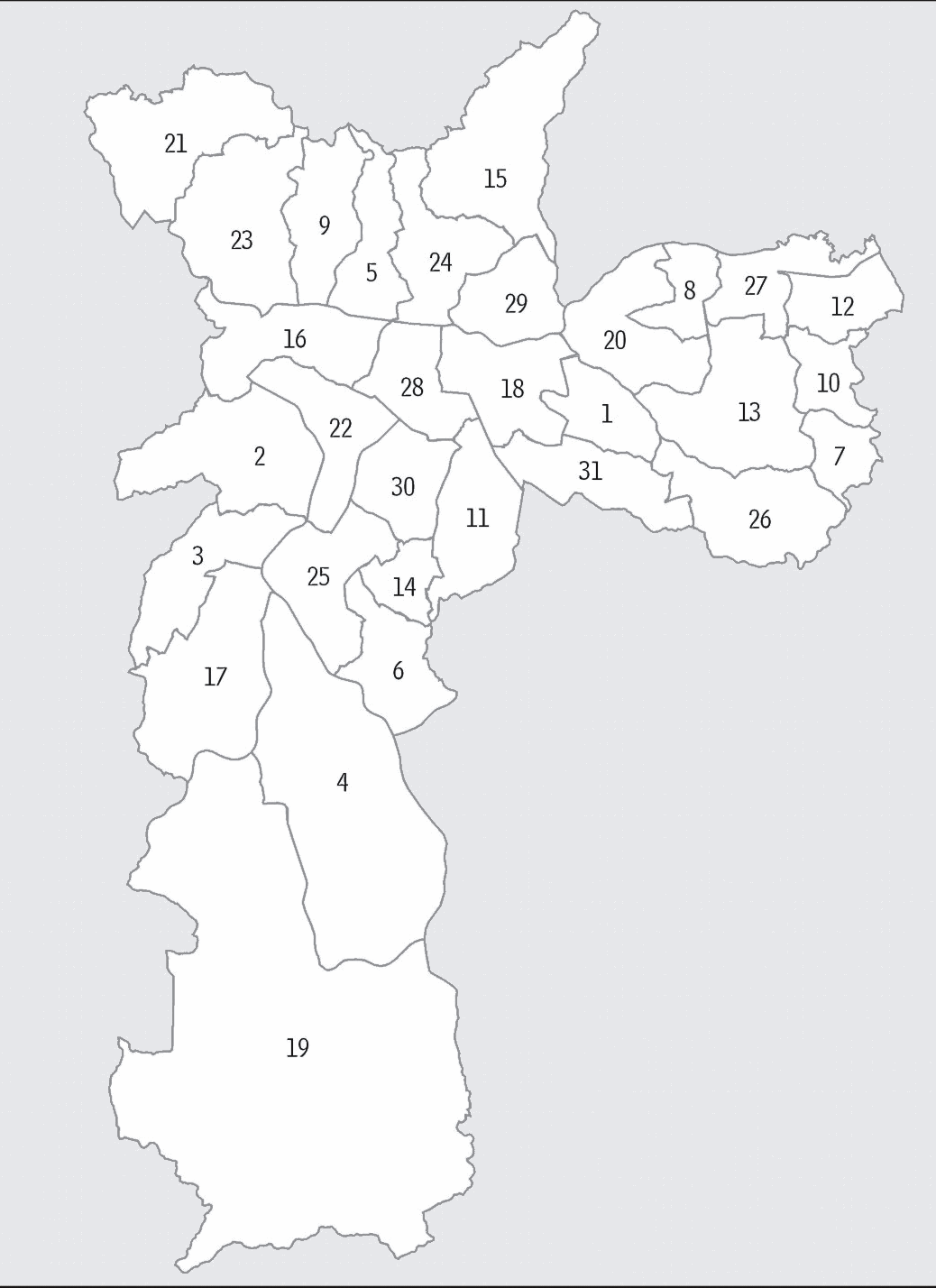
Subprefecture
1	Aricanduva	17	M'Boi Mirim
2	Butantã	18	Mooca
3	Campo Limpo	19	Parelheiros
4	Capela do Socorro	20	Penha
5	Casa Verde	21	Perus
6	Cidade Ademar	22	Pinheiros
7	Cidade Tiradentes	23	Pirituba-Jaraguá
8	Ermelino Matarazzo	24	Santana-Tucuruvi
9	Freguesia-Brasilândia	25	Santo Amaro
10	Guaianases	26	São Mateus
11	Ipiranga	27	São Miguel Paulista
12	Itaim Paulista	28	Sapopemba
13	Itaquera	29	Sé
14	Jabaquara	30	Vila Maria-Vila Guilherme
15	Jaçanã-Tremembé	31	Vila Mariana
16	Lapa	32	Vila Prudente

== Wards ==
Wards in São Paulo, called Distritos (districts), are subdivisions of the boroughs, without a self-government.

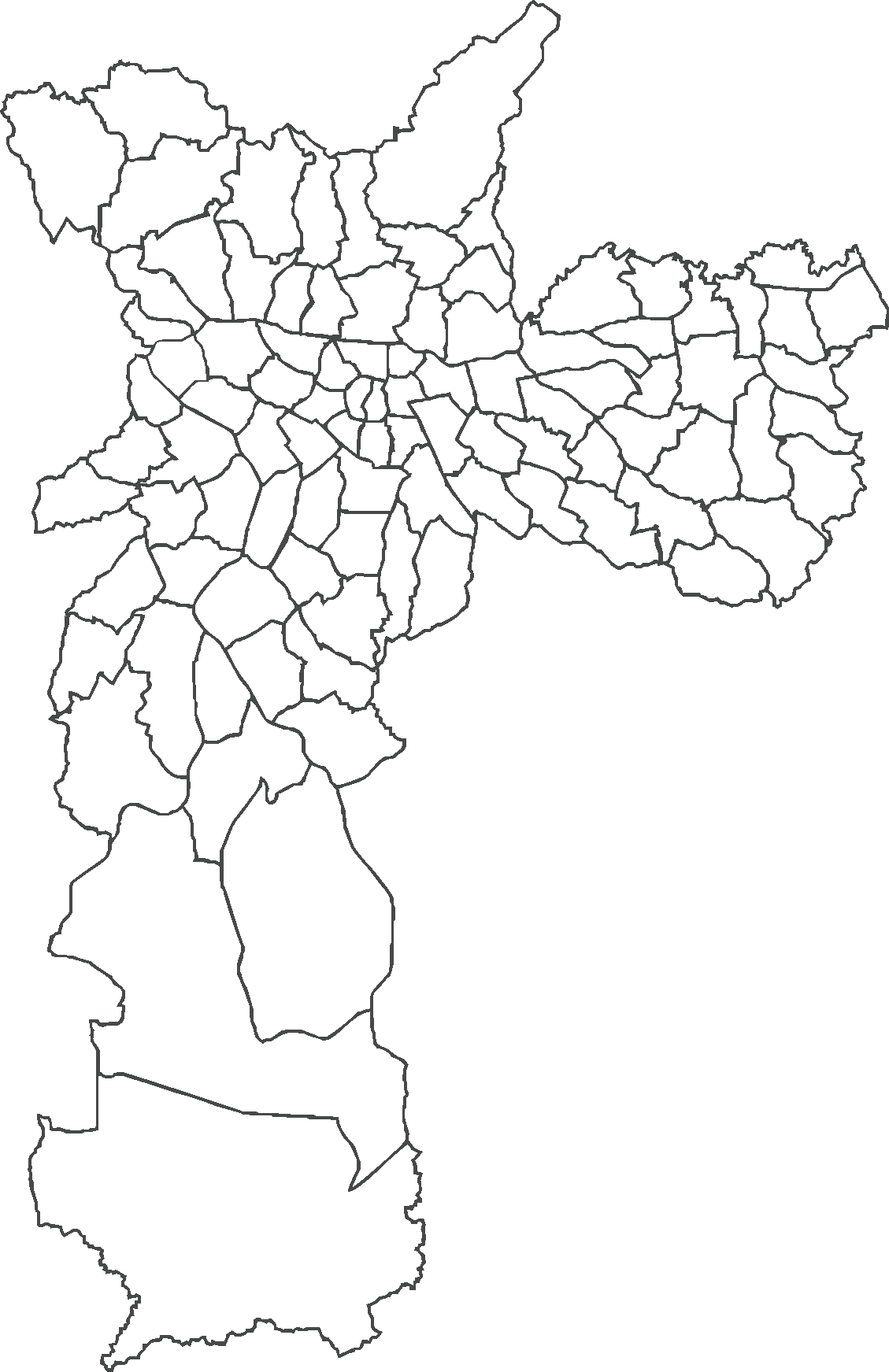
Districts of the city of São Paulo

== Neighborhoods ==
Some districts are further divided into bairros, which are the equivalent of neighborhoods or boroughs in English.

== Geographic areas ==
The city of São Paulo recognizes ten geographical areas used to reference locations in the city. These zones were established by dividing the city radially from the center and each is represented by a different color that is used on city buses and street signs. The only criterion used for this division is geographic boundaries (roads, rivers, etc.), having no relation whatsoever to the administrative divisions. Some districts can be partly in one geographic area, and partly in another.

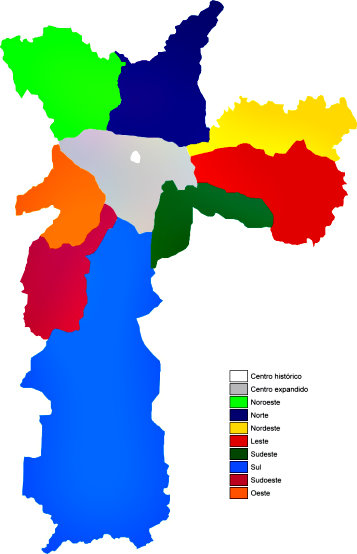
Legend Historical center Expanded center Northwest North East Northeast Southeast South Southwest West
