= List of fatal dog attacks in Brazil =

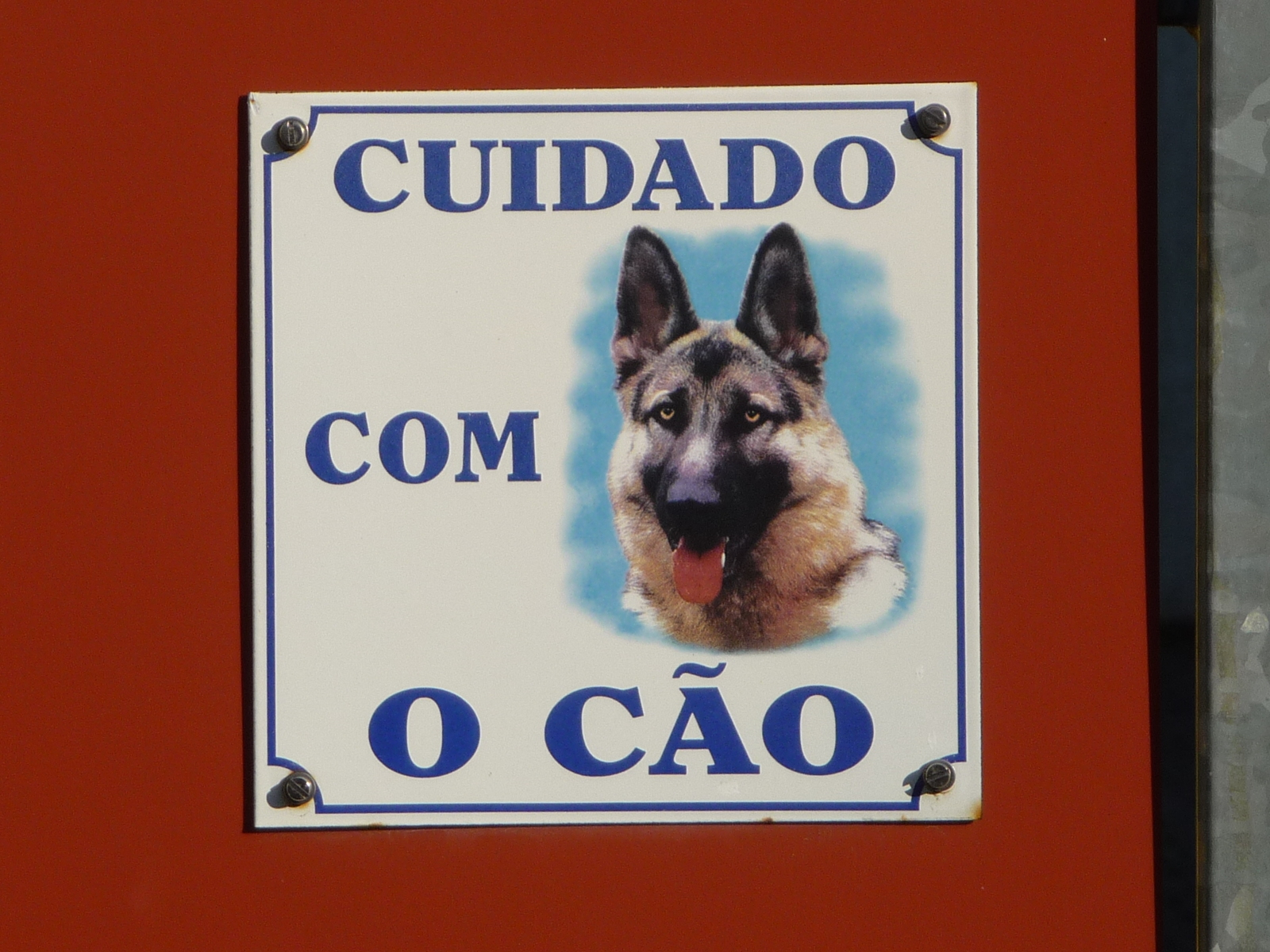
Warning sign in Portuguese: "Beware of the dog"

This is a list of human deaths caused by dogs, which have been documented through news media, reports, cause-of-death statistics, scientific papers, or other sources. The attribution of the dog type or breed is assigned by the sources. For additional information on causes of death and studies related to fatalities resulting from dog bites or attacks, see Fatal dog attacks.

Brazil is moving closer to the goal of eliminating deaths due to dog-mediated rabies. Since 1983 the incidence of dog-borne rabies has decreased by almost 98% with only six reported cases in 2021. Between 2010 and 2021, 39 cases of human rabies transmitted by various species were recorded. The last reported fatality due to dog transmitted rabies happened in 2010 in Ceará.

In 2023, the number of fatalities due to dog attacks increased significantly. São Paulo recorded the highest number of cases in the country, with 19 deaths, representing a 137.5% increase compared to the previous year. Rio Grande do Sul saw 7 deaths, reflecting a 40% increase, while Goiás experienced a 200% increase.

In April 2024, in response to a series of severe and fatal dog attacks, Member of Parliament Julio Cesar Ribeiro introduced an amendment to the penal code aimed at regulating such incidents. The proposed amendment suggests that walking certain dogs in public spaces without a muzzle should be deemed a criminal offense, carrying a potential prison sentence ranging from 15 days to 6 months. Ribeiro emphasized that these measures are not intended to penalize the dogs themselves but rather to hold owners accountable for failing to take necessary precautions to ensure community safety. Concerned about the increase in dog attacks and deaths Member of Parliament Mário Heringer pushes for a change in the law for some time. His drafted legislation (PL 7316) requires owners of specific dogs to possess a certificate of ownership for their animals. Furthermore, the draft proposes mandates for the containment of dogs within private properties through the use of appropriate gates and fences, aiming to prevent their presence on public roads. Criminal liability in the event of attacks is also addressed in the proposed legislation.

== Summary counts of fatalities by year ==
Official deaths per year from the Mortality Information System (SIM) of the Ministry of Health (Brazil):

1996. 6
1997. 1*
1998. 5
1999. 8
2000. 5
2001. 11
2002. 11
2003. 13
2004. 17
2005. 16
2006. 19
2007. 25
2008. 25
2009. 19
2010. 16
2011. 16
2012. 27
2013. 22
2014. 33
2015. 22
2016. 19
2017. 24
2018. 19
2019. 30
2020. 32
2021. 33
2022. 40
2023. 51
2024. 38*
2025. N/A

*according to this list.

== Fatalities in 2026 ==
Date	Victim	Age	Sex	Dog type (Number)	Circumstances
August 5, 2026	Édson Dutra da Trindade	82	M	Pit bull	Minas Gerais, Rio Novo, Zona da Mata mineira — His neighbor's dog invaded the victim's backyard and attacked him. The man died one day after the attack at the Emergency Hospital (Hospital de Pronto-Socorro - HPS) of Juiz de Fora.
August 1, 2026	Rosa Maria Ajala da Silva	66	F	Pit bull	Rio Grande do Sul, Arroio do Sal — She was feeding her nephew's dog and was attacked and killed.
July 31, 2026	Undisclosed	N/A	F	Undisclosed (3)	Paraná, Londrina — A disoriented woman entered a property early in the morning and was attacked and killed by the company's dogs. She was found by employees.
July 6, 2026	Valéria Pereira	59	F	Pit bull (2)	Goiás, Caldas Novas — She was bitten several times by escaped dogs and died after she developed complications from her injuries.
April 14, 2026	Undisclosed	69	M	Undisclosed	São Paulo, Piracicaba, São Pedro — The man was found dead in his backyard where he kept 3 dogs.
April 13, 2026	Maria José Mariano	49	F	Pit bull	Maranhão, Bacabal, Cordeiro — She was bathing her adult dog and was fatally attacked by it. Her husband was also attacked when he came home. The police had to kill the dog to help the man. The dog had exhibited aggressive behavior in the past.
March 7, 2026	Francisco Paulo da Silva	62	M	Pit bull	Rio Grande do Norte, Extremoz — The man worked in the backyard of a house when the property owner's dog attacked him. He died at the scene. The dog owners were accused of delaying to call for help. The dog was seized and placed with a dog trainer who reported unusual attack behavior that lasted for over 90 minutes.
February 23, 2026; February 24 †	Marlene Ferreira Leite	69	F	Pit bull (2)	São Paulo, São José dos Campos — The woman was walking a little public path and was attacked by loose dogs for about 20 minutes, according to witnesses. She lost 2 arms and 1 leg. She was eventually rescued by first responders of the fire department and was airlifted to the Municipal Hospital of Vila Industrial. She died in the hospital the next day.
February 1, 2026	Analu Souza Paixão	1	F	Pit bull	Bahia, Jaguaripe, Cruzeiro — Witnesses saw the attack happen on a playground of a pizzeria. While the girl played, a dog from the establishment broke loose and attacked her. The victim was referred to the Hospital Regional de Santo Antônio de Jesus (HRSAJ) but died.
February 1, 2026	Undisclosed	<1	M	Pit bull	São Paulo, Socorro — The 11-month-old baby was seen on CCTV being dragged by the stepfather's dog. He did not survive and his mother and stepfather are investigated for murder.
January 25, 2026	Undisclosed	80	F	Pit bull	Ceará, Fortaleza, Vila Velha neighborhood — The woman was attacked by the dog inside her home. She died at the scene.

== Fatalities in 2025 ==
Date	Victim	Age	Sex	Dog type (Number)	Circumstances
December 12, 2025, December 13 †	Undisclosed	72	F	Pit bull (3)	São Paulo, Ibúna, Paiol Pequeno — The woman was on her way to church when she was attacked and seriously injured. She died in hospital the next day.
December 3, 2025	Júlio César de Souza Oliveira	39	M	Pit bull and mixed breed (10)	São Paulo, São José dos Campos — The man had an argument with the dog owner. He was attacked by her dogs and died at the scene.
November 25, 2025	Guilherme Lopes dos Santos	30	M	Pit bull (2)	São Paulo, Cidade Líder — The man was attacked by two dogs and died shortly after at the hospital. The police shot one dog.
November 23, 2025	Juliana de Oliveira	25	F	Pit bull	São Paulo, Campinas, Vila Industrial — The woman was attacked in her backyard. A neighbor unsuccessfully tried to stop the dog with an iron bar.
November 12, 2025	Igor Pereira da Silva	4 or 5	M	Pit bull	Rio de Janeiro, Irajá — The boy was attacked at his grandmother's house by his aunt's boyfriend's 7-month-old dog named Enrico. He died 5 minutes after he arrived at Francisco da Silva Telles Municipal Hospital.
October 20, 2025, November 28 †	Lia Hollywood (Souza Ferraz)	66	F	Pit bull	Rio de Janeiro, São Pedro da Aldeia — She was attacked by the family dog and suffered severe injuries to her whole body, including open fractures. She was transferred to the Roberto Chabo Hospital where one arm had to be amputated.
October 14, 2025, October 16†	José Henrique Monteiro	<1	M	Pit bull	Rio de Janeiro, Campos — The 10-month-old baby was attacked and died 2 days later in Ferreira Machado hospital. His 2-year-old brother and his nanny were also injured by the dog.
October 5, 2025	Undisclosed	57	M	Rottweiler (3)	
September 13, 2025	Paulo Roberto de Carvalho	63	M	Pit bull (2)	Rio de Janeiro, Saracuruna, Duque de Caxias, Baixada Fluminense — He was on his was to work when he was attacked. The dogs escaped their owner when he opened the gate to his property. The victim was taken to the Estadual Adão Pereira Nunes hospital but died due to his severe injuries to his arms and face.
September 9, 2025	Vizinhos de Maria Natália Curado Fleury	75	F	Pit bull	Goiás, Annapolis — She was attacked by her grandson's dog. First responders had difficulties rescuing her, due to the dog.
September 8, 2025	Undisclosed	1	M	Pit bull	São Paulo, Itanhaém — The family dog lived with the family for 7 years and was described as non-aggressive. The dog attacked the baby while it was sleeping.
September 6, 2025	Américo Sampaio de Souza	63	M	Pit bull (4)	Minas do Leão — The man was attacked while delivering to an elderly customer and died after being in a coma for 5 days.
August 21, 2025	Hisako Nakashima	89	F	Undisclosed	Paraná, Maringá, Jardim Liberdade — The woman with advanced Alzheimer's disease was outside her home in a wheelchair when the family dog injured her arm. She died at the hospital.
August 21, 2025	Samuel dos Santos	45	M	Pit bull	São Paulo, Iperó — The victim suffered severe injuries to his legs and died at the George Oetterer's ER.
July 21, 2025	Undisclosed	2	F	Pit bull	São Paulo, Hortolândia — The dog attacked the girl and did not let go of her. Bystanders were unable to help her. The police shot the dog 3 times.
July 2, 2025	Enzo Gabriel Silva Custódio	4	M	Pit bull	Goiás, Itumbiara — The victim and his young siblings were home alone when the dog attacked and killed him.
May 27, 2025	Undisclosed	<1		Pit bull	Goiás, Goiânia, Jardim América — The 10-month-old child was in her mother's arms when the grandparents' dog attacked.
May 26, 2025	Aldemir Gomes	50	M	Pit bull	São Paulo, Campinas, Vila Industrial — The dog owner was attacked by his dog and died shortly after being rescued. The dog was shot by police.
April 27, 2025	Geny José Nunes Lopes	66	F	Pit bull	São Paulo, Votorantim — She was attacked inside her house and neighbors called the police when they saw her injured near her house's wall. The police had to put the dog down to get to the victim. She was rescued, but succumbed to her injuries.
April 20, 2025	Sônia Maria Benício da Costa	75	F	Pit bull	Rio de Janeiro, Barra Mansa — The victim entered her sister's house and was attacked by the dog. She died at the scene.
April 14, 2025	Lucas Levi dos Santos	<1	M	Pit bull	Pernambuco, São Lourenço da Mata — The pitbull, who was in the house's backyard, invaded the house and attacked the victim. He died at the scene.
April 13, 2025	Stefane Xavier da Silva	31	F	Pit bull	Goiás, Cidade Ocidental — The dog bit the victim on the neck, who suffered severe blood loss. When a rescue team arrived at the scene, she was already dead. Neighbors killed the dog.
March 30, 2025	Isamara Eleoterio Balbino	40	F	Pit bull	Minas Gerais, Três Corações — The woman was on the street, near the gate of the house where the dog lived, when the dog attacked her. Neighbors had to intervene to stop the attack. The Fire Brigade was taking her to the hospital when she suffered a cardiopulmonary arrest and was revived, but did not resist and later died.
March 18, 2025	Undisclosed		M	Rottweiler (2)	São Paulo, Piracicaba — The man tried to break into a house and was attacked and killed by 2 dogs.
March 14, 2025	Hieda Pariz Hildebrand	<1	F	Mixed breed	São Paulo, Leme — The baby was in a carriage when the dog, who was tied to a chain, got close to the carriage and attacked her, biting her on the head.
March 12, 2025, March 16 †	Guilherme Gabriel Couta da Silva	12	M	Rottweiler (2)	Minas Gerais, Itabira — The boy was attacked by two escaped dogs while walking down a street.
March 3, 2025*	Aline Poppe	49	F	Pit bull	Rio de Janeiro, Irajá — She was attacked by her nephew's dog. Her neighbors rescued her, but she died later. *date of the news report
February 22, 2025	Célia Faria	71	F	Pit bull	Rio de Janeiro, Niterói — The woman was in her backyard when the dog, who belonged to a neighbor, escaped its house and attacked her.
January 24, 2025	Sérgio Renato Freitas	62	M	Pit bull	Pará, Belém — The man's wife found him dead in their house, with his body pierced and torn apart. He was alone with the dog in the house.
January 15, 2025	Ravi Lucas Nascimento de Melo	4	M	Pit bull (1) Mixed breed (1)	Rio Grande do Norte, Touros — The dogs belonged to the boy's grandmother, who went to the neighbour to get some medicine. While she was away, the dogs, who were loose in the yard, got inside the house and attacked the boy. He suffered a deep lacerating injury, which involved part of his skull and exposed his brain mass, as well as his neck.

== Fatalities in 2024 ==
Date	Victim	Age	Sex	Dog type (Number)	Circumstances
December 23, 2024	Undisclosed		M	Pit bull	Espírito Santo, Nova Venécia — A man tried to escape from angry people he was allegedly trying to steal from. He jumped over a wall into an adjacent yard and was attacked by the dog living there. He managed to jump back over the wall but died on the site as a result of his injuries.
December 23, 2024 † December 19, 2024	Juarez Quadros Ribeiro	62	M	Pit bull (3)	Paraná, Wenceslau Braz — The dogs, who belonged to his daughter, attacked him inside their house. Police had to shoot and kill all three to be able to rescue the man. He had both of his forearms amputated due to the severity of his injuries. He died in the hospital.
December 1, 2024	Roberta Vicentini Franco	54	F	Pit bull	São Paulo, Ribeirão Preto — She was attacked inside a plot of land, where the dog was tied up with a large rope which was attached to the railing of an abandoned house.
November 16, 2024 November 18, 2024 †	José Olegário dos Santos Souza	75	M	Pit bull (1) Dogo Argentino (1)	Rio Grande do Sul, Uruguaiana — José was mowing the lawn when the neighbor's dogs escaped and attacked him. He was taken to a hospital, where he died two days later.
November 14, 2024	Nilton Nivaldo De Souza	37	M	Pit bull	São Paulo, Ribeirão Pires — De Souza was doing renovations for the dog's owner when the dog broke through a metal door and attacked and killed the man.
November 12, 2024	Undisclosed	4	M	Pit bull	Rio de Janeiro, Irajá — The victim was with his mother at the house of a friend, when he was attacked by a dog, which belonged to the son-in-law of the owner of the house.
November 1, 2024	Wander Lucio de Moura	54	M	Pit bull	Minas Gerais, Congonhas — The dog broke free from its chain and attacked the man, who was at the house as a guest for a party. He was bitten on the neck and face.
October 12, 2024	Heitor Livramento Cardoso	4	M	Pit bull	Espírito Santo, Nova Venécia — He was playing on his house's backyard when the family dog attacked him, biting him on the neck and head. He was taken to a hospital, but succumbed to his injuries. The dog was shot dead by a neighbor.
October 1, 2024	Inez Francisca da Silva	80	F	Pit bull	São Paulo, São Paulo, Grajaú — The dog was chained up and, somehow, broke free and attacked the woman, biting her on the neck.
September 30, 2024	Kael	1	M	Pit bull	Rondônia, Presidente Médici — The boy was playing in the backyard of his house when he was attacked by the family dog.
September 29, 2024	Undisclosed	25	M	Rottweiler (2+)	Santa Catarina, Criciúma — The man jumped over a property's wall in order to rob the place, but was attacked and killed by the property's guard dogs. His corpse was found hours later by the building's owner.
September 20, 2024	Valdivino Custódio Pereira	66	M	Pit bull (2)	Minas Gerais, Patos de Minas — When the man entered his sister's house, the dogs, who belonged to her, attacked him, biting him on the neck. He died at the scene. Police had to shoot the dogs to retrieve his corpse and rescue two other people that were also injured.
September 16, 2024 September 17, 2024 †	Leonardo Lustosa da Silveira Castro	68	M	Pit bull	Pernambuco, Olinda — The man was talking to a neighbor, who was walking his dog. At one point, the man got closer and tried to pet the dog, who then lunged and bit him on the neck. He was rescued by relatives and taken to a hospital, where he succumbed to his injuries. Doctors noted that the bite had severed his jugular vein.
August 31, 2024 September 7, 2024 †	Dulcelina Firmino de Oliveira	60	F	Pit bull	Espírito Santo, Serra — She was walking her dogs when the pit bull, which was loose on the street, lunged at them. She then tried to lift her dogs, but the leash got tangled on her leg, causing her to fall on her back. She went to a hospital, did an X-ray, was treated for a coccyx dislocation and was discharged. On September 4, she went to the hospital again due to urinating blood and was hospitalized after a kidney injury was found, caused by the fall. She died at the hospital.
August 31, 2024	Enilton Fernandes Ribeiro	73	M	Pit bull mix	Rio Grande do Sul, Bagé — The dog belonged to the man's son. It bit the man on the thorax, inflicting several injuries.
August 18, 2024	Anderson Alves Fernandes	42	M	Rottweiler	Goiás, Anápolis — The man was caught naked sexually abusing a mutt on the street. After that, he opened the gate of the house where the other dog was. The dog then attacked him, biting him on the legs and tearing off a piece of his buttocks. The dog's owner tried to get it off him, but he was already dead.
August 15, 2024	Luiza Pereira dos Santos	57	F	Undisclosed (4)	São Paulo, Penápolis — The neighbor's four dogs invaded her property and attacked her. Her son found her unconscious with her chest covered in blood. She was taken to the city's emergency room, where she succumbed to her injuries.
August 12, 2024	Claudio Gomes de Lima	56	M	Pit bull	Paraná, Matinhos — The dog escaped from its property, attacked a nearby woman and then attacked the man when he tried to help her. He was bitten on the neck and head.
July 2024 August 2024 †	Veraci de Paula	87	F	Pit bull	São Paulo, — The 87-year-old was attacked by loose dogs while looking after her plants. She was hospitalized and died a month after the attack.
July 15, 2024	Eleandro Dimas Malone Neto	2	M	Rottweiler	São Paulo, Tanabi — The boy was bitten on the neck by the family dog. He was taken to the emergency room, but did not survive.
June 17, 2024	Benedita Francisca da Fonseca	83	F	Pit bull	São Paulo, Icém — She fell and was bitten on the neck by her son's dog. She died at the hospital. The son had the dog for 7 years. A neighbor who tried to help was also bitten.
June 4, 2024	Isis da Silva Sobrinho	<1	F	Undisclosed	Goiás, Cidade Oeste — The 5-month-old girl was left home alone and was attacked by her grandparents' dog. They had the dog for 5 years. Her uncle tried to save the girl, but she died in the hospital.
June 3, 2024	Juliano Barcelos da Rosa	39	M	Pit bull (2)	Santa Catarina, Criciúma — The man was tasked with doing work on the property. He was attacked when he entered the area where the dogs were confined. Due to the presence of the dogs, first responders were unable to help the victim. The police shot the dogs, but he had already died at the scene.
May 17, 2024	Elza Maria de Souza	85	F	Undisclosed	São Paulo, Itaberá — She was attacked in her yard by one of her neighbor's three dogs.
May 11, 2024	Jamiro Coelho Ferreira	77	M	Pit bull	São Paulo, Cruzeiro, Natividae — He was attacked by a dog he was tasked with feeding in the past. The dog was with the owners since he was a puppy. He died at the hospital.
April 27, 2024	Undisclosed	38	M	Pit bull (4)	Santa Catarina, Florianópolis, Ingleses — The man wanted to do some repair work on the property and was attacked by the dogs he knew. 3 dogs were fatally shot and one was brought to the veterinarian for treatment.
April 20, 2024	Undisclosed		F	Pit bull	Rio de Janeiro, Campo Grande — A woman died in the hospital after she was attacked by a dog.
April 16, 2024	Undisclosed	57	M	Rottweiler	Minas Gerais, Montes Claros, Roxo Verde — The man was attacked by his dog and died from his injuries.
April 14, 2024	Hugo Otávio Tobias	30	M	Pit bull	São Paulo, Mogi Mirim, Vila Dias — A young man was killed by his dog. He was having an epileptic seizure at the time of the attack. The family was not able to stop the dog from attacking, so a neighbor had to shoot the dog.
March 20, 2024	Franciele Vitória Soares dos Santos	9	F	Pit bull	Piauií, Santa Bárbara, Teresina — The child was attacked by the dog while she was sleeping. She was taken to the hospital but did not survive. The family dog had been in the family home for seven years.
March 17, 2024	Jeferson Gomes dos Santos	24	M	Pit bull	Espírito Santo, Linhares, Aviso — The owner was attacked by his dog and died at the scene. He had injuries to his neck and face.
March 15, 2024	Antony Ricardo Oliveira da Silva	6	M	Rottweiler	Acre, Rio Branco, Segundo — According to police, the child was used to feeding and playing with the family dog. Family members found him bleeding in the yard and transported him to the hospital. He did not survive his injuries.
February 25, 2024	Undisclosed	49	M	Pit bull	São Paulo, Ponte Rasa — The man tried to save his dog from an attacking loose dog and died in hospital. His dog was able to escape and survived.
February 24, 2024	Undisclosed	<1	F	Pit bull	São Paulo, Bebedouro, Jardim Marajá — An 11-month-old baby was attacked in her sleep by a dog at her aunt and uncle's house. She was taken to hospital, where she succumbed to her injuries.
February 17, 2024	Sidney Aparecido Anastácio	62	M	Fila Brasileiro (1–5)	Rondônia, Presidente Médici — The pair was attacked while trying to remove porcupine quills that were on the snout of one of the dogs. A family member found the pair and alerted police. 4 of the dogs were shot, 1 fled into the nearby forest.
February 17, 2024	Valdelice de Oliveira Anastácio	55	F	Fila Brasileiro (1–5)	Rondônia, Presidente Médici — The pair was attacked while trying to remove porcupine quills that were on the snout of one of the dogs. A family member found the pair and alerted police. 4 of the dogs were shot, 1 fled into the nearby forest.
February 12, 2024	Arthur Felipe Oliveira	3	M	Rottweiler	Bahia, Teofilândia — The boy followed his mother into the yard and was attacked by the family dog.
January 17, 2024	Maria Gomes Ferreira	78	F	Pit bull (5)	Roraima, São João da Baliza — The woman went to visit her son and was attacked by his dogs. Her daughter was also attacked and injured.
January 14, 2024 January 18, 2024 †	Dirceu de Carvalho	60	M	Pit bull	Mato Grosso do Sul, Campo Grande, Los Angeles — The man was bit in the hand and died four days later.
January 8, 2024	Henrique Borba	70	M	Rottweiler	Pará, Juruti — The owner was attacked and killed while feeding the dog.

== Fatalities in 2023 ==
Date	Victim	Age	Sex	Dog type (Number)	Circumstances
December 7, 2023	Undisclosed	1	M	Pit bull	São Paulo, Caraguatatuba — The child was attacked by the family dog and died at the hospital.
November 25, 2023	Undisclosed	2	F	Pit bull	Bahia, Lençóis, Paulista — The girl was attacked in the living room by the family dog. A 12-year-old teenager was also bitten.
October 13, 2023	Maria Bárbara Conceição de Jesus	42	F	Rottweiler (3)	Bahia, Camamu — She was fishing on Ilha Grande when the dogs attacked her and bit her in the head. She died before she arrived at the hospital.
October 11, 2023	Undisclosed	33	M	Pit bull	São Paulo, Itapetininga — He tried to help a family member that was attacked by his dog and the dog turned on him.
October 4, 2023	Luísa Vitória Vieira Soares	1	F	Pit bull of the type American Bully (1–2)	Minas Gerais, Betim, Belo Horizonte, Parque do Cedro — The dog owner and aunt was watching the baby for the parents. She was also injured by one of her two dogs.
September 27, 2023	Pyettro Alves da Silva	2	M	Pit bull	Bahia, Teixeira de Freitas — The boy went into the garden to get a ball. The family's dog attacked him. The 7-month-old dog was bought just two days before the attack.
September 18, 2023	Antônio Bibiano de Brito	75	M	Pit bull (3)	São Paulo, Ribeirão Preto, Jardim Salgado Filho —The couple was attacked in their home by their nephew's dogs. The nephew lived on their property and was not at home at the time of the incident. 4 dogs were picked up by an NGO and placed in a shelter-like facility.
September 18, 2023	Maria das Dores de Jesus Pereira de Brito	79	F	Pit bull (3)	São Paulo, Ribeirão Preto, Jardim Salgado Filho —The couple was attacked in their home by their nephew's dogs. The nephew lived on their property and was not at home at the time of the incident. 4 dogs were picked up by an NGO and placed in a shelter-like facility.
July 11, 2023	Iranilda Alves Rocha	58	F	Pit bull	Goiás, Jaupaci — Fatally killed while trying to break up a fight between her two dogs when the pit bull turned on her.
July 2, 2023	Helenita Lopes Machado	61	F	Pit bull	Minas Gerais, Paraguaçu — A woman and her husband were at their flat, in a condominium, when they were attacked by their neighbours escaped pit bull, they were both taken to the hospital where Helenita died from her injuries.
July 1, 2023	Ruan Miguel	<1	M	Pit bull	Maranhão, São Luís, Codó — The 10-month-old child was visiting his grandmother, who raised the dog since it was a puppy. The dog attacked when the mother bathed her son on the terrace of the house, where the dog was running around freely.
June 7, 2023	Undisclosed	<1		Pit bull	São Paulo, Guaianases — A 3-month-old baby was killed by the family dog.
May 23, 2023	João Ferreira dos Santos	71	M	Pit bull	Rio de Janeiro, Quintino — The victim was found lifeless in the yard of his house. First responders had to shoot the dog. The dog belonged to his son.
April 11, 2023	Undisclosed		M	Pit bull	São Paulo, Jundiaí — Two dogs were kept separately on the property. One of the dogs escaped into the yard and was attacked by the other dog. While trying to stop the fight, one of the owners was bitten. His brother tried to help but was also attacked.
April 6, 2023	Undisclosed	67	M	Pit bull (3)	São Paulo, Vale do Ribeira, Registro — The dogs escaped from a house and attacked the victim, who was sitting and resting on the sidewalk. The man suffered severe injuries to his stomach, arms and legs. Neighbors drove away the dogs and provided first aid to the man. He was taken to the emergency room but succumbed to his injuries.
March 14, 2023	Vilma Girotto Carbonera	78	F	Pit bull	Rio Grande do Sul, Veranópolis — She was attacked on the neck by the family dog in the house where she lived in the Renovação neighborhood. The 2-year-old dog was adopted a year prior by the victim's son, who also lived in the apartment.
February 27, 2023	Ivete Machado Luiz	69	F	Pit bull (1–8)	São Paulo, Mogi das Cruzes, Botujuru — The victim was killed by the dogs of her son.
February 15, 2023	Undisclosed	70	F	Pit bull (3)	São Paulo, Mairiporã — A woman died after being attacked by three dogs. According to local residents, the owner had a habit of leaving the dogs unattended. Neighbors rescued the victim and the dogs were confiscated.

== Fatalities in 2022 ==
Date	Victim	Age	Sex	Dog type (Number)	Circumstances
December 30, 2022	Undisclosed	70	F	Undisclosed	Goias — The woman was attacked while she was tending to the plants in the garden. Her grandson tried to scare away the neighbor's dog with a machete, but the dog wouldn't let go of the woman.
October 9, 2022	Undisclosed	54	F	Rottweiler (2)	Minas Gerais, Belo Horizonte, Jardim Vitória — The dogs entered the woman's room and attacked her. She was bedridden and recovering from a stroke.
September 16, 2022	Guilherme Santos Sena	3	M	Pit bull	Bahia, Jequié, Mandacaru— The child opened the door to the yard and was attacked by the dog.
August 15, 2022	Undisclosed	69	M	Mix of medium size	Minas Gerais, Belo Horizonte, Confis — The man was attacked by his own dog and died from blood loss. According to his wife, the dog was acting strange days before the attack.
July 15, 2022	Joselina Cerqueira	81	F	Pit bull	Rio de Janeiro, Nilópolis — The dog belonged to one of the victim's neighbors. The man allegedly left the gate open. The dog attacked the woman who was passing by the property.
April 6, 2022	Miguel	1	M	Pit bull	São Paulo, Botucatu, Jardim do Bosque — The child was attacked by the 4-year-old family dog in his parents' yard.
March 11, 2022	Márcio André	49	M	Pit bull of the variety Pit Monster	Macapá, Goiabal — The man was responsible for feeding the male dog and was attacked by it. Nearby workers heard the screams and saw the attack, they described it as everlasting. He was severely injured and died on his way to hospital. According to reports, his own female dog of the same breed did not attack him.
February 17, 2022	Sidirley do Rosário Cravo	40	M	Pit bull (1+)	Espírito Santo, Vitória, Cariacica, Maracanã — The dog owner found the man in the morning. Neighbors said they heard loud barking around 2 a.m. and suspect the man entered the property at that time and was attacked by the dogs.
January 17, 2022	Undisclosed	<1	M	Pit bull	São Paulo, Limeira, Águas da Serra — The family dog entered the room where the 21-day-old baby was sleeping and attacked the child. The grandfather stabbed the dog in an effort to free the baby from the dog's mouth.

== Fatalities in 2021 ==
Date	Victim	Age	Sex	Dog type (Number)	Circumstances
November 12, 2021; November 16 †	Juliana da Silva Rosa	31	F	Pit bull (3)	São Paulo, Ourinhos — The victim was attacked in the early morning hours while walking home. The dogs escaped the owner while he opened his gate. She died days later in Marilia (SP).
November 15, 2021	Fábio	11	M	German Shepherd	Minas Gerais, São Joaquim de Bicas, Boa Esperança — The neighbor's dog was loose on the street and attacked the boy. His father found him dead in front of the neighbor's house.
August 14, 2021	Undisclosed	<1 (26 days)	F	Unknown	Santa Catarina, Biguaçu — A family pet bit a child in the head following a dog fight at home. Authorities later informed the public that it was not a Chow Chow as first reported. After the incident, some dog owners of this breed started to abandon their dogs. Due to this, the local environmental authority of Biguaçu felt it was necessary to publish a correction. They did not provide any information about the actual type of dog.
August 1, 2021	Esther Vianna da Silveira	4	F	Rottweiler	Rio de Janeiro — Girl was playing with the family dog in the garden when the attack occurred. Girl died from several injuries to the head.
July 21, 2021	Marli Donegá Tizura	53	F	Pit bull (6)	São Paulo, Birigui — The victim was returning to a country house, carrying pizza boxes, and was attacked by the 6 dogs. She had multiple fractures, scalped, and extensive other injuries. She was familiar with the dogs who had never acted aggressively. Dogs were well cared for and kept.
April 18, 2021	Undisclosed	2	M	Pit bull	Goiás, Luziânia — Family pet of several years, attacked the 2 brothers, one of 2yo and the other of 7yo. Police shot the animal on site. Younger boy died of severe injuries to neck and head.
February 2, 2021	Aglacir de Macedo Pereira	46	M	Pit bull (7)	Sergipe, Pinhão, Lageado Feio — The man was out for a walk as he often did when the dogs attacked him and severely injured his face. The dogs had run away from a farm.
February 15, 2021	Phelipe dos Santos Vieira	26	M	Pit bull (2)	Rio de Janeiro, Araruama — The victim was looking after dogs whose owners were out of the city. 2 other boys, ages 7 and 9 years old were attacked. Each dog received two shots as they weren't stopping attacking the victims.

== Fatalities from 2000 to 2020 ==
Date	Victim	Age	Sex	Dog type (Number)	Circumstances
June 23, 2020	Analû Novais	<1	F	Undisclosed	Bahia, Piripá — The family dog attacked the 26-days-old twins. One was dead on arrival and one died at the hospital.
June 23, 2020	Anne Novais	<1	F	Undisclosed	Bahia, Piripá — The family dog attacked the 26-days-old twins. One was dead on arrival and one died at the hospital.
December 25, 2019	Luiz Fernando Teixeira de Santana	10	M	Pit bull (6)	São Paulo — The boy was playing in a park when his kite fell onto the property next door. The boy jumped over the wall and was attacked by the dogs. A helicopter was called to the rescue, but the victim did not survive. Three dogs were killed in an effort to save the child.
November 18, 2019	Vitória Ribeiro dos Santos	1	F	Rottweiler	Mato Grosso do Sul, Cláudia — She was sleeping when she was attacked by the dog at her mother's workplace. She died on her way to hospital.
October 22, 2019	Undisclosed	78	M	Pit bull	São Paulo, Piracaia — The dog escaped its property and attacked an elderly man who was pulling weeds on a nearby property. A neighbor tried to help but was also attacked.
October 8, 2019	Otto Baum Nascimento	1	M	Rottweiler	Rio Grande do Sul, Sapiranga — His grandmother was feeding her dog in a kennel. The dog escaped and attacked him inside the house. He was taken to the Sapiranga Hospital in critical condition and died.
July 19, 2019	Laura Emanuelly de Freitas Silva	1	F	Pit bull	Bahia, Itapicuru — The child was alone in a bed in a room when she was bitten on the head by the family dog. She was taken to the local hospital but did not survive her injuries. The dog has known the child since birth.
March 11, 2019	Edmilson Alves de Oliveira	55	M	Pit bull (2)	Goiás, Goiânia — The victim was attacked by his dogs named Spike and Lessie. His wife was not able to get the dogs off him. His son-in-law heard the screams for help and also tried to get the dogs to let go of him. But they did not stop, even when hit with a heavy construction tool ("picolé de concreto"). According to the family, the family dogs were friendly until recently. A month before, they killed another dog that lived in the house.
January 15, 2019	Cristiane Galo	44	F	Pit bull	São Paulo, Ituverava — The dog owner had the dog for five years. She was home alone when neighbors heard her screams during the attack. She was rescued but did not survive.
September 13, 2017	Undisclosed	<1	F	Rottweiler	São Paulo, Mogi das Cruzes — The 27-day-old baby was attacked by the family dog and died.
July 23, 2017	Pietra	1	F	Pit bull	São Paulo — The 3-year-old family dog attacked the girl. She died at the hospital.
January 7, 2017	Ary de Oliveira Mendes	83	M	Pit bull (3)	Rio de Janeiro, São Gonçalo — The man saved a child from the dogs and was subsequently attacked and killed.
August 24, 2016	Undisclosed	88	F	Pit bull	Minas Gerais, Belo Horizonte — She was killed by the family dog.
November 5, 2013	Manoel Pereira do Nascimento	52	M	Pit bull	São Paulo — The dog killed its owner and attacked the victim's wife later. The family had the dog for 8 years. The dog had already injured a child in the past.
April 2013	Rosa Ubeda Alves	75	F	Rottweiler	São Paulo, Guararapes — She put the 10-year-old family dog into a kennel and was attacked and killed. They had the dog since it was a puppy. Her daughter was also injured by the dog.
February 18, 2012	Heloísa Maria Campolina Mourão	70	F	Unknown (1+), Fila Brasileiro (1)	Minas Gerais, Pampulha — The woman was attacked by her dogs and died at the scene. One dog was described as a Fila.
June 18, 2010	Fernando Jorge Paes	44	M	Pit bull	Mato Grosso do Sul, Campo Grande — The owner was attacked by his dog. The dog was euthanized.
August 31, 2009	Undisclosed	16	F	Pit bull (4)	Pernambuco — She was attacked on a farm and died at the hospital.
August 31, 2007	Haroldo da Silva	76	M	Pit bull	São Paulo, Ipiranga —He was attacked by his male dog in his home. His daughter and neighbors tried to help but were not able to save him. He was already dead when first responders arrived.
January 7, 2006	Undisclosed	<1	F	Undisclosed	Paraná, Londrina — The 17-days-old baby died after it was attacked in her stroller by the unleashed family dog named Rambo.
October 14, 2003	Antônia Firmino	49	F	Pit bull	São Paulo, Campinas, Limeira — The neighbor's dogs invaded her property and attacked her so badly that she died. The dogs also killed a dog on her property.
November 2000	Helena Maria da Conceição	65	F	Fila Brasileiro	São Paulo, Cidade Ademar — She was attacked while feeding one of her 3 dogs of the same breed. Family members could not stop the dog.

== Fatalities before 2000 ==
Date	Victim	Age	Sex	Dog type (Number)	Circumstances
March 22, 1998	Joaquim Nascimento Costa	43	M	Neapolitan Mastiff (1+)	Paraná, Curitiba — The dog owner was attacked by at least one of his 8 dogs. Neighbors heard the calls for help and alerted police. Police had to shoot the dogs to get to the man.
November 13, 1997	Sonia Hosti	50	F	Rottweiler	São Paulo, Santa Isabel — She went into a kennel to feed a 5-year-old dog named Cone and was attacked.

== See also ==
- List of wolf attacks
- Dog bite
- Manchinha case
