= Itaquera =

Itaquera may refer to:

- Subprefecture of Itaquera, São Paulo
- Itaquera (district of São Paulo)
- Corinthians-Itaquera (São Paulo Metro)
- Arena Corinthians or Itaquerão, a sports stadium in São Paulo
