= Itaquera (district of São Paulo) =

District of São Paulo, Brazil

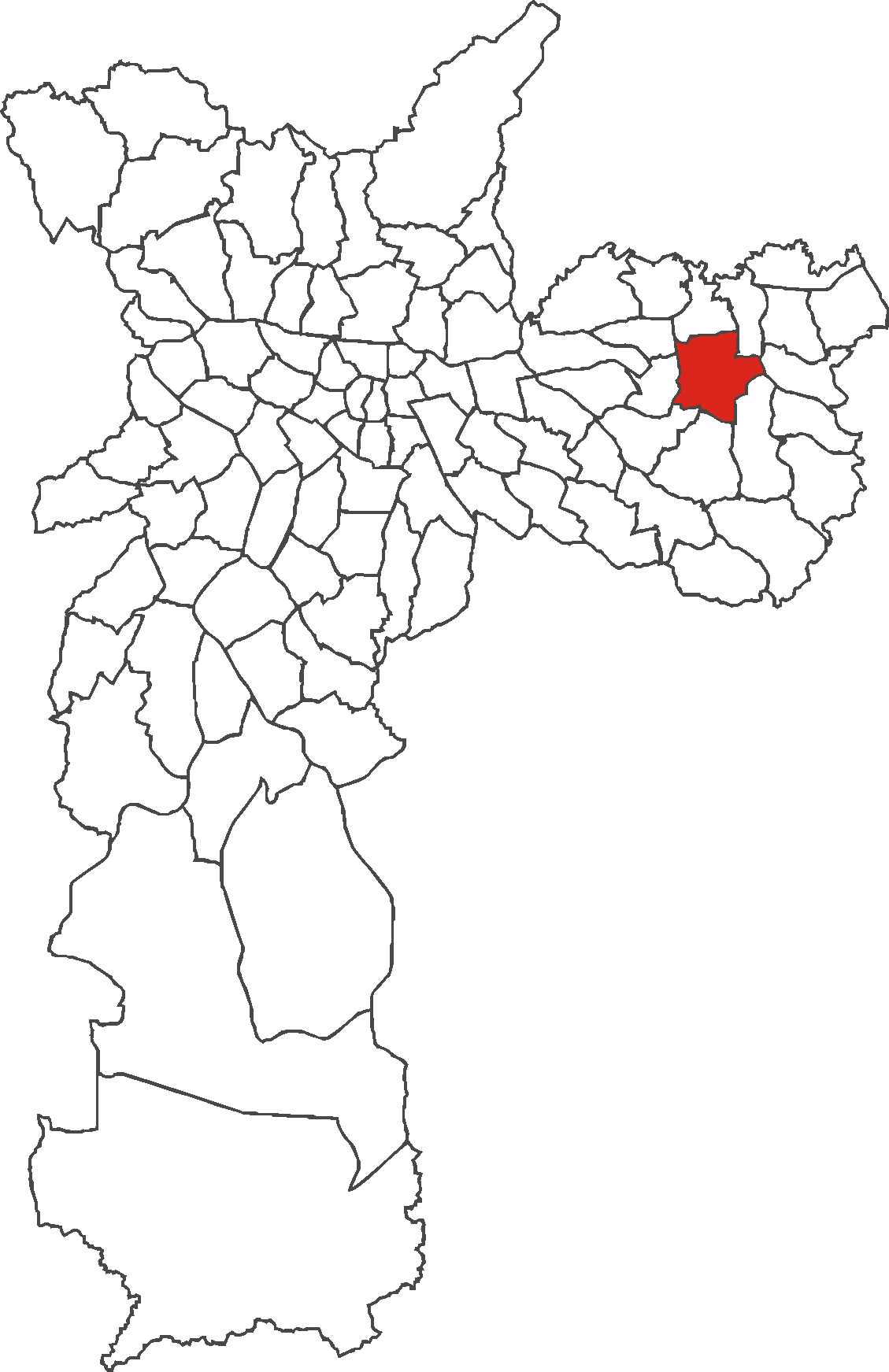
- Location in the city of São Paulo

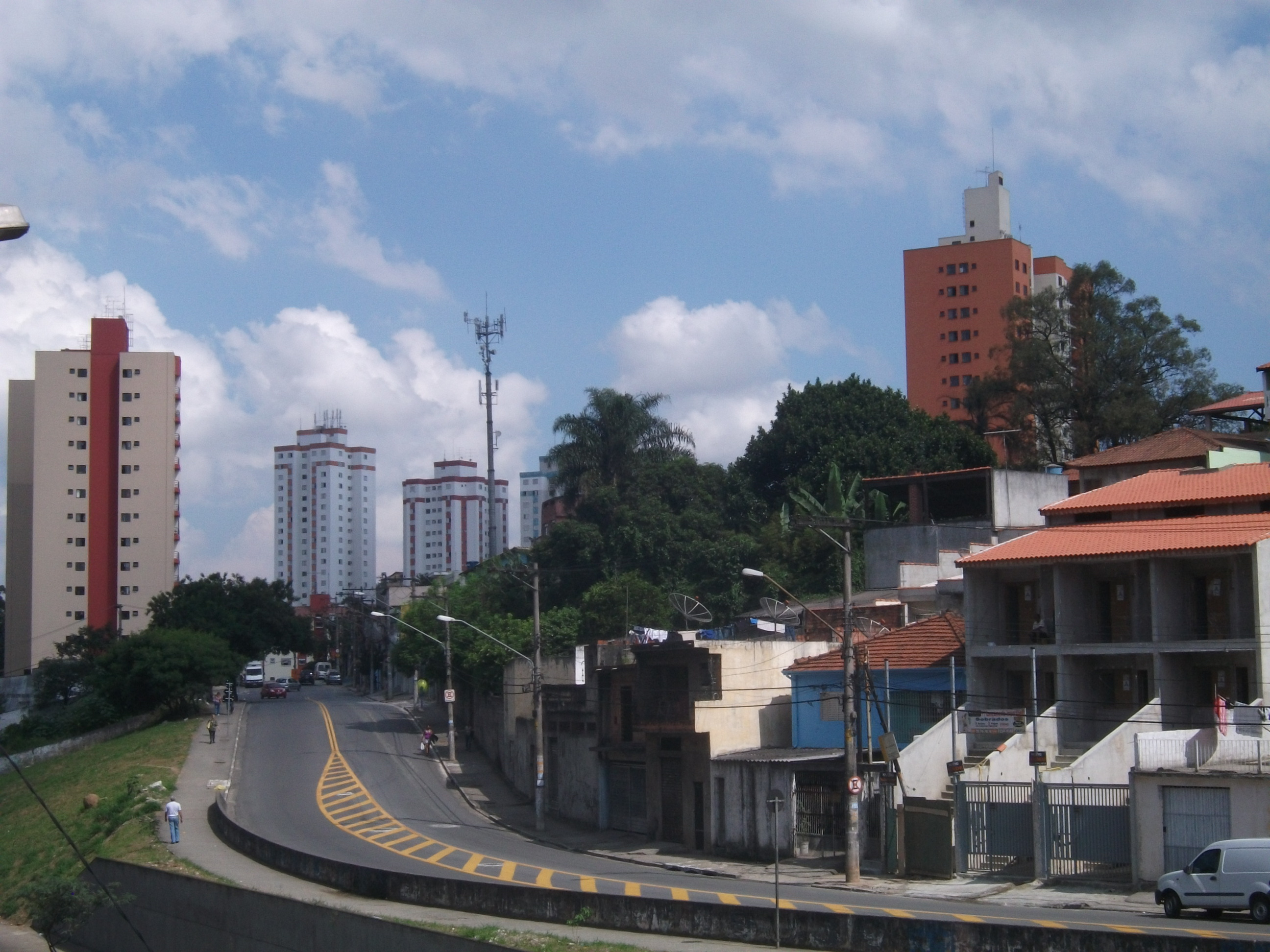
- Country: Brazil
- State: São Paulo
- City: São Paulo

Government

Area
  - Total: 14.60 km^{2} (5.64 sq mi)

Population (2007)
  - Total: 204,871
- HDI: 0.795

Itaquera is a district in the subprefecture of Itaquera of the city and prefecture of São Paulo in Brazil.

The population of the District in 2010 was 204,871.

The name in Tupi means "hard stone", "insensitive stone" or "rest stone".

== History ==
=== Settlement ===
The earliest references to the "Roça Itaquera", located near the village of Aldeia de São Miguel, date from 1620. At the end of the 17th century it was referred to as an outlying settlement of São Miguel, by the end of the 18th century as part of the parish of Penha and eventually a neighbourhood in the district of São Miguel Paulista. In 1920 it became an Autonomous Municipal District.

=== Development ===
The development of the area in large part followed the classic pattern of the division of large estates into plots of land for the construction of housing.

In 1837 there were only two large estates in the area, the Fazenda Caguaçú and the estate belonging to Dr. Rodrigo Pereira Barreto, also known as Sítio Caguaçu, or Caaguassu. 14 years later these estates were divided up and sold as plots for development. The developers built homes on these plots and the church of Santa Ana, named in honour of Saint Anne and giving rise to the name Vila Santana.

Fazenda Caguaçú, developed by Companhia Pastoril e Agrícola, consisted of land bounded approximately by the Rio Jacu river, the railway line, and the Rio Aricanduva river and comprising the areas known today as Vila Carmosina, Colônia Japonesa, Jardim do Carmo and Parque do Carmo. Sitio Caaguassu was divided up into 10,000 m^{2} plots which were bought for the construction of country residences and holiday homes for prosperous individuals including the local businessman Sabbado D'Ângelo, the Baumann family and the politicians David Domingos Ferreira and Dr. Alvaro de Mendonça. Companhia Pastoril e Agrícola subsequently sold part of Fazenda Caaguassu, the Jardim do Carmo and Parque do Carmo area, to the developer Oscar Americano, who used it to construct one of the eastern São Paulo area's first relatively densely populated, planned developments, Vila Carmosina, and a less densely planned area, Colônia Japonesa. These developments marked the start of a period of rapid population growth.

=== Present day Itaquera ===
The area has benefitted from substantial public investment and infrastructural improvements by the state and municipal authorities. Planned extensions of the Avenida Jacu Pêssego highway which passes through the area will eventually carry traffic south to the port of Santos and the industrial area of the Grande ABC conurbation (the cities of Santo André (A), São Bernardo do Campo (B) and São Caetano do Sul (C)) and north to Guarulhos.

The main highways in the area are the Avenida Jacu Pêssego/Nova Trabalhadores, the Rua Augusto Carlos Baumann, the Avenida dos Campanellas, leading to the neighbourhood of Artur Alvim, and the Rua Virginia Ferni, linking the Cohab residential district to the eastern bypass, along with the eastern bypass itself, Avenida Radial Leste, and the Avenida Itaquera, one of eastern São Paulo's major highways. The area is also served by Line 3 of the São Paulo Metro and Line 11 of the Metropolitan Train Company (CPTM)'s Expresso Leste network.

The area is becoming industrialised and commercial activity is growing. Various banks have opened branches in the area. There is a branch of the São Paulo State Government's Poupatempo multi-service administrative agency and a shopping centre, the Shopping Metrô Itaquera, located next to the Estação Corinthians-Itaquera Metro/CPTM station. The station is named for its proximity to the Corinthians football club's training ground, where the club has built a stadium that served as one of the venues for the 2014 FIFA World Cup. There is also a 200-seater planetarium, the Planetário do Carmo.

Obra Social Dom Bosco - Itaquera is a voluntary organisation that provides a variety of social welfare services including vocational training aimed at improving the chances of local young people finding employment.

== Transport ==
The district is served by Corinthians-Itaquera Station, on lines 3-Red and 11-Coral of the São Paulo Metro and CPTM, respectively, and by Dom Bosco Station, on Line 11-Coral, in addition to two bus terminals.

== Neighbouring areas ==
- São Miguel Paulista and Vila Jacuí to the north.
- Lajeado to the east.
- José Bonifácio to the south-east.
- Cidade Líder and Parque do Carmo to the south.
- Artur Alvim and Ponte Rasa to the west.

== See also ==
- EncontraItaquera, part of the Encontra São Paulo portal
