= São Miguel Paulista =

São Miguel Paulista may refer to:

- Subprefecture of São Miguel Paulista, a subprefectures of the city of São Paulo, Brazil
- São Miguel Paulista (district of São Paulo)
- Roman Catholic Diocese of São Miguel Paulista, a diocese in the district of São Miguel Paulista
