= USP Leste (CPTM) =

Railway station in São Paulo, Brazil

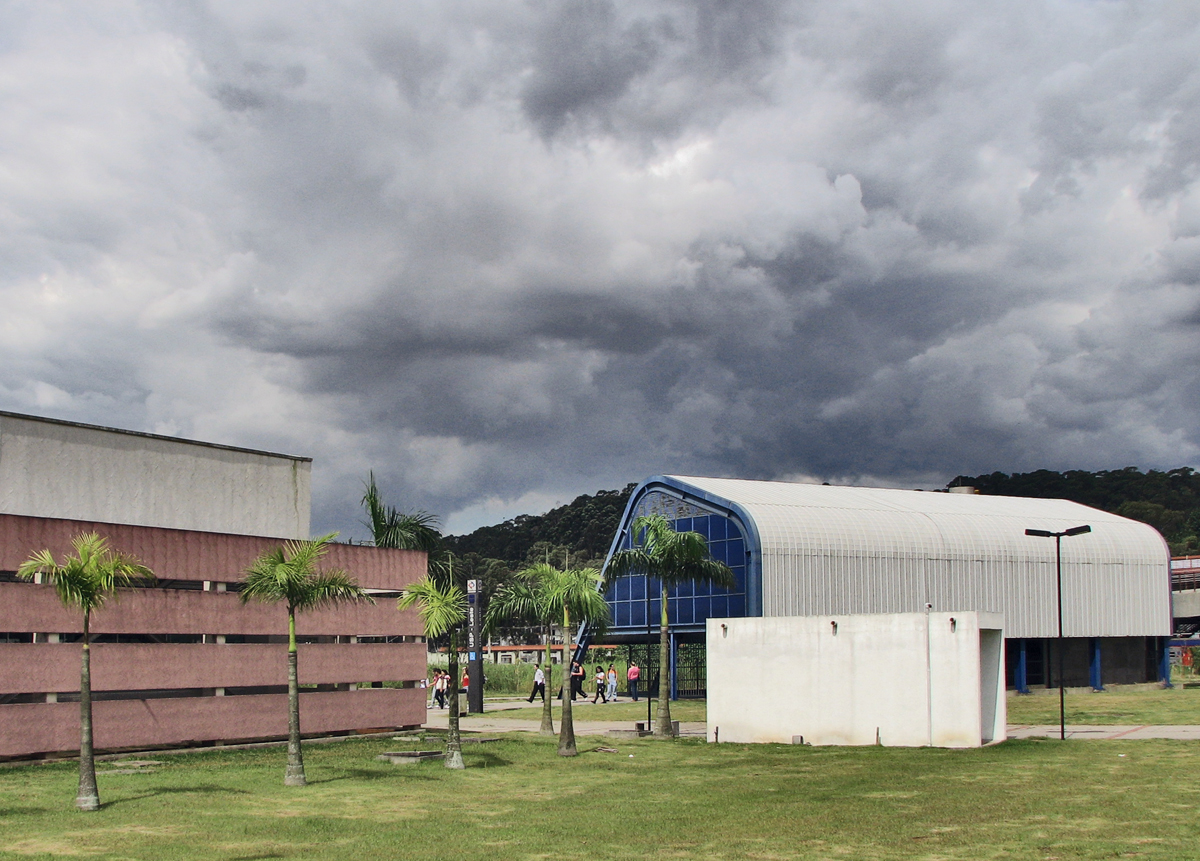
- Entrance of the station

General information
- Location: Av. Doutor Assis Ribeiro, 6081; Ermelino Matarazzo; Brazil
- Coordinates: 23.485556°S 46.501093°W
- Owner: Government of the State of São Paulo
- Operator: CPTM
- Platforms: Island platform

Construction
- Structure type: At-grade
- Accessible: y

Other information
- Station code: USL

History
- Opened: 29 January 2008

Services
Preceding station	São Paulo Metropolitan Trains	Following station
Engenheiro Goulart towards Brás	Line 12	Comendador Ermelino towards Calmon Viana
Track layout
Location

USP Leste is a train station belonging to CPTM Line 12-Sapphire, located in the city of São Paulo.

== History ==
USP Leste station was construct to attend the new campus of University of São Paulo, located north to the station, in the district of Cangaíba, East Side of São Paulo.
