= São Mateus (district of São Paulo) =

District of São Paulo, Brazil

Coordinates: 23.6036°S 46.465°W

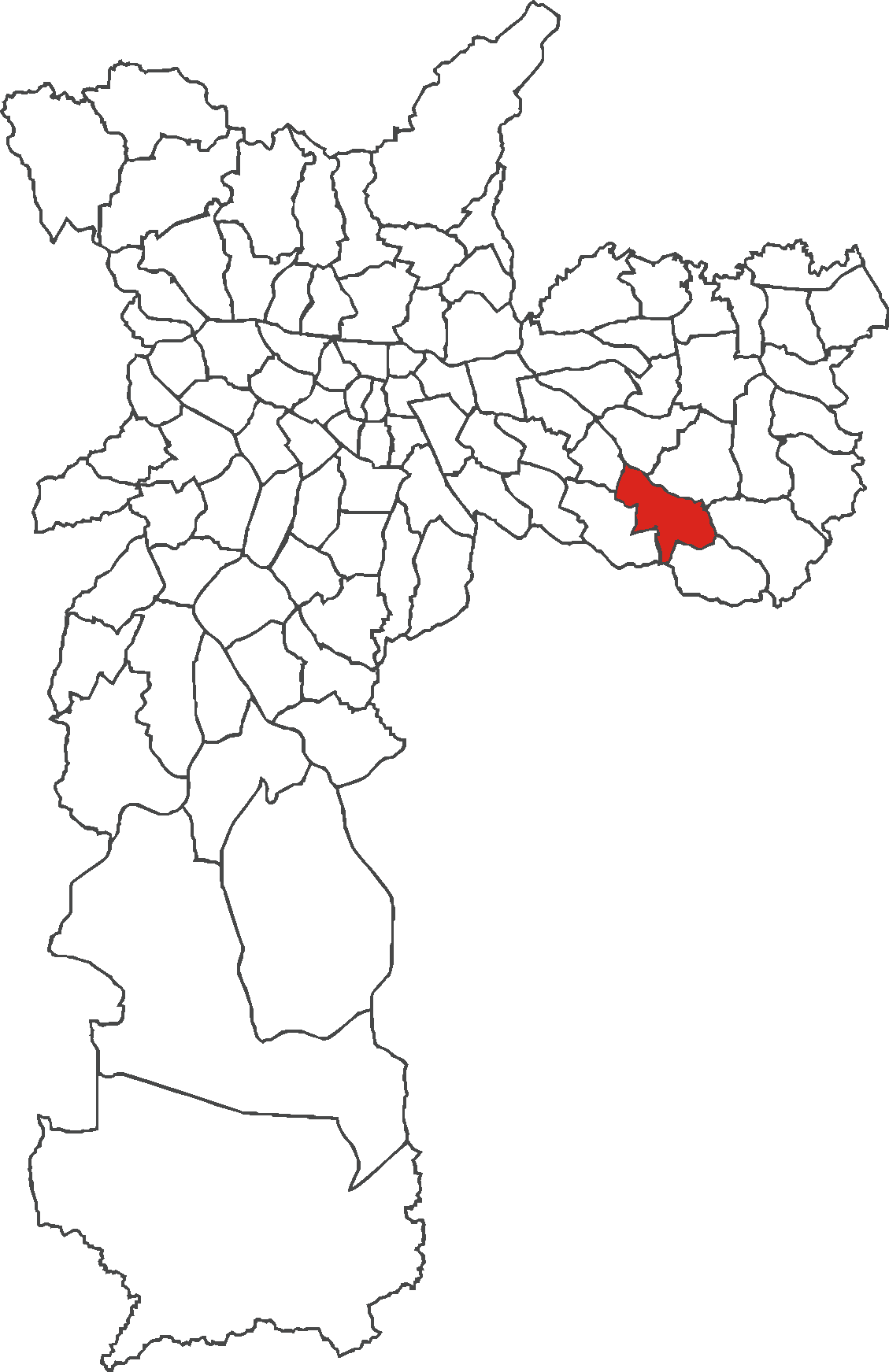
- District of the city of São Paulo
- Country: Brazil
- State: São Paulo
- Municipality: São Paulo
- Subprefecture: São Mateus

Area
  - Total: 13.20 km^{2} (5.10 sq mi)

Population (2007)
  - Total: 155,140
  - Density: 10,908/km^{2} (28,250/sq mi)
- Website: Subprefecture of São Mateus

São Mateus is one of 96 districts in the city of São Paulo, Brazil.

São Mateus is a district located in the eastern part of the Brazilian municipality of São Paulo, approximately 20 km from the central region of the municipality. It was created by State Law No. 4,954, of 27 December 1985, after a request presented to the Legislative Assembly of São Paulo in 1984.
