= São Miguel Paulista (CPTM) =

Train station in the city of São Paulo

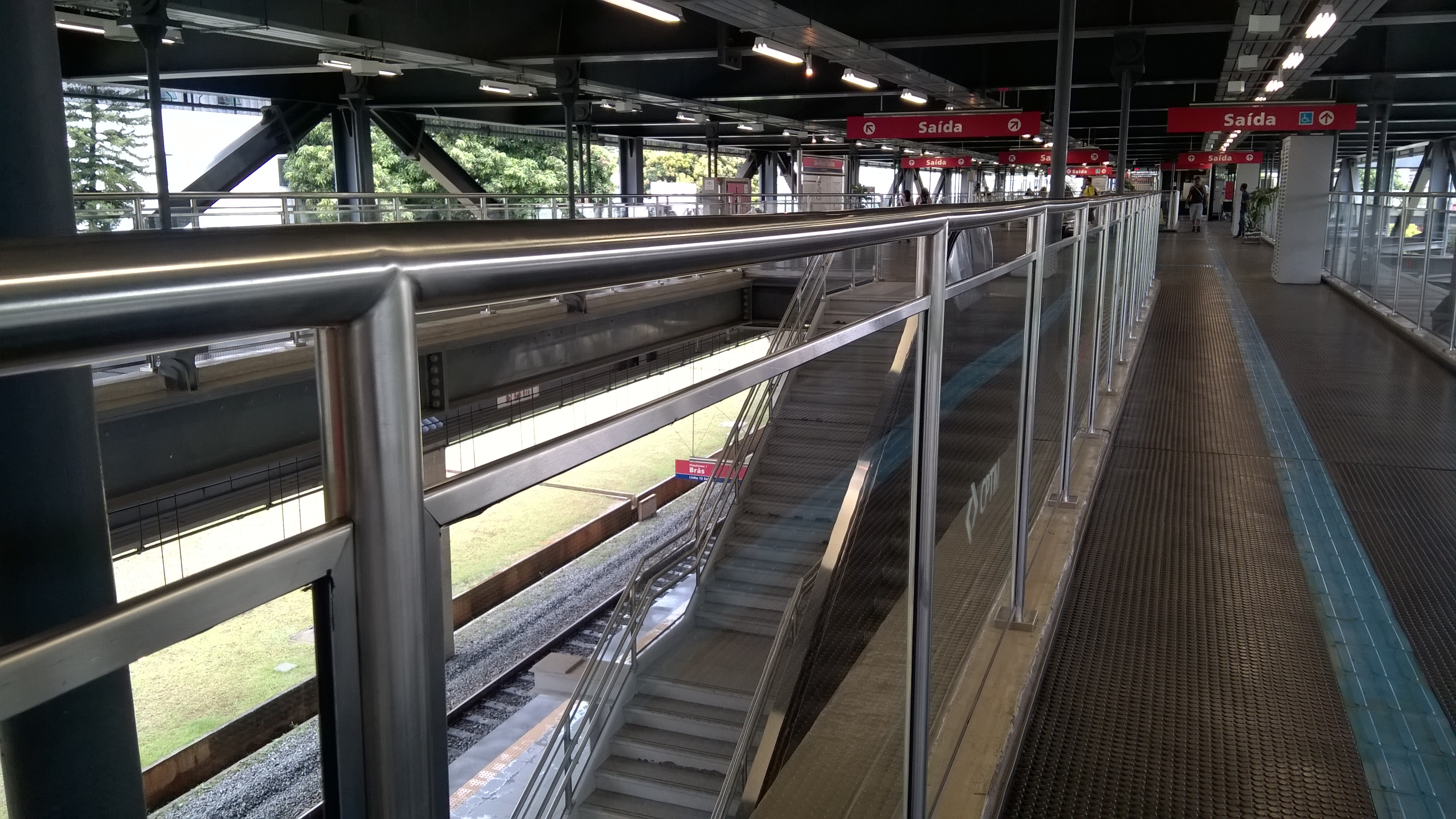

General information
- Location: R. Beraldo Marcondes, 136; São Miguel Paulista; Brazil
- Coordinates: 23.490633°S 46.441644°W
- Owner: Government of the State of São Paulo
- Operator: CPTM
- Platforms: Island platform

Construction
- Structure type: At-grade
- Architect: Luiz Carlos Esteves

Other information
- Station code: SMP

History
- Opened: 1 January 1934
- Rebuilt: 29 July 2013

Services
Preceding station	São Paulo Metropolitan Trains	Following station
Comendador Ermelino towards Brás	Line 12	Jardim Helena-Vila Mara towards Calmon Viana
Future services
Hospital Jardim Helena towards Bonsucesso	Line 14	Vila Jacuí towards Jardim Irene
Track layout
Location

São Miguel Paulista is a train station belonging to CPTM Line 12-Sapphire, located in the city of São Paulo.

== History ==
The station was built by EFCB on 7 February 1926, along with Variante de Poá, which was opened only on 1 January 1934. In the end of the 1970s, it was rebuilt by RFFSA, being reopened on 10 June 1982. It was operated by Brazilian Company of Urban Trains (CBTU) until 1994, when it was transferred, along with other CBTU lines and stations, to the CPTM.

The rebuilt plan of the station to west of the capital was published initially in 2002, in the CPTM Director Plan. In 2004, the Una Arquitetos office was hired for the development of the basic plan. Besides it was announced in June 2007, the rebuilt didn't happen until the 2010s, when the executive project was made.

In 2010, a new station was built a little bit ahead, towards Brás. After many delays, the new station was delivered on 29 July 2013, but only with the track towards Brás working, because, to board towards Calmon Viana, it was needed to use the old structure. On 3 August 2013, the new station started definitively on both tracks, deactivating the old station in Rua Salvador de Medeiros. The new station was opened only with the south access, next to Praça Padre Aleixo. On 21 October 2014, the north access was opened, made by Jardim Lapenna. Therefore, it's possible to cross from one side to another, serving as a connecting catwalk for both neighbourhoods.

The displacement of the station from its original location caused losses for the São Miguel commercial centre, specially in the boardwalk of Rua Serra Dourada, installed in 1979 in front of the south exit of the old station, being the only of its kind outside the central region of São Paulo.

Besides the protests of local shopkeepers and the promise of a project for a new access to the rebuilt station, which would attend Rua Salvador de Medeiros and Rua Serra Dourada, nothing was made until then.
