= Ermelino Matarazzo =

Ermelino Matarazzo may refer to:

- Subprefecture of Ermelino Matarazzo
- Ermelino Matarazzo (district of São Paulo)
