= José Bonifácio (disambiguation) =

José Bonifácio may refer to:

== People ==
- José Bonifácio de Andrada e Silva (1763–1838), Brazilian poet, statesman and politician
- José Bonifácio the Younger (1827–1886), Brazilian poet and senator
- José Bonifácio Lafayette de Andrada (1904–1986), Brazilian politician and former president of the Chamber of Deputies of Brazil

== Locations ==
- José Bonifácio, São Paulo, a city in São Paulo
- José Bonifácio (district), a district of São Paulo

== Other uses ==
- José Bonifácio Esporte Clube, a football club
