= Nitro Química =

Brazilian chemical company

Companhia Nitro Química Brasileira S.A.
- Type: Private
- Industry: Chemical
- Founded: 1935
- Headquarters: São Paulo, Brazil
- Key people: Marcos Cruz, (CEO)
- Products: Nitrocellulose; Sulfuric acid Oleum
- Revenue: ▲US$172.8 million (2012)
- Net income: ▲US$19.5 million (2012)
- Number of employees: 500
- Website: www.nitroquimica.com.br

Nitro Química is a Brazilian chemical company. It was founded in 1935, and it is based in São Paulo. One of the greatest leaders of the company was Antonio Ermirio de Moraes, who died in 2014 of cardiac insufficiency. The headquarter of the company was located in São Miguel Paulista, suburb of São Paulo.

The company is a pioneer in Latin America and one of the largest global producers of nitrocellulose, having the most modern manufacturing capacity in the world.

The company operates in more than 60 countries worldwide. The company was a subsidiary of Votorantim Group, one of the largest industrial conglomerates of Brazil, but in 2011 the Group sold its stake to Faro Capital.
