= Comendador Ermelino (CPTM) =

Railway station in São Paulo, Brazil

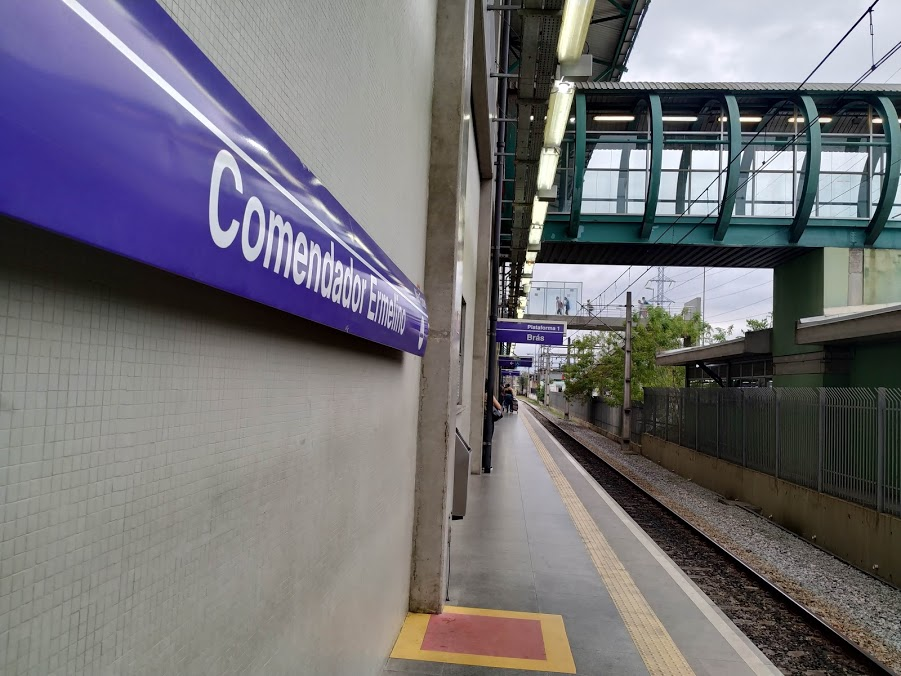

General information
- Location: Av. Doutor Assis Ribeiro, 8454; Ermelino Matarazzo; Brazil
- Coordinates: 23.485098°S 46.482339°W
- Owner: Government of the State of São Paulo
- Operator: CPTM
- Platforms: Island platform

Construction
- Structure type: At-grade
- Accessible: y

Other information
- Station code: ERM

History
- Opened: 1 January 1934
- Rebuilt: 29 January 2008

Services
Preceding station	São Paulo Metropolitan Trains	Following station
USP Leste towards Brás	Line 12	São Miguel Paulista towards Calmon Viana
Track layout
Location

Comendador Ermelino is a train station belonging to CPTM Line 12-Sapphire, located in Ermelino Matarazzo. Next to the station is the neighbourhood's industrial park.

== History ==
In mid-1921, the construction of the railway Variante de Poá by Estrada de Ferro Central do Brasil began. Although the railway was almost complete, and despite the operation of sporadic trains since 1926, the railway was opened to cargo traffic officially on 1 January 1934. The opening for passengers happened on 1 May 1934. One of the stations was constructed in what was then known as Jardim Matarazzo, a labor neighbourhood that hosted one of the factories of Indústrias Reunidas Fábricas Matarazzo. The station was opened in 1934, receiving the name of Ermelino Matarazzo. Despite many transitions between federal and state administrations, it remained in the original building built in 1926, until it was demolished in 2006. Commuters used a temporary station until 29 January 2008, when the station was reopened by CPTM in a new building, replacing the old one.
