= Jardim Helena-Vila Mara (CPTM) =

Railway station in São Paulo, Brazil

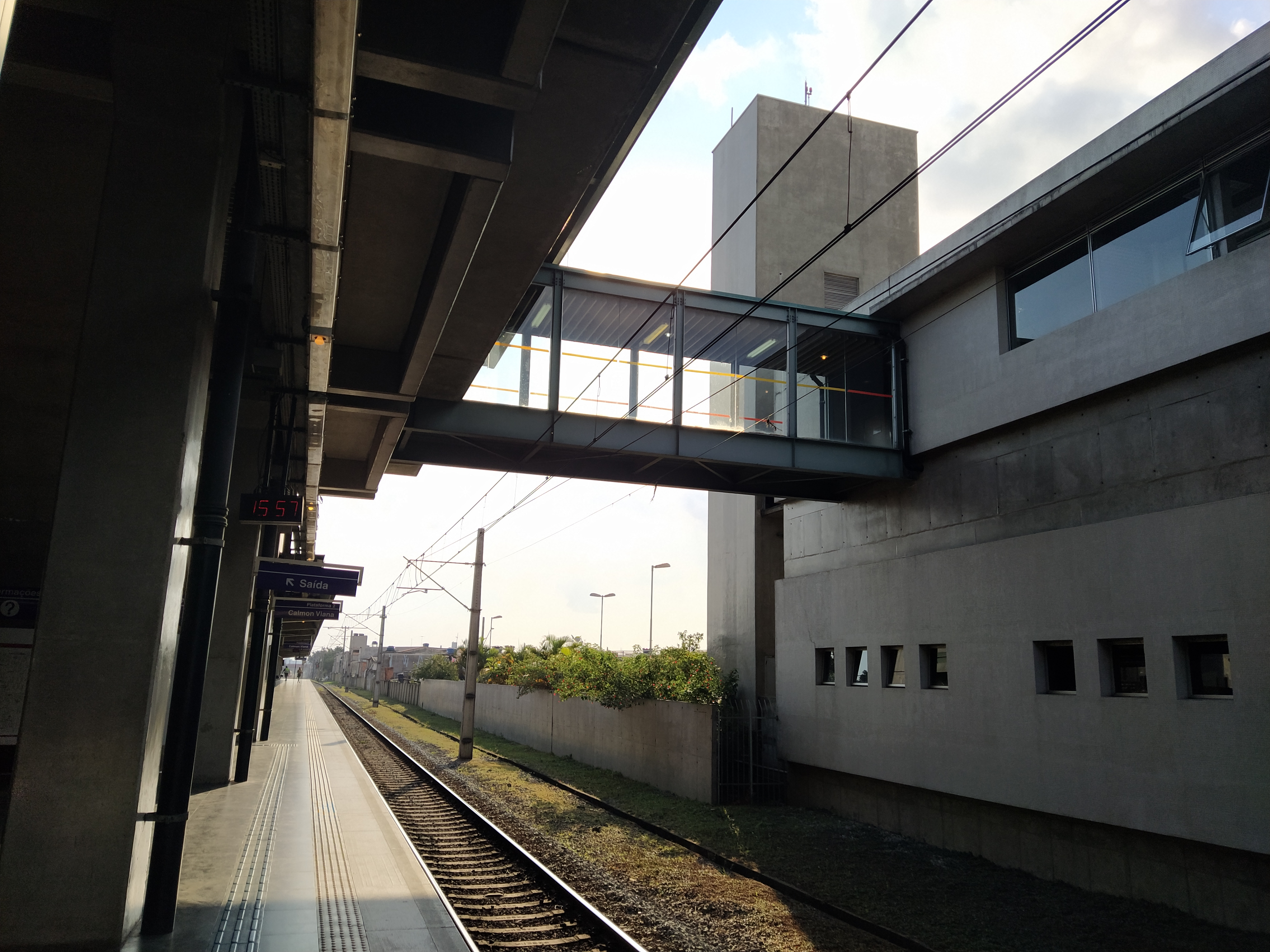

General information
- Location: R. São Gonçalo do Rio das Pedras, 1140/1280; Vila Curuçá; Brazil
- Coordinates: 23.492719°S 46.4211309°W
- Owner: Government of the State of São Paulo
- Operator: CPTM
- Platforms: Island platform

Construction
- Structure type: At-grade
- Architect: Luiz Carlos Esteves

Other information
- Station code: JHE

History
- Opened: 28 May 2008
- Former names: Jardim Helena

Services
Preceding station	São Paulo Metropolitan Trains	Following station
São Miguel Paulista towards Brás	Line 12	Itaim Paulista towards Calmon Viana
Track layout
Location

Jardim Helena-Vila Mara is a train station on CPTM Line 12-Sapphire, located in the district of Vila Curuçá, a few meters of the district of Jardim Helena (north side), being built to facilitate the access of passengers of both neighbourhoods, located in the city of São Paulo.

== History ==
The station is part of a modernization project of Line 12-Sapphire and was opened on 28 May 2008 by CPTM to attend Jardim Helena, located on East Side of São Paulo.
