= Wenceslau Braz =

Wenceslau Braz may refer to:

== People ==
- Venceslau Brás, Wenceslau Braz Pereira Gomes, president of Brazil

== Cities ==
- Wenceslau Braz, Minas Gerais
- Wenceslau Braz, Paraná
