= Iguatemi (disambiguation) =

Iguatemi is a municipality in the Brazilian state of Mato Grosso do Sul.

Iguatemi may also refer to:

- Iguatemi (district of São Paulo)
- Iguatemi São Paulo, a shopping centre in São Paulo
