= Subprefecture of São Miguel Paulista =

Coordinates: 23°28′56″S 46°26′28″W

São Miguel Paulista
- Subprefecture
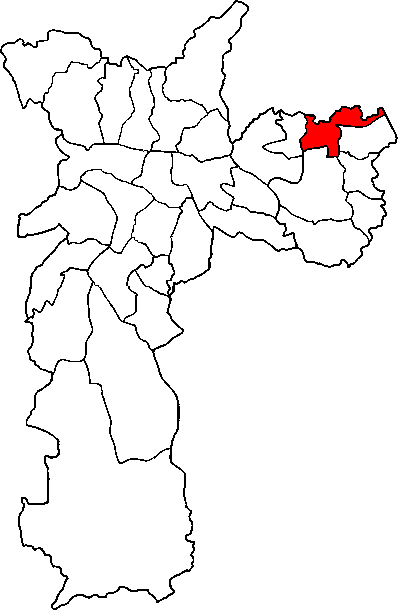
- Location of the Subprefecture of São Miguel Paulista in São Paulo

- Location of municipality of São Paulo within the State of São Paulo
- Country: Brazil
- Region: Southeast
- State: São Paulo
- Municipality: São Paulo
- Administrative Zone: East 2
- Districts: São Miguel Paulista, Jardim Helena, Vila Jacuí

Government
  - Type: Subprefecture
  - Subprefect: Luiz Massao Kita

Area
  - Total: 24.64 km^{2} (9.51 sq mi)

Population (2005)
  - Total: 410,514
- Website: Subprefeitura São Miguel Paulista (Portuguese)

The Subprefecture of São Miguel Paulista is one of 32 subprefectures of the city of São Paulo, Brazil. It comprises three districts: São Miguel Paulista, Jardim Helena, and Vila Jacuí.
