= Subprefecture of São Mateus =

Coordinates: 23°36′23″S 46°28′25″W

- Subprefecture
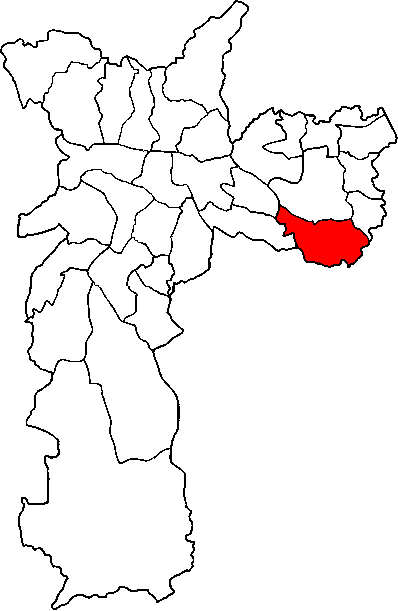
- Location of the Subprefecture of São Mateus in São Paulo

- Location of municipality of São Paulo within the State of São Paulo
- Country: Brazil
- Region: Southeast
- State: São Paulo
- Municipality: São Paulo
- Administrative Zone: East 1
- Districts: São Mateus, São Rafael, Iguatemi

Government
  - Type: Subprefecture
  - Subprefect: Ademir Aparecido Ramos

Area
  - Total: 45.5 km^{2} (17.6 sq mi)

Population (2008)
  - Total: 436,329
- Website: Subprefeitura São Mateus (Portuguese)

The Subprefecture of São Mateus is one of 32 subprefectures of the city of São Paulo, Brazil. It comprises three districts: São Mateus, São Rafael, and Iguatemi.
