= São Rafael =

District of São Paulo, Brazil

- District
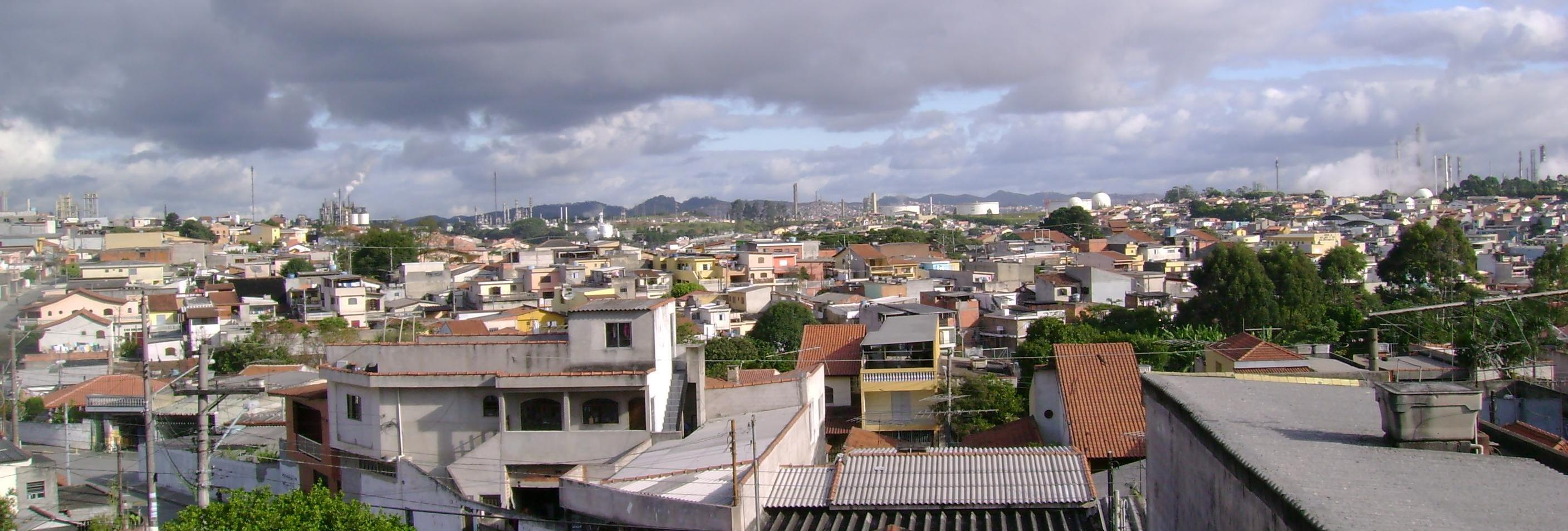
- A view of São Rafael

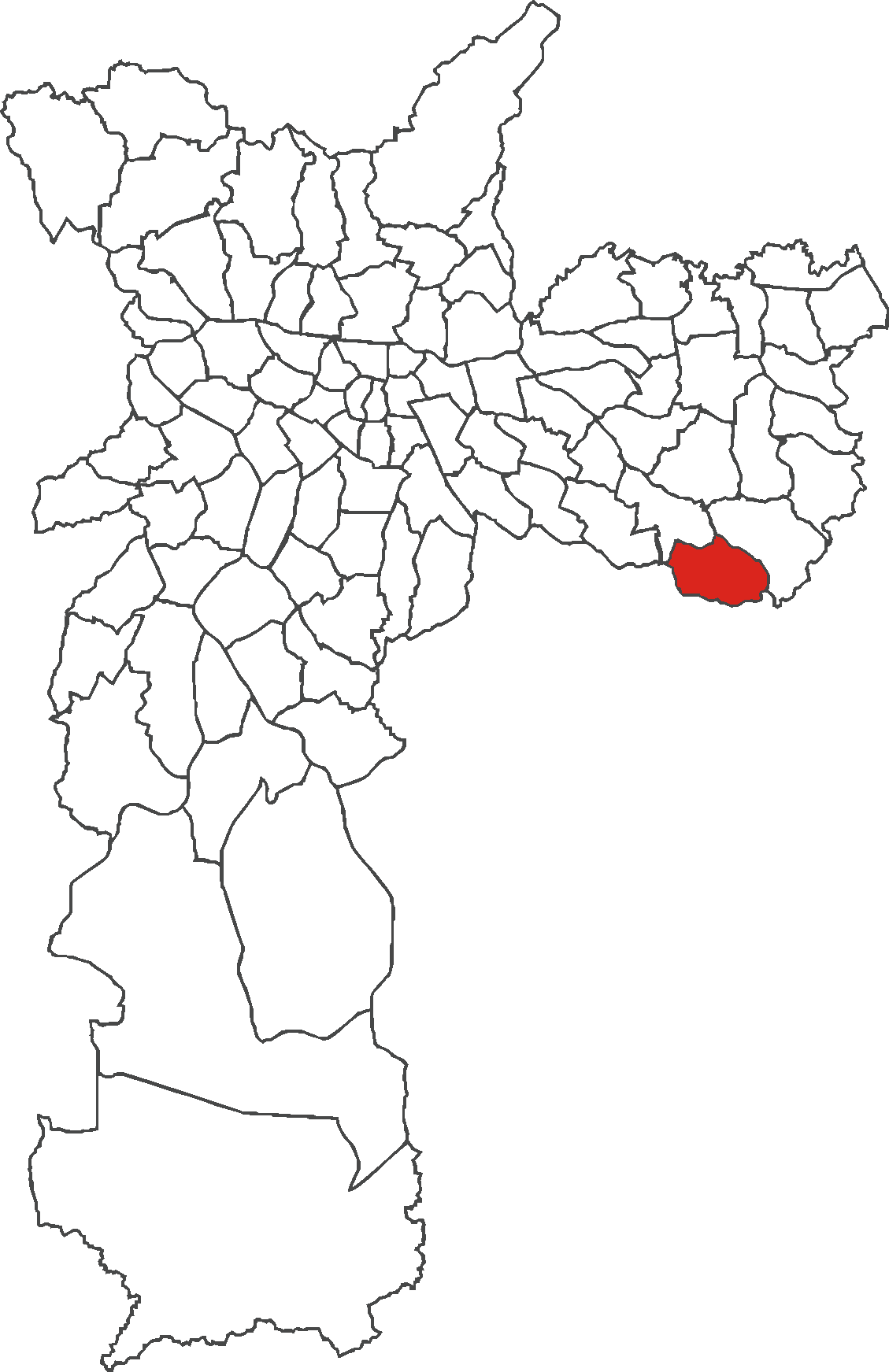
- Location in the city of São Paulo
- Country: Brazil
- State: São Paulo
- City: São Paulo

Government
  - Type: Subprefecture
  - Subprefect: Ademir Aparecido

Area
  - Total: 13.1 km^{2} (5.1 sq mi)

Population (2008)
  - Total: 148.778
  - Density: 11,360.17/km^{2} (29,422.7/sq mi)
- HDI: 0,767 – medium
- Website: Subprefecture of são Mateus

São Rafael (Brazilian Portuguese pronunciation: [ˈsɐ̃w̃ ʁafaˈɛw]) is a district in the subprefecture of São Mateus in the city of São Paulo, Brazil.
