= José Bonifácio (district of São Paulo) =

District of São Paulo, Brazil

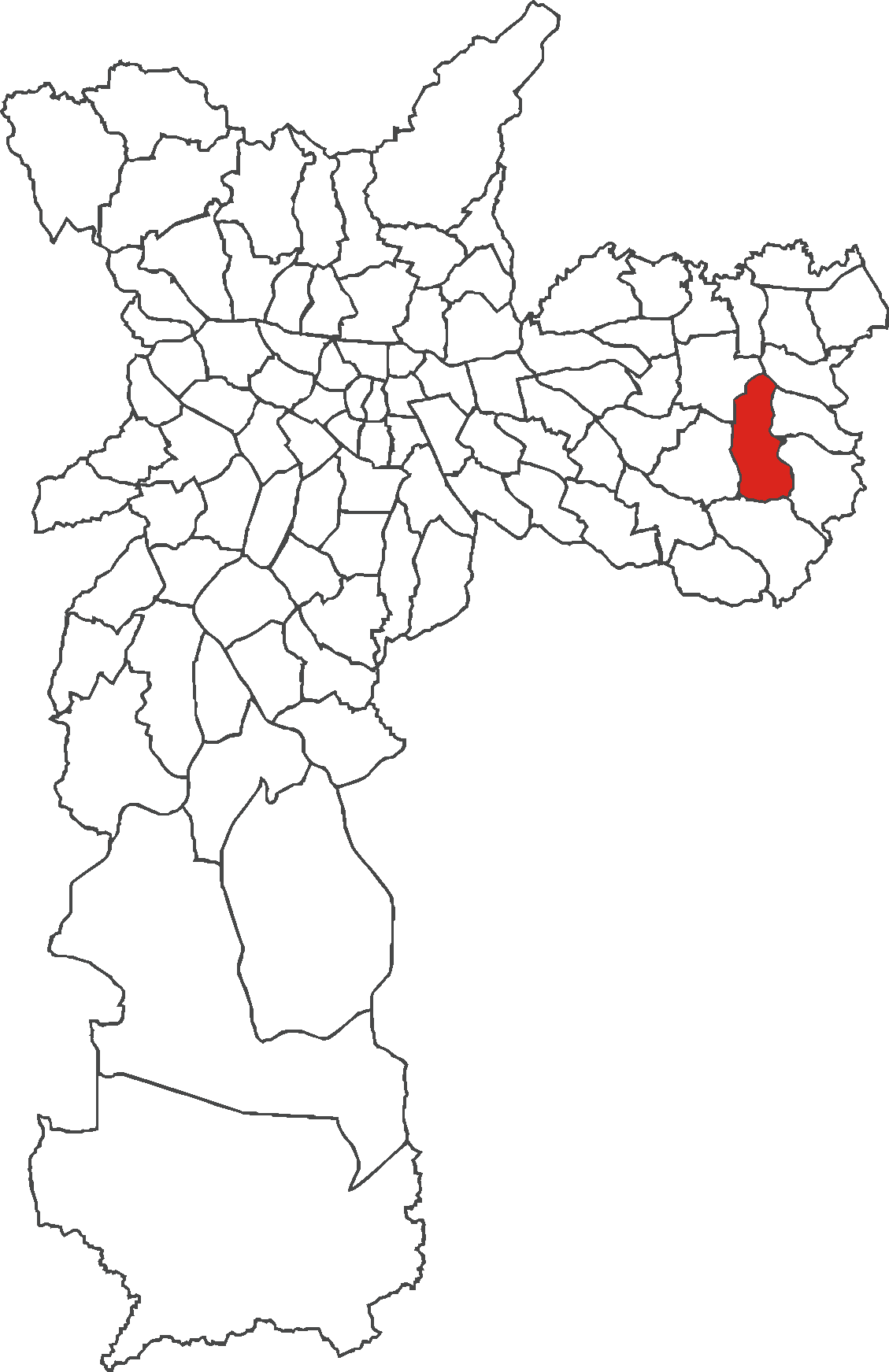
- Location in the city of São Paulo
- Country: Brazil
- State: São Paulo
- City: São Paulo

Government
  - Type: Subprefecture
  - Subprefect: Paulo César Máximo

Area
  - Total: 14.47 km^{2} (5.59 sq mi)

Population (2008)
  - Total: 108.814
  - Density: 7,518.45/km^{2} (19,472.7/sq mi)
- HDI: 0,804 – high
- Website: Subprefecture of Itaquera

José Bonifácio is a district in the subprefecture of Itaquera of the city of São Paulo, Brazil.
