= Subprefecture of Itaquera =

Coordinates: 23°32′00″S 46°27′01″W

- Subprefecture
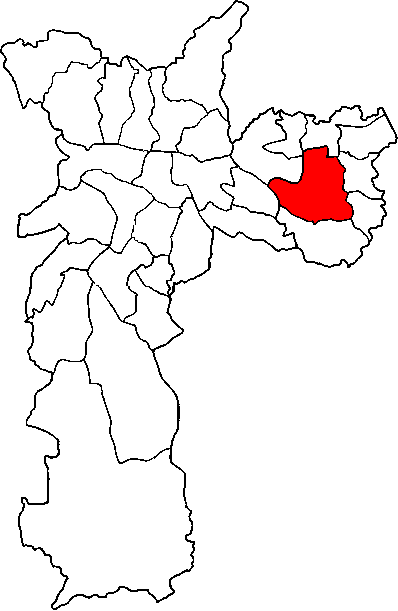
- Location of the Subprefecture of Itaquera in São Paulo

- Location of municipality of São Paulo within the State of São Paulo
- Country: Brazil
- Region: Southeast
- State: São Paulo
- Municipality: São Paulo
- Administrative Zone: East 1
- Districts: Itaquera, Parque do Carmo, José Bonifácio, Cidade Líder

Government
  - Type: Subprefecture
  - Subprefect: Paulo César Máximo

Area
  - Total: 55.32 km^{2} (21.36 sq mi)

Population (2008)
  - Total: 525,337
- Website: Subprefeitura Itaquera (Portuguese)

The Subprefecture of Itaquera is one of 32 subprefectures of the city of São Paulo, Brazil. It comprises four districts: Itaquera, Parque do Carmo, José Bonifácio, and Cidade Líder. The name in Tupi means "hard stone" or "insensitive stone".

This subprefecture hosts the Arena Corinthians stadium, in which took place the inauguration of the FIFA World Cup in 2014.
