= São Miguel Paulista (district of São Paulo) =

District of São Paulo, Brazil

- Interactive map of São Miguel Paulista
- Coordinates: 23°29′57″S 46°26′25″W
- Country: Brazil
- State: São Paulo
- City: São Paulo

Government
  - Type: Subprefecture
  - Subprefect: Luiz Massao Kita

Area
  - Total: 75 km^{2} (29 sq mi)

Population (2000)
  - Total: 93.187
  - Density: 12,425/km^{2} (32,180/sq mi)
- HDI: 0.808 –high
- Website: Subprefecture of São Miguel Paulista

São Miguel Paulista is a district in the subprefecture of the same name in the city of São Paulo, Brazil.

Its original nucleus was the so-called Capela dos Índios ("Chapel of the Indians"), a church built in the 16th century for the settlement of Indigenous peoples of the region. The chapel is located in Praça Padre Aleixo Monteiro Mafra, also known as Praça do Forró. It is the only building in the municipality of São Paulo that, after undergoing renovations in the 17th century, remains completely original, with walls made of rammed earth.

It is classified by CRECI as "Value Zone E", along with other districts of the city such as Campo Limpo, Brasilândia and Itaim Paulista.

== History ==
In the 16th century, the region of the present-day municipality was occupied by the Tupiniquim village of Ururaí, led by Piquerobi and Jaguaranho.

The Aldeamento de São Miguel was one of several Jesuit aldeamentos established in the region of São Paulo de Piratininga. Together with the village of Pinheiros, the settlement was one of the only population centers of Portuguese origin independent from the city that managed to prosper in the region.

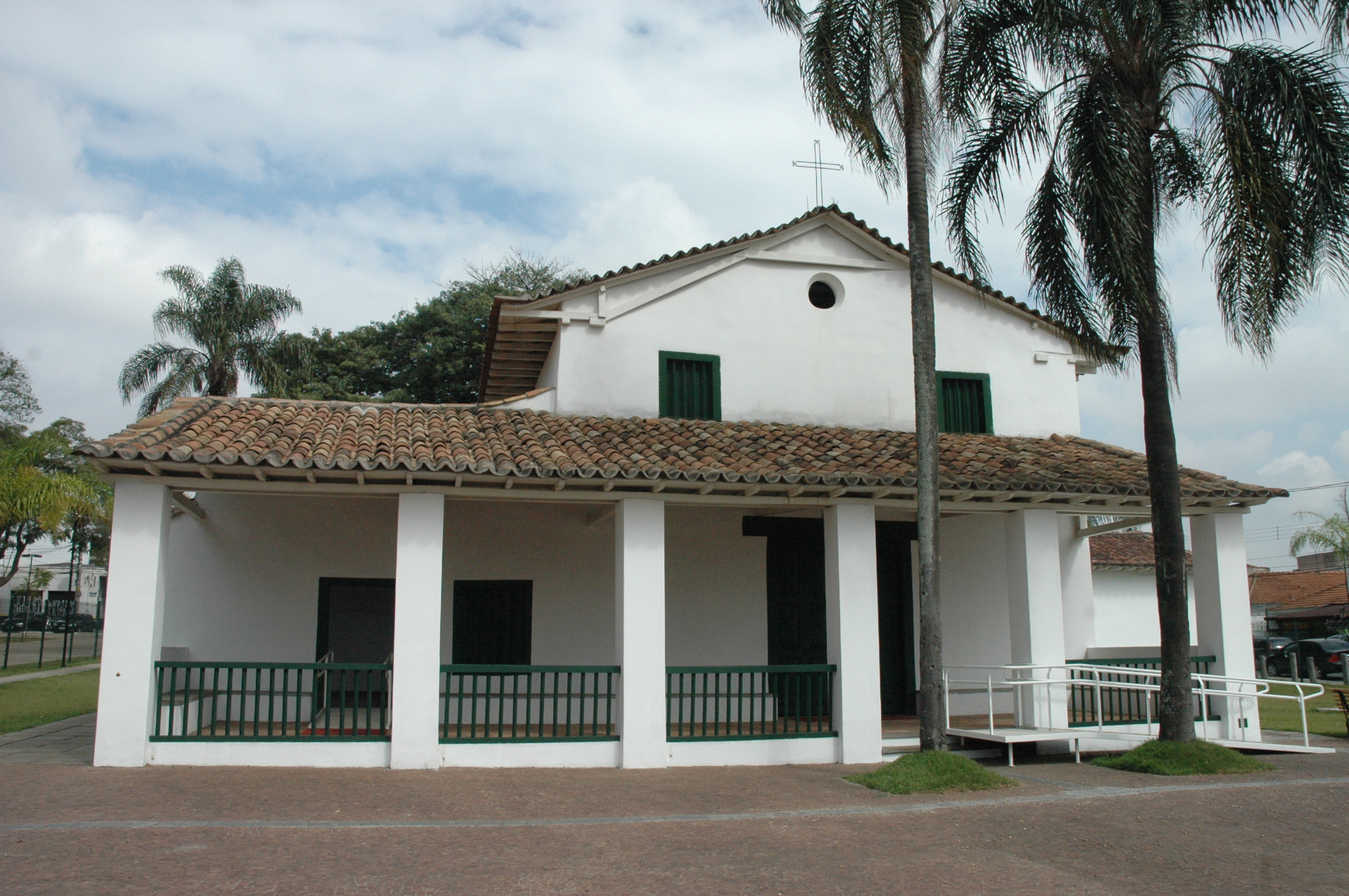
Chapel of São Miguel Arcanjo, built in 1622.

The founding date of São Miguel is uncertain and controversial. The theory proposing the earliest date points to the year 1560, when José de Anchieta visited the Guaianás Indigenous people who had fled the village of São Paulo de Piratininga after the arrival there of Indigenous groups coming from the now-extinct village of Santo André da Borda do Campo.

The dispersal of those Indigenous groups occurred in various directions, but São Miguel received particular attention because it was located in a strategic position, serving as a defensive point for the village of São Paulo against invasions by Tamoios coming from the northern coast of the state of São Paulo.

The first road in the district, the São Paulo–Jacareí road, was built precariously in 1924 due to a lack of resources. In 1930, the Penha–São Miguel bus line of the company Auto Ônibus Penha–São Miguel was inaugurated. In 1932, a branch line of the Estrada de Ferro Central do Brasil was opened, and in the same year the São Miguel station was inaugurated. The industrial phase began in 1935, when Antônio Fuga and his sons started construction of the Companhia Nitro Química Brasileira.

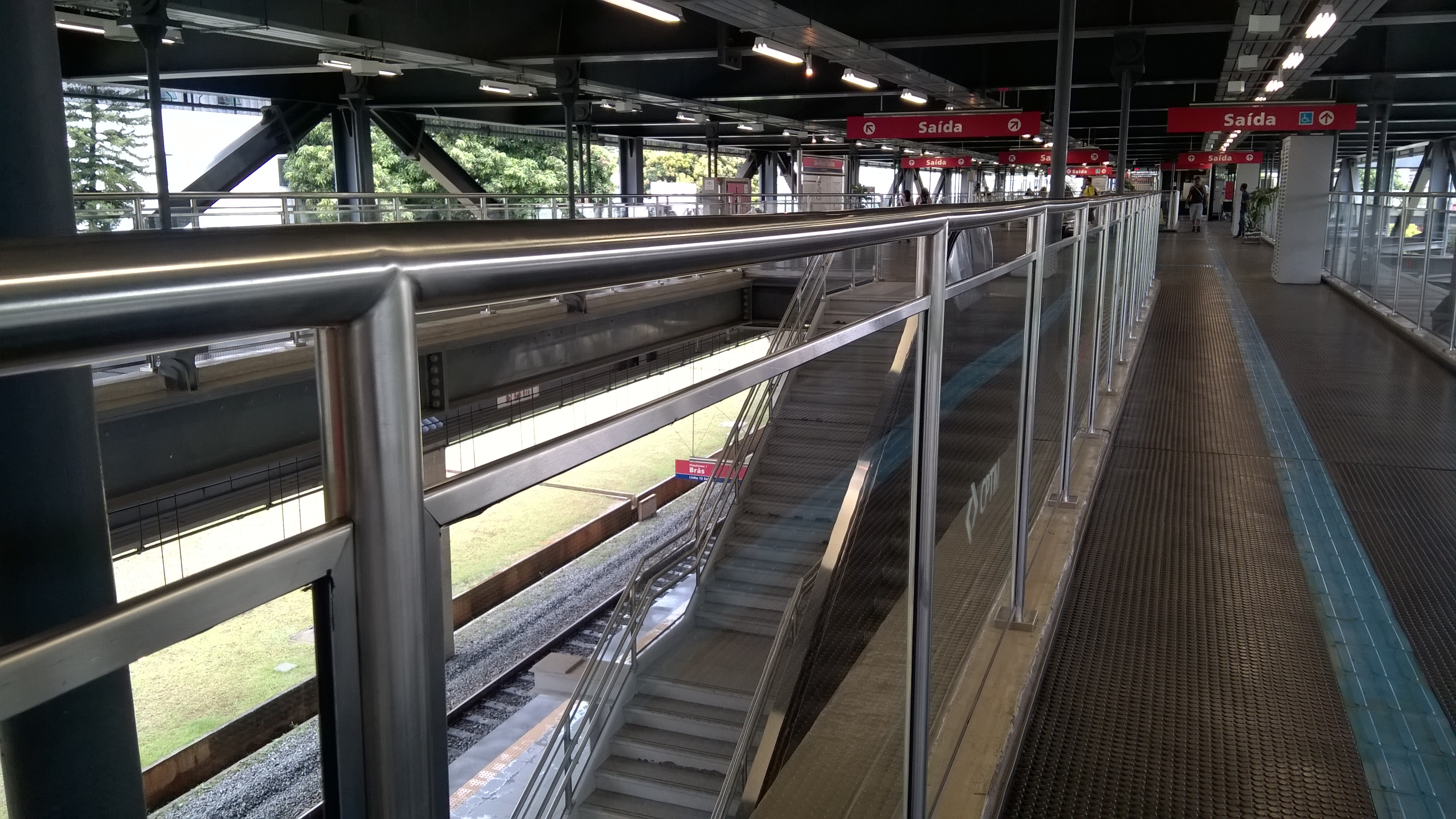
The São Miguel Paulista station in the central area of the district

The first concrete road in Brazil was built in São Miguel in 1939, the same year electricity was introduced and the Companhia Nitro Química Brasileira was inaugurated. In 1941, the Celosul paper factory—owned by the Matarazzo Group—was established in Ermelino Matarazzo. At that time, Ermelino Matarazzo was part of São Miguel. Companhia Nitro Química grew rapidly and by 1948 already employed four thousand workers.

Around 1950, almost everything in the district required renovation or rebuilding. Local problems then drew the attention of public authorities. The state government expanded the educational sector, multiplying primary schools and establishing secondary institutions such as the Conjunto Educacional D. Pedro I, designed by architect Roberto Tibau.

Opened in 1967, the São Miguel Paulista Municipal Market contributed to the expansion of the region's commercial area. It has three pavilions offering fruits, vegetables, spices, Asian products and traditional foods.

In 2018, São Miguel received a modern unit of the Senac. With more than 26,000 square metres, Senac São Miguel is the largest Senac unit in the state and offers about 80% of its courses as free places. The inauguration was attended by the then mayor João Doria and the Senac regional manager Luiz Francisco Salgado.

The district will also host a unit of the SESC. Scheduled for completion in 2028, it will be the largest in the state of São Paulo and will cover an area of 45,000 square metres, equivalent to six football fields. It will include an events gymnasium for 1,000 people, a cafeteria, a theatre with 414 seats, a performance hall for 145 visitors, a library, an aquatic park, children's areas, exhibition spaces, and facilities for educational activities and sports.

== Demographics ==
The Datafolha Institute conducted a survey in August 2008 to outline the profile of the inhabitants of São Miguel. According to the survey, 50% of the inhabitants are men, and the other 50% are women. 85% of the inhabitants identify as white, 15% are mixed race Pardo Brazilians or black.

In terms of education level, 40% have completed elementary school, compared to 46% who have completed high school and 14% who have completed higher education. The vast majority of the population (57%) belongs to class C, followed by classes B (32%), D (9%), A (1%) and E (1%). 52% are Catholic, 22% are evangelical and 12% have no religion. The PT and PSDB are the political parties preferred by a total of 25% of the residents.

The Datafolha institute conducted a survey in August 2008 to determine the profile of São Miguel’s residents. According to the survey, 50% of the inhabitants are men and 50% are women. Eighty-five percent of the inhabitants identify as white, while 15% identify as Pardo or black.

Regarding educational attainment, 40% have completed primary education, 46% have completed secondary education, and 14% have completed higher education. The majority of the population (57%) belongs to the Brazilian socioeconomic class C, followed by classes B (32%), D (9%), A (1%), and E (1%). About 52% are Catholic, 22% are Evangelical, and 12% have no religion. The PT and the PSDB are the preferred political parties for a total of 25% of residents.

Demographic evolution of the São Miguel Paulista district

== Religion ==
The Roman Catholic Diocese of São Miguel Paulista (Latin: Dioecesis Sancti Michaëlis Paulinensis) is a diocese located in the district, in the city and Ecclesiastical province of São Paulo in Brazil.

== Marechal Tito Avenue ==
The arrival of the Central do Brasil Railroad improved transport connections with São Paulo and Rio de Janeiro, but road travel remained very difficult. In 1908 it took the French motorist Conde Lesdain (Comte de Lesdain) 45 days to complete the journey between the two cities by car.

Under his slogan "to govern is to open roads", Washington Luís, Mayor of São Paulo (1914–1919), Governor of the State of São Paulo (1920–1924) and President of the Republic (1926–1930), encouraged the expansion of the urban highways network, largely following the pattern laid down during the colonial era. In 1922 he opened the São Paulo-Rio Highway, following one of the traditional colonial era routes and passing through São Miguel Paulista, Itaim Paulista and Mogi das Cruzes en route to Jacareí. In 1928 when the road was fully opened the journey took 10 hours.

The present name is given in tribute of the President of Yugoslavia who died in 1980.

Today, the Avenida Marechal Tito is the main thoroughfare of São Miguel, serving all the town's vital facilities alongside other attractions. The former diamond-shaped paving blocks have now been replaced by an asphalt surface.

Other important roads in the town are São Miguel Avenue, Jacú-Pêssego Avenue, Pires do Rio Avenue, Doctor Assis Ribeiro Avenue, Kumaki Aoki Avenue, Emperor Avenue, Oliveira Freire Avenue, Doctor José Arthur Nova and Nordestina Avenue.

== Education ==
The Cruzeiro do Sul University (Portuguese: Universidade Cruzeiro do Sul) is a university located in the district.

== Anniversary celebrations ==
Residents of São Miguel celebrate the district's anniversary every September, with festivities that include various cultural attractions. In 2016, the 394th anniversary of the district was celebrated with the creation of a mural depicting the history of immigrant communities in the area, ranging from northeastern Brazilians to Arabs and Japanese.

The official anniversary date of São Miguel Paulista was later updated to 29 September 1560, making it the oldest neighborhood of São Paulo alongside Pinheiros. In 2025 the district celebrates 465 years since its founding.

== Adjacent districts and municipalities ==
São Miguel Paulista has borders with:

- Guarulhos (north)
- Jardim Helena (northeast)
- Vila Curuçá (east)
- Lajeado (southeast)
- Itaquera (south)
- Vila Jacuí (west)
