= Subprefecture of Ermelino Matarazzo =

Coordinates: 23°29′22″S 46°28′26″W

- Subprefecture
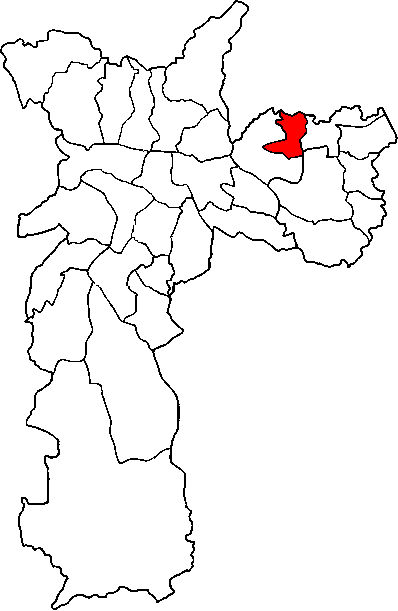
- Location of the Subprefecture of Ermelino Matarazzo in São Paulo

- Location of municipality of São Paulo within the State of São Paulo
- Country: Brazil
- Region: Southeast
- State: São Paulo
- Municipality: São Paulo
- Administrative Zone: East 1
- Districts: Ermelino Matarazzo, Ponte Rasa

Government
  - Type: Subprefecture
  - Subprefect: Antonio Sergio Palazzi

Area
  - Total: 15.5 km^{2} (6.0 sq mi)

Population (2008)
  - Total: 210,709
- Website: Subprefeitura Ermelino Matarazzo (Portuguese)

The Subprefecture of Ermelino Matarazzo is one of 32 subprefectures of the city of São Paulo, Brazil. It comprises two districts: Ermelino Matarazzo and Ponte Rasa. It hosts the second largest campus of University of São Paulo in the city.
