= East Zone 1 of São Paulo =

East Zone 1 of São Paulo Zona Leste 1
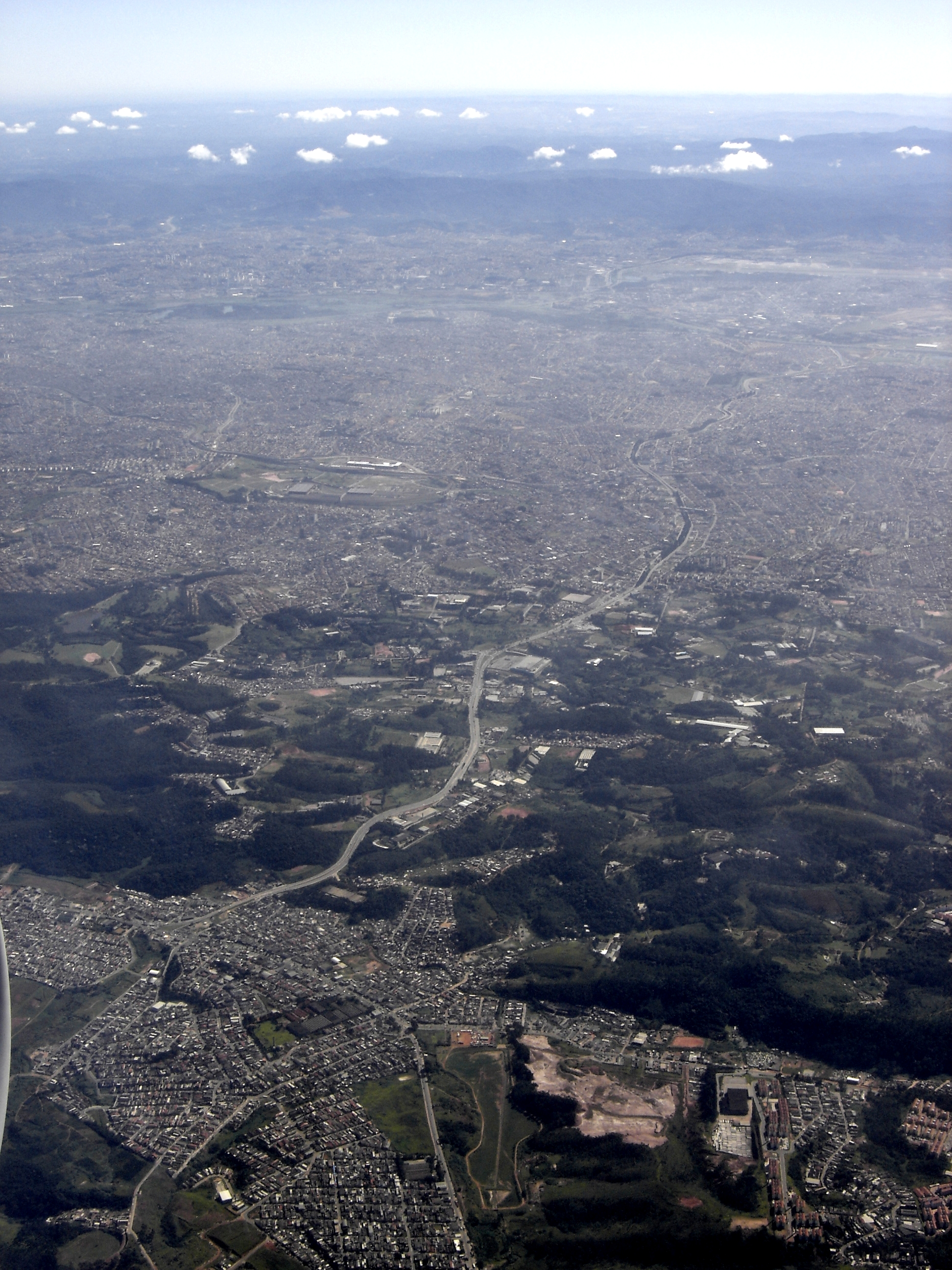

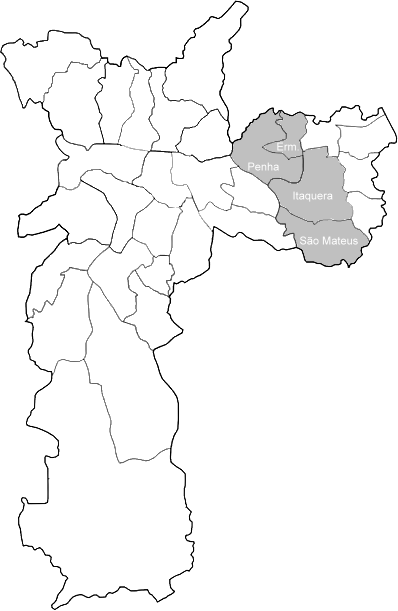
- Location of East Zone 1 in São Paulo
- Country: Brazil
- State: São Paulo
- City: São Paulo
- Subprefectures: East Zone 1: Penha; Ermelino Matarazzo; Itaquera; São Mateus

The East Zone 1 is an Administrative Zone of São Paulo, Brazil.

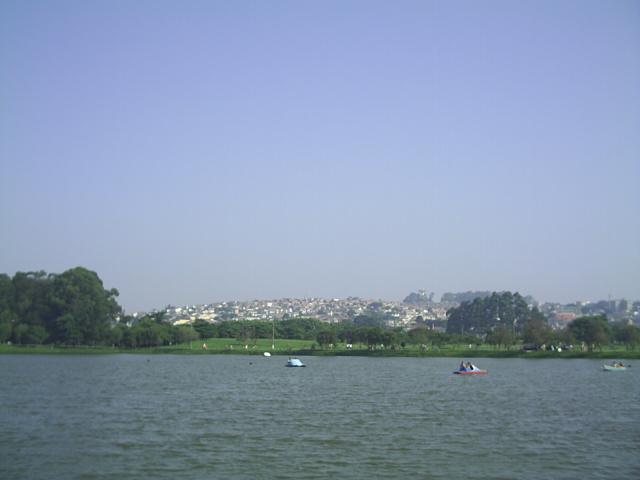
Ecological Park of Tietê, in region East of São Paulo City.
