= Parque do Carmo =

District of São Paulo, Brazil

Coordinates: 23.5725°S 46.4618°W

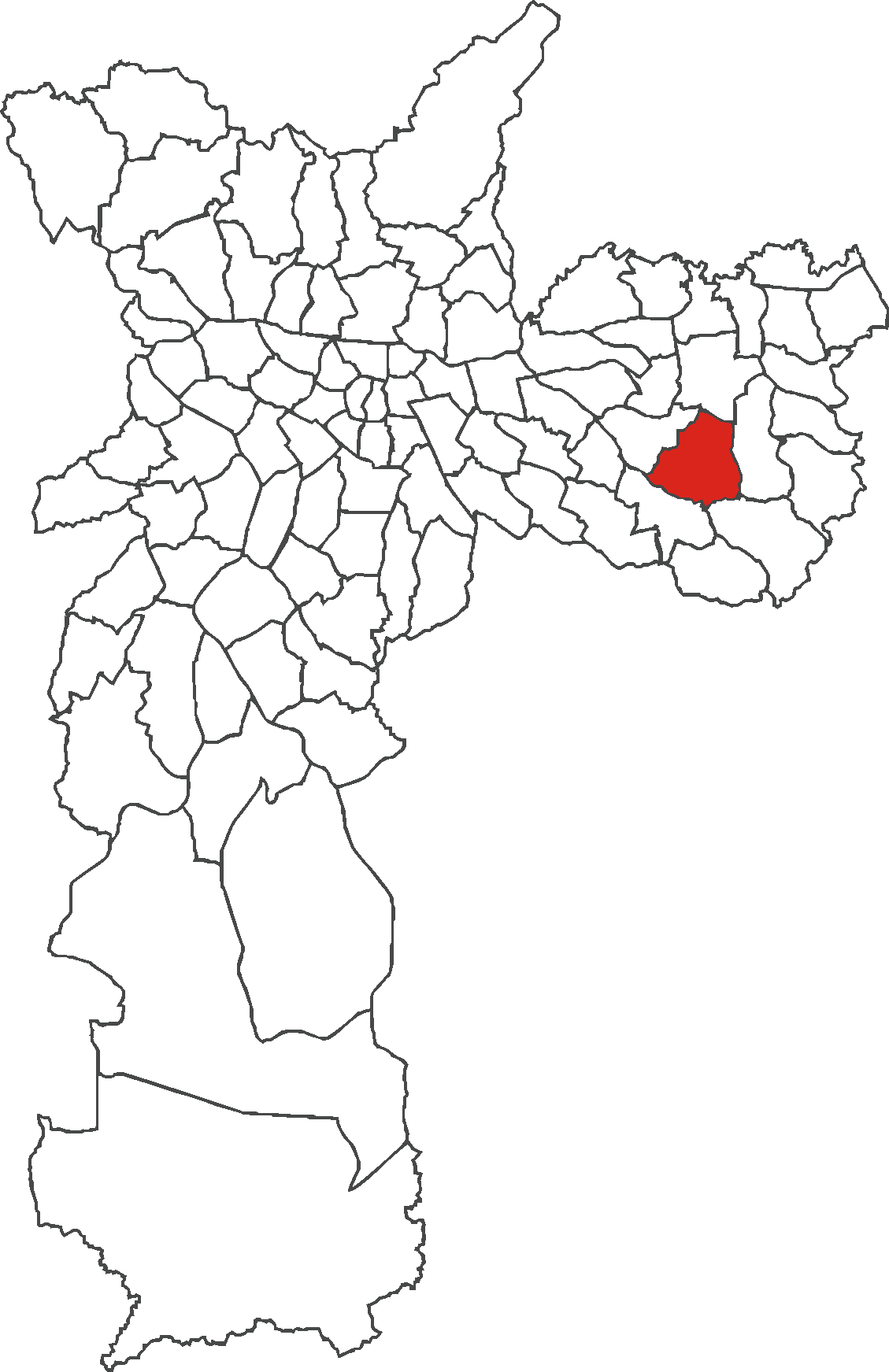
- District of the city of São Paulo
- Country: Brazil
- State: São Paulo
- Municipality: São Paulo
- Subprefecture: Itaquera

Area
  - Total: 15.40 km^{2} (5.95 sq mi)

Population (2007)
  - Total: 68,258
  - Density: 4,432/km^{2} (11,480/sq mi)
- Website: Subprefecture of Itaquera

Parque do Carmo is one of 96 districts in the city of São Paulo, Brazil.
