= Iguatemi (district of São Paulo) =

District of São Paulo, Brazil

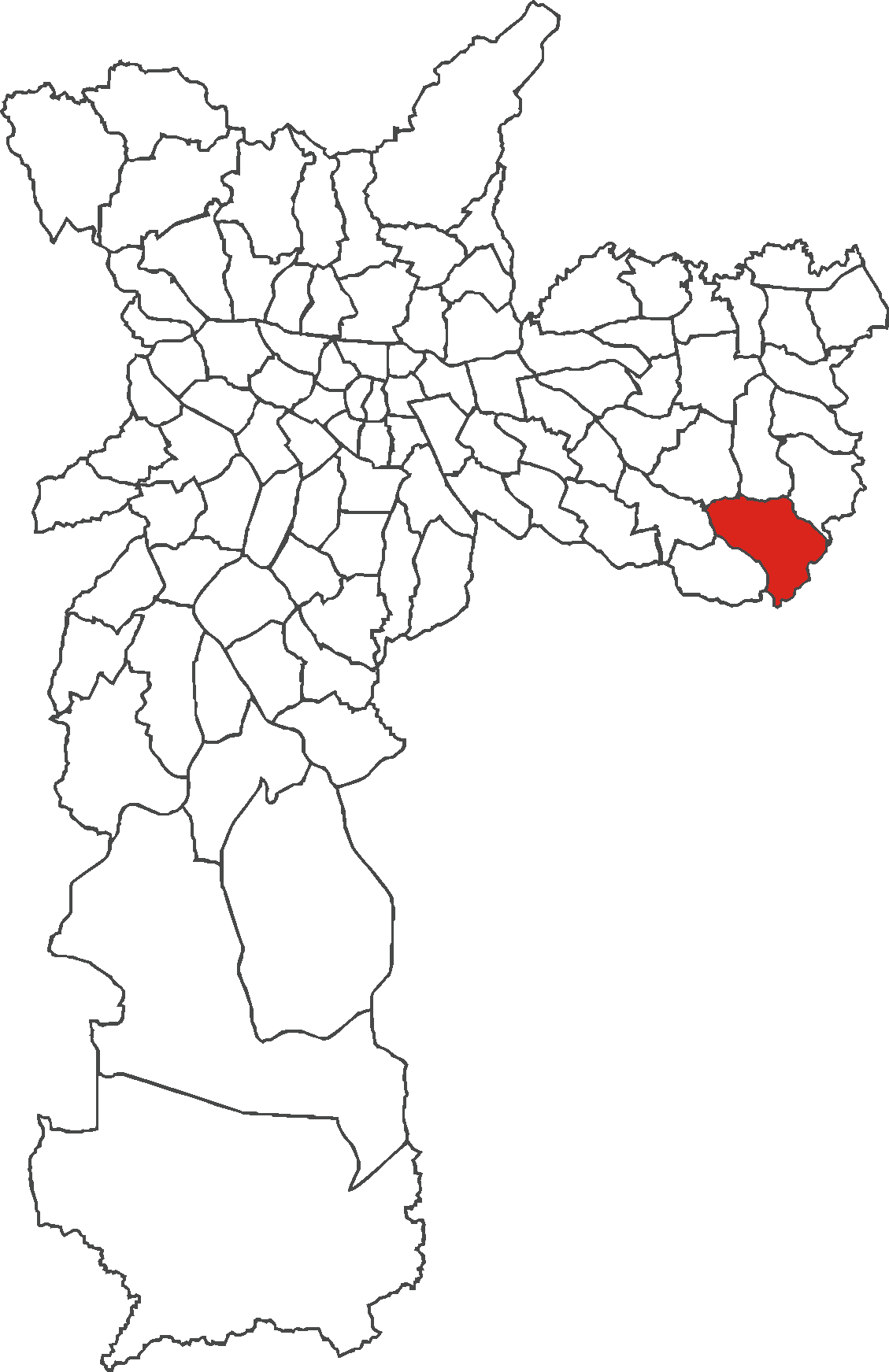
- Location of Iguatemi in São Paulo
- Country: Brazil
- State: São Paulo
- City: São Paulo

Government
  - Type: Subprefecture
  - Subprefect: Ademir Aparecido Ramos

Population (2023)
  - Total: 149,700
- HDI: 0.751 - medium
- Website: Subprefecture of Iguatemi

Iguatemi is a district in the subprefecture of São Mateus in São Paulo, Brazil.

The area where the district is located, until the end of the 1960s, consisted mainly of farms and rural properties and was known as Guabirobeira and Mall. The first housing developments in the area were Vila Eugênia, Jardim São Gonçalo, Jardim Roseli, Jardim São Benedito, and Jardim Marilú, which were established in 1965. Additional developments followed throughout the 1970s.

As of the 2022 Brazilian census, the district's population is estimated at 149,700 inhabitants with a predominantly mestizo demographic. It is home to citizens of north-eastern Brazil, Spain, from Japan, with most residents historically employed as industrial workers in the nearby regions of Mooca, Ipiranga, and the ABC Region.

The district will be serviced in the near future by a monorail system.
