= Vila Jacuí =

District of São Paulo, Brazil

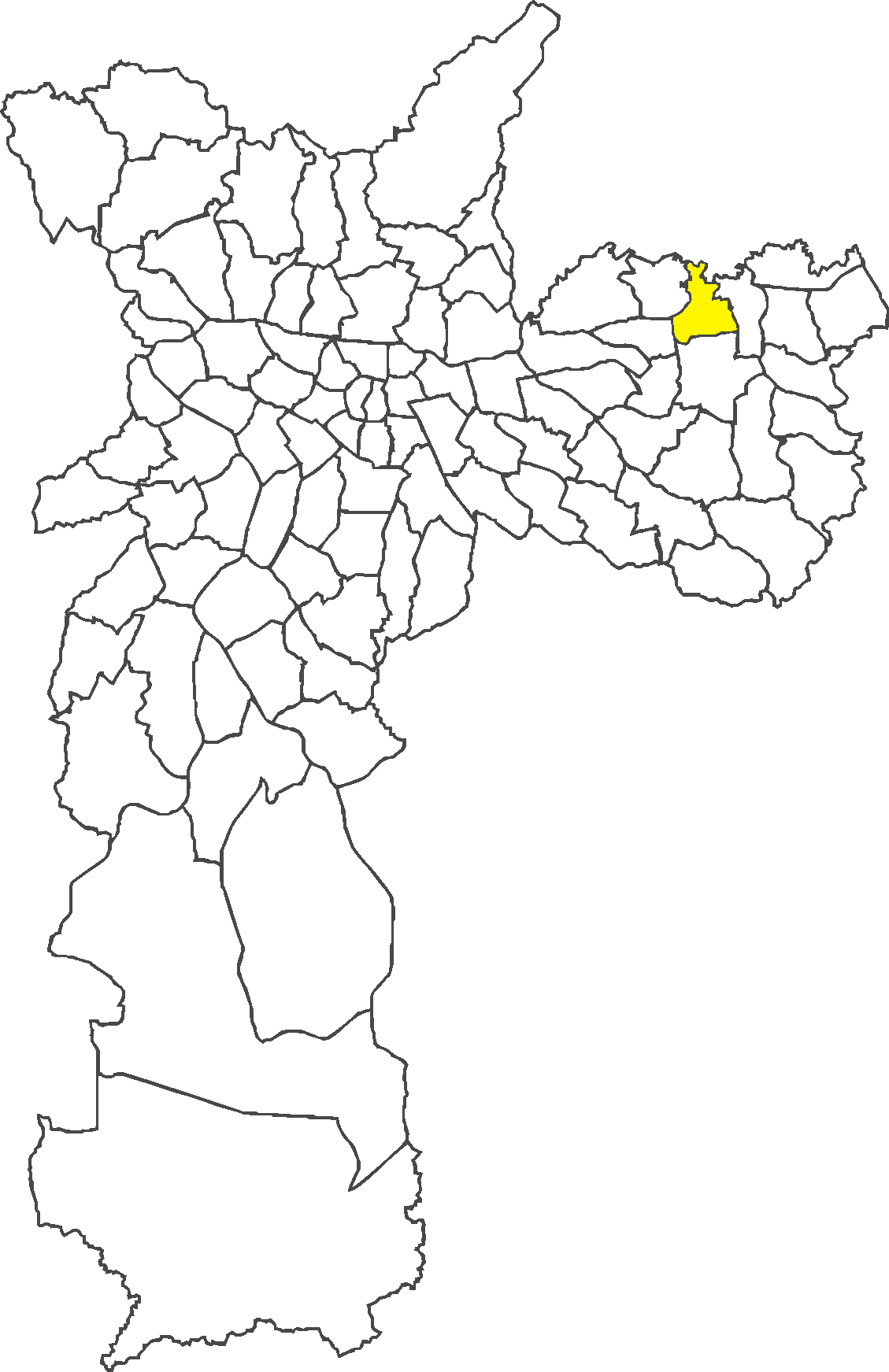
- Location in the city of São Paulo

- Location within São Paulo State Location within Brazil
- Country: Brazil
- State: São Paulo
- City: São Paulo

Government
  - Type: Subprefecture
  - Subprefect: Luiz Massao Kita

Area
  - Total: 77 km^{2} (30 sq mi)

Population (2007)
  - Total: 167.965
  - Density: 218.14/km^{2} (565.0/sq mi)
- HDI: 0.779 - medium
- Website: Subprefecture of São Miguel Paulista

Vila Jacuí is a district in the subprefecture of São Miguel Paulista in the city of São Paulo, Brazil.
