= Jardim Helena =

District of São Paulo, Brazil

Coordinates: 23.4802°S 46.4213°W

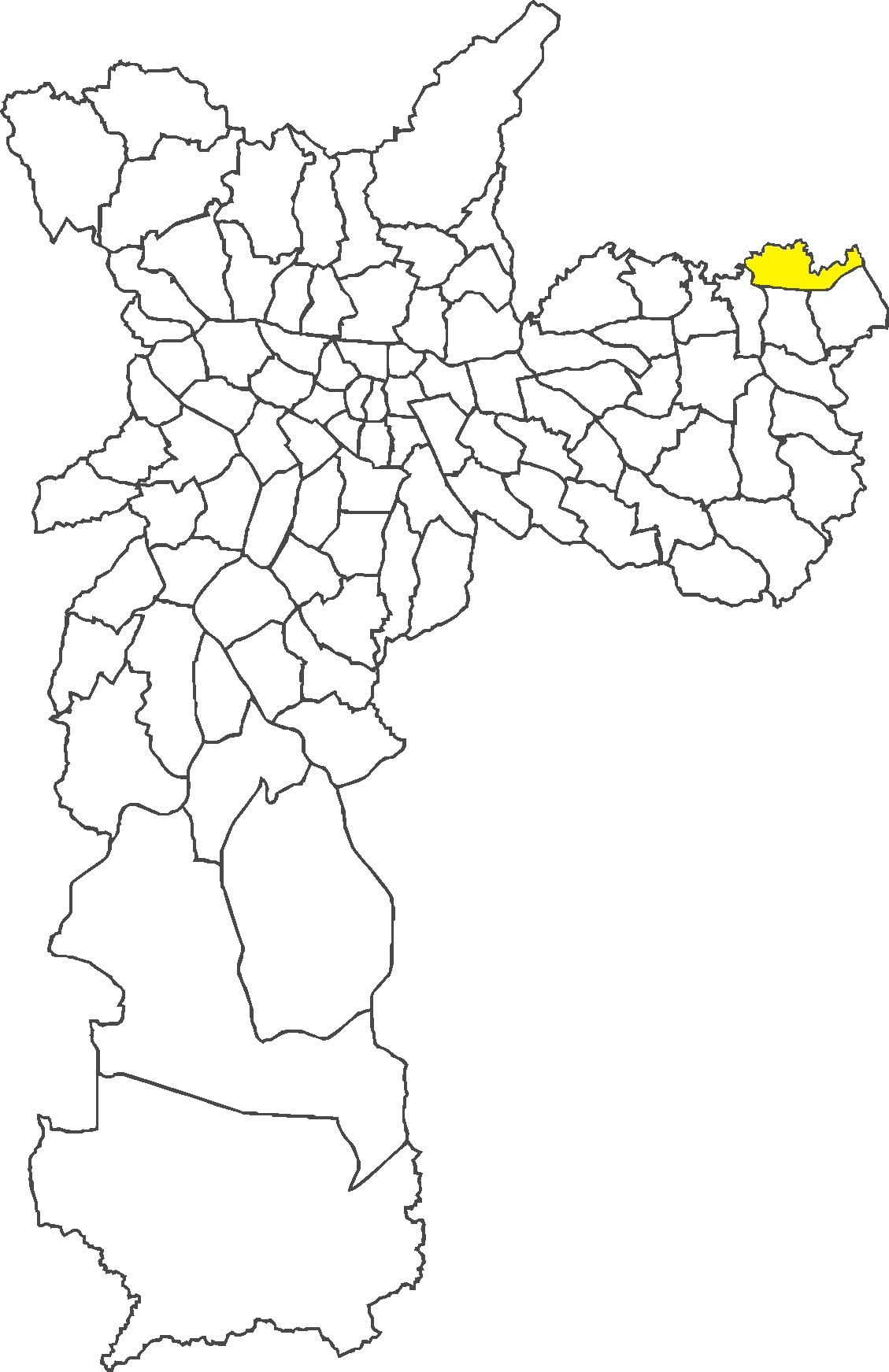
- District of the city of São Paulo
- Country: Brazil
- State: São Paulo
- Municipality: São Paulo
- Subprefecture: São Miguel Paulista

Area
  - Total: 7.50 km^{2} (2.90 sq mi)

Population (2007)
  - Total: 92,081
  - Density: 12,277/km^{2} (31,800/sq mi)
- Website: Subprefecture of São Miguel Paulista

Jardim Helena is one of 96 districts in the city of São Paulo, Brazil.
