= Wenceslau Braz, Paraná =

Wenceslau Braz
- Municipality
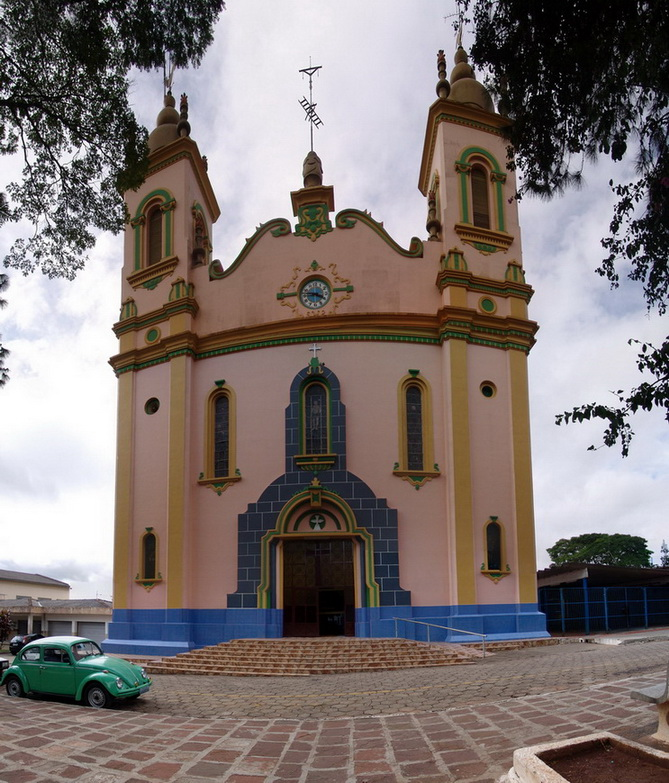

- Flag Coat of arms

- Location in Paraná

- Location in Brazil
- Coordinates: 23°52′26″S 49°48′10″W
- Country: Brazil
- Region: Southern
- State: Paraná
- Mesoregion: Norte Pioneiro Paranaense
- Microregion: Wenceslau Braz

Area
  - Total: 397.917 km^{2} (153.637 sq mi)
- Elevation: 841 m (2,759 ft)

Population (2020)
  - Total: 19,386
- Time zone: UTC−3 (BRT)
- CEP postal code: 84950-000
- Area code: 43
- Website: wenceslaubraz.pr.gov.br

Wenceslau Braz is a municipality in the state of Paraná in the Southern Region of Brazil.

== See also ==
- List of municipalities in Paraná
