= Ponte Rasa =

District of São Paulo, Brazil

Coordinates: 23.5077°S 46.4758°W

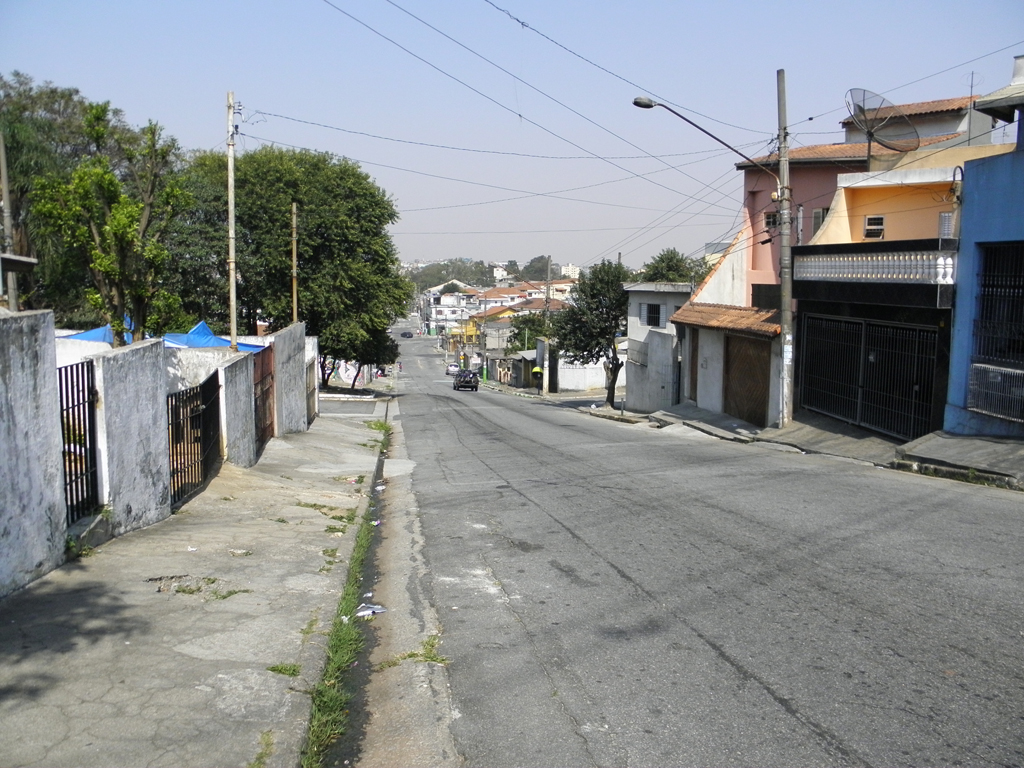

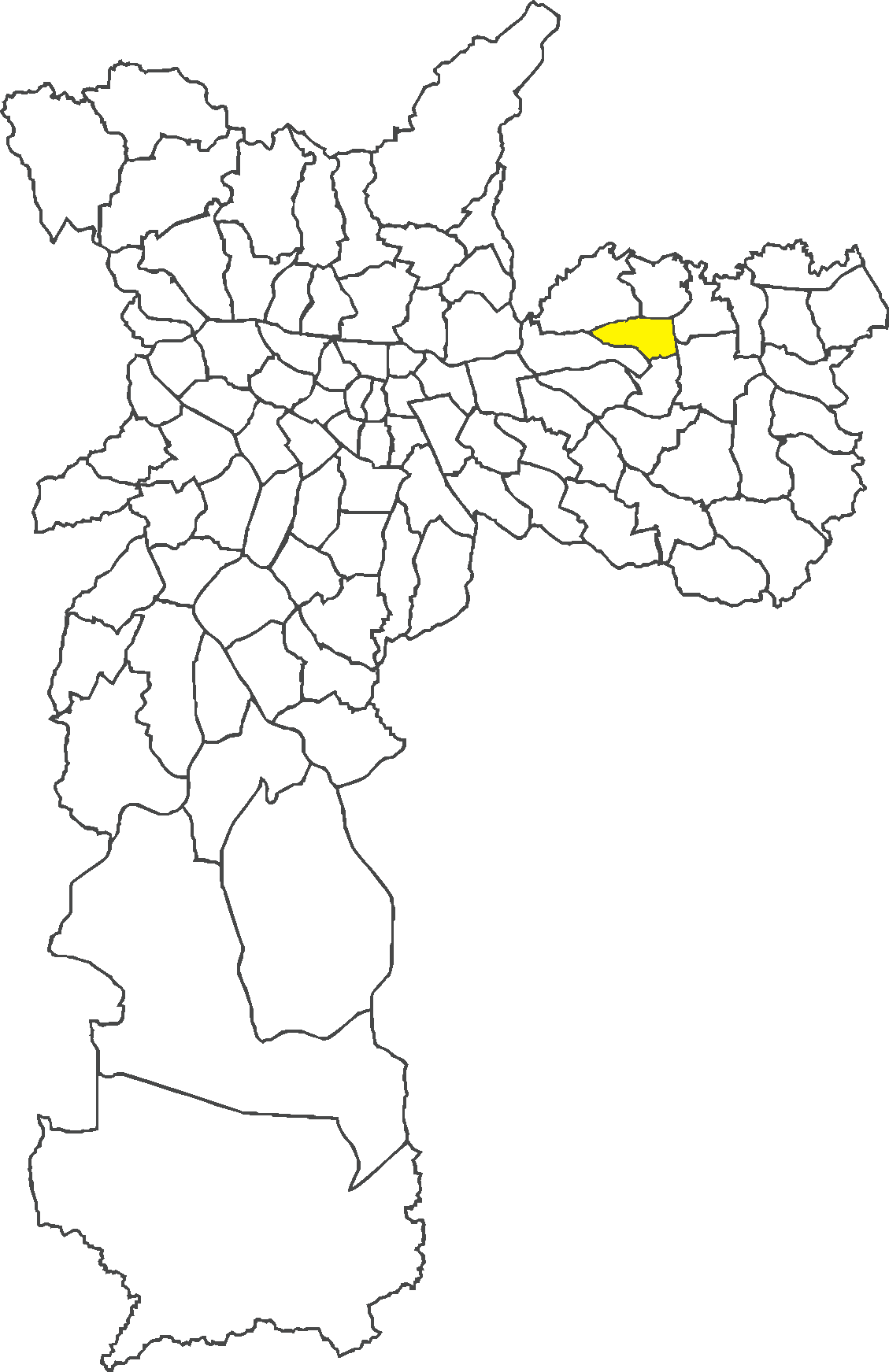
- District of the city of São Paulo
- Country: Brazil
- State: São Paulo
- Municipality: São Paulo
- Subprefecture: Ermelino Matarazzo

Area
  - Total: 6.40 km^{2} (2.47 sq mi)

Population (2007)
  - Total: 93,894
  - Density: 14,671/km^{2} (38,000/sq mi)
- Website: Subprefecture of Ermelino Matarazzo

Ponte Rasa is one of 96 districts in the city of São Paulo, Brazil.
