= Ermelino Matarazzo (district of São Paulo) =

District of São Paulo, Brazil

Coordinates: 23.4887°S 46.468°W

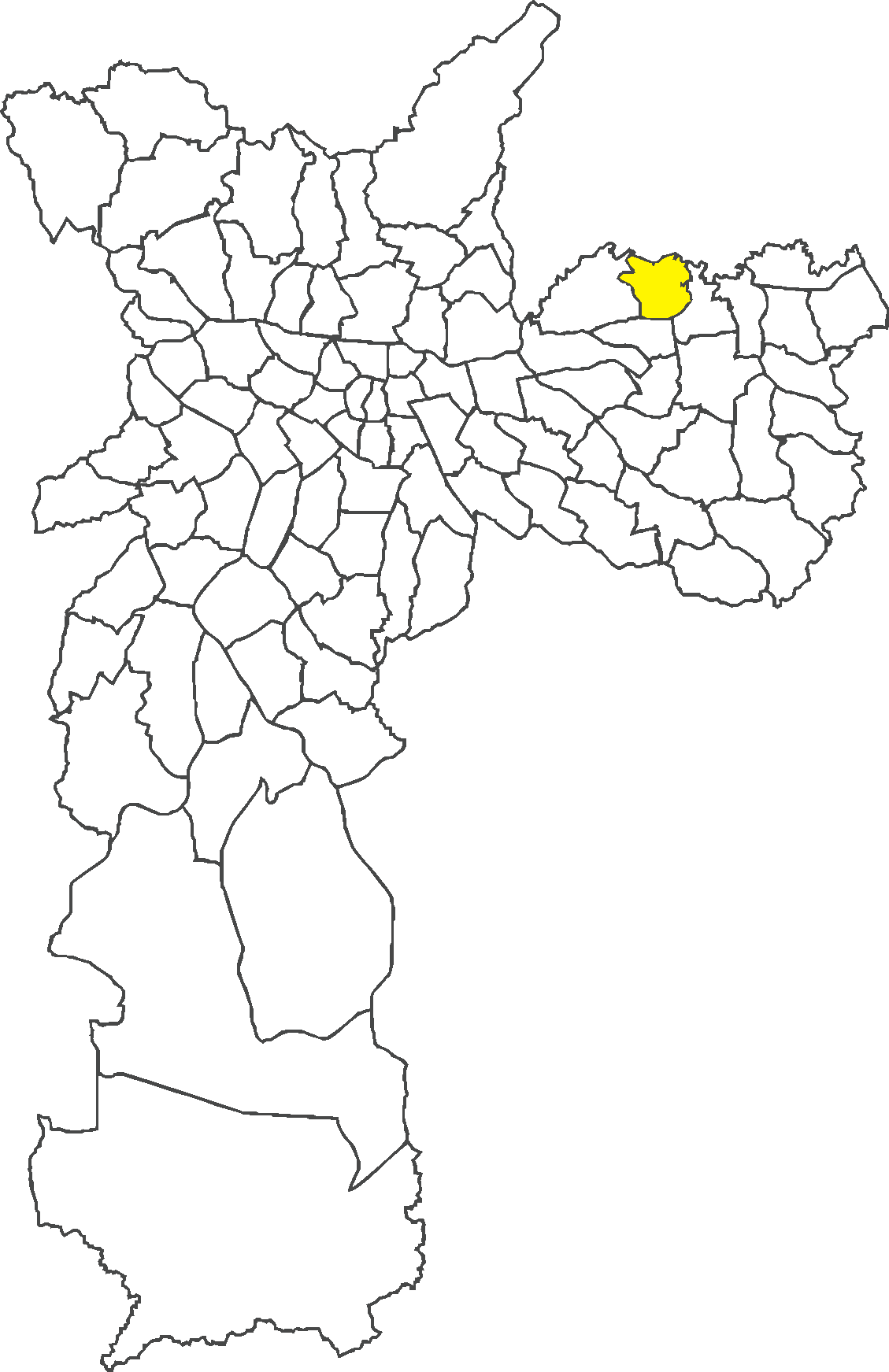
- District of the city of São Paulo
- Country: Brazil
- State: São Paulo
- Municipality: São Paulo
- Subprefecture: Ermelino Matarazzo

Area
  - Total: 8.70 km^{2} (3.36 sq mi)

Population (2007)
  - Total: 113,615
  - Density: 13,059/km^{2} (33,820/sq mi)
- Website: Subprefecture of Ermelino Matarazzo

Ermelino Matarazzo is one of 96 districts in the city of São Paulo, Brazil.
