= Armênia (São Paulo Metro) =

São Paulo Metro station

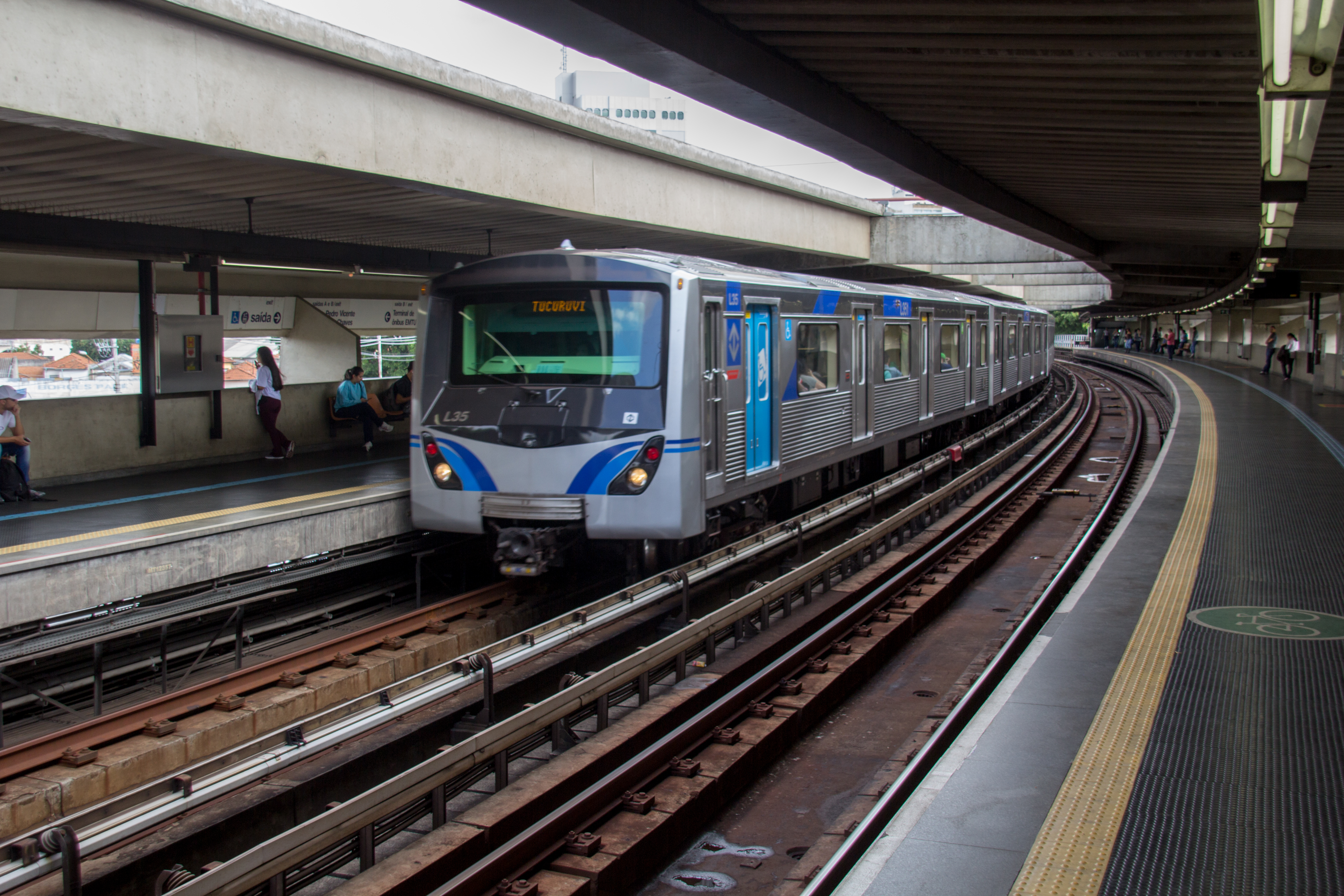

General information
- Location: Av. Cruzeiro do Sul, 1777, Santana; São Paulo; Brazil
- Coordinates: 23°31′31″S 46°37′45″W
- Owner: Government of the State of São Paulo
- Operator: Companhia do Metropolitano de São Paulo
- Platforms: Side platforms
- Connections: Armênia Bus Terminal

Construction
- Structure type: Elevated
- Accessible: y
- Architect: Marcelo Accioly Fragelli
- Architectural style: Brutalism

Other information
- Station code: PPQ

History
- Opened: September 26, 1975
- Former names: Ponte Pequena

Passengers
- 21,000/business day

Services
Preceding station	São Paulo Metro	Following station
Portuguesa-Tietê towards Tucuruvi	Line 1	Tiradentes towards Jabaquara
Location

Armênia, originally known as Ponte Pequena, is a metro station on São Paulo Metro Line 1-Blue, located in the district of Bom Retiro, in São Paulo.

== History ==
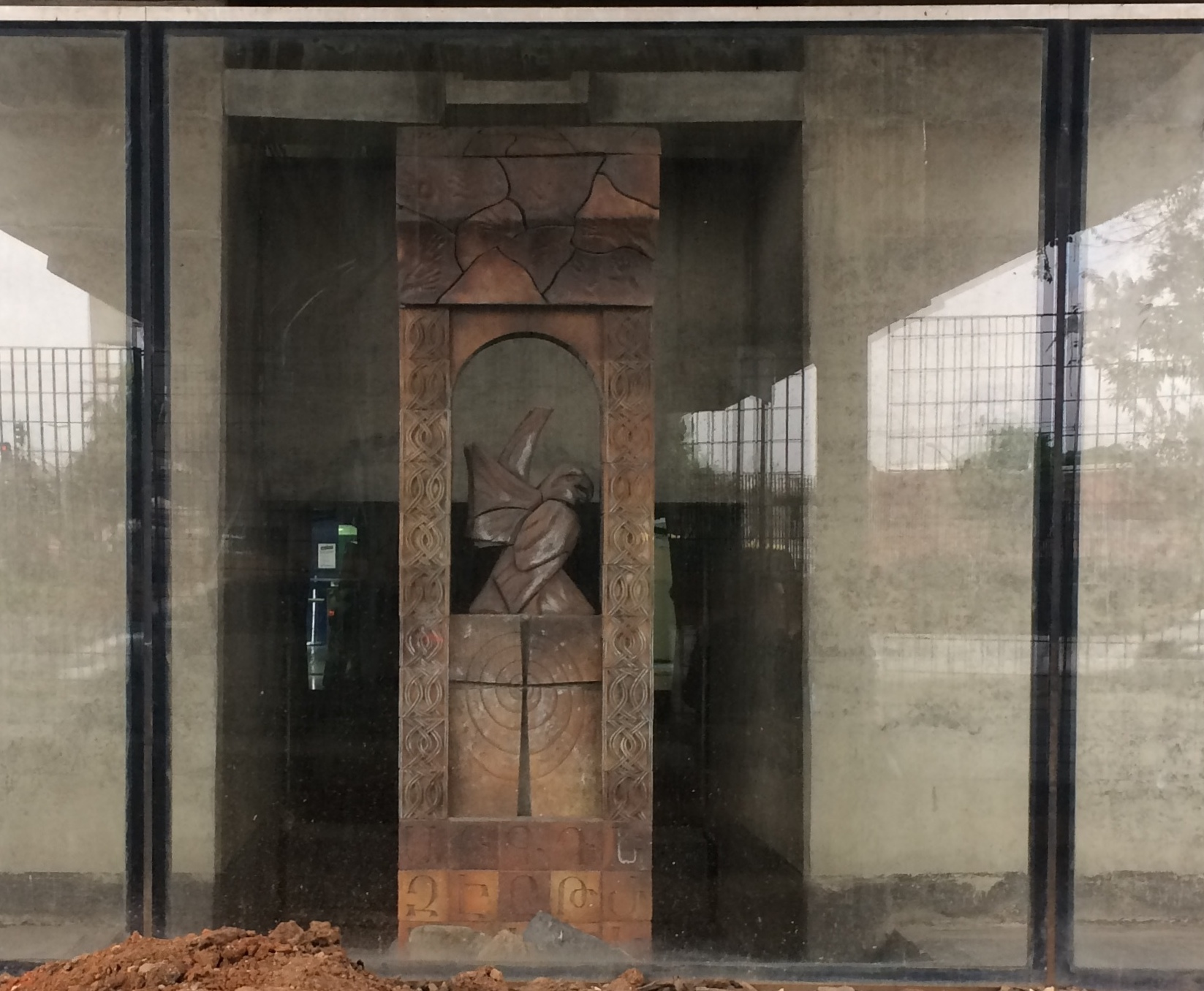
Armênia Memorial, from the São Paulo Metropolitan Company Collection, made by Josely Carvalho.

It was opened on 26 September 1975, named as Ponte Pequena, as a reference to the name of the location (the old bridge of Avenida Tiradentes over Tamanduateí River, which contrasted to the now demolished Ponte Grande, over Tietê River). On 12 November 1985, the station was renamed as a tribute for Armenian immigrants in São Paulo, who financially helped in the construction of the station.

It is the seventh station towards Jabaquara. It is located, officially, in Praça Armênia, in the district of Bom Retiro, center region of the capital, but has two access with elevators for people with disabilities by the crossing of Avenida Tiradentes with Avenida do Estado.

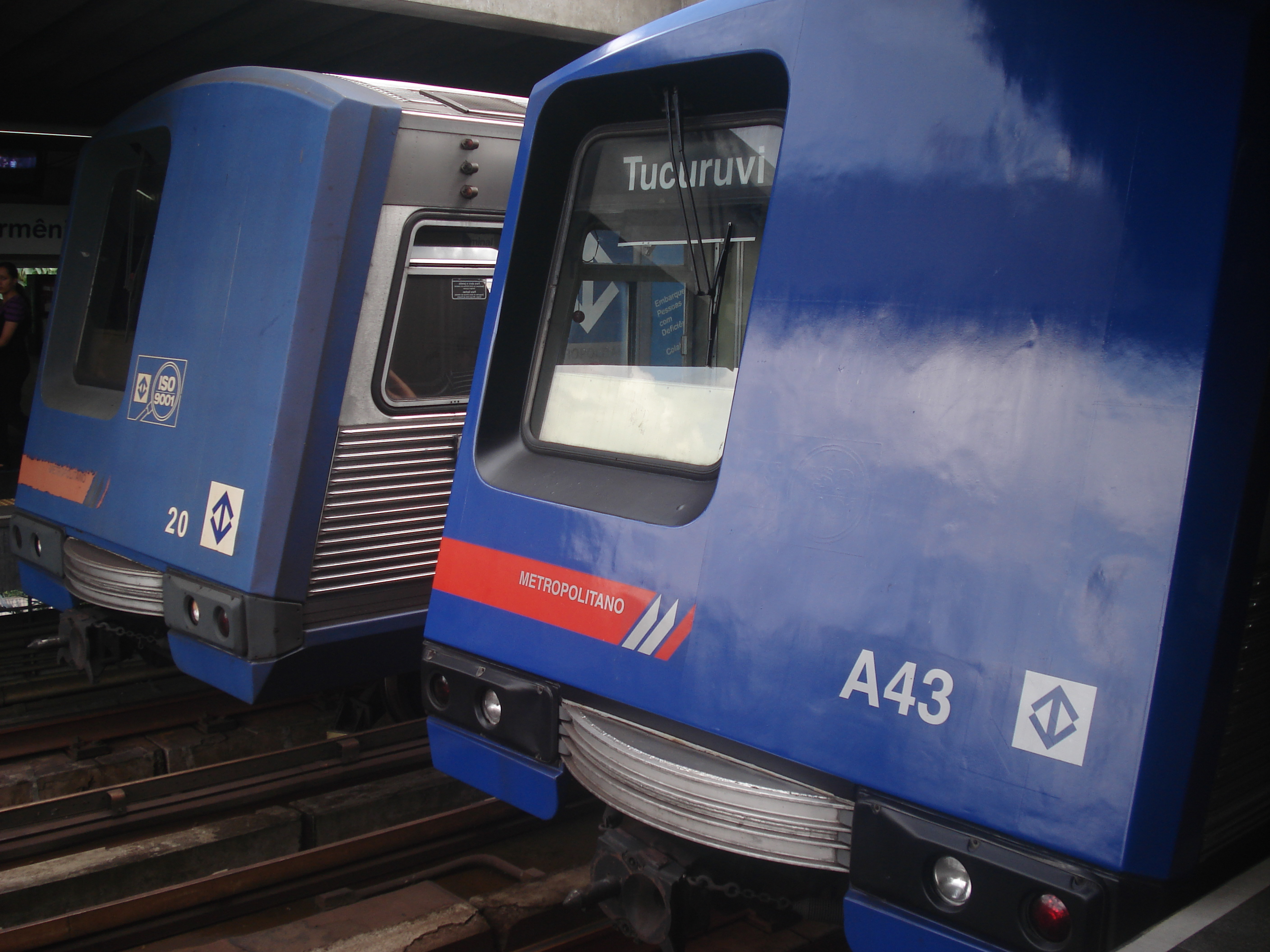
Trains stopped at the station.

It's an elevated station, in a curve, with structure in apparent concrete, prefabricated cover in concrete and two side platforms, which are suspended over Avenida do Estado and Tamanduateí River.

Along the station, an urban bus terminal was implanted, named North Armênia Metropolitan Terminal, operated by EMTU. The lines attend the municipalities of Guarulhos, Mogi das Cruzes, Barueri and Osasco. In the platforms, there is access for people with disabilities. The south terminal attends the municipalities of Guarulhos (Central Region and Suburban), Arujá, Santa Isabel and Itaquaquecetuba.
