= Tiradentes (São Paulo Metro) =

São Paulo Metro station

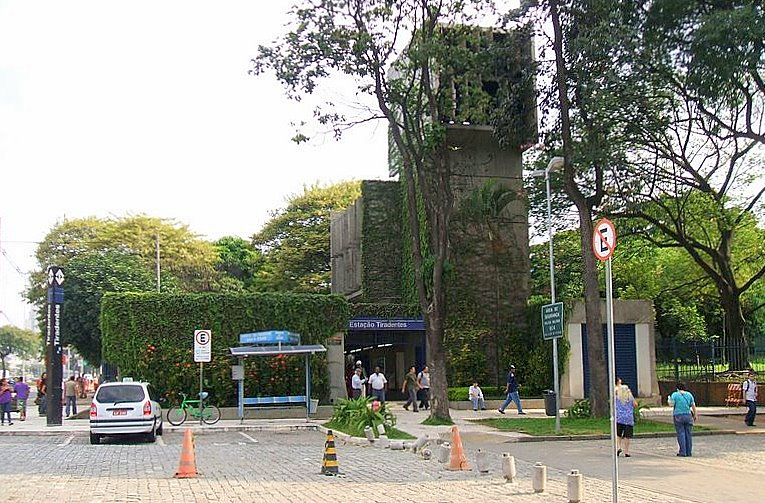

General information
- Location: Av. Tiradentes, 551, Bom Retiro; São Paulo; Brazil
- Coordinates: 23°31′51″S 46°37′55″W
- Owner: Government of the State of São Paulo
- Operator: Companhia do Metropolitano de São Paulo
- Platforms: Side platforms

Construction
- Structure type: Underground
- Accessible: Yes
- Architect: Flávio Marcondes

Other information
- Station code: TRD

History
- Opened: 26 September 1975

Passengers
- 16,000/business day

Services
Preceding station	São Paulo Metro	Following station
Armênia towards Tucuruvi	Line 1	Luz towards Jabaquara
Location

Tiradentes is a metro station on São Paulo Metro Line 1-Blue, located in the district of Bom Retiro, in São Paulo.

== Characteristics ==
It is an underground station, with structure in apparent concrete and island platform. It has a built area of 9,670 square metres (104,100 sq ft).

== Average station demand ==
The average entrance of the station is 19,000 passengers per day, according to São Paulo Metro data. It is the less crowded station in the central region and the third to receive fewer people per day in the line, behind Jardim São Paulo–Ayrton Senna and Carandiru stations.
