= Santana (São Paulo Metro) =

São Paulo Metro station

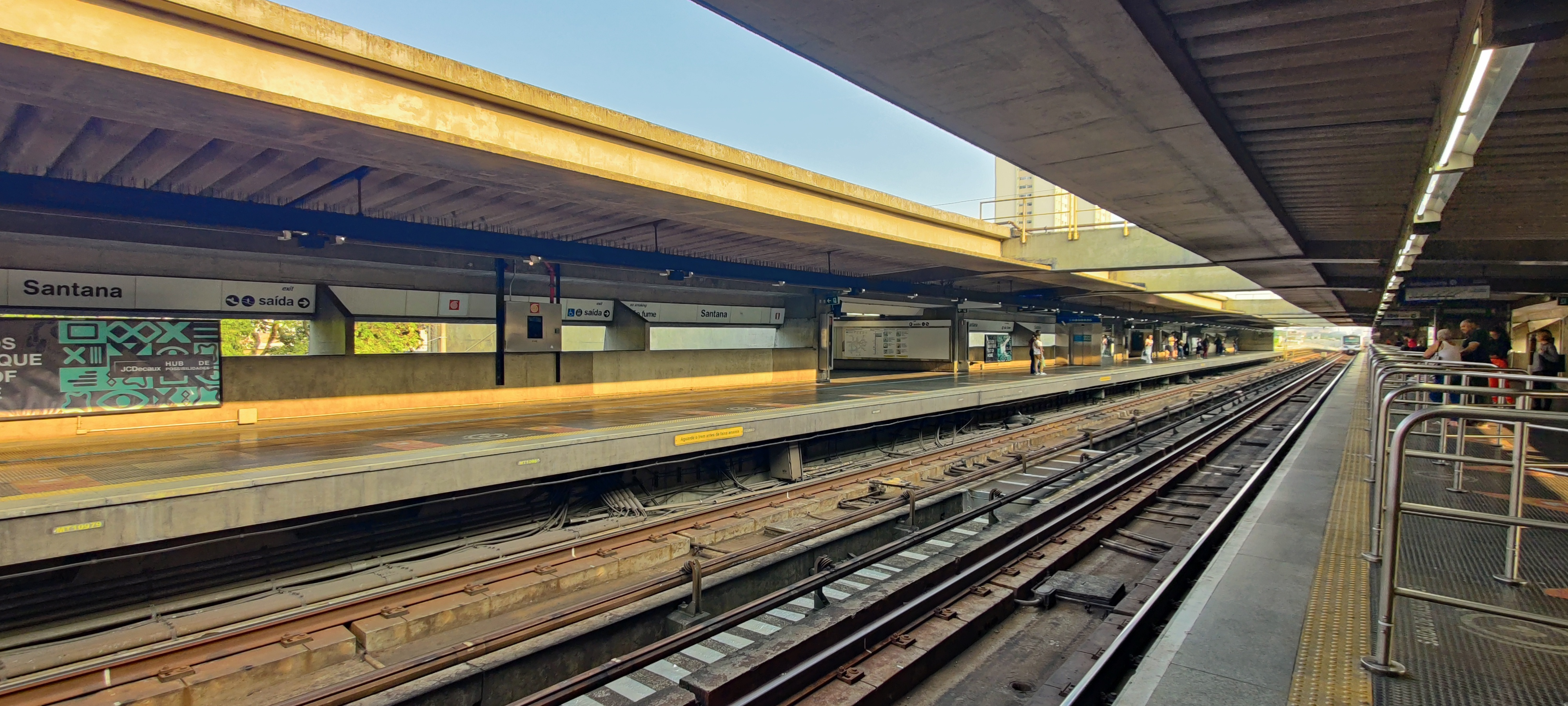
- Platform of the station

General information
- Location: Av. Cruzeiro do Sul, 3173, Santana; São Paulo; Brazil
- Coordinates: 23°30′09″S 46°37′29″W
- Owner: Government of the State of São Paulo
- Operator: Companhia do Metropolitano de São Paulo
- Platforms: Side platforms
- Connections: Santana Bus Terminal

Construction
- Structure type: Elevated
- Accessible: y
- Architect: Marcelo Accioly Fragelli

Other information
- Station code: SAN

History
- Opened: September 26, 1975

Passengers
- 49,000/business day

Services
Preceding station	São Paulo Metro	Following station
Jardim São Paulo-Ayrton Senna towards Tucuruvi	Line 1	Carandiru towards Jabaquara
Track layout
Location

Santana is a metro station on São Paulo Metro Line 1-Blue, located in the district of Santana, in São Paulo. It was opened on 26 September 1975. For more than 20 years, it was the terminus for the line in its north branch.

== Location ==
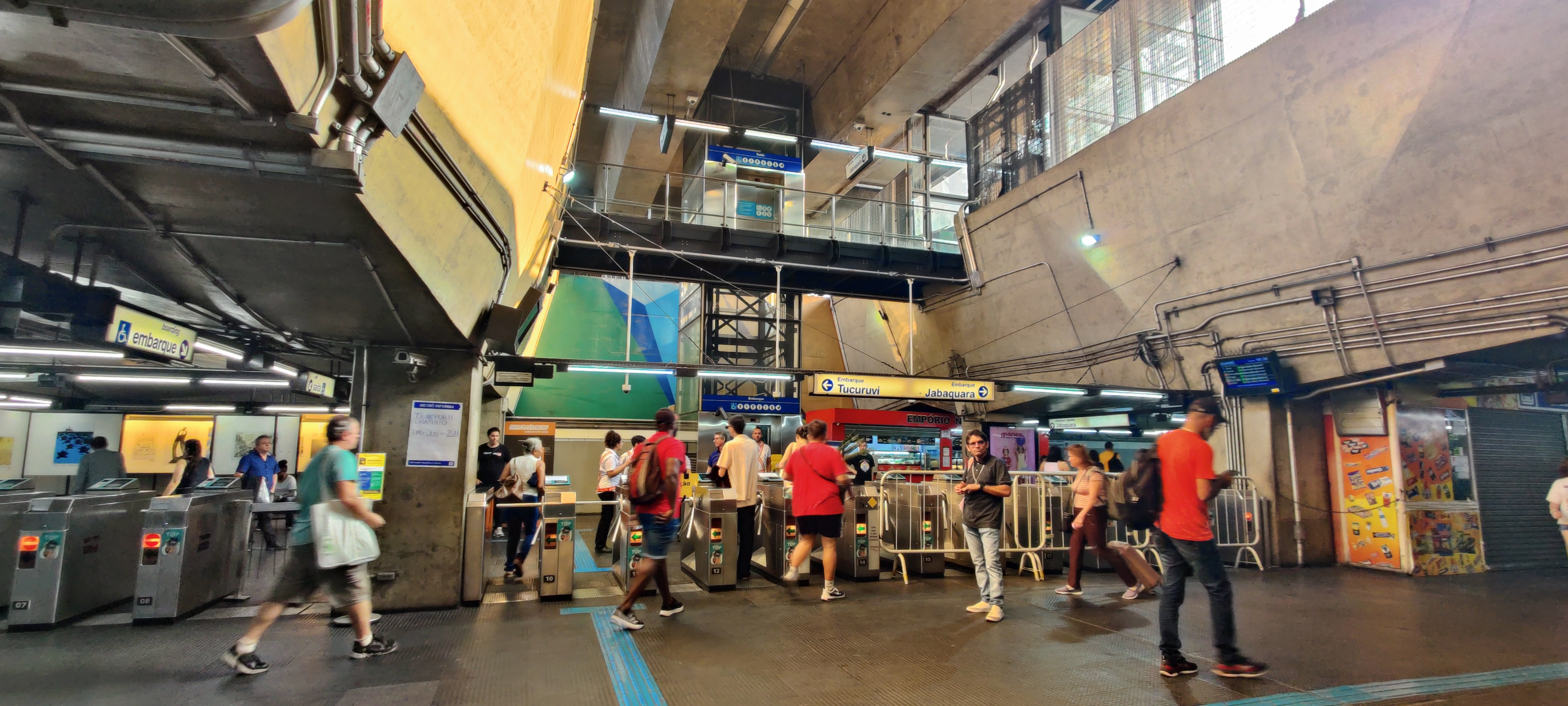
Mezzanine of the station

It is located in an area known as Centro de Santana, in Avenida Cruzeiro do Sul, 3173, in the district of Santana, North Side of São Paulo.

In 1964, Santana station of the Cantareira Tramway was demolished, originally built in 1895 and located in Rua Alfredo Pujol between Rua Voluntários da Pátria and Avenida Cruzeiro do Sul, exactly in the center of the corner, on the right side towards Cantareira, not so far from the current metro station.

== Characteristics ==
It is an elevated station made of apparent concrete, with prefabricated cover in concrete and side platforms. It has 2 levels, being one on the underground (with access to a bus terminal), gates and ticket offices, and another one for the platforms, with escalators and staircases serving as connection between the levels. It has 8,565 square metres (92,190 sq ft) of built area.

It has three exits, the first on the corner of Avenida Cruzeiro do Sul with Rua Leite de Morais, the second one next to EESG Padre Antônio Vieira, in the corner with Rua Dr. Gabriel Piza (these two to west of the line), and the third one inside Santana Bus Terminal, located east to the station. The station also has an elevator for access for people with disabilities.

The station has capacity for 30,000 passengers per hour during peak hours.

The station also has the most extensive escalators of the system, which goes from under the avenue until the elevated platforms. They both have 35 35 metres (115 ft) of length, with a gap of 20 metres (66 ft).
