= Vila Mariana =

Vila Mariana may refer to:

- Subprefecture of Vila Mariana, São Paulo
- Vila Mariana (district of São Paulo)
- Vila Mariana (São Paulo Metro)
