= Vila Mariana (São Paulo Metro) =

São Paulo Metro station

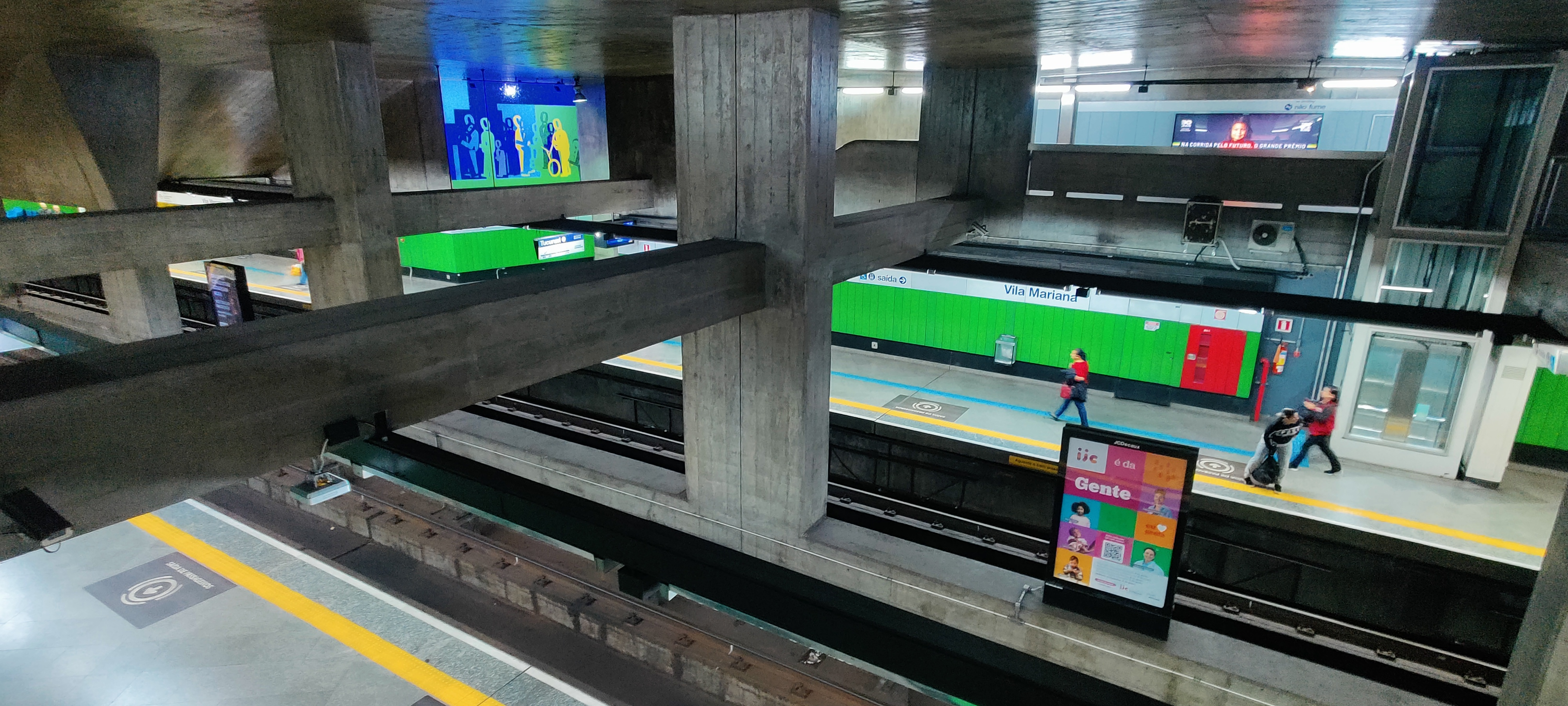
- Platforms of Vila Mariana metro station

General information
- Location: 255 Av. Profº. Noé Azevedo; São Paulo; Brazil
- Coordinates: 23°35′22″S 46°38′05″W
- Owner: Government of the State of São Paulo
- Operator: Companhia do Metropolitano de São Paulo
- Platforms: Side platforms
- Connections: Vila Mariana Bus Terminal

Construction
- Structure type: Underground
- Accessible: y

Other information
- Station code: VMN

History
- Opened: September 14, 1974

Passengers
- 21,000/business day

Services
Preceding station	São Paulo Metro	Following station
Ana Rosa towards Tucuruvi	Line 1	Santa Cruz towards Jabaquara
Track layout
Location

Vila Mariana is a station on Line 1 (Blue) of the São Paulo Metro.

== SPTrans ==
Passengers may access the following SPTrans bus routes from the station:

274P/10	Penha
4706/10	Jardim Maria Estela II
4708/10	Jardim Climax
4709/10	Jardim São Savério
695T/10	Terminal Capelinha
695T/51	Terminal Capelinha
695Y/10	Terminal Parelheiros
875H/10	Terminal Lapa
917H/10	Terminal Pirituba
