= Portuguesa-Tietê (São Paulo Metro) =

São Paulo Metro station

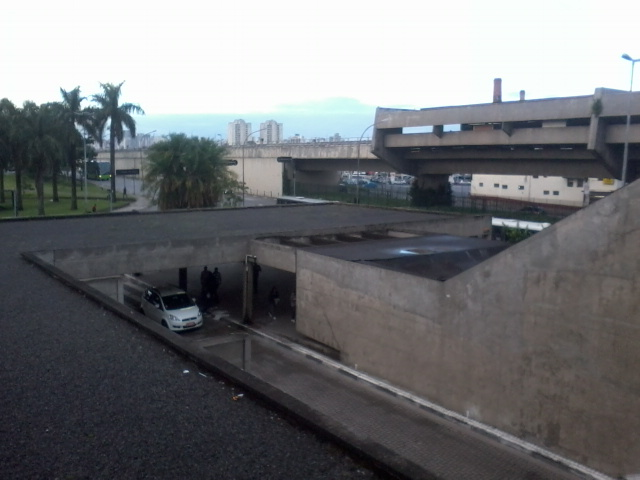
- Exterior of the station, as viewed by the Tietê Road Terminal

General information
- Location: São Paulo; Brazil
- Coordinates: 23°30′58″S 46°37′31″W
- Owner: Government of the State of São Paulo
- Operator: Companhia do Metropolitano de São Paulo
- Platforms: Side platforms
- Connections: Tietê Road Terminal

Construction
- Structure type: Elevated
- Accessible: y

Other information
- Station code: TTE

History
- Opened: September 26, 1975
- Former names: Cruzeiro do Sul; Tietê

Passengers
- 44,000/business day

Services
Preceding station	São Paulo Metro	Following station
Carandiru towards Tucuruvi	Line 1	Armênia towards Jabaquara
Track layout
Location

Portuguesa-Tietê is a metro station on São Paulo Metro Line 1-Blue, located in the district of Santana, in São Paulo. It was opened on September 26, 1975. Named as Tietê, it was renamed on June 10, 2006, as a tribute to Associação Portuguesa de Desportos, soccer club located in its surroundings.

== Location ==
The station is located west of Tietê Road Terminal, which is connected since its opening in 1982. It is also located 200 metres (660 ft) north from Tietê River.

== Characteristics ==
It is an elevated station with structure in apparent concrete and two side platforms. Besides the access, it also has two gates in each of the platforms, in a way that the passenger who leaves a train in the station can't take another one in the opposite way without paying another fee.

It has four exits, being one of them inside the area of the Road Terminal, one for the urban bus terminal along with the road terminal, one on the east sidewalk and another one on the west sidewalk of Avenida Cruzeiro do Sul.
