= Carandiru (São Paulo Metro) =

São Paulo Metro station

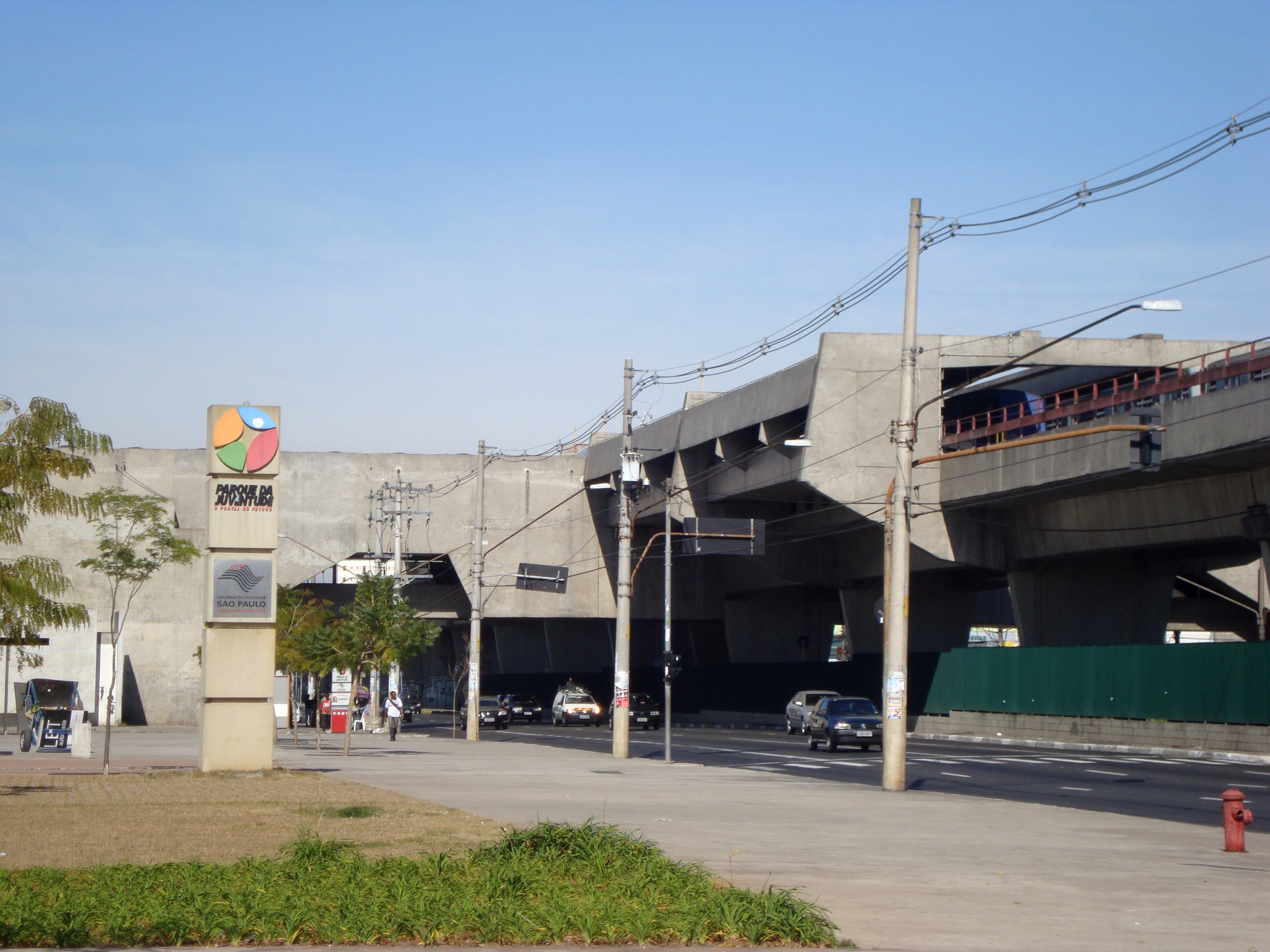

General information
- Location: Av. Cruzeiro do Sul, 2487, Santana; São Paulo; Brazil
- Coordinates: 23°30′35″S 46°37′30″W
- Owner: Government of the State of São Paulo
- Operator: Companhia do Metropolitano de São Paulo
- Platforms: Side platforms

Construction
- Structure type: Elevated
- Accessible: y

Other information
- Station code: CDU

History
- Opened: September 26, 1975

Passengers
- 11,000/business day

Services
Preceding station	São Paulo Metro	Following station
Santana towards Tucuruvi	Line 1	Portuguesa-Tietê towards Jabaquara
Location

Carandiru is a metro station on São Paulo Metro Line 1-Blue, located in the district of Santana, in São Paulo. It was opened on 26 September 1975.

== Location ==
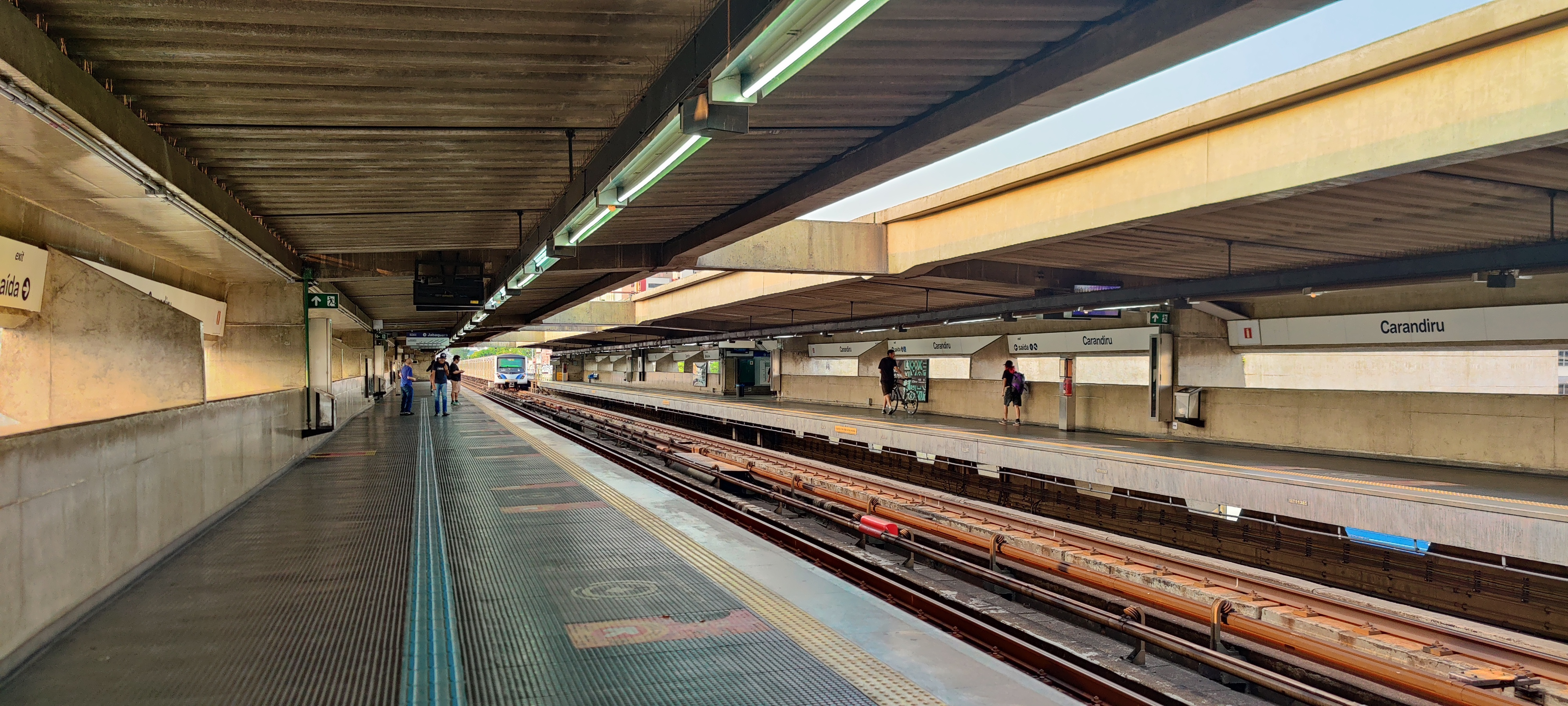
Platforms of Carandiru station

Located in Avenida Cruzeiro do Sul, 2487, in the district of Santana, North Side of São Paulo. It is next to the location of the old Carandiru Penitentiary, stage of many crises of the penitentiary system during more than 20 years, deactivated and imploded in 2002 to give place to Youth Park (Parque da Juventude).

== Characteristics ==
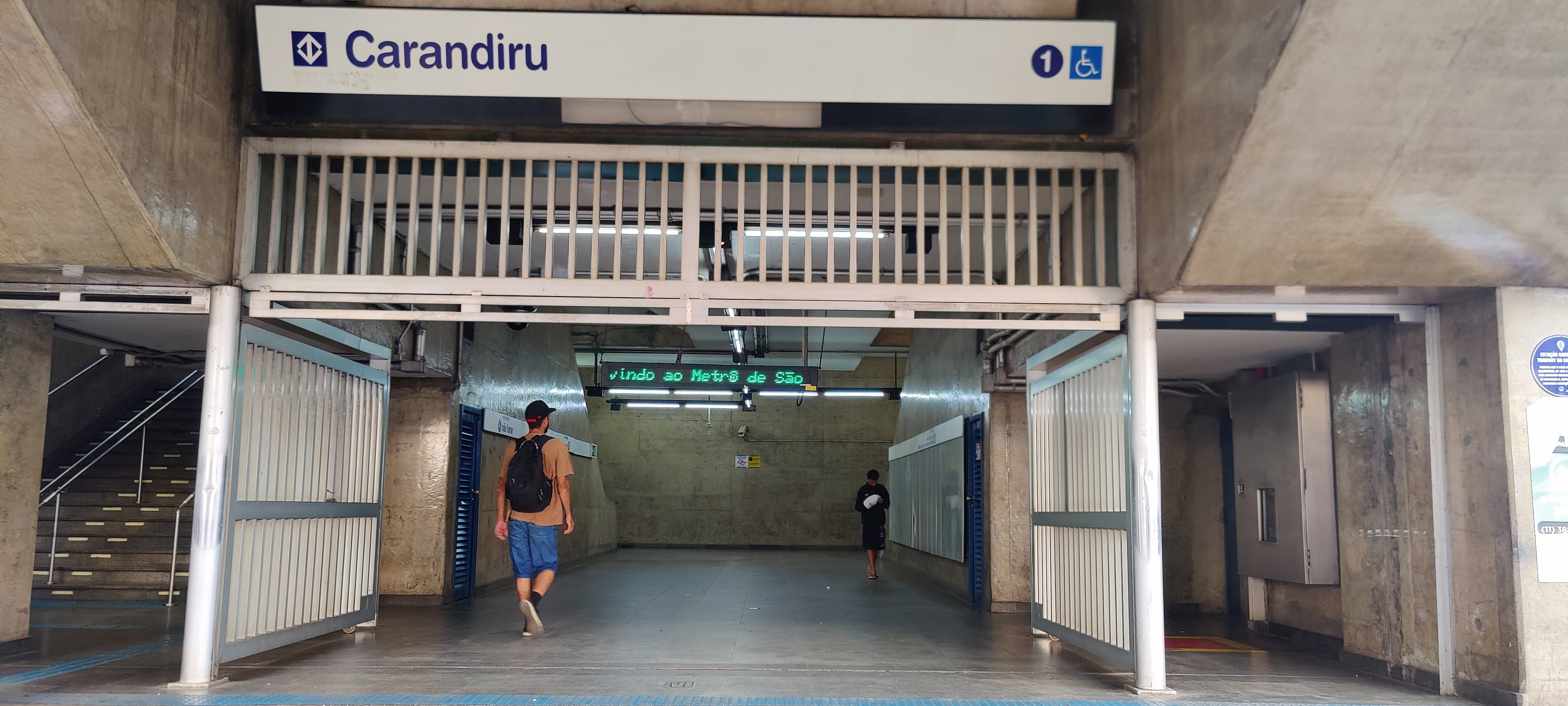
Entry to Carandiru station

It is an elevated station with structure in apparent concrete, prefabricated cover in concrete, and two side platforms. It also has, besides the access, two gates on each side of the platforms, in a way that the passenger who leaves the train in a platform cannot take the train on the opposite side without paying another fee.

It has 6,880 square metres (74,100 sq ft) of built area and capacity for 20,000 passengers per hour during peak hours.
