= Line 1 (São Paulo Metro) =

São Paulo Metro Line 1 (Blue)

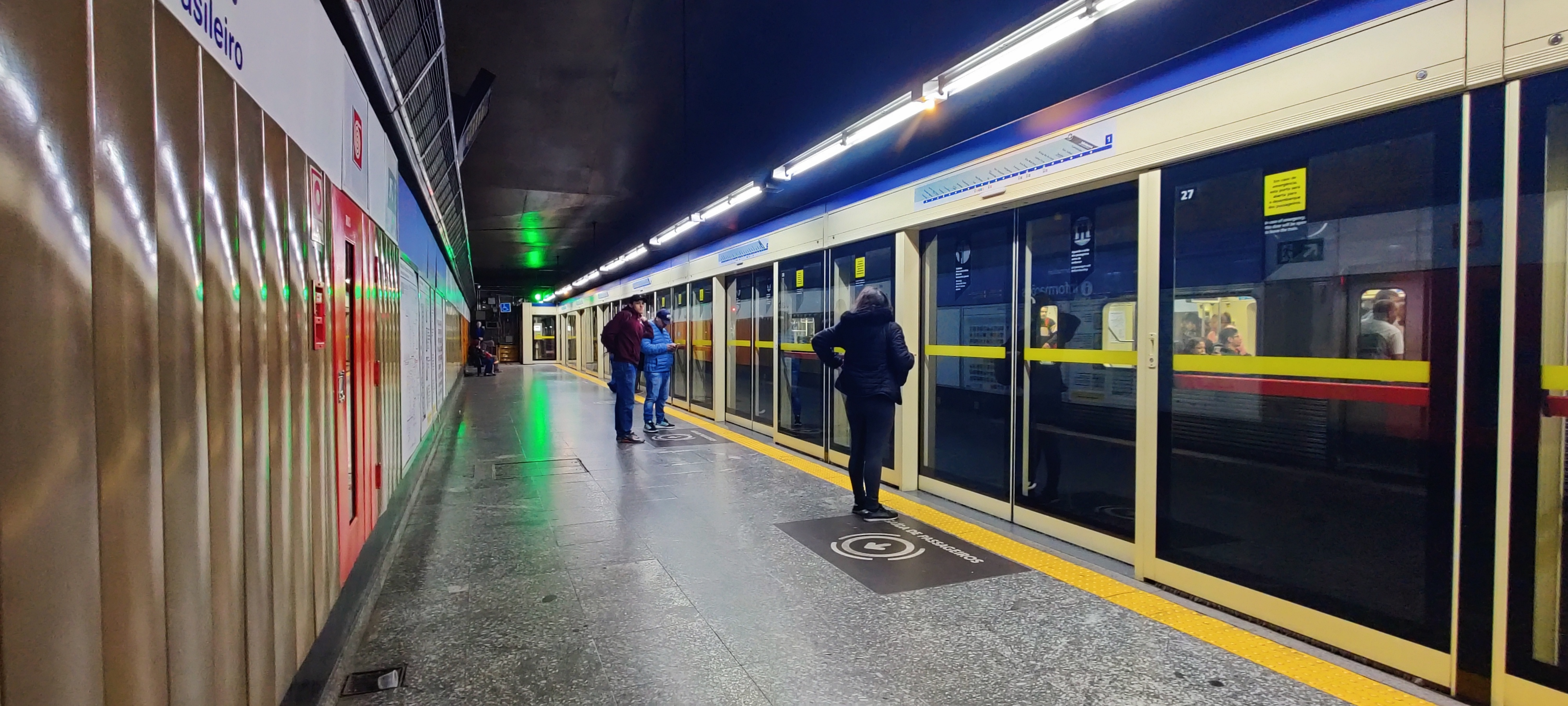
- Jabaquara station

Overview
- Status: Operational
- Owner: Government of the State of São Paulo
- Locale: São Paulo, Brazil
- Termini: Tucuruvi; Jabaquara–Comitê Paralímpico Brasileiro
- Connecting lines: Current: Future: Planned: 16 19 20
- Stations: 23

Service
- Type: Rapid transit
- System: São Paulo Metro
- Operator(s): CMSP
- Depot(s): Jabaquara rail yard Tucuruvi train park
- Rolling stock: 66 Alstom E stock (11 trains); 120 Bombardier/Tejofran/Temoinsa J stock (20 trains); 132 Alstom/IESA L stock (22 trains)
- Daily ridership: 710,000/business day

History
- Commenced: 1968
- Opened: September 14, 1974; 51 years ago
- Last extension: April 29, 1998

Technical
- Line length: 20.2 km (12.6 mi)
- Track gauge: 1,600 mm (5 ft 3 in)
- Electrification: 750 V DC third rail
- Operating speed: 87 km/h (54 mph)
- Signalling: Alstom Urbalis CBTC

Line 1 (Blue) (Portuguese: Linha 1–Azul) is one of the six lines that make up the São Paulo Metro and one of the thirteen lines that make up the Metropolitan Rail Transportation Network. It was the first line built for the São Paulo Metro and also the first metro line built in Brazil. It links Tucuruvi Station to Jabaquara Station. Construction began in the late 1960s and was completed in the early 1970s.

== History ==
Originally called North-South Line, line 1 began construction on December 14, 1968. Commercial operation began September 14, 1974, with trains running in the first seven kilometers between Jabaquara and Vila Mariana stations. On this first stretch, the daily service lasted from 10 am to 3 pm.

The choice of this route was motivated by the nonexistence of alternatives for collective rail transport for the residents of Santana and Jabaquara, and also to relieve the already complicated traffic in the city's Center. The Consortium that won the bid for the construction of the line was HMD, an association of two German companies, Hochtief and Deconsult, and the Brazilian Montreal. This consortium applied the newest technologies available at the time, such as stainless steel cars, automatic train control and signaling system, third biometallic track, electric car traction and potent electronics, making the São Paulo Metro one of the fastest and most modern in the world.

In 1975 it was expanded, first to Liberdade, then to Santana.

In 1978 the Sé station was opened.

In 1998 the line expanded to Tucuruvi, because Santana station didn't settle the number from uses.

On July 4, 2022 the line began operating with the modern CBTC system for automatic train control, replacing the original ATC system. Platform screen doors also began operating on this line.

=== Moema branch ===
When the subway was projected in 1968, it had a planning to include, besides the North-South Line (current Line 1-Blue), other two branches: Paulista (current Line 2-Green) and Moema.

Moema Branch would start at Paraíso station and follow underneath Avenida 23 de Maio, until Moema neighbourhood. The project was cancelled; however, about 200 metres (660 ft) of the branch were constructed and its initial stretch can still be noticed at Paraíso station.

On the upper platform towards Tucuruvi, heading towards the beginning of the platform, there are two granite tracks, similar to the ones at other stations platforms. Between these tracks, there's the Metro standard rubber floor. This floor is, actually, a siding, which was installed above the branch tracks. However, the line doesn't have a third track, not allowing the train park. On the beginning of the platform, a wall separates the rest of the branch. Inside this wall, there are two other tracks of the branch, which connects with Line 1 right after Paraíso station, towards Tucuruvi. It is currently used for the parking of Metro maintenance machines.

== Stations ==
Code	Station	Platforms	Position	Connections	District
TUC	Tucuruvi	Side platforms	Partially underground	Tucuruvi Bus Terminal; Guarulhos–São Paulo Metropolitan Corridor	Tucuruvi
PIG	Parada Inglesa	Side platforms	Elevated	Parada Inglesa Bus Terminal	Tucuruvi
JPA	Jardim São Paulo–Ayrton Senna	Island platform	Underground	-	Santana
SAN	Santana	Side platforms	Elevated	Santana Bus Terminal	Santana
CDU	Carandiru	Side platforms	Elevated	-	Santana
TTE	Portuguesa-Tietê	Side platforms	Elevated	Tietê Road Terminal	Santana
PPQ	Armênia	Side platforms	Elevated	Armênia Bus Terminal	Bom Retiro
TRD	Tiradentes	Island platform	Underground	-	Bom Retiro
LUZ	Luz	Island and side platforms	Underground	Touristic Express	Bom Retiro
BTO	São Bento	Split platforms	Underground	19 (Planned)	Sé
PSE	Sé	Island and side platforms	Underground	Line 3 (São Paulo Metro)	Sé
LIB	Japão-Liberdade	Side platforms	Underground	-	Sé
JQM	São Joaquim	Side platforms	Underground	(Future)	Liberdade
VGO	Vergueiro	Side platforms	Underground	-	Liberdade
PSO	Paraíso	Split platforms	Underground	Line 2 (São Paulo Metro)	Vila Mariana
ANR	Ana Rosa	Island platform	Underground	16 (Planned); Ana Rosa Bus Terminal	Vila Mariana
VMN	Vila Mariana	Side platforms	Underground	Vila Mariana Bus Terminal	Vila Mariana
SCZ	Santa Cruz	Side platforms	Underground	José Diniz–Ibirapuera–Santa Cruz Bus Corridor	Vila Mariana
ARV	Praça da Árvore	Side platforms	Underground	-	Saúde
SAU	Saúde	Side platforms	Underground	20 (Planned)	Saúde
JUD	São Judas	Side platforms	Underground	-	Saúde
CON	Conceição	Side platforms	Underground	Conceição Bus Terminal	Jabaquara
JAB	Jabaquara-Comitê Paralímpico Brasileiro	Side platforms	Underground	(Planned); Jabaquara Metropolitan Terminal; São Mateus–Jabaquara Metropolitan Corridor; São Paulo Zoo shuttle bus service Jabaquara Road Terminal	Jabaquara

== Gallery ==
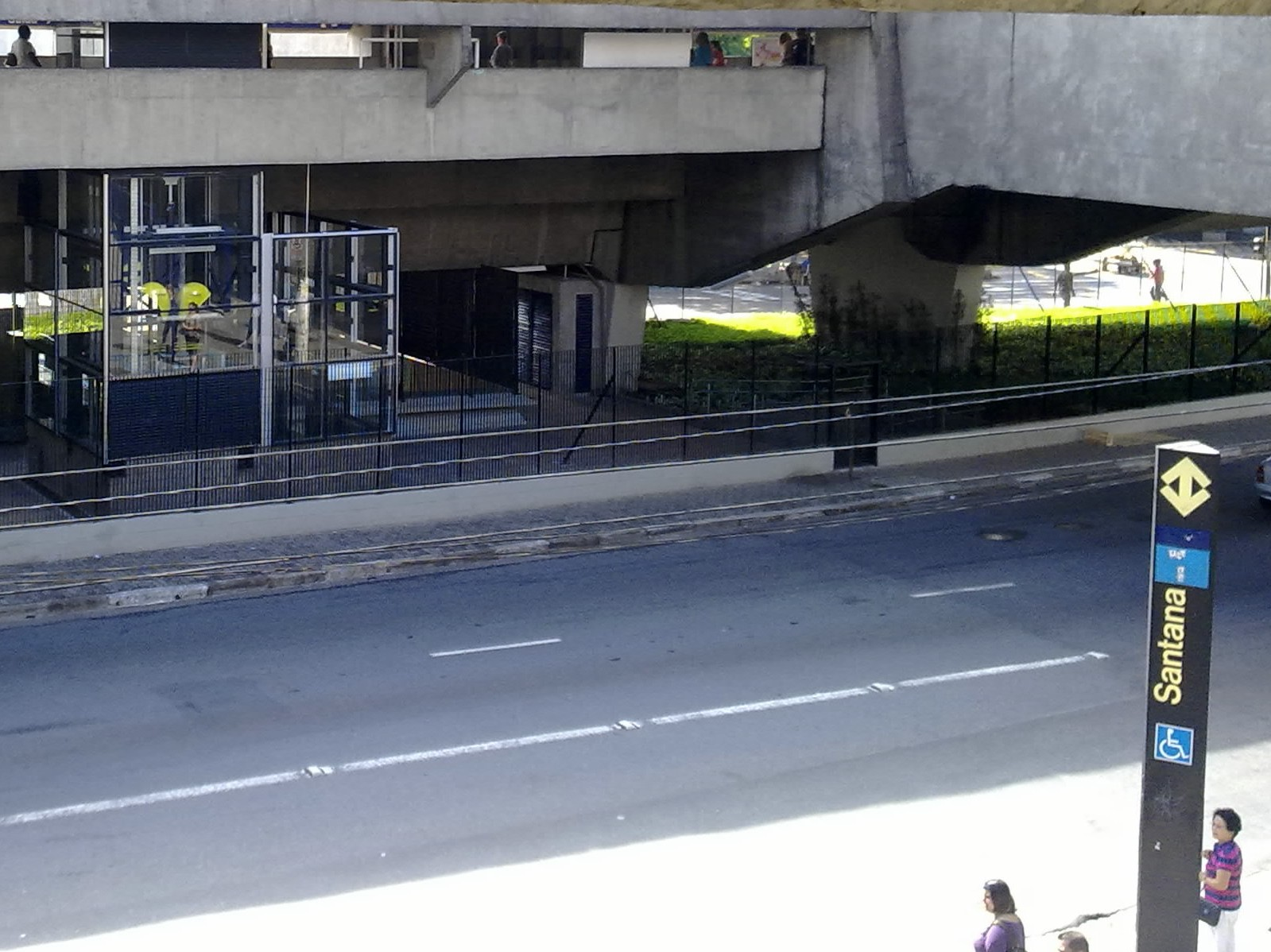
Santana Station

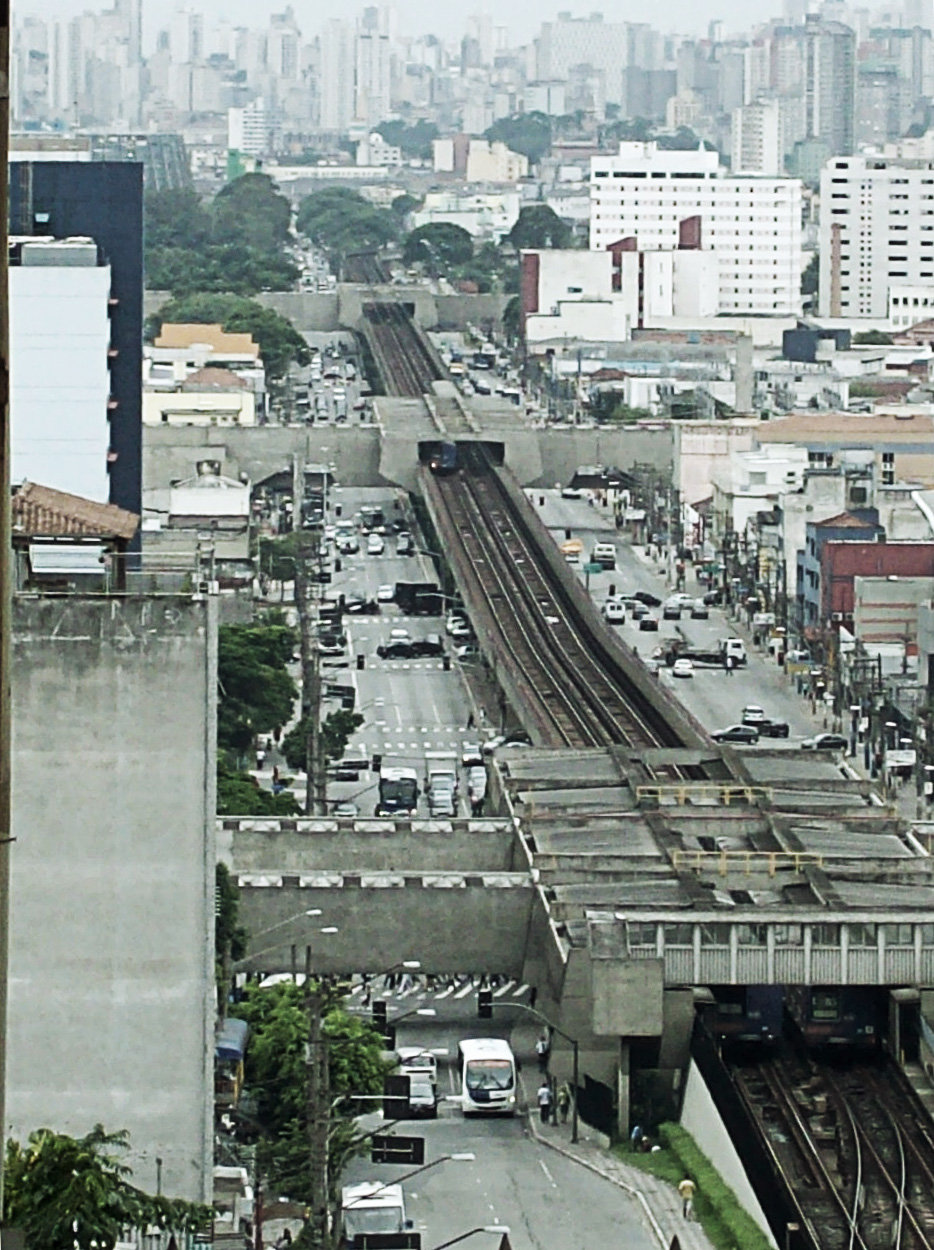
North Zone stations (Santana, Carandiru e Portuguesa-Tietê)

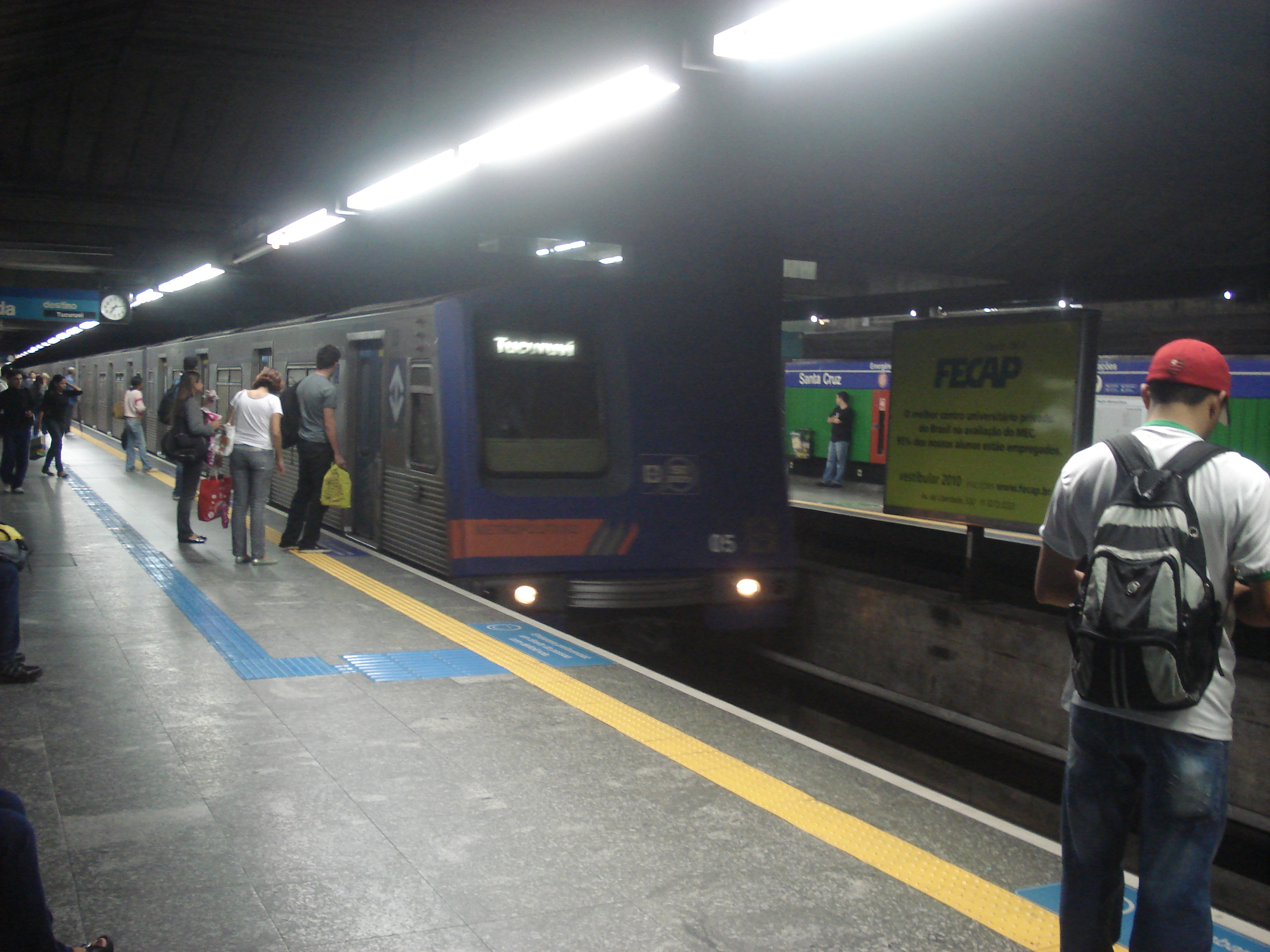
Budd-Mafersa train stopping at Santa Cruz Station

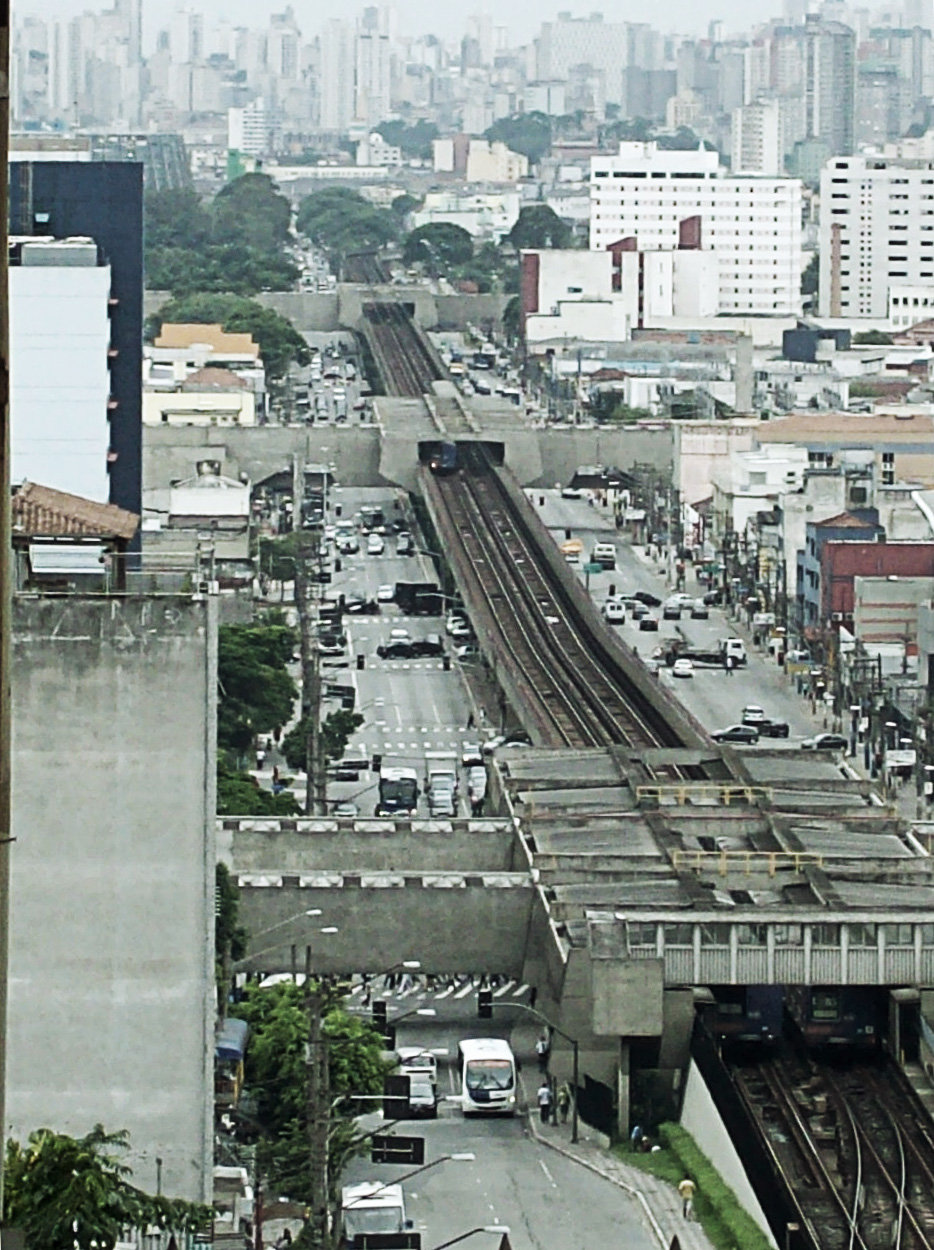
Elevated line seen in the district of Santana.

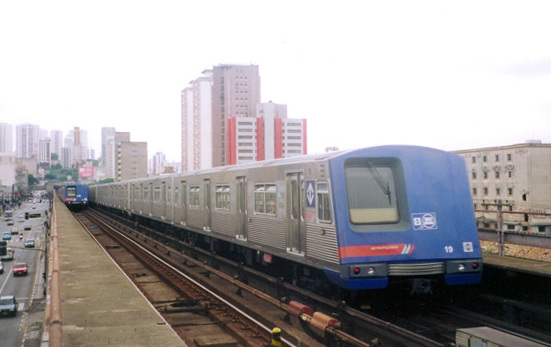
Railway line passing through Santana.

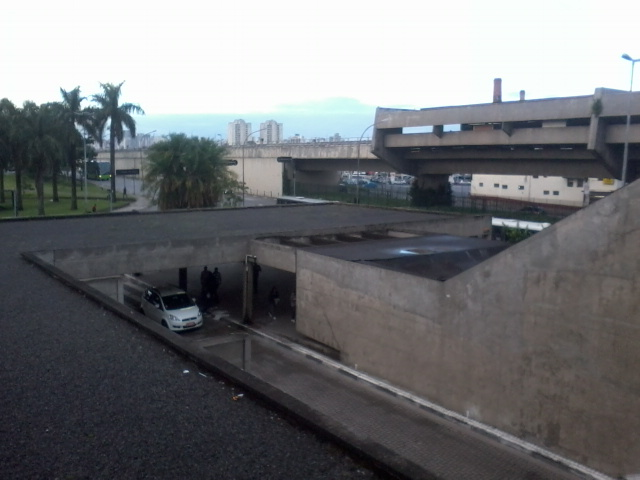
Portuguesa-Tietê Station
