= Teatro Alfredo Mesquita =

Theatre in São Paulo, Brazil

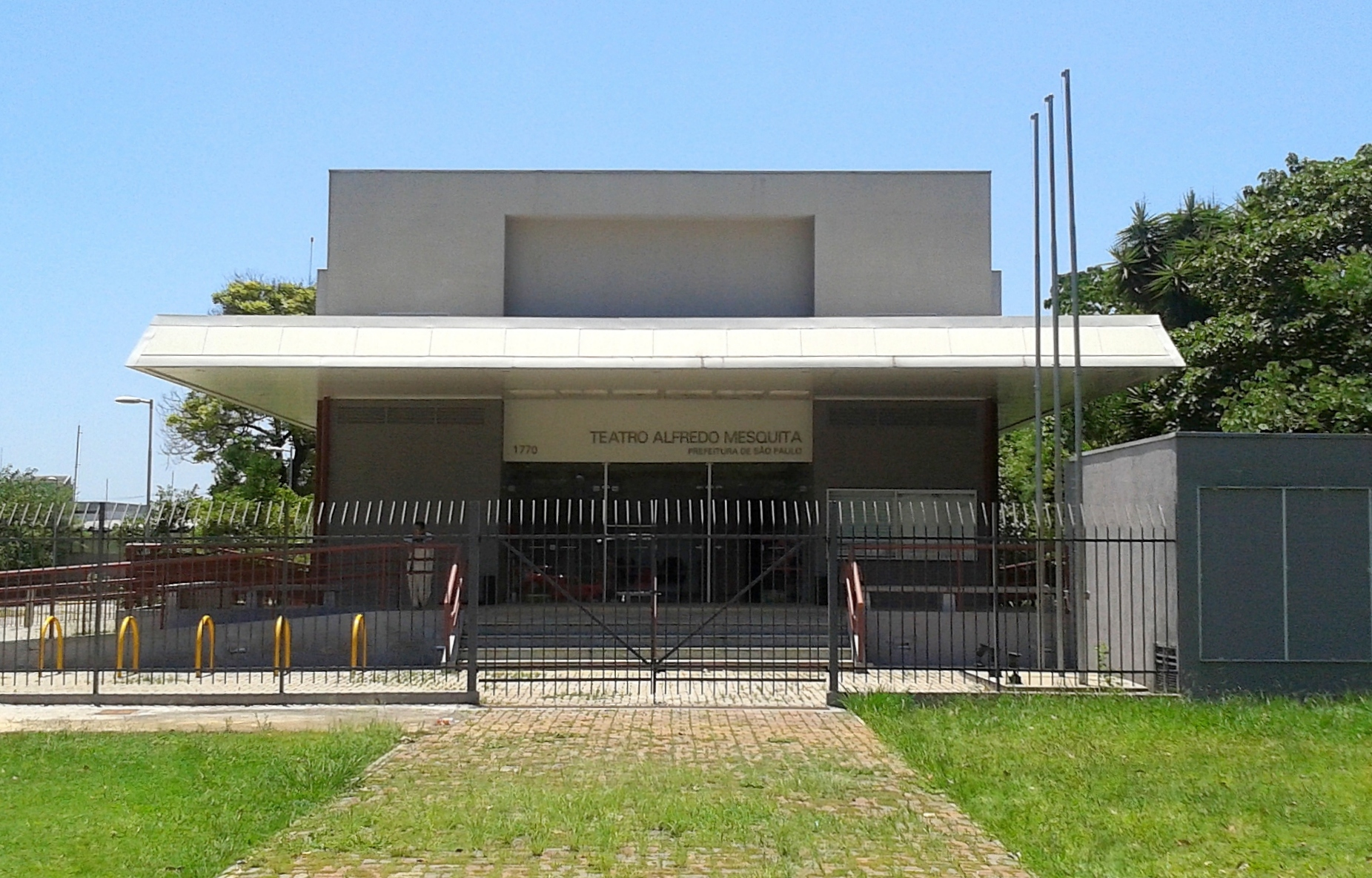
- Theater exterior (2015)
- Interactive map of the Teatro Alfredo Mesquita area

General information
- Location: Av. Santos Dumont, 1770; Santana, São Paulo, Brazil
- Coordinates: 23°30′44.8″S 46°37′43.19″W
- Inaugurated: 1 December 1988; 37 years ago

Teatro Alfredo Mesquita is a theatre in São Paulo, Brazil. Inaugurated on 1 December 1988, it is used for presentations of dance performances and theater, and houses a small orchestra. The name of the theatre is a posthumous tribute to the founder of the School of Dramatic Art (EAD), Alfredo Mesquita.
