= Anhembi Convention Center =

Convention center in São Paulo, Brazil

Anhembi Parque
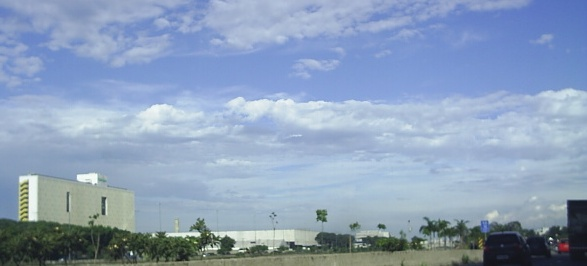
- Holiday Inn and the Pavilhão de Exposições

- Location within São Paulo Anhembi Convention Center (Brazil)
- Former names: Anhembi Eventos e Turismo de São Paulo (1970–91); Centro de Convenções Anhembi (1991–2004)
- Address: Av. Olavo Fontoura, 1209 Santana; São Paulo - SP; 02012-021; Brazil
- Coordinates: 23°30′59.00″S 46°38′10.00″W
- Owner: Prefeitura do Município de São Paulo
- Operator: São Paulo Turismo

Construction
- Opened: 20 November 1970
- Renovated: 1985, 1991, 1993, 1996, 2002, 2004, 2012
- Demolished: 2023
- Cost: NCr$100,000

Website
- Venue Website

Anhembi Parque was a convention center located in Santana, a district of São Paulo, Brazil. At 400,000 square meters of indoor space and 93,000 meters of outdoor space, it was one of the largest event grounds in Latin America. The center was home to 20+ large annual fairs, each drawing in excess of 50,000 visitors, and hosts the annual Carnival of São Paulo. It was built in 1970 by the Companhia Brasileira Fichet & Schwartz Hautmont, under the engineer Raymond Faure and architect Jorge Wilheim. It was demolished in 2023.

== Venues ==
Pavilhão de Exposições Caio de Alcântara Machado

- Pavilhão Norte/Sul - main exhibition hall
- Pavilhão Oeste - annex to main exhibition hall, opened 2 January 2002

Polo Cultural e Esportivo Grande Otelo

- Sambódromo do Anhembi, opened 1 February 1991, capacity 29,199
- Arena Anhembi - outdoor concert venue, capacity of 40,000, opened on 5 December 2004, originally known as "Arena Skol Anhembi" until August 2012
- Nova Arena Anhembi - outdoor venue, primarily used for sporting events and music festivals, capacity of 24,000, opened in 2012
- Espaço Anhembi - banquet hall, opened October 2012, capacity 3,200

Palácio das Convenções

- Auditório Celso Furtado - auditorium, opened 16 June 1972, capacity 2,502
- Auditório Elis Regina - auditorium, opened on 29 July 1985, capacity 799
- Auditório 8 - lecture hall, capacity 124
- Auditório 9 - lecture hall, capacity 281

== Arena Anhembi ==
The arena hosted shows for audiences of more than 30,000 people, a space that became the scene of major national and international shows, including:

- Aerosmith
- Amy Winehouse
- Angra
- Arcade Fire
- Arctic Monkeys
- Backstreet Boys
- Basement Jaxx
- Big Time Rush
- Bring Me the Horizon
- Britney Spears
- Bruno Mars
- DAY6
- Demi Lovato
- Dua Lipa
- Carlos Santana
- Elton John
- Florence and the Machine
- Genesis
- Green Day
- Guns N' Roses
- Imagine Dragons
- Iron Maiden
- Jack Johnson
- Jennifer Lopez
- John Mayer
- Judas Priest
- Justin Bieber
- Kelly Clarkson
- Kings of Leon
- Kiss
- LCD Soundsystem
- Linkin Park
- Maroon 5
- Metallica
- Miley Cyrus
- Ne-Yo
- Nick Jonas
- Oasis
- Ozzy Osbourne
- RBD
- Red Hot Chili Peppers
- Rihanna
- Roger Waters
- Roxette
- Sensation
- Sepultura
- Shakira
- Simple Plan
- Slipknot
- System of a Down
- The Black Eyed Peas
- The Bravery
- The Cure
- The Killers
- The Prodigy
- The Strokes
- The Wanted
- Whitesnake
