= Bom Retiro (district of São Paulo) =

District of São Paulo, Brazil

Coordinates: 23°32′00″S 46°39′00″W

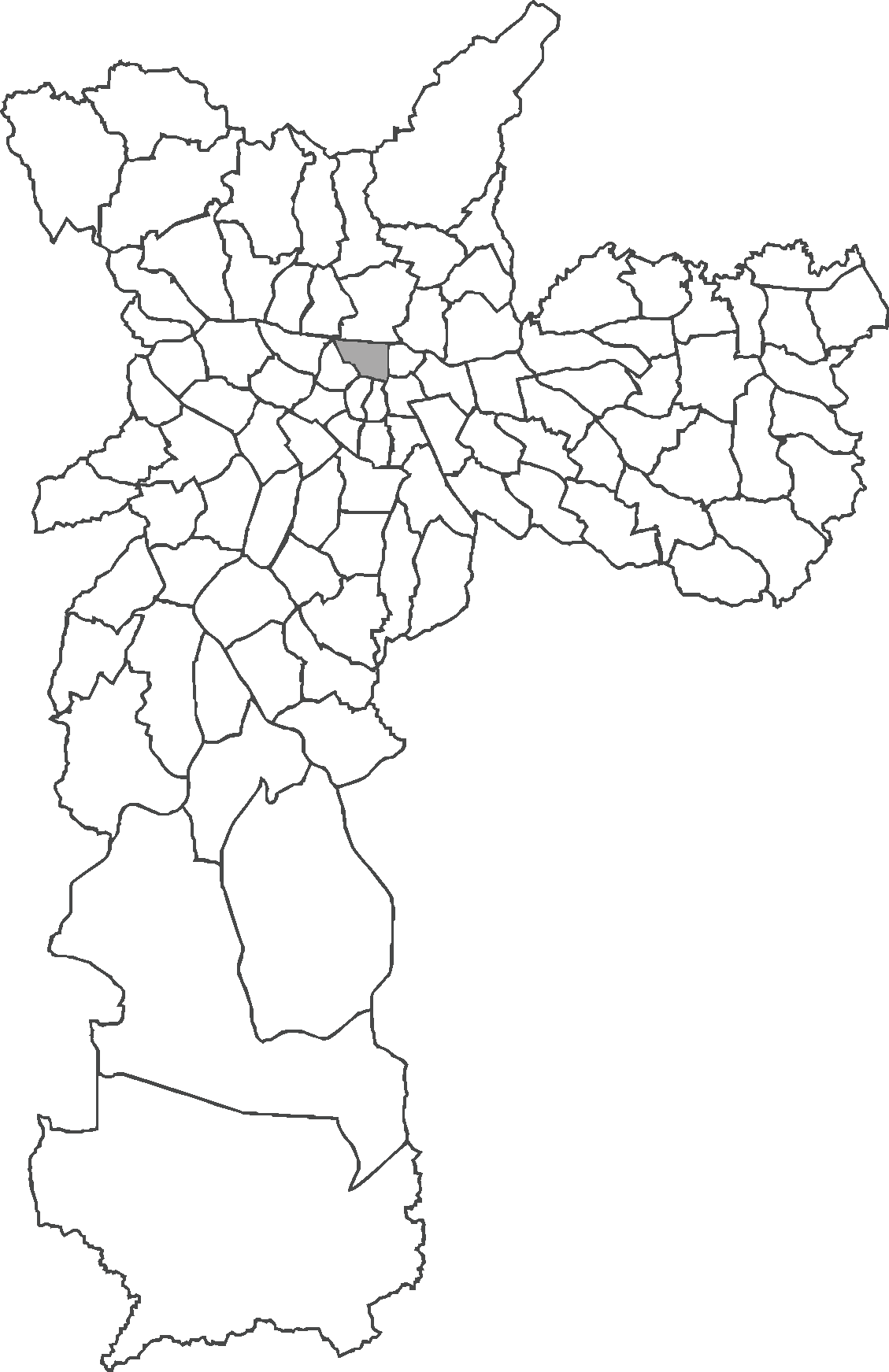
- Location in the city of São Paulo

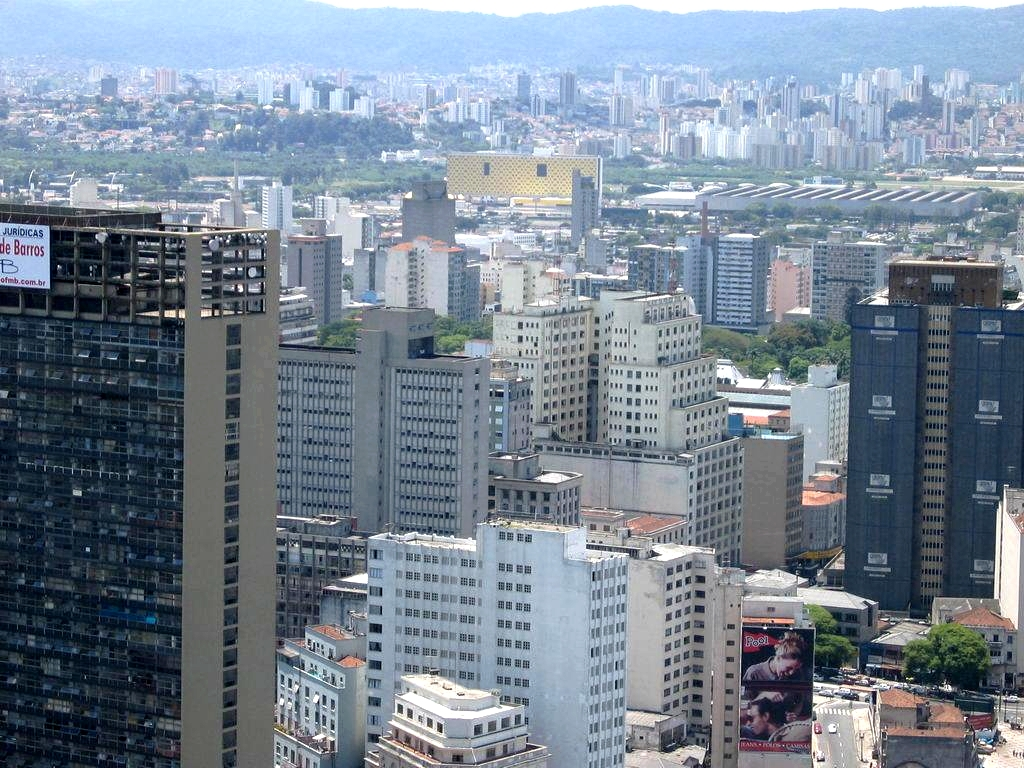
- Country: Brazil
- State: São Paulo
- City: São Paulo

Government
  - Type: Subprefecture
  - Subprefect: Amauri Luiz Pastorello

Area
  - Total: 4 km^{2} (1.5 sq mi)

Population (2000)
  - Total: 26,598
  - Density: 6,650/km^{2} (17,200/sq mi)
- HDI: 0.864 –high
- Website: Subprefecture of Sé

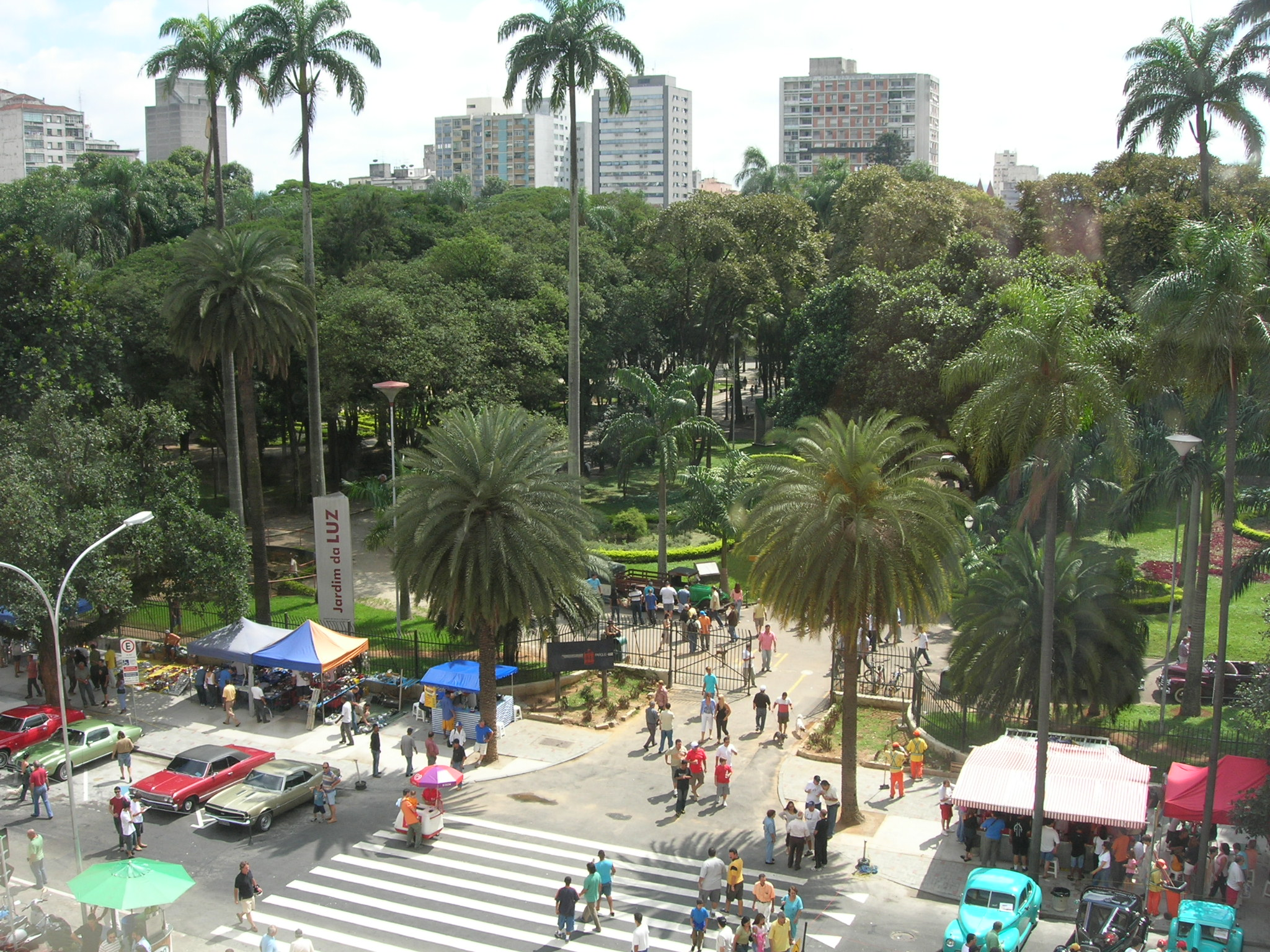
Photograph of Jardim da Luz

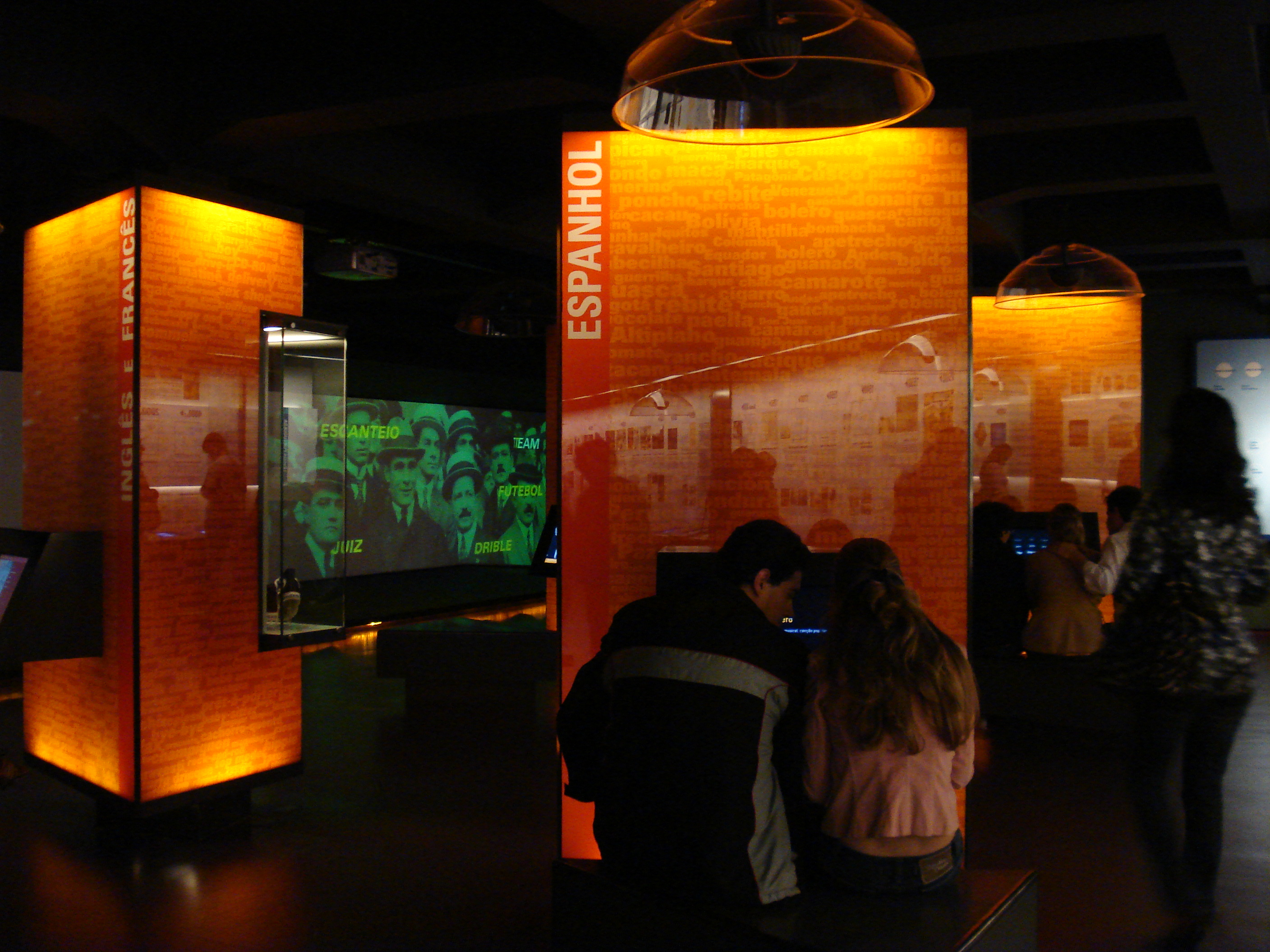
Museum of the Portuguese Language

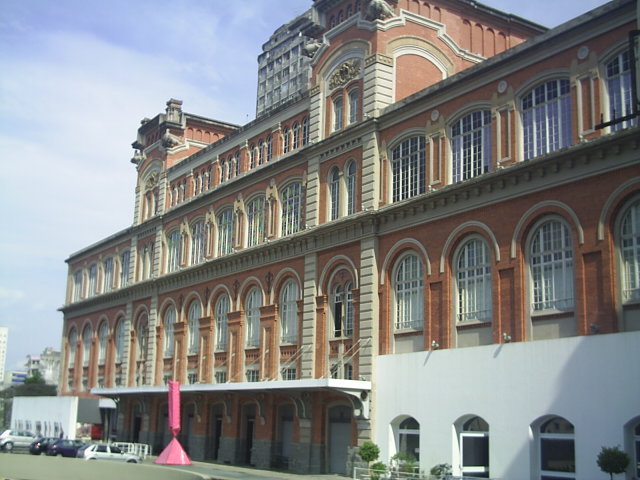
Estação Pinacoteca

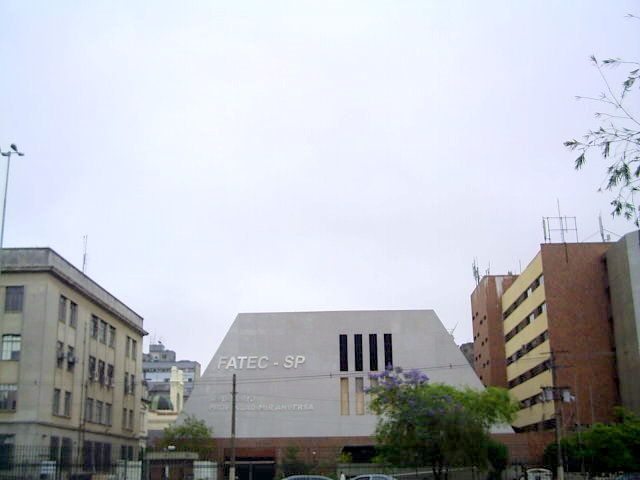
FATEC

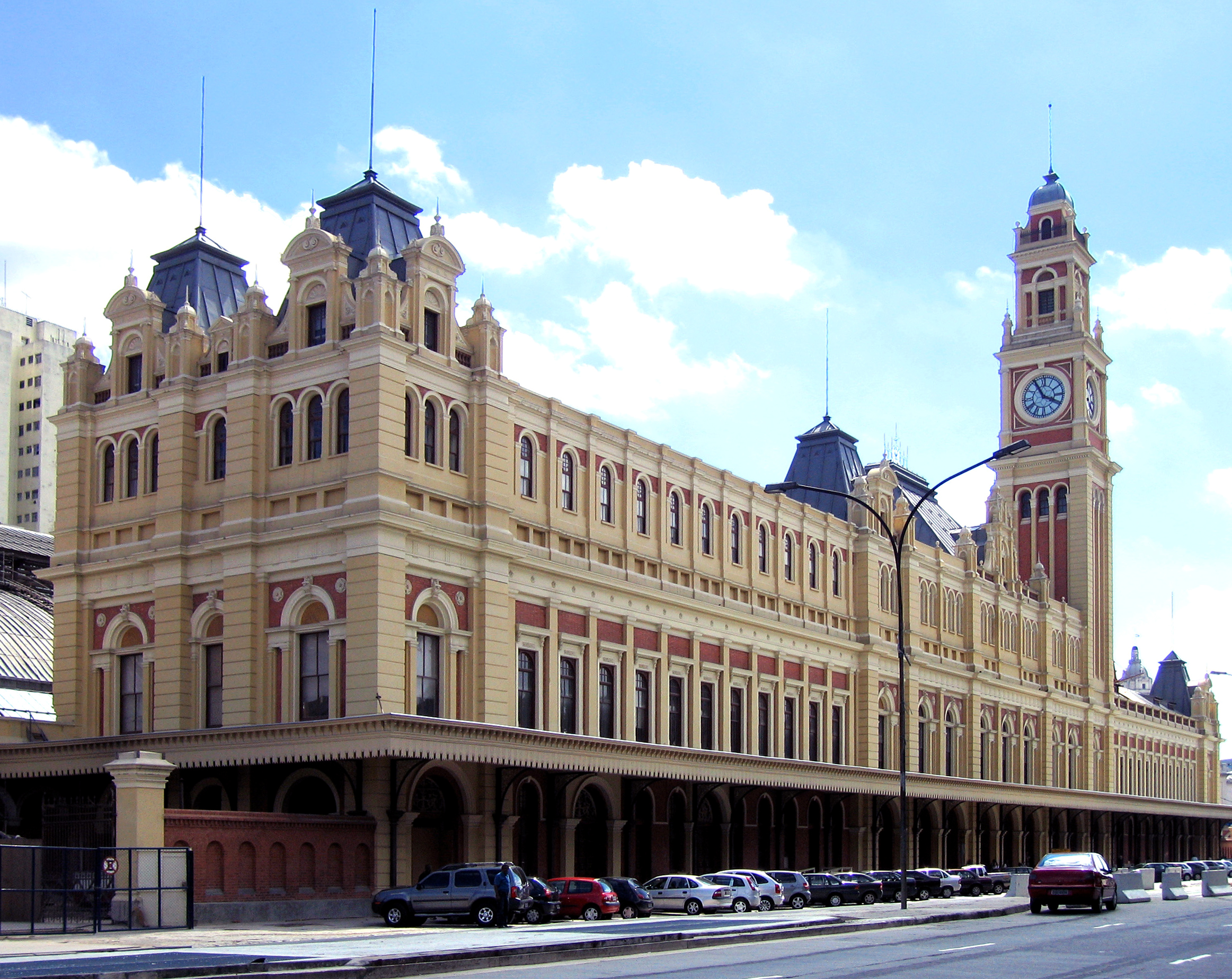
Estação da Luz

Bom Retiro is a central district in the city of São Paulo, Brazil. It is primarily commercial but has industrial and residential areas.

The district is served by Line 1 (Blue) of the São Paulo Metro and by the lines 7 (Ruby), 10 (Turquoise), and 11 (Coral) of the CPTM. There is also a planned station for Line 4 (Yellow) of the São Paulo Metro.

== Formation ==
In the late 19th century and the early 20th century, Bom Retiro was considered to be a modern region. The Luz and the Júlio Prestes railway stations, along with Jardim da Luz, then São Paulo's only public park, were elegant examples of European-influenced Luz Station which was actually built in England while the architecture and landscaping were put together in Brazil.

It was originally an industrial section. In the 1960s, factories began being replaced by active clothing and fashion retail stores and textile and weaving small businesses. The neighborhood had an influx of Mediterranean immigrants such as Italians, Greeks, European Jews and Levantine Arabs from what is now Lebanon and Syria. In greater numbers, the Italians settled in the sections of Bela Vista, Brás, Ipiranga, and Barra Funda and other parts of the state. The Jewish presence was especially felt in the Rua Prates area, with the Renascenca school and college, synagogues, and Kosher stores and restaurants, some of which are still active. After acquiring prosperity from their retail businesses, many Jews migrated to the newer and more affluent sections of Higienopolis, Cerqueira Cesar and Jardins. The Syrian-Lebanese dominated the Rua José Paulino shopping centers as well as the more affluent Paraíso and Vila Mariana neighborhoods near the starting point of the Avenida Paulista new financial center.

Bom Retiro was the entry gate of the immigrant arrivals from the port of Santos, who landed in the city by train via Luz station, or continued their journey towards the coffee plantations in the state interior via the Santos-Jundiai line or shifted to the São Paulo Railway line, later E.F. Sorocabana at Julio Prestes station towards São Paulo State's SW, NW, and Parana' State. Julio Prestes now operates only local trains in the Greater São Paulo region and had some of its halls transformed into the State of the Art Sala Cidade de São Paulo Concert Hall, home to the São Paulo Symphonic Orchestra. Luz Sta. has trains to the Eastern suburb cities of the Greater São Paulo region, such as Santo André, Mogi das Cruzes, Suzano and Poá. In addition, the Jundiaí line still serves that city and the São Paulo's Westside sections suburbs, such as Barra Funda, Lapa, Piqueri, Pirituba, Caieiras, Franco da Rocha, and Francisco Morato. A section of Luz station has been transformed into the interactive Museu da Lingua Portuguesa, the world's only Lusophone—Portuguese language related—museum dedicated in the mid-2000s (decade) with the presence of Portuguese, Brazilian, African and Asian authorities of those countries once ruled by the Portuguese crown. It is an important stop for those who study the language and the field of Linguistics, as well as anthropology, uses of language, folklore, language development and foreign influences, dialects, poetry, music, origin of names of foods and utensils and other curiosities. The Pinacoteca do Estado de São Paulo, the Museu de Arte Sacra de São Paulo—Sacred Art Museum, with an impressive Brazilian Baroc Art collection and a giant Nativity Scene from Naples, the Pinacoteca Station Art Institute, and the Centre for Music Studies - Tom Jobim are also in the area. The old building of the Polytechnic School of the University of São Paulo now holds the State of São Paulo Technical College and the São Paulo Federal Technical School.

Jardim da Luz is considered the oldest park in the city and one of the few green areas in the central region of São Paulo, with many sculptures and other forms of artwork displayed and kept by the Pinacoteca Museum, which is located next to it. Drug activity is not uncommon in its surroundings, which gave the region a bad reputation as the "Cracolandia," or "Crackheadland." Despite the City's attempt to revamp the area by remodeling buildings and giving incentives to big businesses to settle in the area, its conditions haven't been fully refurbished, both in structure and safety. With the São Paulo Old Centro Renaissance efforts, most of the homeless and drug addict demographic has moved further towards the Republica and Sé Square regions, splitting in smaller groups around the city. The Luz metro and train stations, as well as at the MASP São Paulo Art Museum at avenida Paulista, have gone through efforts to keep high survaillance in order to ensure the safety of both the visitors and the valuable art stored in those institutes.

The José Paulino Street's clothing retail shops and sweatshops, along with the Rua 25 de Março bargain clothing stores have been often owned by Koreans and Chinese immigrants. Bom Retiro is known as the second largest Asian community in the city, only beat by Liberdade, which is home to the largest Japanese community outside of Japan. Koreans are now known to control two thirds of the clothing retail business and their materials travel all over Brazil.

On 6 January 2010, the São Paulo City Council officially recognised Bom Retiro as being the Korean cultural neighbourhood. On 13 April 2017, São Paulo's mayor João Doria reported during his trip to South Korea, that neighborhood's name Bom Retiro could be altered to Bom Retiro Little Seul, but changed his mind due to negative reactions on public opinion.

== Borders ==
- North: Tietê River;
- South: Mauá Street/Railway of CPTM (Lines A, D, and E);
- East: Cruzeiro do Sul Avenue and Estado Avenue;
- West: Railway of CPTM (Line B), Engenheiro Orlando Murgel Viaduct, Rudge Avenue, and Casa Verde Bridge (beginning).
- Item de lista com marcadores

== Neighboring districts ==
- Santana (North);
- Pari (East);
- Brás (Southeast);
- Sé and República (South);
- Santa Cecília and Barra Funda (West).

== Principal attractions ==
- Pinacoteca do Estado de São Paulo;
- Luz Station (CPTM);
- Museum of the Portuguese Language;
- Júlio Prestes Station;
- Sala São Paulo;
- Pinacoteca Station;
- Museu de Arte Sacra;
- Igreja de Santo Antônio de Sant'Ana Galvão.

== Trivia ==
- The Hospedaria dos Imigrantes ("Immigrants' Inn") was situated in Bom Retiro. It remained there until the 1880s, when it moved to Brás.
- Bom Retiro was once a neighborhood where the Italian and Jewish communities predominated. Nowadays, the Korean, and Bolivian presence is very strong.
- Sport Club Corinthians Paulista, one of the main soccer teams in São Paulo, was founded by residents of Bom Retiro, in the year of 1910, in Rua José Paulino.
- O Ano em Que Meus Pais Saíram de Férias is a film that takes place in 1970 in Bom Retiro. The film is about the 1970 FIFA World Cup and the military dictatorship that took place after the 1964 Brazilian coup d'état. It also shows how strong the central European Jewish and Italian immigrant concentration was (a soccer match between the Italians and the Jews was held in Bom Retiro).
