= Santana (district of São Paulo) =

District of São Paulo, Brazil

Coordinates: 23°31′00″S 46°37′37″W

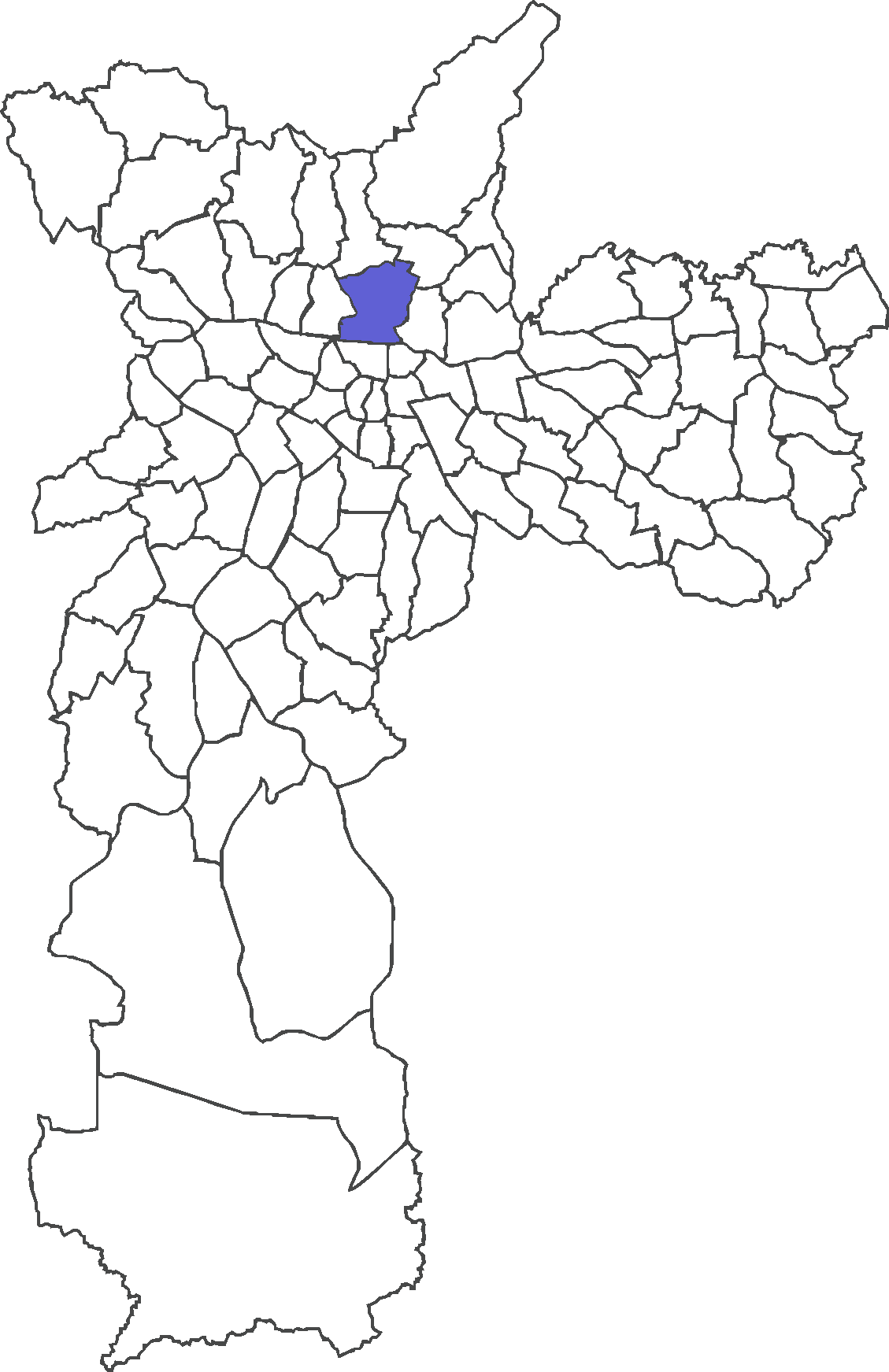
- Location in the city of São Paulo

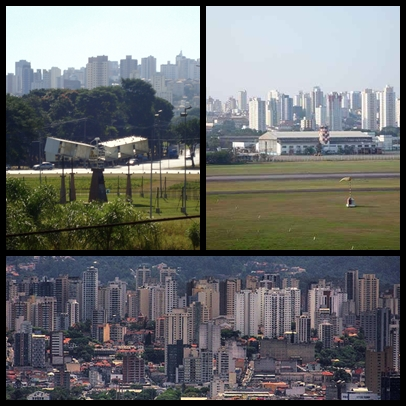
- Skyscraper of the district. Top left:A display of 14-Bis aircraft monument in Campo de Bagatello Park, Top right:Campo de Marte Airport, Bottom:View of Downtown Santana
- Country: Brazil
- State: São Paulo
- City: São Paulo

Government
  - Type: Subprefecture
  - Subprefect: Helio Rubens Gonçalves Figueiredo

Area
  - Total: 12.6 km^{2} (4.9 sq mi)

Population (2008)
  - Total: 110,086
  - Density: 9,527/km^{2} (24,670/sq mi)
- HDI: 0.925 –very high
- Website: Subprefecture of Santana

Santana (Portuguese pronunciation: [sɐ̃ˈtɐnɐ]; from Portuguese Santa Ana, meaning Saint Anne) is a northern district in the subprefecture of Santana-Tucuruvi of the city of São Paulo, Brazil, and is located between 4–7 km (2.5–4.3 mi) from downtown São Paulo.

Originating from the Sant’Ana Farm, property of the Society of Jesus that was first mentioned in 1560 by Father José de Anchieta, it functioned as the green belt of "São Paulo dos Campos de Piratininga". The farm's lands were divided into sesmarias at the beginning of the 19th century.

== History ==
The district of peace of "Santana" (Distrito de Paz de Santana) was created in 1898, and its boundaries changed over the years with the creation of new sub-districts in the north of the city through the municipal law of 1986. However, the origins of the region of Santana are very old, with the district's foundation date recognized as July 26, 1782.

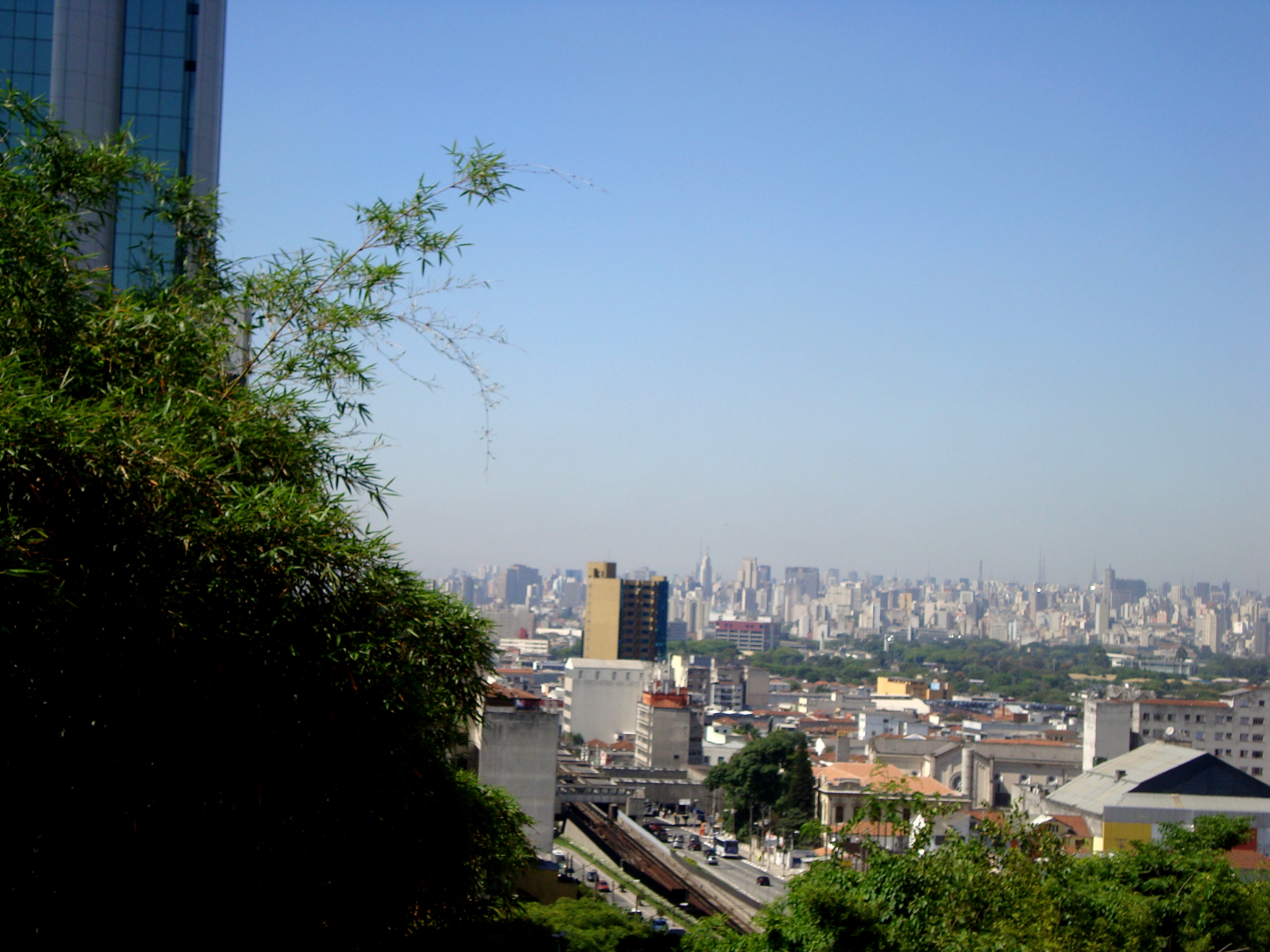
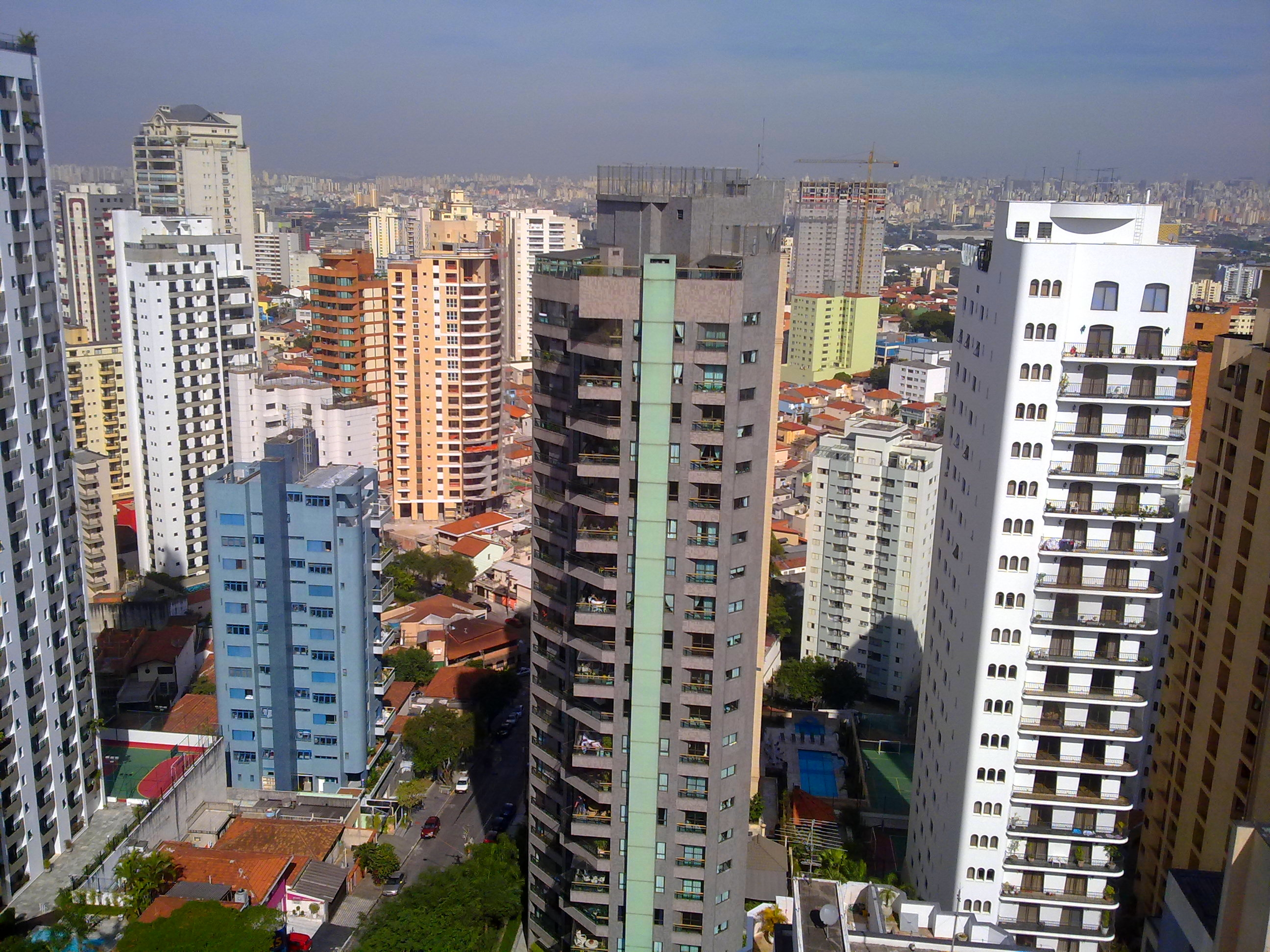

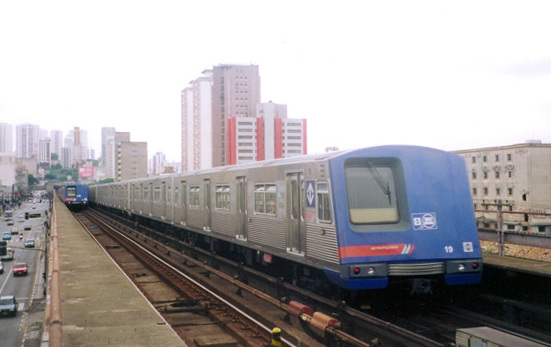
Various parts of Santana: Santana's downtown, Santana High and São Paulo Metro in Santana.

Santana is a district which, despite formerly being a central core north of São Paulo, was long isolated from the rest of the city due to natural barriers such as the Rio Tietê and Serra da Cantareira. This isolation remained until the beginning of the 20th century. Since then, like the rest of the city, Santana has developed rapidly due to industrialization and the wealth generated by the coffee trade throughout the State of São Paulo.

Years later, the district of Santana completed its integration with the rest of the city by the construction of the North-South line (now Line 1 (Blue)) of the São Paulo Metro in the 1970s.

== Santana today ==
Santana is now an important commercial and residential district in São Paulo. It exerts strong regional influence in commerce as well as culture and entertainment. The district is served by four stations of Line 1 (Blue) of the São Paulo Metro, the Campo de Marte Airport and the Tietê Bus Terminal. The historic center profited from its large buildings, many shops, and private universities. The district attracts increasingly more visitors (mostly, but no longer exclusively, on business) because of the Anhembi Convention Center.

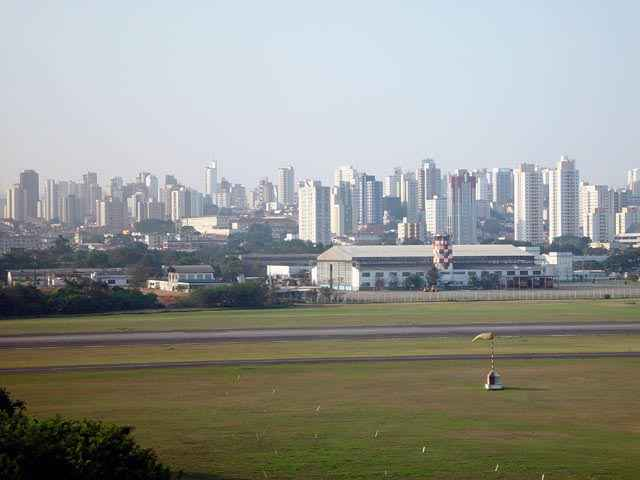
Campo de Marte Airport

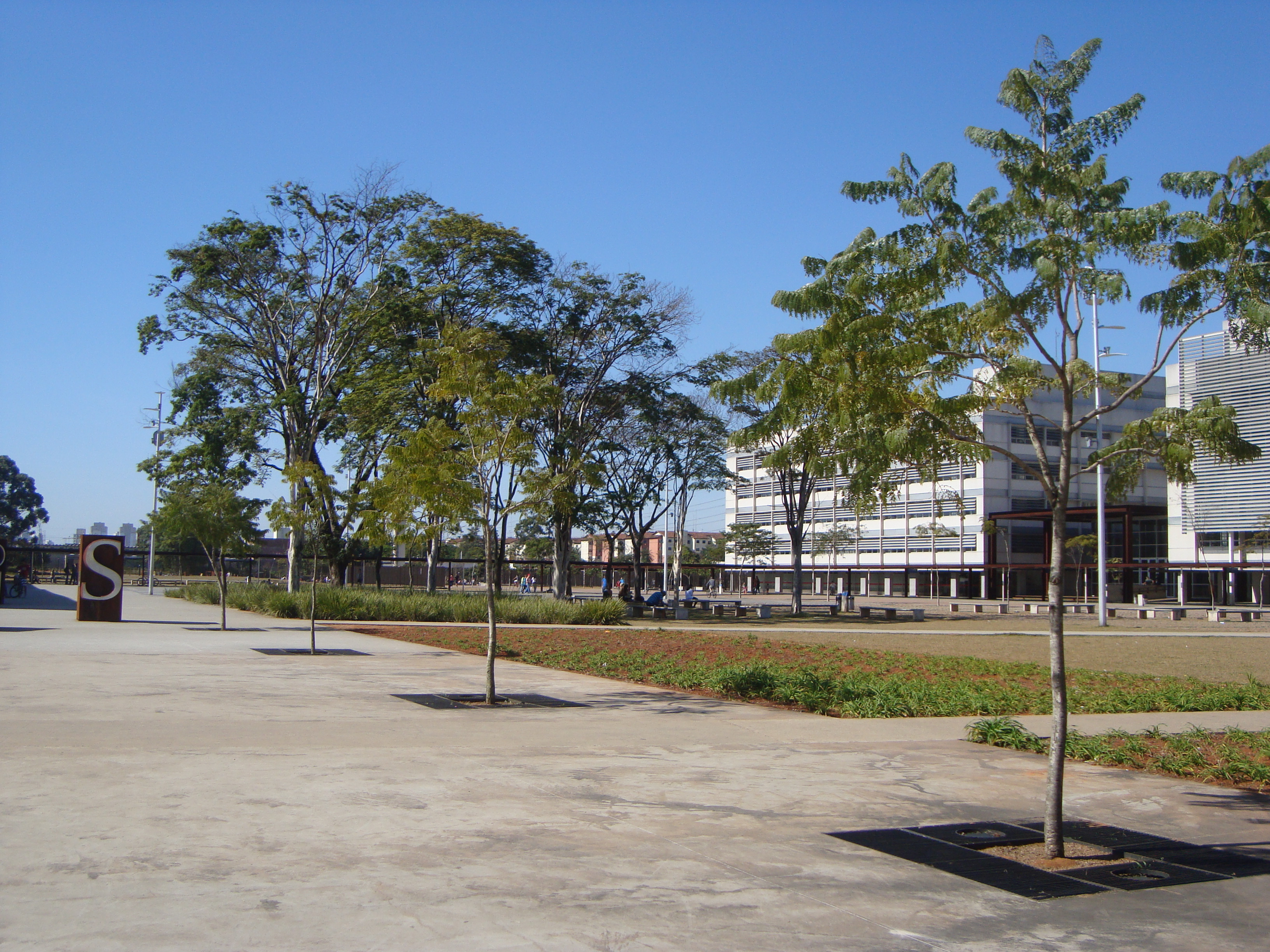
Parque da Juventude

The bairros within Santana are: Vila Paulicéia, Vila José Casa Grande, Jardim Guanandi, Santana, Vila Bianca, Chora Menino (Cemitério Municipal de Santana), Santa Terezinha, Jardim São Paulo, Vila Siciliano, Vila Matias, Vila Zélia, Vila Santa Luzia, Vila Rabelo, Jardim Carmen Verônica, Vila Santana, Vila Mariza Mazzei, Água Fria, Jardim do Colégio, Sítio Pedra Branca, and a small part of Imirim.

Santana is one of the fastest growing districts in the city, experiencing a boom in construction of residential properties in the last few years. Santana's economy consists of large businesses (commercial centres and stores) and a few industries.

=== Education ===
There are five universities, along with a number of private and public institutions located here. Some public schools are funded by the state of São Paulo while others are funded by the municipality of São Paulo. The district also offers three theatres: (Teatro Alfredo Mesquita, Teatro Jardim São Paulo [attached to the Colégio Jardim São Paulo] and SESC Santana Theatre) and three public libraries: (Narbal Fontes, Nuto Santanna and São Paulo). Many of Santana's private schools offers both primary and secondary education. There are several church-ran institutions, following Santana's strong Catholic traditions.

== Principal attractions and events ==
- Anhembi Convention Center (one of the largest event grounds in Latin America)
- Campo de Marte Airport
- Juventude's Park (Parque da Juventude)
- São Paulo's Carnival
- São Paulo Indy 300
- São Paulo's March for Jesus
- São Paulo Auto Show (Salão do Automóvel)
- May Day Show of Sindical Force (Show do 1º de Maio da Força Sindical)

== Transportation ==
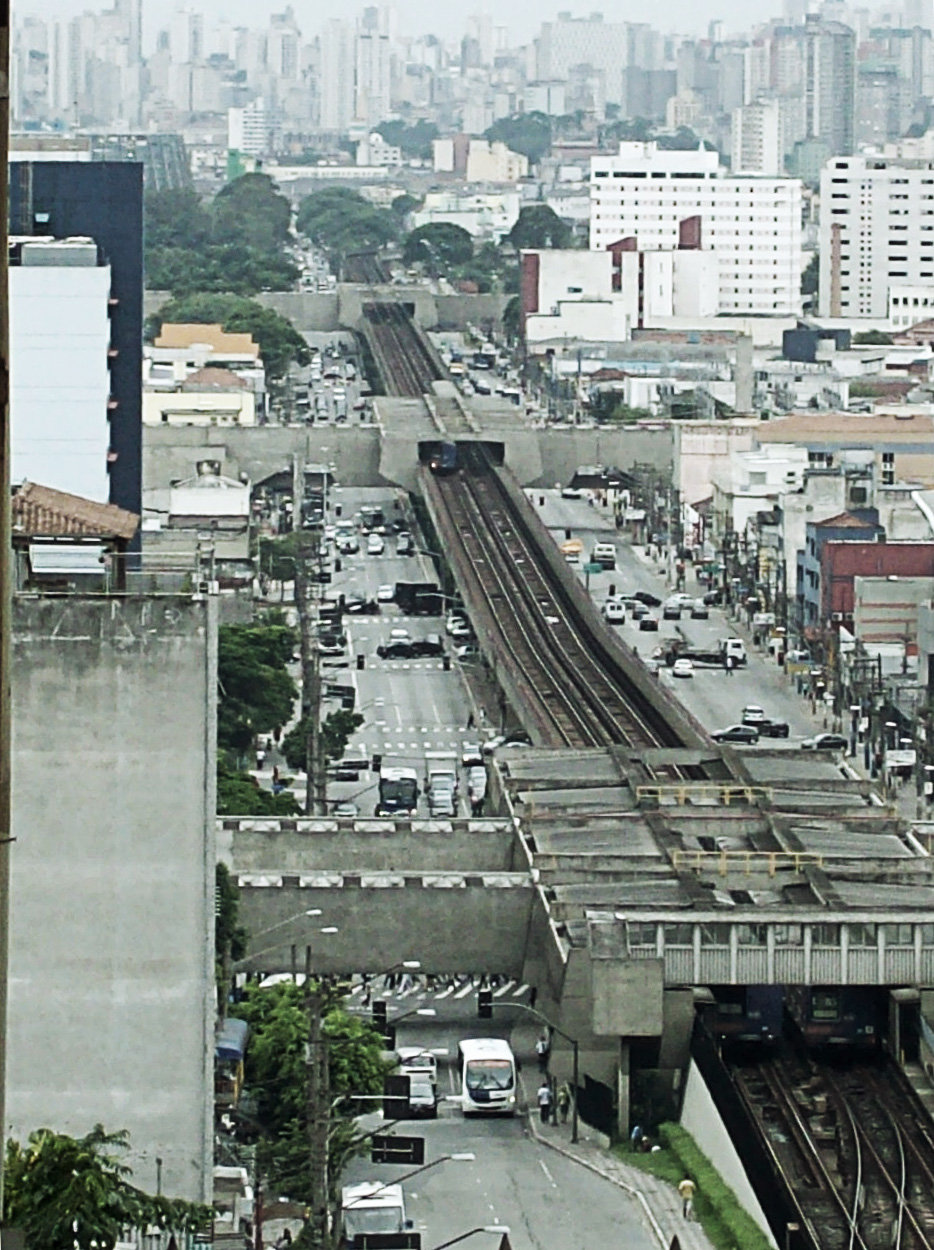
The Santana's subway stations.

=== Buses ===
The district is served by many bus routes that connect the area to the city centre, neighbouring districts of the north-east zone and other areas. Santana has the Tietê Bus Terminal (Terminal Rodoviário Tietê), that connects São Paulo to other cities in Brazil and Santana Bus Terminal (Terminal Santana).

=== Metro ===
The São Paulo Metro has four stations on Line 1 (Blue) in Santana: Portuguesa-Tietê, Carandiru, Santana, and Jardim São Paulo.

== Notable people ==
- Ayrton Senna (1960-1994), racing driver
