= Tucuruvi (São Paulo Metro) =

São Paulo Metro station

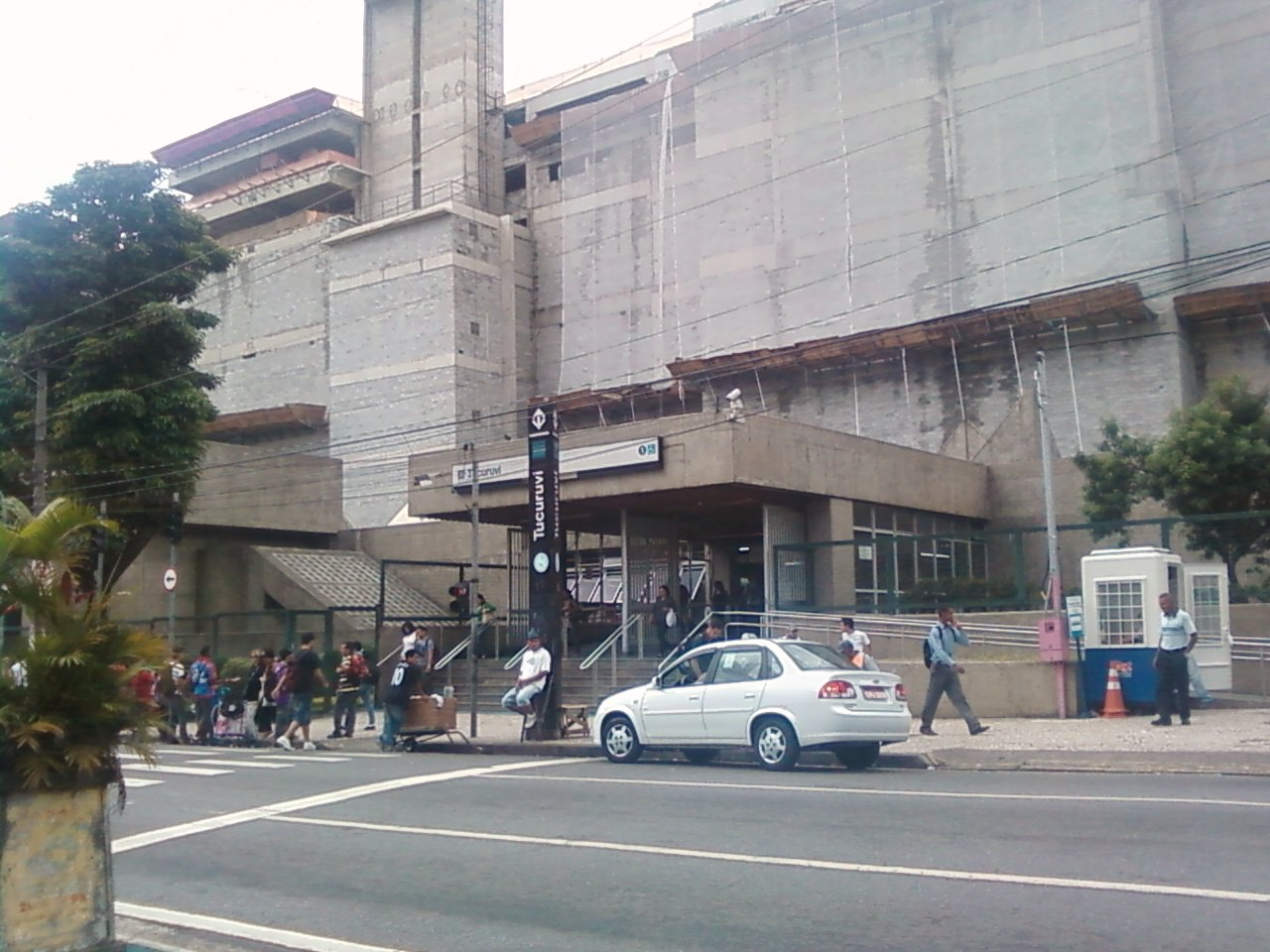
- Tucuruvi station in 2012. Behind it, the construction of Metrô Tucuruvi Shopping Mall.

General information
- Location: Av. Dr. Antonio Maria Laet, 100, Tucuruvi; São Paulo; Brazil
- Coordinates: 23°28′48″S 46°36′12″W
- Owner: Government of the State of São Paulo
- Operator: Companhia do Metropolitano de São Paulo
- Platforms: Side platforms
- Connections: Tucuruvi Bus Terminal; Guarulhos–São Paulo Metropolitan Corridor

Construction
- Structure type: Semi-underground
- Accessible: y

Other information
- Station code: TUC

History
- Opened: 29 April 1998

Passengers
- 57,000/business day

Services
Preceding station	São Paulo Metro	Following station
Terminus	Line 1	Parada Inglesa towards Jabaquara
Track layout
Location

Tucuruvi is a metro station on São Paulo Metro Line 1-Blue, located in the district of Tucuruvi in São Paulo. It was opened on 29 April 1998, as part of the Line 1 north expansion plan.

== History ==
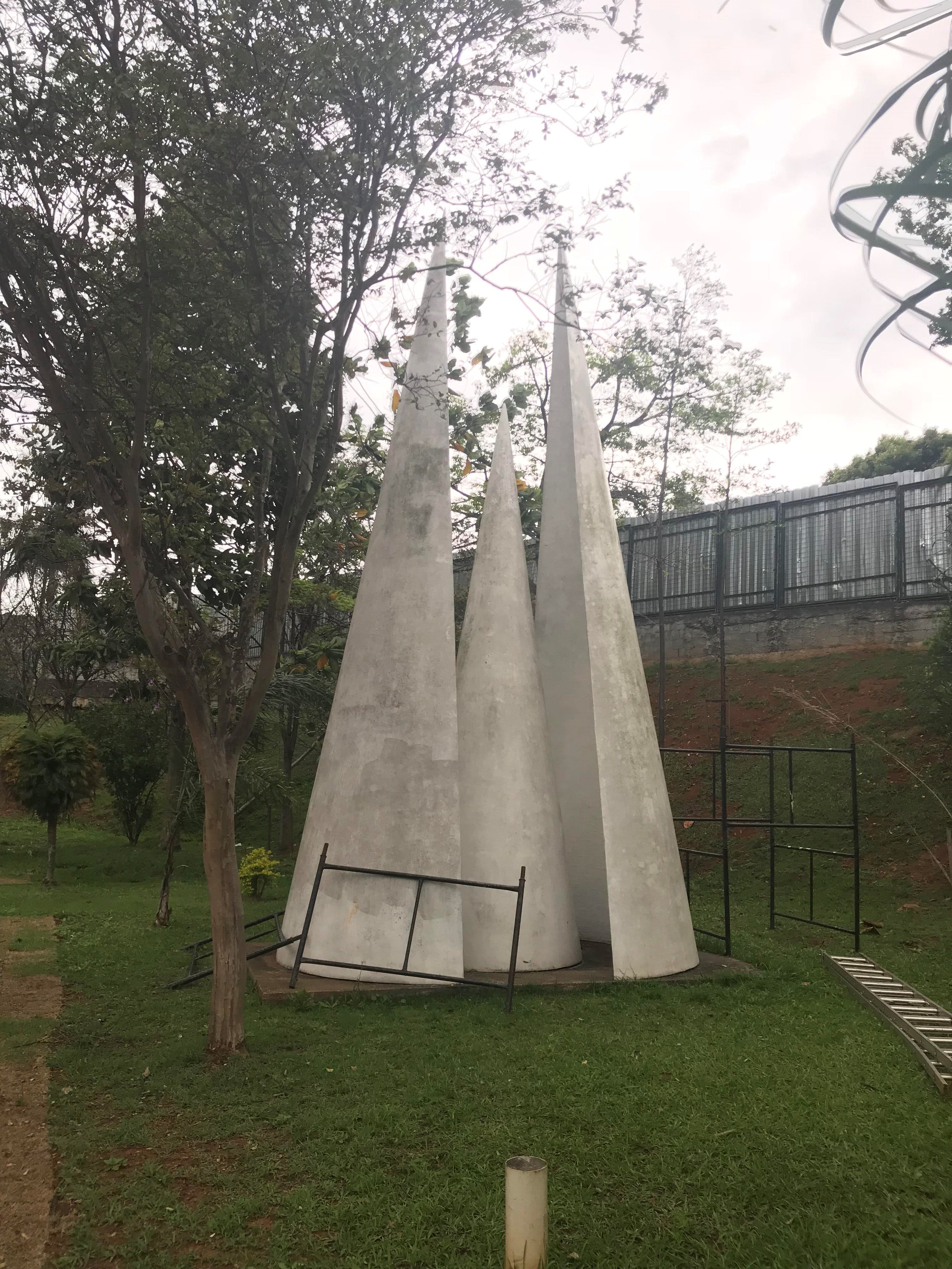
Ogô Monument, made by Tatti Moreno in iron, polyethylene resin, and epoxy paint with dimensions: 7 metres (23 ft) × 3.3 metres (11 ft), installed in Tucuruvi station.

The project of Tucuruvi station arose in 1978, during the first update of HMD plan (originally contracted by Metro in 1968), after receiving the data from the 1977 "Origin-Destination" research. Besides the definition of the expansion directives to Tucuruvi, the construction was contracted only in 1986, not before being target by two controversies.

The first of them came from the fact that the Metro chose an area in Avenida Doutor Antonio Maria Laet. In a letter to the newspaper Folha de São Paulo, a resident of the region made a series of inquiries, among them that the location proposed by the Metro was of hard access for the region residents from south of the avenue, and proposed the construction of Avenida Tucuruvi. In response, the Chairman of Metro, Walter Bernardes Mory, alleged that the station in the proposed location would have a higher cost (with special ventilation equipments, escalators and elevators) and would require a great depth.

The second controversy came from the attorney and candidate for federal deputy candidate by the Brazilian Labor Party (PTB), Marco Antonio Perez Alves, who published an announcement of a quarter page in Folha de S. Paulo, denouncing a supposed scheme of targeting of construction biddings (made in September 1986) to determined companies. In the case of Tucuruvi station, the construction would be targeted to the constructor CBPO. In fact, CBPO won the bidding, besides the complaint didn't evoke reactions from authorities.

The construction of the station began in May 1988, with opening scheduled for 1990. However, the state was in the beginning of an economic crisis, which would take it to an intervention in Banespa and a high debt of the Metro with the Brazilian Development Bank. This way, the construction was interrupted and resumed many times, until being interrupted in mid-1994 (when the station was predicted to open) and resumed in 1996 (through a concession of the ticket offices revenues to the constructors for 15 years), with the opening on 29 April 1998.

To celebrate the return of train tracks to Tucuruvi, removed in 1965, during the deactivation of Cantareira Tramway, the State Government hired a concert of the samba group Demônios da Garoa.

=== Shopping Mall ===
Since the expropriation of the areas for the station construction in 1986, Metro predicted the implementation of a large intermunicipal bus terminal to attend the São Paulo North Side residents and Guarulhos. Its construction was delayed to 2002, until being cancelled. Replacing the terminal, Metro chose to build a shopping mall, with a small linear bus terminal, to increase their non-tariff revenues.
