= Jabaquara-Comitê Paralímpico Brasileiro (São Paulo Metro) =

São Paulo Metro station

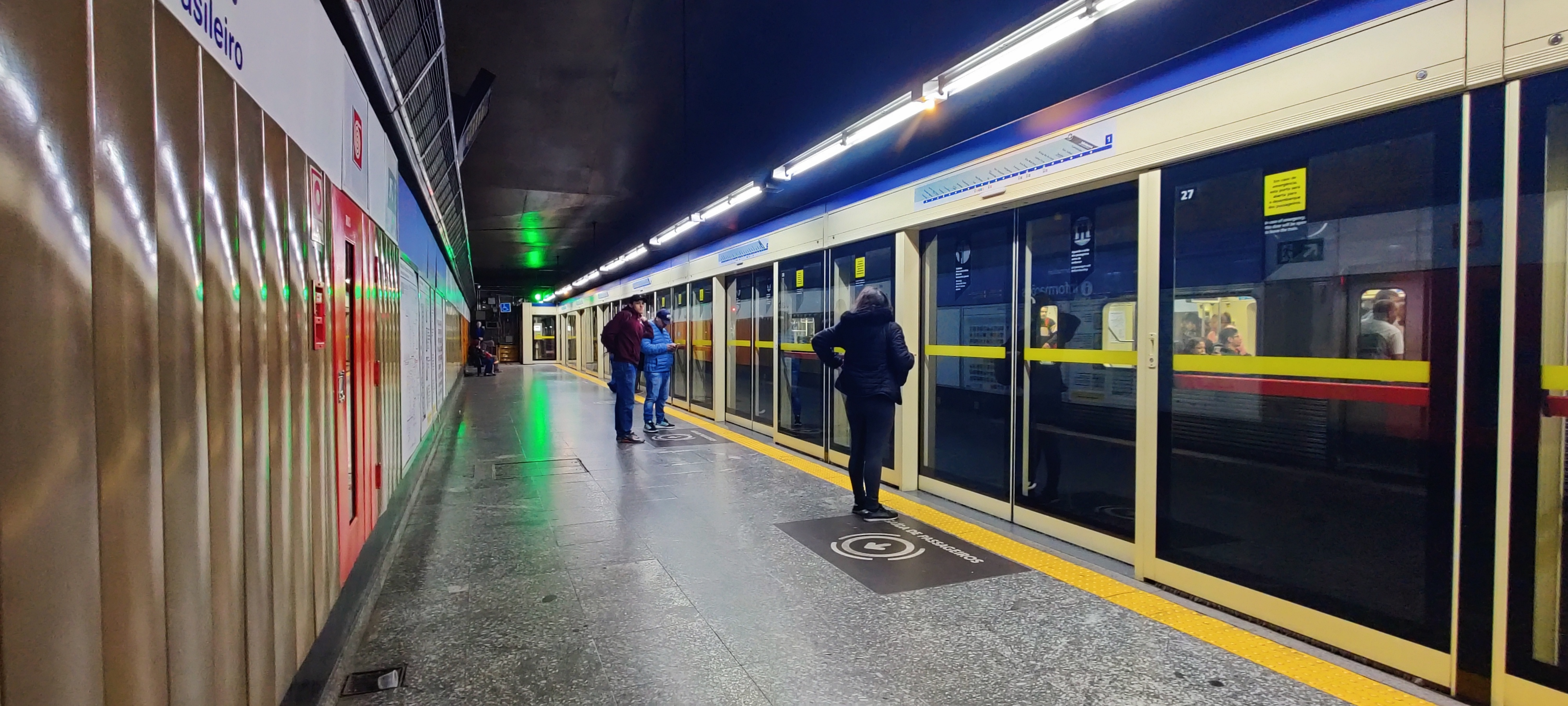

General information
- Other names: Terminal Intermodal Jabaquara
- Location: 80 Rua dos Jequitibás; São Paulo; Brazil
- Coordinates: 23.647134°S 46.640112°W
- Owner: Government of the State of São Paulo
- Operator: Companhia do Metropolitano de São Paulo
- Platforms: Side platforms
- Connections: Jabaquara Metropolitan Terminal; São Mateus–Jabaquara Metropolitan Corridor; São Paulo Zoo shuttle bus service Jabaquara Road Terminal

Construction
- Structure type: Underground
- Accessible: y

Other information
- Station code: JAB

History
- Opened: September 14, 1974
- Former names: Jabaquara

Passengers
- 69,000/business day

Services
Preceding station	São Paulo Metro	Following station
Conceição towards Tucuruvi	Line 1	Terminus
Future services
Hospital Sabóia towards Morumbi	Line 17	Terminus
Track layout
Location

Jabaquara-Comitê Paralímpico Brasileiro is a station on Line 1 (Blue) of the São Paulo Metro and is the current terminus. It will be integrated with the planned Line 17 (Gold).

The station integrates with the Jabaquara Intermunicipal Terminal, allowing passengers to transfer to SPTrans and EMTU bus lines with their Bilhete Único card.

== SPTrans lines ==
The following SPTrans bus lines can be accessed. Passengers may use a Bilhete Único card for transfer:

Linha	Nome da linha
175T-10	Metrô Santana
4721-10	Shopping Plaza Sul
5012-10	Vila Guacuri
5015-10	Jardim São Jorge
5018-10	Shopping Interlagos
5018-31	Shopping Interlagos
5022-10	Vila Santa Margarida
5702-10	Refúgio Santa Terezinha
5791-21	Eldorado
605A-10	Centro Paralimpico

Linha #	Nome da linha
675G-10	Parque Residencial Cocaia
675G-41	Jardim Castro Alves
675M-10	Centro Sesc
695X-10	Terminal Varginha
707K-10	Terminal Guarapiranga
5010-10	Santo Amaro
576C-10	Terminal Santo Amaro
N603-11	Terminal Pinheiros
N604-11	Terminal Parque Dom Pedro ll
N633-11	Shopping Morumbi
N637-11	Vila Missionária
288	São Bernardo do Campo (Terminal Ferrazópolis)
289	Diadema (Terminal Piraporinha)
290	Diadema (Terminal Diadema)
855	Diadema (Taboão)
