= Sauda =

Sauda may refer to:

== Places ==
=== Iceland ===
- Sauðá, a river in the Skagafjörður region

=== Lebanon ===
- Qurnet es-Sauda, the highest point in Lebanon and the Levant

=== Norway ===
- Sauda Municipality, a municipality in Rogaland county
- Sauda (town), a town within Sauda Municipality in Rogaland county
- Sauda Church, a church in the town of Sauda in Rogaland county
- Sauda Smelteverk, a smelting plant in the town of Sauda in Rogaland county
- Sauda Skisenter, a skiing facility, located near the town of Sauda in Rogaland county

=== Syria ===
- Al-Sauda, a town in northwestern Syria

== People ==
- Mirza Muhammad Rafi Sauda, an Urdu poet from Delhi, India

== Other ==
- Sauda-class mine countermeasures vessel, a class of ships in the Royal Norwegian Navy from 1953 to 1996
- Dera Sacha Sauda, a non-profit Social Welfare and Spiritual Organization in Sirsa, Haryana, India
- Sauda (film), a 1995 Hindi-language Indian feature film directed by Ramesh Modi
- Sauda a sword wielding hero tower in Bloons TD 6
