= Saúde =

Saúde (health in the Portuguese language) may refer to:

- Saúde, Bahia
- Saúde, Rio de Janeiro
- Saúde (district of São Paulo)
- Saúde (São Paulo Metro)
- Saúde (album), by Rita Lee
- TV Saúde, a defunct Portuguese television channel

== See also ==
- Saude (disambiguation)
