= Saúde (district of São Paulo) =

District of São Paulo, Brazil

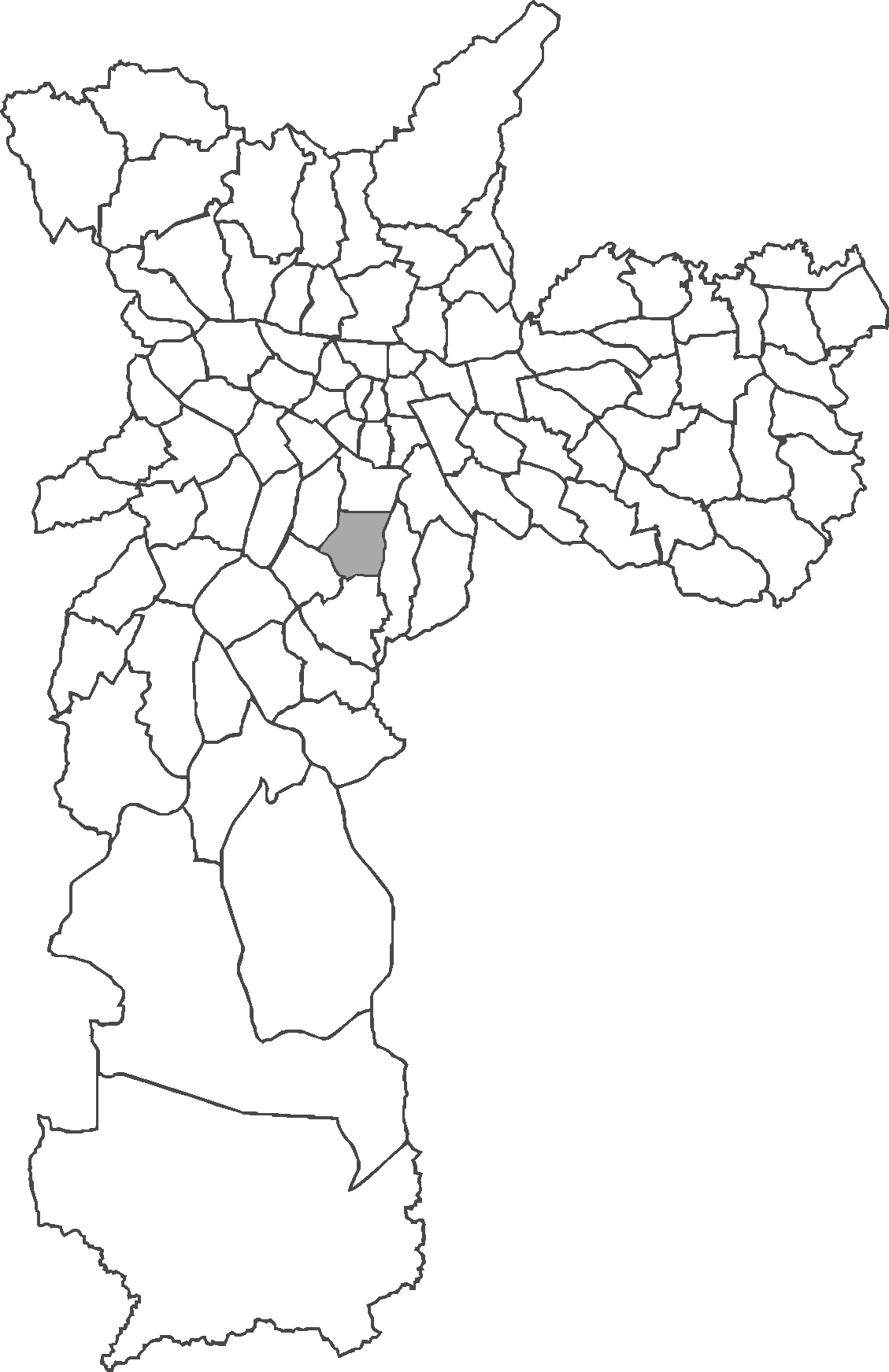
- Location in the city of São Paulo

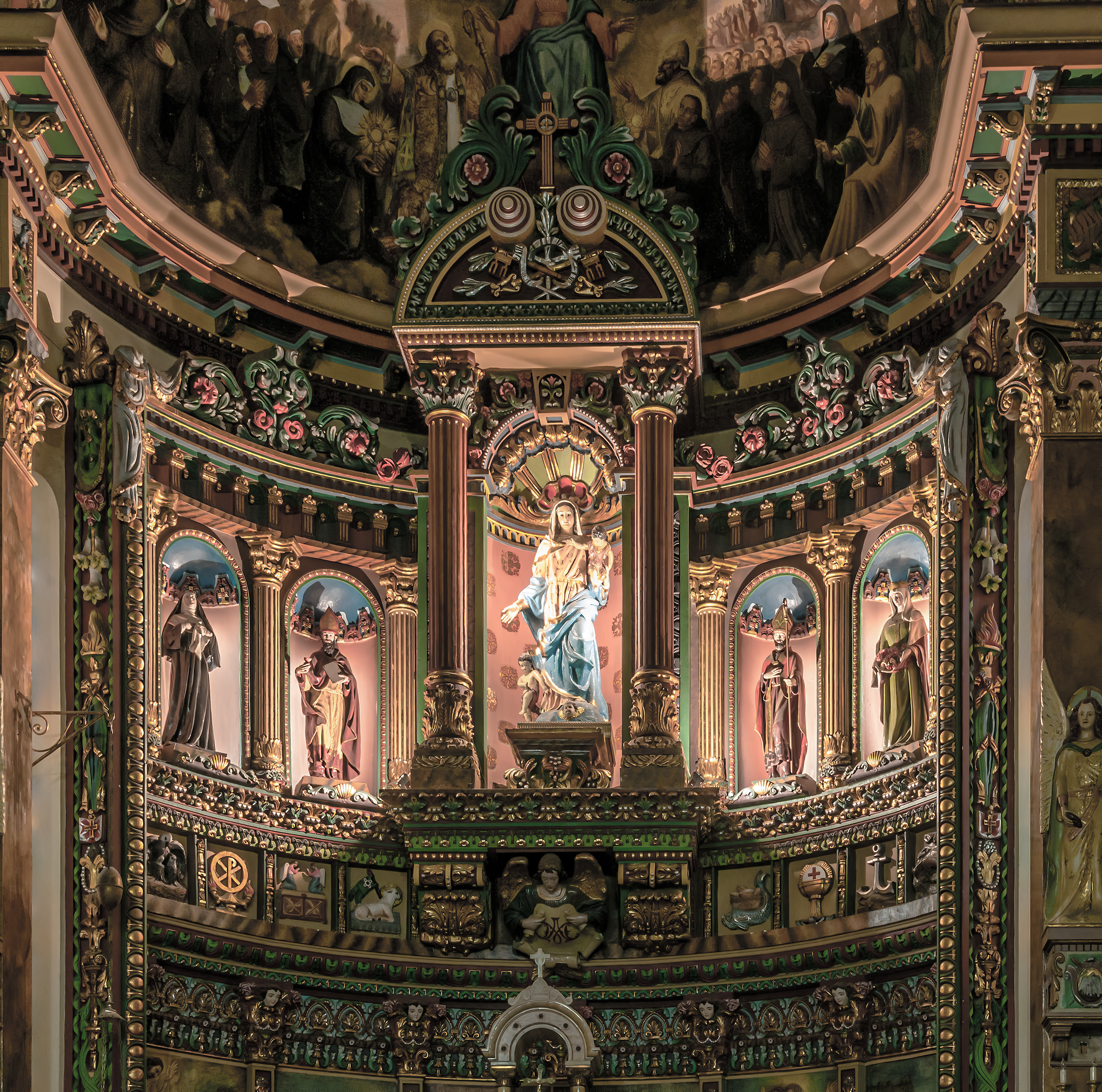
- Our Lady of Good Health Church
- Coordinates: 23°36′36″S 46°38′13″W
- Region: Southeast
- State: São Paulo
- Municipality: São Paulo
- Administrative Zone: South-Central
- Subprefecture: Vila Mariana

Government
  - Type: Subprefecture
  - Subprefect: Maurício de Oliveira Pinterich

Area
  - Total: 8.90 km^{2} (3.44 sq mi)

Population (2007)
  - Total: 130,780
  - Density: 14,694/km^{2} (38,060/sq mi)
- HDI: 0.942 – very high

Saúde is a district in the city of São Paulo, Brazil.

Saúde is a district in the South Zone of the city of São Paulo, included in the area of the Vila Mariana Subprefecture. The district is served by Line 1-Blue of the São Paulo Metro, with the stations Praça da Árvore, Saúde-Ultrafarma and São Judas.

== See also ==
- Subdivisions of São Paulo
