= Amdal =

Village in Sauda Municipality, Norway

- Village
- Interactive map of Amdal
- Coordinates: 59.6584°N 6.31743°E
- Country: Norway
- Region: Western Norway
- County: Rogaland
- District: Ryfylke
- Municipality: Sauda Municipality
- Elevation: 204 m (669 ft)
- Time zone: UTC+01:00 (CET)
  - Summer (DST): UTC+02:00 (CEST)
- Post Code: 4208 Saudasjøen

Amdal is a small farming village in Sauda Municipality in Rogaland county, Norway. The village is located just a short distance inland from the Saudafjorden, about 1.5 kilometres (0.93 mi) north of the village of Saudasjøen and about 2.5 kilometres (1.6 mi) west of the town of Sauda.
