= Saude =

Saude may refer to:

== Places ==
- Saude Municipality (Rogaland) (now spelled Sauda), a municipality in Rogaland county, Norway
- Saude Municipality (Telemark), a former municipality in Telemark county, Norway
- Saude, Iowa, an unincorporated community in Chickasaw County, Iowa, United States

== People ==
- Jean Saudé, a French printmaker in Paris, known for his mastery of the pochoir technique

== See also ==
- Saúde (disambiguation)
