= Rogalands Fremtid =

Norwegian newspaper

Rogalands Fremtid was a Norwegian newspaper, published in Sauda Municipality in Rogaland county.

== History and profile ==
Rogalands Fremtid was started in 1930 as the only Communist Party organ in the whole county. However, the party struggled economically and the newspaper went defunct after its last issue on 18 July 1931.
