= Saudasjøen Chapel =

Church in Rogaland, Norway

- Saudasjøen kapell
- Saudasjøen Chapel
- 59.640100°N 6.305548°E
- Location: Sauda Municipality, Rogaland
- Country: Norway
- Denomination: Church of Norway
- Churchmanship: Evangelical Lutheran

History
- Status: Chapel
- Founded: 1973
- Consecrated: 29 April 1973

Architecture
- Functional status: Active
- Architectural type: Long church
- Completed: 1973

Specifications
- Capacity: 260
- Materials: Concrete

Administration
- Diocese: Stavanger bispedømme
- Deanery: Ryfylke prosti
- Parish: Sauda

Saudasjøen Chapel (Norwegian: Saudasjøen kapell) is a chapel of the Church of Norway in Sauda Municipality in Rogaland county, Norway. It is located in the village of Saudasjøen. It is an annex chapel in the Sauda parish which is part of the Ryfylke prosti (deanery) in the Diocese of Stavanger. The concrete chapel was built in 1973. The chapel seats about 260 people.

== History ==
The first church in Saudashjøen was likely built in the 12th century. It was then known as the Sauda Church. The church stood there for centuries until the 1860s when it was decided to build a new Sauda Church in the nearby village of Sauda. The new church was completed there in 1866 and the old church was no longer used. In 1869, the old church was torn down and its materials were sold. The people of Saudasjøen were not very happy to lose their local church and almost immediately began working towards getting their own church once again. It was not until 1971, over 100 years later that the municipal council agreed to build a chapel in Saudasjøen. A lot of the work was done by the local villagers. The new chapel had a 22-by-82-metre (72 ft × 269 ft) nave. The new chapel was consecrated on 29 April 1973 by the Bishop Olav Hagesæther.

== See also ==
- List of churches in Rogaland
