= Saudefaldene =

Norwegian hydroelectric power company

Saudefaldene is a hydroelectric power company in Sauda Municipality, Norway.

It was founded in 1913 to harness hydropower in the Sauda Watershed. Building of power plants started in 1914, and power was delivered starting in 1919 (107 years ago). It was bought by Union Carbide in 1925. After the national escheat came into effect in 1979 both Saudefaldene and the production company Sauda Smelteverk were bought by Norwegian company Elkem.
