= Hellandsbygda =

Village in Sauda Municipality, Norway

Hellandsbygda Hellandsbygd
- Village
- Interactive map of Hellandsbygda
- Coordinates: 59.6905°N 6.51133°E
- Country: Norway
- Region: Western Norway
- County: Rogaland
- District: Ryfylke
- Municipality: Sauda Municipality
- Elevation: 265 m (869 ft)
- Time zone: UTC+01:00 (CET)
  - Summer (DST): UTC+02:00 (CEST)
- Post Code: 4200 Hellandsbygd

Hellandsbygda is a village in Sauda Municipality in Rogaland county, Norway. The village is located in a river valley about 12 kilometres (7.5 mi) northeast of the town of Sauda. The village is surrounded by forested mountains with the County Road 520 running through the village on its way from Sauda over the mountains to the Røldal area in neighboring Vestland county. The mountain Kyrkjenuten lies to the north of Hellandsbygda and the mountain Skaulen lies to the southeast of the village.

== History ==
Hellandsbygda was an important mining/industrial location. The nearby Allmannajuvet mine is now a museum of the areas mining history. Hellandsbygd has also been an important hydro-power producer. The Sauda I power plant was in use here from 1919–2008 and the Sauda IV power plant has been in use since 1968.
