= Sauda Skisenter =

Norwegian winter sports centre

Coordinates: 59°37′29″N 6°14′43″E

Sauda Skisenter is a winter sports centre located on a mountain above the village of Saudasjøen and about 5 kilometres (3.1 mi) from the town of Sauda in Sauda Municipality in Rogaland county, Norway.
