= Jabaquara =

Jabaquara may refer to:

- Subprefecture of Jabaquara, São Paulo
- Jabaquara (district of São Paulo)
- Jabaquara (São Paulo Metro)
- Jabaquara Intermunicipal Terminal, a bus terminal in São Paulo
- Jabaquara Atlético Clube, a football club based in Santos
