= Kyrkjenuten =

Mountain in Rogaland, Norway

Highest point
- Elevation: 1,602 m (5,256 ft)
- Prominence: 532 m (1,745 ft)
- Isolation: 20.8 km (12.9 mi) to Reinsnosi
- Coordinates: 59°47′40″N 6°32′58″E

Geography
- Location: Rogaland, Norway
- Parent range: Ryfylkesheiane

Kyrkjenuten is a mountain in Sauda Municipality in Rogaland county, Norway. The 1,602-metre (5,256 ft) tall mountain is the highest mountain in Sauda Municipality and also the 7th highest mountain in the county. It is located in northeastern Sauda, about 12 kilometres (7.5 mi) north of the village of Hellandsbygda and about the same distance southeast of the village of Fjæra in Etne Municipality to the north of the mountain, just over the Vestland county border.
