= Torfinn Opheim =

Norwegian politician (born 1961)

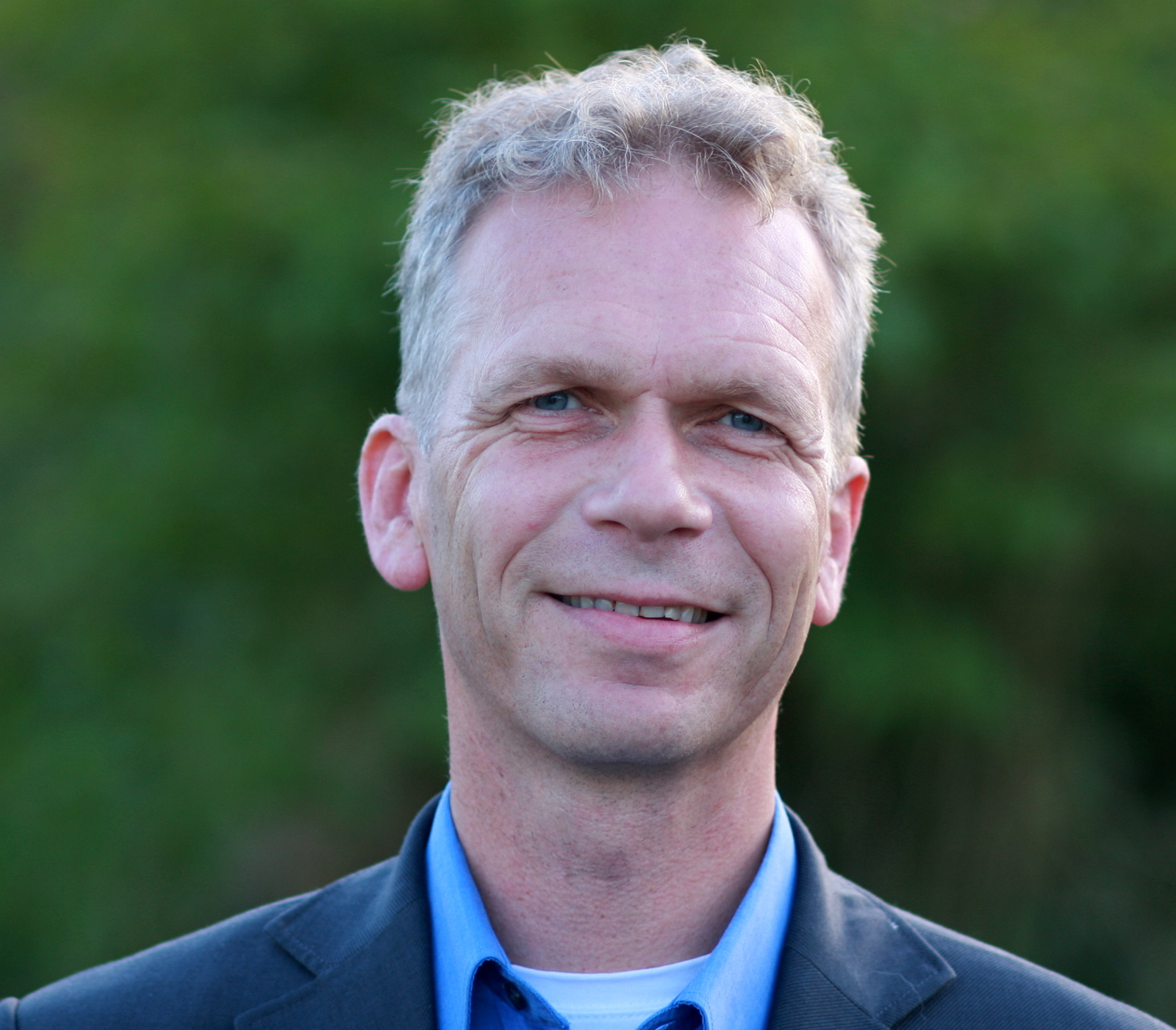
- Torfinn Opheim 2009
- Born: 12 April 1961 (age 65); Sauda Municipality, Norway
- Occupation: Politician for the Norwegian Labour Party

Torfinn Opheim (born 12 April 1961, in Sauda Municipality) is a Norwegian politician for the Labour Party.

He was elected to the Norwegian Parliament from Rogaland in 2005. He had previously served as a deputy representative during the term 2001–2005.

On the local level Opheim was a member of the municipal council of Sauda Municipality from 1987 to 2005, and he was mayor for the last six years of that period.
