= Skaulen =

Mountain in Rogaland, Norway

Highest point
- Elevation: 1,540 m (5,050 ft)
- Prominence: 619 m (2,031 ft)
- Isolation: 15.4 km (9.6 mi)
- Coordinates: 59°38′03″N 6°34′49″E

Geography
- Location: Rogaland, Norway
- Parent range: Ryfylkesheiane

Skaulen is a mountain in Rogaland county, Norway. The 1,540-metre (5,050 ft) mountain lies on the border of Sauda Municipality and Suldal Municipality. The mountain lies in the Ryfylkesheiane mountains, about 7.5 kilometres (4.7 mi) southeast of the village of Hellandsbygda in Sauda Municipality and about 13 kilometres (8.1 mi) west of the village of Nesflaten in Suldal Municipality.

== See also ==
- List of mountains of Norway
