= Subprefecture of Vila Mariana =

Coordinates: 23°31′S 46°36′W

- Subprefecture
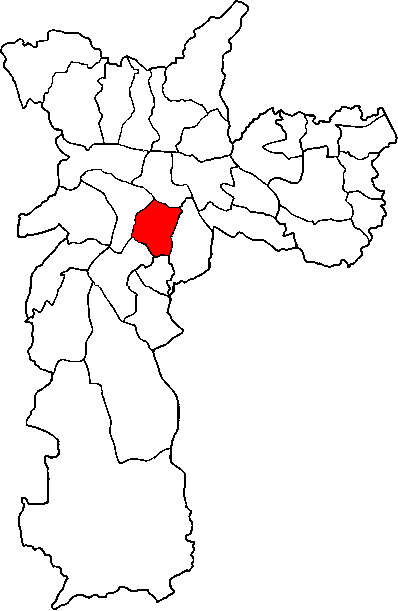
- Location of the Subprefecture of Vila Mariana in São Paulo

- Location of municipality of São Paulo within the State of São Paulo
- Country: Brazil
- Region: Southeast
- State: São Paulo
- Municipality: São Paulo
- Administrative Zone: South-Central
- Districts: Vila Mariana, Saúde, Moema

Government
  - Type: Subprefecture
  - Subprefect: Manoel Antônio da Silva Araujo

Area
  - Total: 26.87 km^{2} (10.37 sq mi)

Population (2008)
  - Total: 294,627
- HDI: 0.952 – very high
- Website: Subprefeitura Vila Mariana (Portuguese)

The Subprefecture of Vila Mariana is one of 32 subprefectures of the city of São Paulo, Brazil. It comprises three districts: Vila Mariana, Saúde, and Moema.

The Ibirapuera Park is located in this subprefecture, as well as the main campus of Federal University of São Paulo and the Brazilian headquarters of IBM.
