= Allmannajuvet =

Canyon in Rogaland, Norway

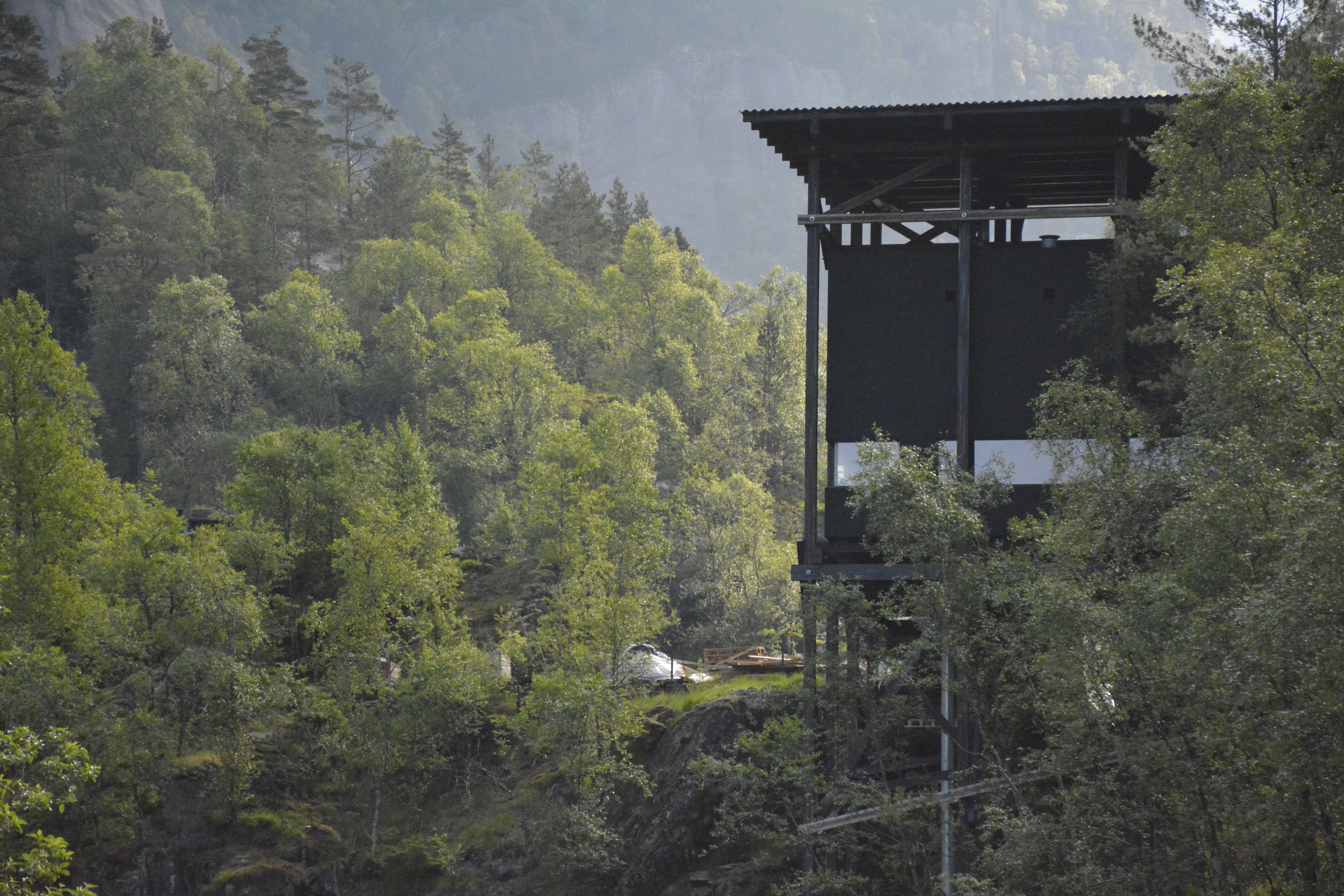
- Wooden structure for the museum of mining history in Allmannajuvet, designed by Peter Zumthor

Geology
- Type: River valley

Geography
- Location: Rogaland, Norway
- Coordinates: 59.6536°N 6.4668°E

Location
- Interactive map of Allmannajuvet

Allmannajuvet is a ravine or canyon located along the river Storelva in Sauda Municipality in Rogaland county, Norway. The ravine is located in a rural, forested area along the Norwegian County Road 520 between the town of Sauda and the village of Hellandsbygda.

== Mining ==
This was the site of a large zinc mine which began operations in 1881 and closed in 1899, due to the changing market prices of zinc and high extraction costs. At its peak, the mine had 160 employees and was a major part of zinc exports from Norway.

In 2002, Peter Zumthor was commissioned by the Norwegian road administration to design a rest area, museum and cafe. After a long period with planning and design changes, the construction started in 2008. It took 8 years before the project was finished, but in September 2016 the official opening was held. The museum is open for visitors in the summer time from June-August, and for groups ordering in advance the rest of the year. Three buildings are finished, and only the old path leading to the mines are yet to open. During a flood in 2014 parts of the path and a bridge were washed away, and work is now under way to repair the damage.

The former mine site is maintained as an annex of Ryfylke Museum.
