= Sauda Church =

Church in Rogaland, Norway

- Sauda kyrkje
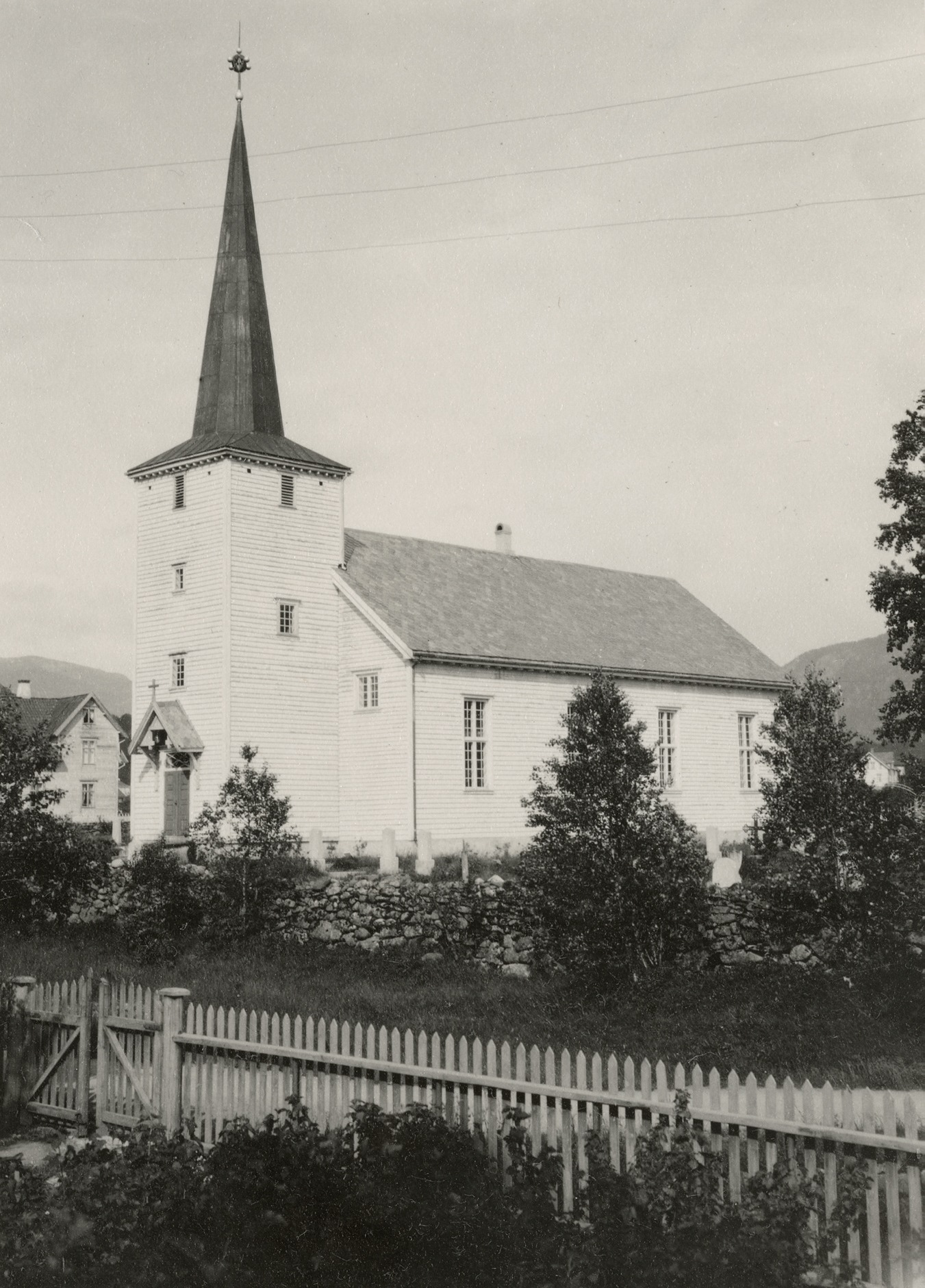
- View of the church in 1950
- Sauda Church
- 59.651796°N 6.354378°E
- Location: Sauda Municipality, Rogaland
- Country: Norway
- Denomination: Church of Norway
- Churchmanship: Evangelical Lutheran

History
- Status: Parish church
- Founded: 14th century
- Consecrated: 26 Sept 1866

Architecture
- Functional status: Active
- Architect: Hans Linstow
- Architectural type: Long church
- Completed: 1866

Specifications
- Capacity: 350
- Materials: Wood

Administration
- Diocese: Stavanger bispedømme
- Deanery: Ryfylke prosti
- Parish: Sauda
- Norwegian Cultural Heritage Site
- Type: Church
- Status: Not protected
- ID: 85401

Sauda Church (Norwegian: Sauda kyrkje) is a parish church of the Church of Norway in Sauda Municipality in Rogaland county, Norway. It is located in the town of Sauda. It is the main church for the Sauda parish which is part of the Ryfylke prosti (deanery) in the Diocese of Stavanger. The white, wooden church was built in a long church design in 1866 using designs by the famous architect Hans Linstow. The church seats about 350 people.

== History ==
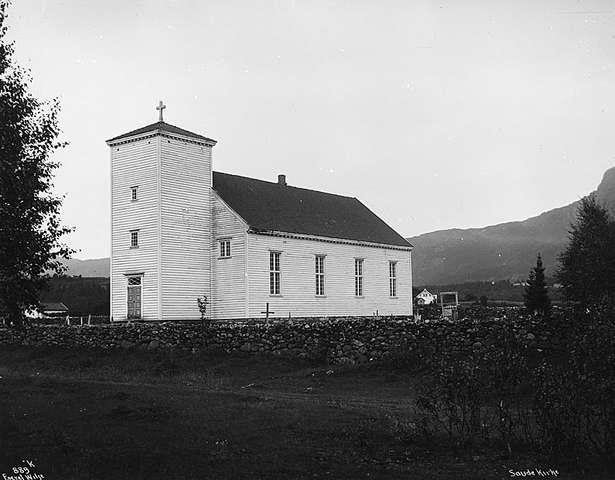
View of the church in 1913.

The earliest existing historical records of the church date back to the year 1467, but the church was not new that year. The first church was a stave church that was located in the village of Saudasjøen. In 1624, a new tower was added to the old church building. In the mid-1700s, the old church was in need of a renovation, so the old choir was torn down and rebuilt. In 1806, the church was again renovated. This time, the whole building except for the choir was torn down and rebuilt. After the renovation, nothing was left of the original medieval stave church.

In 1864, the parish decided to move the church site to the larger village of Sauda, about 3.5 kilometres (2.2 mi) to the northeast. The new church was completed in 1866 and it was consecrated on 26 September 1866 by the parish priest P. R. Hoffgaard on behalf of the Bishop Jacob von der Lippe. The old church was closed after the new church was completed and then in 1868, the old church was torn down and its materials were sold to some farms in Finnøy Municipality. The land where the old church once stood remains as a graveyard.

== See also ==
- List of churches in Rogaland
