= Subprefecture of Jabaquara =

Coordinates: 23°39′08″S 46°38′47″W

- Subprefecture
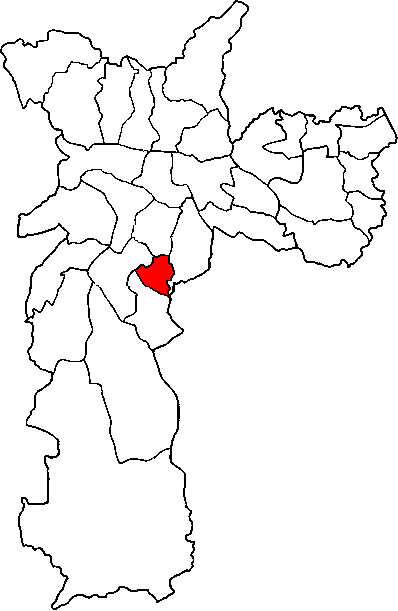
- Location of the Subprefecture of Jabaquara in São Paulo

- Location of municipality of São Paulo within the State of São Paulo
- Country: Brazil
- Region: Southeast
- State: São Paulo
- Municipality: São Paulo
- Administrative Zone: South-Central
- Districts: Jabaquara

Government
  - Type: Subprefecture
  - Subprefect: Roberto Campanha

Area
  - Total: 14.06 km^{2} (5.43 sq mi)

Population (2008)
  - Total: 213,862
- Website: Subprefeitura Jabaquara (Portuguese)

The Subprefecture of Jabaquara is one of 32 subprefectures of the city of São Paulo, Brazil. It comprises one district: Jabaquara.
