= Praça da Árvore (São Paulo Metro) =

São Paulo Metro station

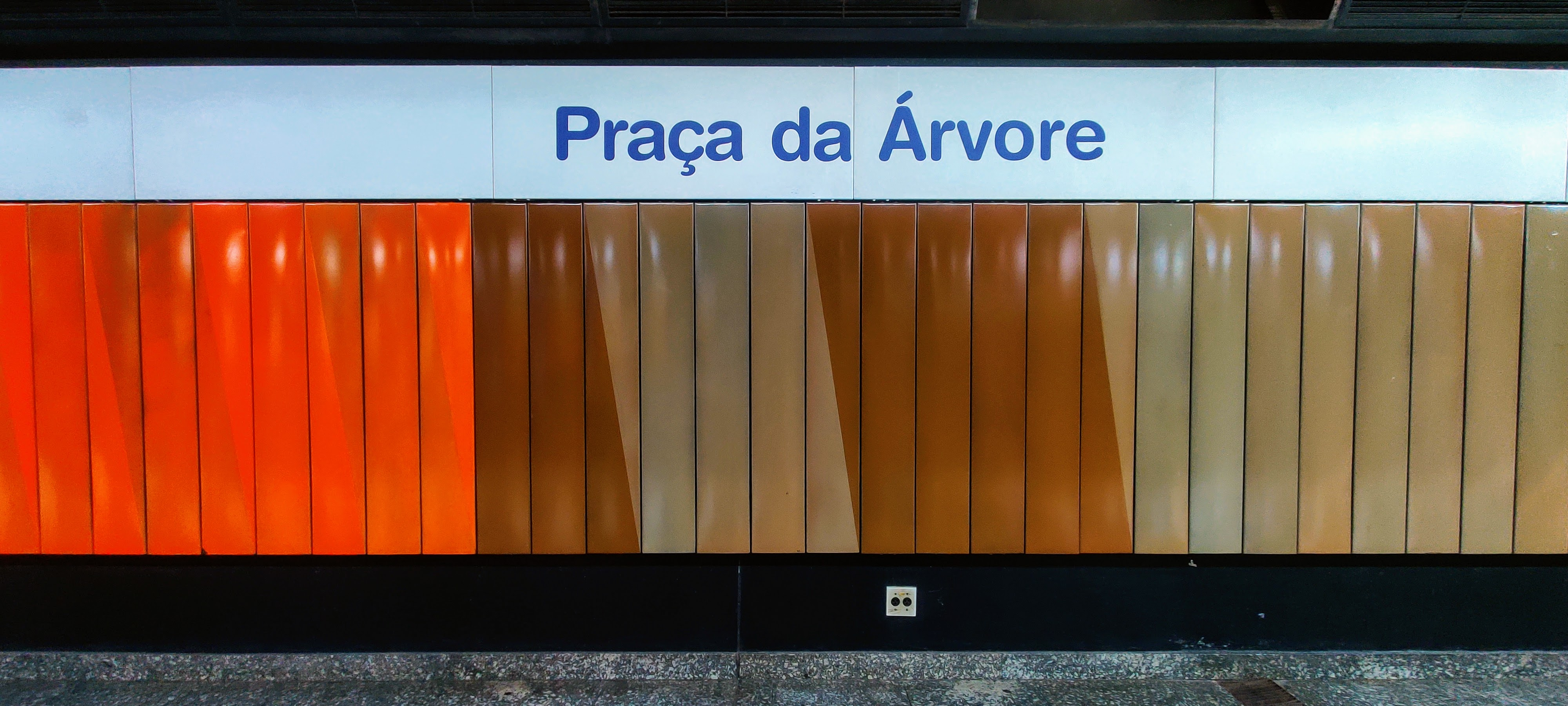

General information
- Location: 39 Praça da Árvore; São Paulo; Brazil
- Coordinates: 23.610576°S 46.637861°W
- Owner: Government of the State of São Paulo
- Operator: Companhia do Metropolitano de São Paulo
- Platforms: Side platforms
- Connections: SPTrans bus lines

Construction
- Structure type: Underground
- Accessible: y

Other information
- Station code: ARV

History
- Opened: September 14, 1974

Passengers
- 16,000/business day

Services
Preceding station	São Paulo Metro	Following station
Santa Cruz towards Tucuruvi	Line 1	Saúde towards Jabaquara
Track layout
Location

Praça da Árvore is a station on Line 1 (Blue) of the São Paulo Metro.

== SPTrans lines ==
The following SPTrans bus lines can be accessed. Passengers may use a Bilhete Único card for transfer:

Line #	Destination
4727/10	Jardim Clímax
707A/10	Jardim Ângela
