= South-Central Zone of São Paulo =

Coordinates: 23°35′53″S 46°39′13″W

South-Central Zone of São Paulo Zona Centro-Sul
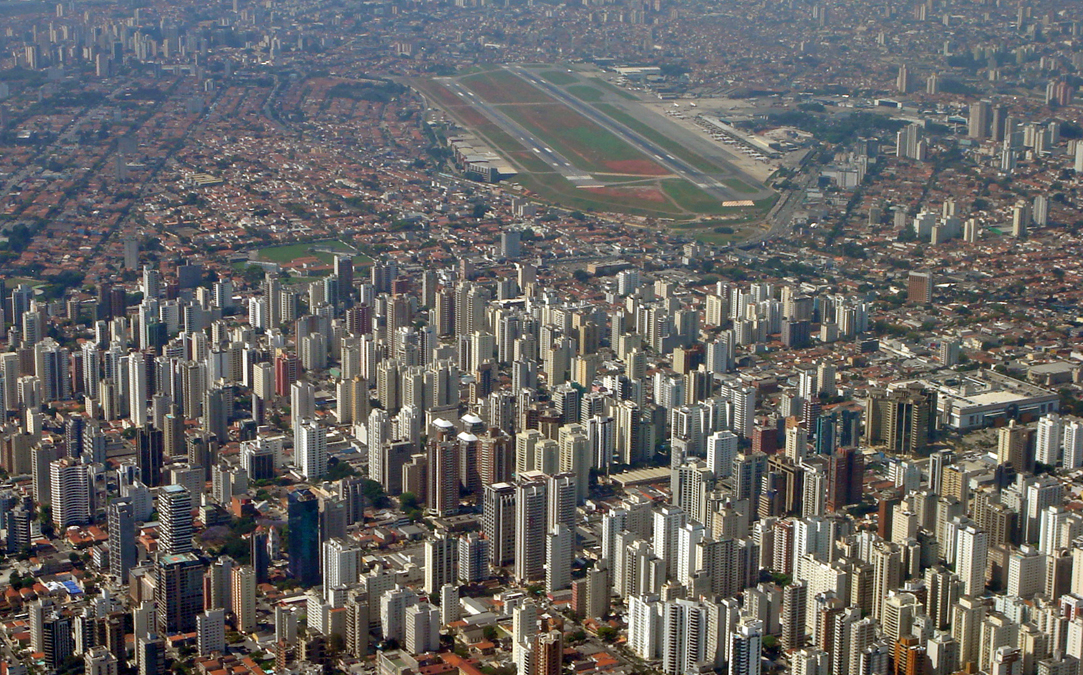

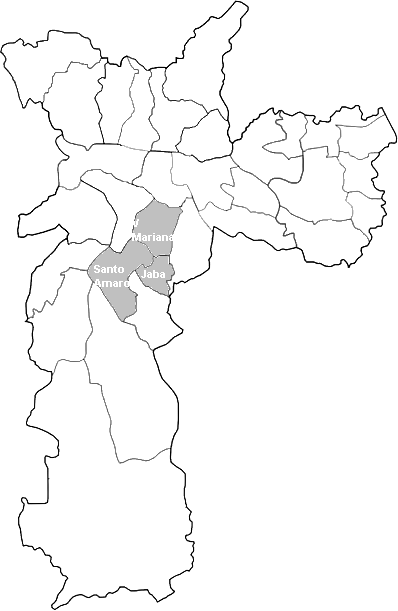
- Location of South-Central Zone of São Paulo
- Country: Brazil
- State: São Paulo
- City: São Paulo
- Subprefectures: South-Central Zone: Santo Amaro; Vila Mariana; Jabaquara

Population
  - Total: 731,758

The South-Central Zone is an Administrative Zone of São Paulo, Brazil. According to the 2010 census, it has a population of 731,758 inhabitants.

It is a region that is in constant development, with housing neighborhoods more valuable than in the city, such as Klabin, Vila Clementino, and Mirandópolis.

Locals refer to this region simply as South Zone.

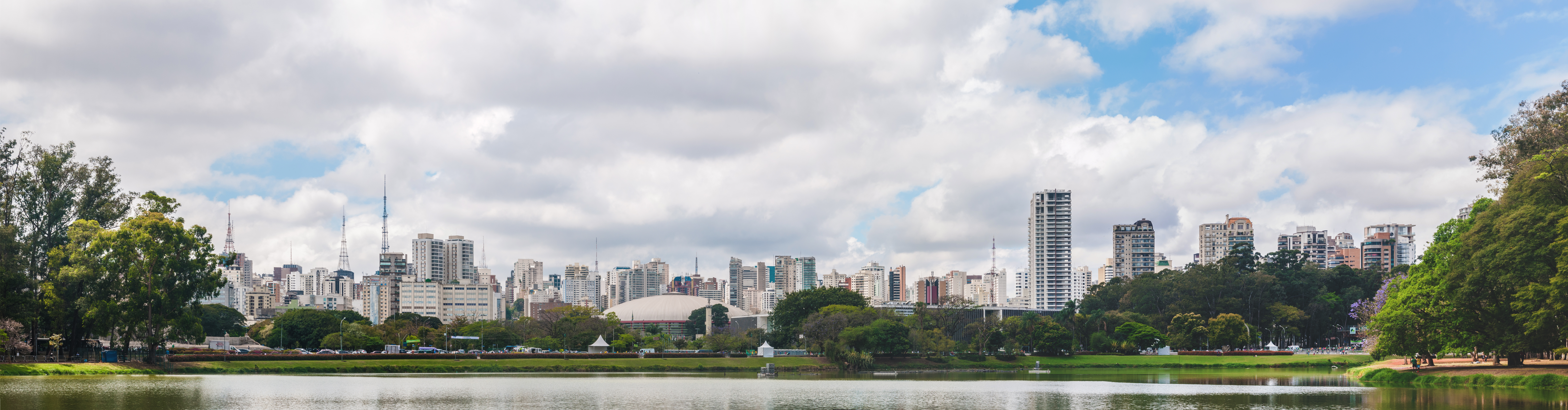
Panorama of the Moema district
