= TV Saúde =

- Country: Portugal
- Broadcast area: Portugal
- Headquarters: Coimbra

Programming
- Language(s): Portuguese

Ownership
- Owner: TV Medicina Gest (Bissaya Barreto Foundation)

History
- Launched: 10 June 2000
- Closed: 1 June 2004

TV Saúde, renamed Canal Saúde in 2004, was a Portuguese health television channel owned by the Bissaya Barreto Foundation, based and broadcasting from Coimbra. The channel timeshared with TV Medicina, a subscription channel limited to doctors.

== History ==
The channel was announced in December 1999, with a tentative launch date set for March 2000. This was later delayed, and in May 2000, it announced experimental broadcasts for May 22 and 23, and a launch date set for the period between June 10 and 15, in which both TV Saúde and its overnight counterpart TV Medicina would launch. The former would be aimed at TV Cabo's 2,5 million subscriber base, while the latter would be restricted to doctors with a TV Cabo subscription. In October, it was expected to become the first interactive channel in Portugal, when TV Cabo was set to begin rolling out its interactive service. In an initial phase, the channel would broadcast from 10am to 6pm, with four hours of new content a day, the remaining four hours would consist of repeats. Its programs were already defined: À mesa com saúde (eating, nutrition), Sinais, sintomas e doenças (how to detect or prevent common diseases), Observatório (studio-based debate program where the interviewees are patients and specialists in the psychological, social and technical aspects), Viver até aos 100! (health problems and wellbeing conditions among the elderly), E se eu vos contasse... (how patients were treated in the past), Tribuna do Jornalista and Tribuna do Jurista (both fortnightly programs which analyzed relevant topics) and Jornal da Saúde (weekly analysis of what happened in the health field shown on Fridays). Weekends consisted of repeats of key weekday programs.

In August 2001, the channel suspended production of programming until late October due to litigation with Publimondego, whose relations with TV Saúde deteriorated earlier in the year.

In May 2002, female staff of the channel received oral firing notification. Company administrator Luís Reis also announced the dissolution of the company. The staff did not receive formal letters as of July. Later that year, the channel aired Bem Estar, a weekly talk show airing on Thursdays. On April 15, 2003, a new talk show joined the schedule, Corpo e Alma, a program about "emotional, affective and mental" health, which marked the return of Cristina Caras Lindas to television.

At midnight on June 1, 2004, TV Cabo removed it and TV Medicina, citing a lack of contractual renewal.
