= Sauda Smelteverk =

Smelting plant in Sauda, Norway

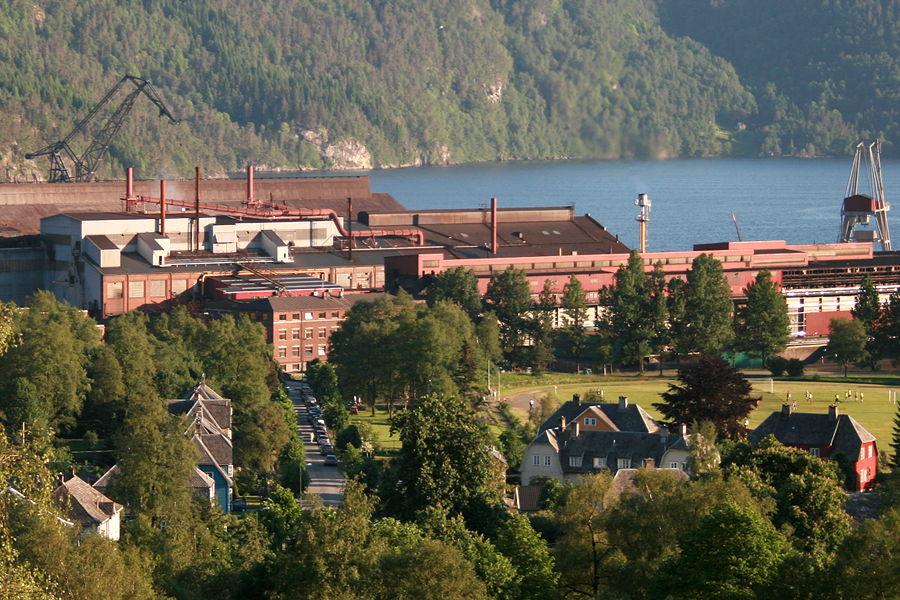

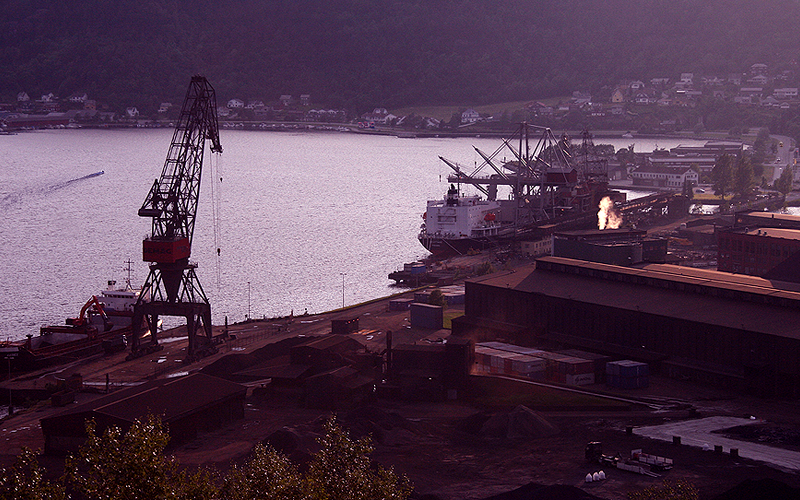

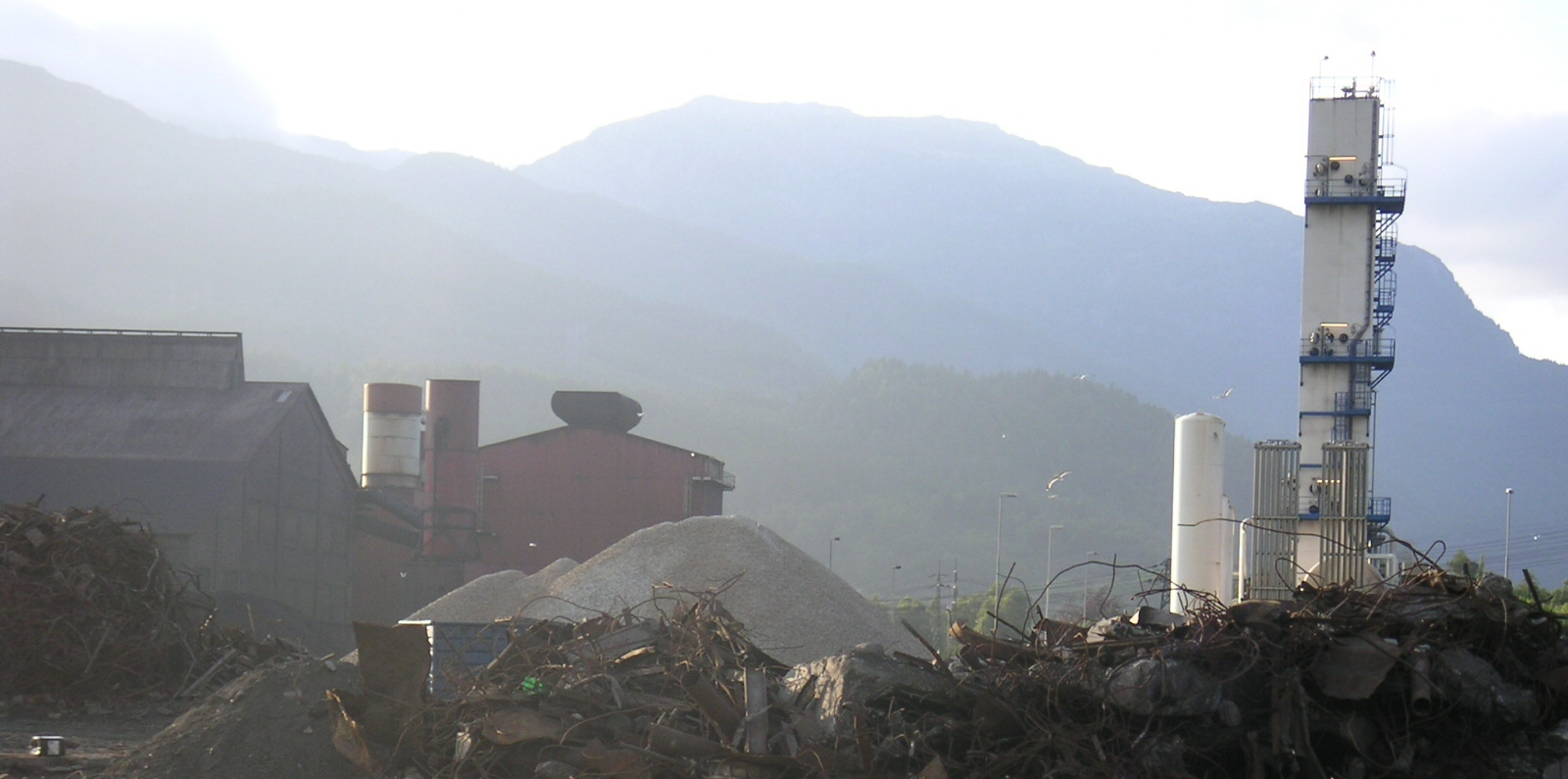

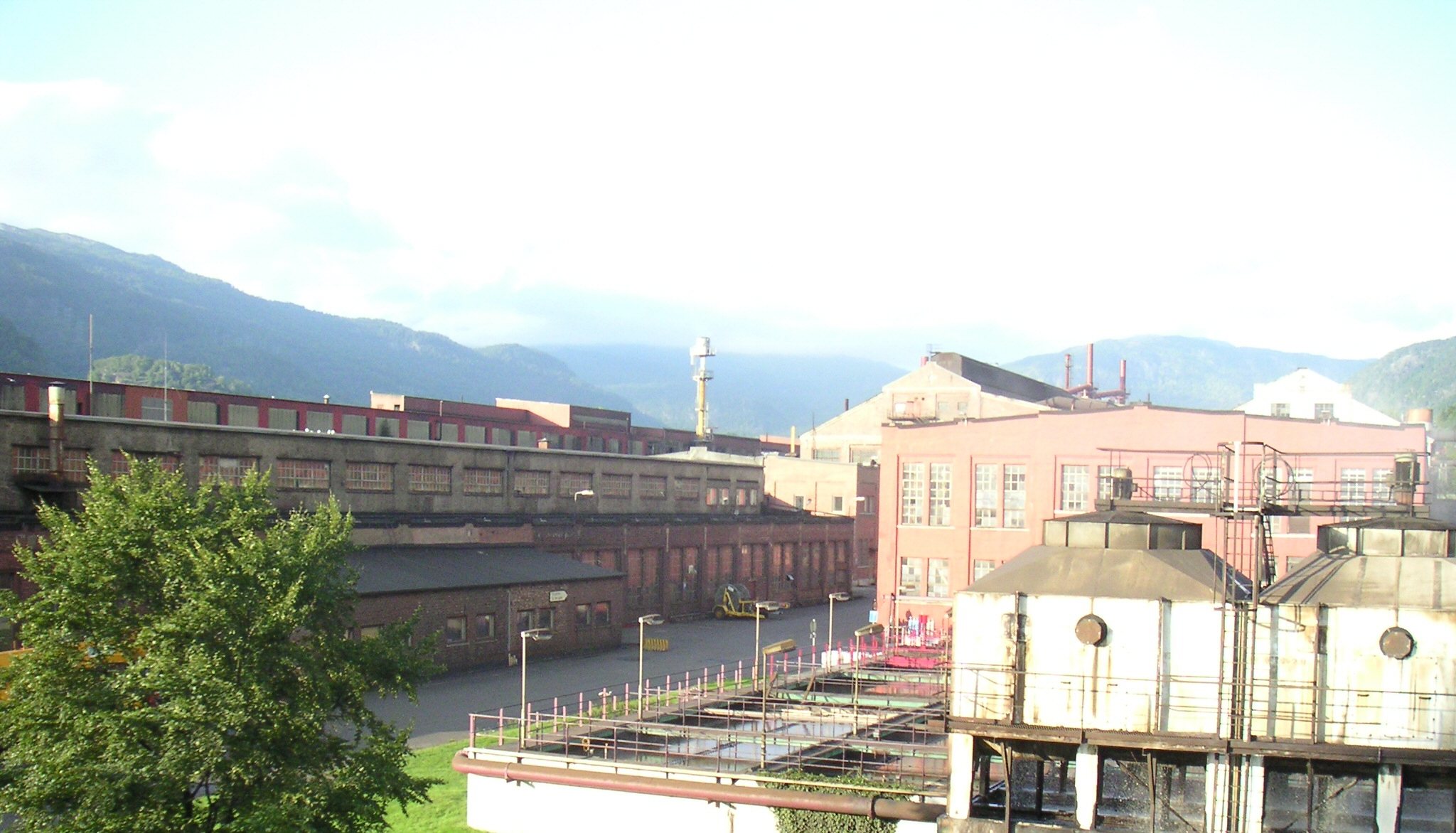

Sauda Smelteverk is a smelting plant located in the town of Sauda in Sauda Municipality in Rogaland county, Norway.

It was a plant for producing manganese alloys. It was founded in 1915, and the production was ready in 1923. Together with the hydropower deliverer company Saudefaldene it was owned by Union Carbide. It was named Electric Furnace Products Company until 1976. Sauda Smelteverk was bought by Norwegian corporation Elkem in 1981 and French corporation Eramet in 1999.

The plant was the site of the Sauda Strike in 1970.
