= Saúde (São Paulo Metro) =

São Paulo Metro station

Saúde–Ultrafarma
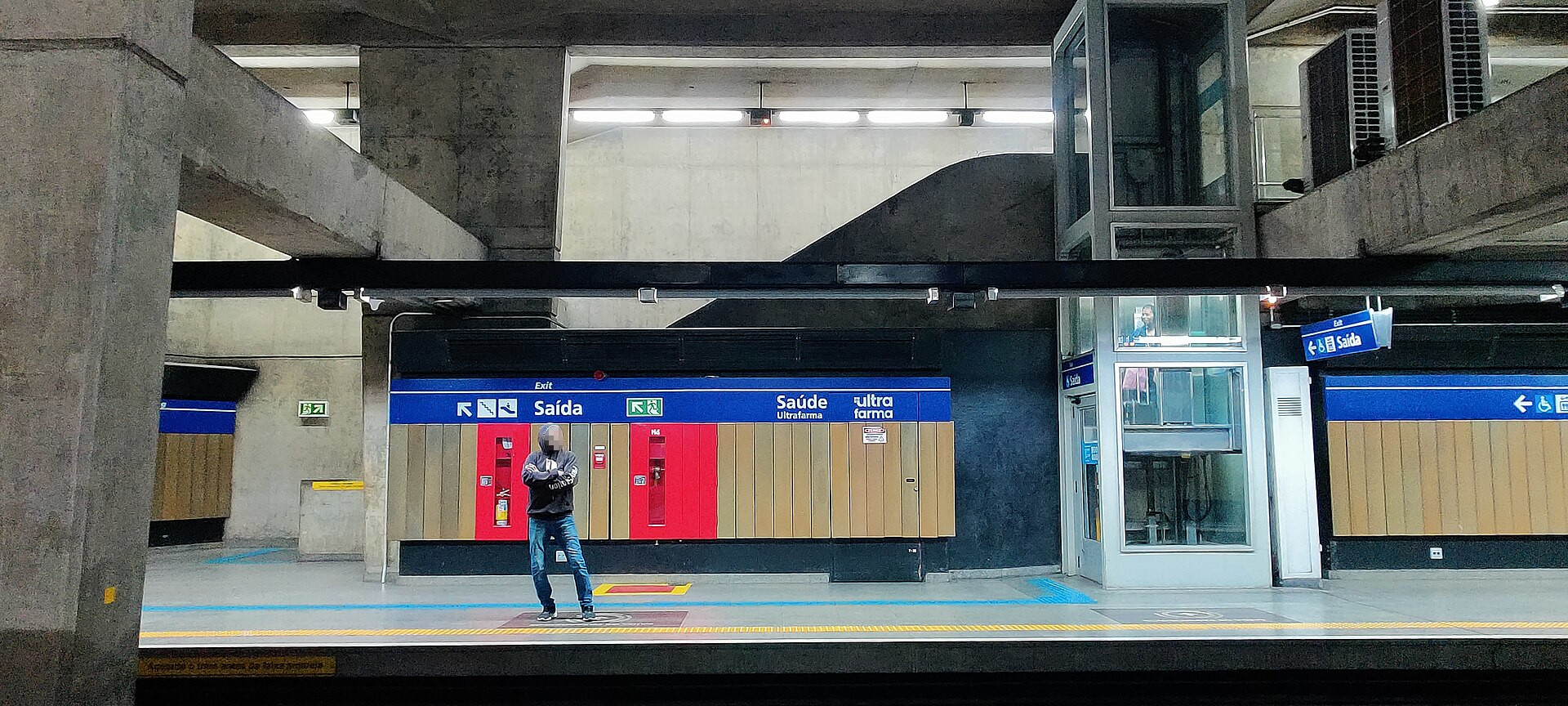

General information
- Location: 1634 Avenida Jabaquara; São Paulo; Brazil
- Coordinates: 23.619133°S 46.639345°W
- Owner: Government of the State of São Paulo
- Operator: Companhia do Metropolitano de São Paulo
- Platforms: Side platforms
- Connections: SPTrans bus lines

Construction
- Structure type: Underground
- Accessible: y

Other information
- Station code: SAU

History
- Opened: September 14, 1974

Passengers
- 27,000/business day

Services
Preceding station	São Paulo Metro	Following station
Praça da Árvore towards Tucuruvi	Line 1	São Judas towards Jabaquara
Future services
Indianópolis towards Santa Marina	Line 20 (proposed)	Abraão de Morais towards Pref. Celso Daniel-Santo André
Track layout
Location

Saúde, also known as Saúde–Ultrafarma for sponsorship reasons, is a station on Line 1 (Blue) of the São Paulo Metro.

== SPTrans lines ==
The following SPTrans bus lines can be accessed. Passengers may use a Bilhete Único card for transfer:

Line #	Destination
4732/10	Vila Liviero
4732/41	Vila Liviero
4734/10	Vila Moraes
4734/21	Vila Moraes
