= Saudasjøen =

Village in Sauda Municipality, Norway

- Village
- Interactive map of Saudasjøen
- Coordinates: 59.63967°N 6.30896°E
- Country: Norway
- Region: Western Norway
- County: Rogaland
- District: Ryfylke
- Municipality: Sauda Municipality
- Elevation: 1 m (3.3 ft)
- Time zone: UTC+01:00 (CET)
  - Summer (DST): UTC+02:00 (CEST)
- Post Code: 4208 Saudasjøen

Saudasjøen is a village in Sauda Municipality in Rogaland county, Norway. The village is located along the northern coast of the Saudafjorden about 3.5 kilometres (2.2 mi) southwest of the town of Sauda. For statistical purposes it is considered a part of the urban area of the town of Sauda. The village is mostly a bedroom community for the nearby town of Sauda. There are some small industries in Saudasjøen as well as the Saudasjøen Chapel. County Road 520 runs through the village along the shore of the fjord.

== History ==
Historically, Saudasjøen arose as a seaside resort near the small farm of Sauda and it became industrialized in the 1800s. The municipality was incorporated in 1838 and the village of Saudasjøen became its administrative centre (a position it held until the early 1900s when it was moved to Sauda. The small village is an important industrial location, especially in the field of metallurgy. Merchants settled around the quay at the old seaside resort and there were also a number of hotels and cafes in the area including the Sauda Fjordhotel and the Sauda Skisenter. The municipal high school was located here until 1989.

During World War II there was built a large aluminum plant at Nesøyra but production was moved to Årdal Municipality in 1947. The glass production factory Si-Glass was also located at Nesøyra. Saudasjøen is the site of the cemetery with Russian graves from World War II.
