= Sauda (town) =

Town in Rogaland, Norway

- Town/City
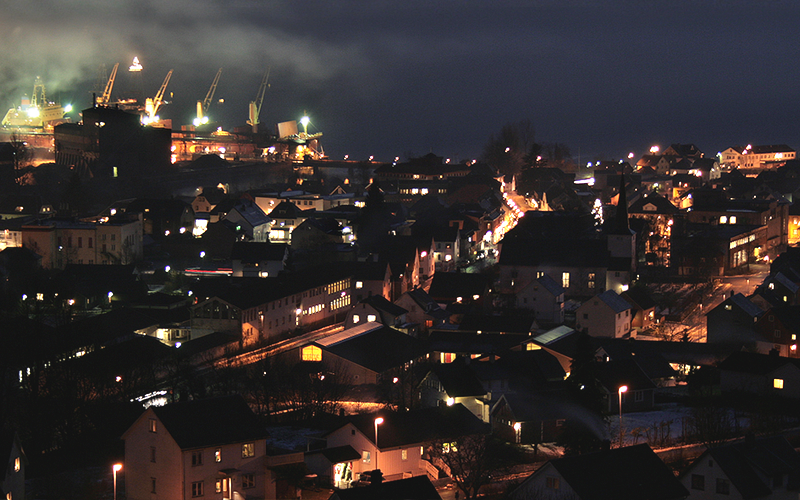
- View of the town at night (looking towards the fjord)
- Interactive map of Sauda
- Coordinates: 59.65059°N 6.35416°E
- Country: Norway
- Region: Western Norway
- County: Rogaland
- District: Ryfylke
- Municipality: Sauda Municipality
- Established as
- Town (By): 1999

Area
  - Total: 4.07 km^{2} (1.57 sq mi)
- Elevation: 7 m (23 ft)

Population (2025)
  - Total: 4,227
  - Density: 1,039/km^{2} (2,690/sq mi)
- Demonym: saudabu
- Time zone: UTC+01:00 (CET)
  - Summer (DST): UTC+02:00 (CEST)
- Post Code: 4200 Sauda

Sauda is a town in Sauda Municipality in Rogaland county, Norway. The town, which is also the administrative centre of the municipality, is located in a river valley at the northern end of the Saudafjorden. The small suburb of Saudasjøen lies about 3 kilometres (1.9 mi) west of the town centre. A large part of the industrial harbour area of Sauda is built on reclaimed land that was once underwater in the fjord.

Sauda received city status in 1998. The 4.07-square-kilometre (1,010-acre) town has a population (2025) of 4,227 and a population density of 1,039 inhabitants per square kilometre (2,690/sq mi). Sauda is the largest settlement in the municipality as well as the only urban area.

The newspaper Ryfylke has been published in Sauda since 1926.

The town has three churches: Sauda Church and Solbrekk Chapel in the town centre, and Saudasjøen Chapel in the western suburb of Saudasjøen. The Hellandsbygd Chapel is located in the valley about 15 kilometres (9.3 mi) to the northeast of the town. There is also a high school in the town as well as the Ryfylkesmuseet (Ryfylke museum).

== History ==
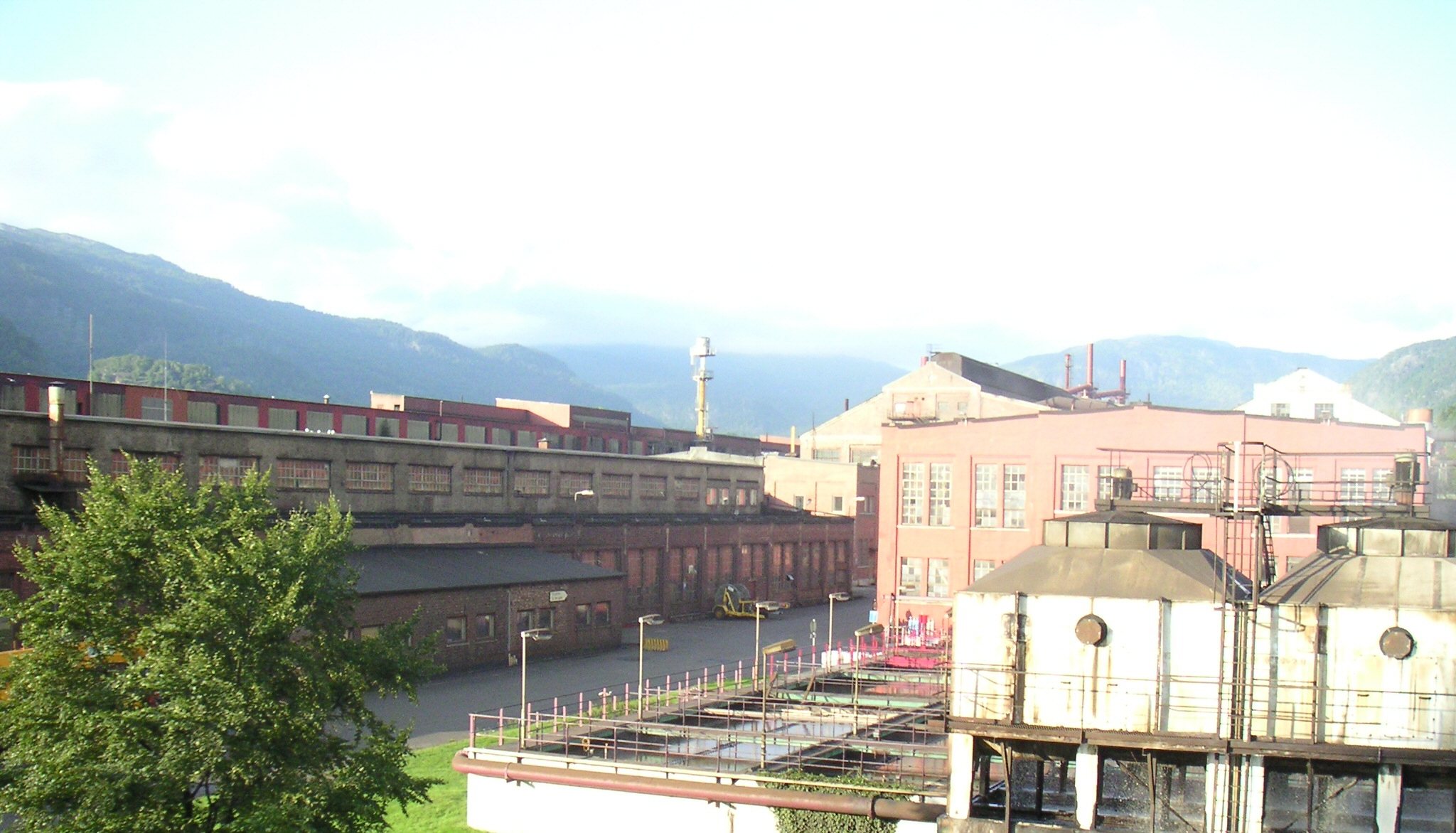
View of the Sauda Smeltverk

Sauda was originally (as with many Norwegian towns/cities) an old farming village. The village survived on agriculture and the timber industry throughout the Middle Ages. Due to its proximity to many nearby waterfalls, several mills were built for pulp and paper. Over time, Sauda grew up as industrialization began, especially at the start of the 1900s. Zinc mining in the late 1800s at the nearby Allmannajuvet mine caused Sauda's harbor to grow as the mining ships began arriving.

In 1915, the American company Union Carbide Corporation built the Sauda Smelteverk, a smelting factory near the centre of Sauda. This factory led directly or indirectly to a huge development in the area. Sauda suddenly became the place people both from Rogaland county and the rest of the country moved to in order to gain employment. It was a tripling in population into a few years, with a population peak around the year 1960. Recent industry and several power development project kept alive the city and made more development. The village received town status in 1998.

== Climate ==
Sauda has something in between a humid continental climate (Dfb) and a temperate oceanic climate (Cfb). The wettest part of the year is late autumn and winter and the driest is spring and early summer, which demonstrates an oceanic precipitation pattern. December precipitation is almost three times larger than in May. Situated at the innermost part of the long and narrow fjord of Sauda, the oceanic influences are less than in Stavanger, but still enough to moderate winters. Atlantic lows coming from the west goes up against the mountains surrounding Sauda and the result is a large amount of precipitation. The weather station in Sauda has been operating since March 1928. The all-time high temperature 34.6 °C (94.3 °F) was recorded July 2019, and the record low −17.2 °C (1.0 °F) was set in January 2010 (extremes available back to 2003).The average date for the first overnight freeze (below 0 °C (32 °F)) in autumn is October 15 (1981-2010 average).

Climate data for Sauda 1991-2020 (5 m, extremes 2003-2024)
Month	Jan	Feb	Mar	Apr	May	Jun	Jul	Aug	Sep	Oct	Nov	Dec	Year
Record high °C (°F)	10.4 (50.7)	11.4 (52.5)	17.1 (62.8)	20.9 (69.6)	31.3 (88.3)	30.9 (87.6)	34.6 (94.3)	31.6 (88.9)	30.5 (86.9)	22.9 (73.2)	17.4 (63.3)	13.8 (56.8)	34.6 (94.3)
Mean daily maximum °C (°F)	2.7 (36.9)	3.1 (37.6)	6 (43)	11 (52)	15.5 (59.9)	18.6 (65.5)	20.4 (68.7)	19.8 (67.6)	16 (61)	10.6 (51.1)	6.1 (43.0)	3.3 (37.9)	11.1 (52.0)
Daily mean °C (°F)	−0.2 (31.6)	−0.2 (31.6)	2.3 (36.1)	6.3 (43.3)	10.3 (50.5)	13.5 (56.3)	15.6 (60.1)	15.1 (59.2)	12 (54)	7.2 (45.0)	3.2 (37.8)	0.4 (32.7)	7.1 (44.9)
Mean daily minimum °C (°F)	−2.4 (27.7)	−2.7 (27.1)	−0.7 (30.7)	2.6 (36.7)	6 (43)	9.6 (49.3)	12.1 (53.8)	11.8 (53.2)	9 (48)	4.7 (40.5)	1 (34)	−1.8 (28.8)	4.1 (39.4)
Record low °C (°F)	−17.2 (1.0)	−14.4 (6.1)	−14.3 (6.3)	−6.4 (20.5)	−0.9 (30.4)	1.9 (35.4)	5.5 (41.9)	5.4 (41.7)	0.9 (33.6)	−5.3 (22.5)	−10.7 (12.7)	−15.7 (3.7)	−17.2 (1.0)
Average precipitation mm (inches)	283.7 (11.17)	222.3 (8.75)	189.5 (7.46)	120 (4.7)	104.3 (4.11)	106.5 (4.19)	117.3 (4.62)	173.8 (6.84)	218.9 (8.62)	264.7 (10.42)	269.9 (10.63)	300.3 (11.82)	2,371.2 (93.33)
Average precipitation days (≥ 1.0 mm)	19	17	17	14	13	13	15	16	16	17	19	20	196
Source 1: eklima/met.no
Source 2: NOAA - WMO averages 91-2020 Norway

== See also ==
- List of towns and cities in Norway
