= Sauda Municipality =

Municipality in Rogaland, Norway

Sauda Municipality Sauda kommune
- Municipality
- Saude herred (historic name); Søvde herred (historic name)
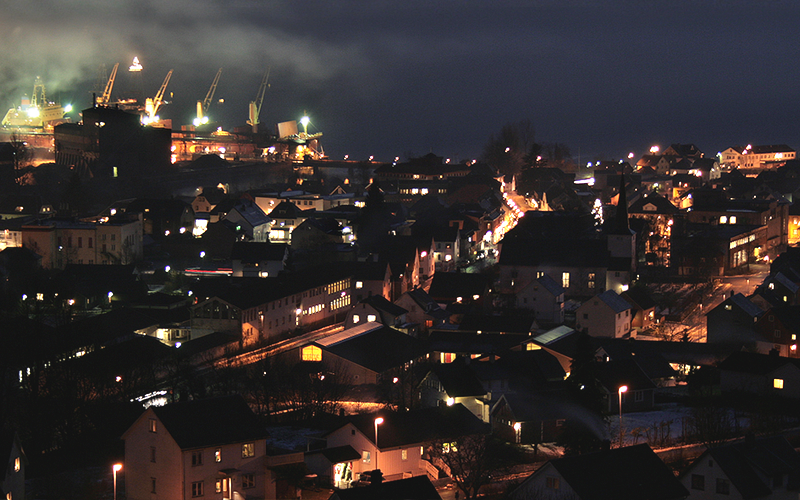
- View of the town of Sauda at night

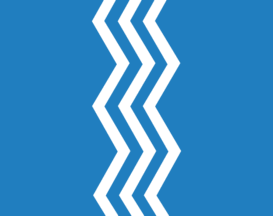
- Flag Coat of arms

- Rogaland within Norway

- Sauda within Rogaland
- Coordinates: 59°41′15″N 06°26′14″E
- Country: Norway
- County: Rogaland
- District: Ryfylke
- Established: 1842
  - Preceded by: Suldal Municipality
- Administrative centre: Sauda

Government
  - Mayor (2023): Håvard Handeland (Ap)

Area
  - Total: 546.56 km^{2} (211.03 sq mi)
  - Land: 507.51 km^{2} (195.95 sq mi)
  - Water: 39.05 km^{2} (15.08 sq mi) 7.1%
  - Rank: #196 in Norway
- Highest elevation: 1,602 m (5,256 ft)

Population (2026)
  - Total: 4,603
  - Rank: #190 in Norway
  - Density: 8.4/km^{2} (22/sq mi)
  - Change (10 years): ▼ −2.3%
- Demonym: Saudabu

Official language
  - Norwegian form: Nynorsk
- Time zone: UTC+01:00 (CET)
  - Summer (DST): UTC+02:00 (CEST)
- ISO 3166 code: NO-1135
- Website: Official website

Sauda is a municipality in Rogaland county, Norway. The administrative centre of the municipality is the city of Sauda, where most of the population lives. Other villages in the municipality include Saudasjøen and Amdal. Despite being in the northern part of the region of Ryfylke, Sauda participates in the Haugalandet Council and is under the jurisdiction of the Haugaland og Sunnhordland District Court.

The 546.56-square-kilometre (211.03 sq mi) municipality is the 196th largest by area out of the 357 municipalities in Norway. Sauda Municipality is the 190th most populous municipality in Norway with a population of 4,603. The municipality's population density is 8.4 inhabitants per square kilometre (22/sq mi) and its population has decreased by 2.3% over the previous 10-year period.

The city of Sauda is the fifth largest city in Rogaland county with 4,227 inhabitants (2025), and the city center is home to Northern Europe's largest smelting plant, Eramet Norway AS. The municipality is situated in the mountain valleys surrounding the Saudafjorden.

== General information ==
Part of the inner seaport in the town of Sauda

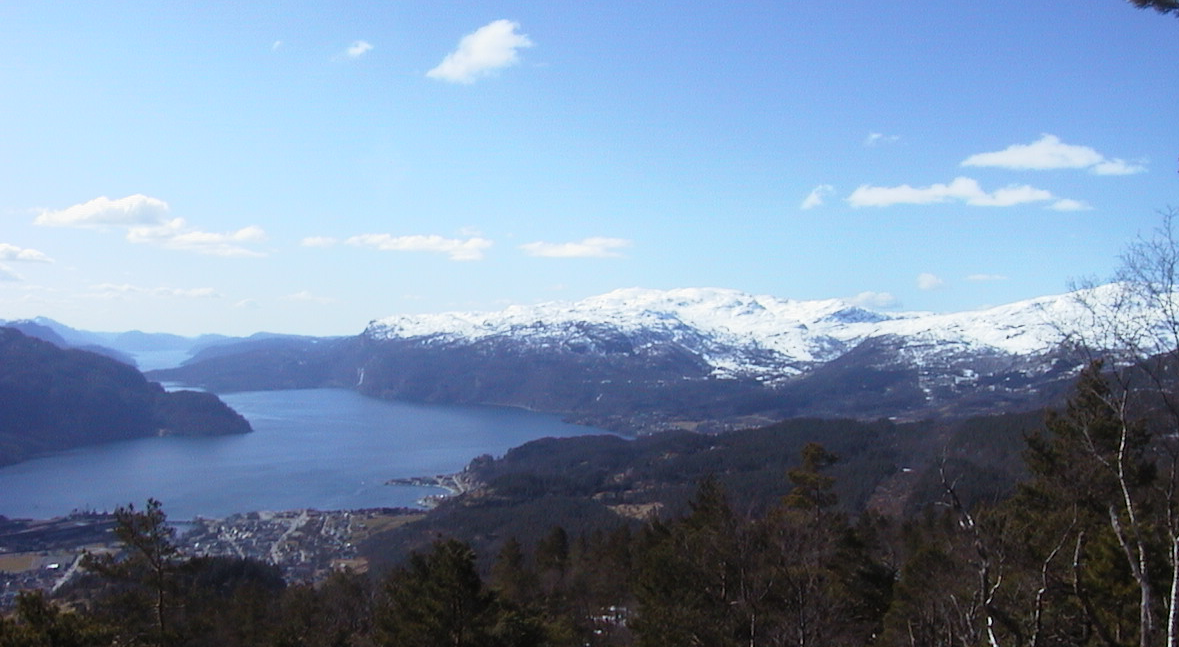
View of the narrow Sauda fjord

The municipality of Sauda was established in 1842 when it was separated from the large Suldal Municipality. Initially, Sauda had a population of 1,584. The municipal boundaries have never changed. The municipality declared the urban area of Sauda as a city in 1999.

=== Name ===
The municipality (originally the parish) is named after the old Sauda farm (Old Norse: Sauðar) since the first Sauda Church was built there. The farm is now part of the village of Saudasjøen. The name seems to come from the word sauðr which means "sheep", however, the same word is also the singular past indicative of the verb sjóða which means "to seethe" or "to boil", possibly referring to a spring of water.

Historically, the name of the municipality was spelled Søvde or Saude. On 3 November 1917, a royal resolution established the spelling of the name as Sauda Municipality.

=== Coat of arms ===
The coat of arms was granted on 14 May 1976. The official blazon is "Azure, three pallets dancetty argent" (Norwegian: I blått en vertical sølv trillingstreng med bredtannet snitt). This means the arms have a blue field (background) and the charge is a set of three, vertical, jagged lines. The charge has a tincture of argent which means it is commonly colored white, but if it is made out of metal, then silver is used. The jagged lines symbolically represent a river as a means for hydroelectricity (they can also be seen as "electrical sparks"). Historically, power was generated by watermills, providing a possibility for the development of an industry in the village. Presently, the power is used for melting metal ore in smelters in the municipality. The arms were designed by Johan Matland. The municipal flag has the same design as the coat of arms.

=== Churches ===
The Church of Norway has one parish (sokn) within Sauda Municipality. It is part of the Ryfylke prosti (deanery) in the Diocese of Stavanger.

Churches in Sauda Municipality
Parish (sokn)	Church name	Location of the church	Year built
Sauda	Sauda Church	Sauda	1866
Sauda	Saudasjøen Chapel	Saudasjøen	1973
Sauda	Hellandsbygd Chapel	Hellandsbygda	1956
Sauda	Solbrekk Chapel	Sauda	1958

== History ==
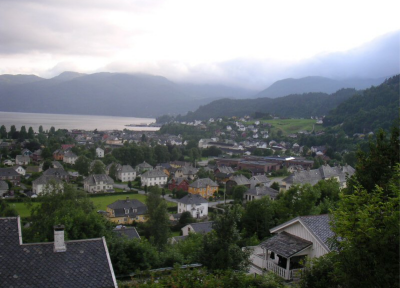
The Workers township, Åbøbyen 2005.

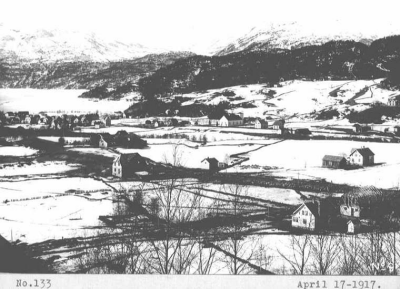
Before The Workers township was built, Åbøbyen 1917.

Archaeological excavation in Saudasjøen shows that people have been living in Sauda since the latest Ice Age. In 1349, the Plague/Black Death wiped out about two-thirds of the population in Sauda, causing a decline in both population and economy. Despite this, the population was increasing during the medieval period, and a new type of industry started to grow. Along the fjord, the power from several waterfalls was used to build and run sawmills, and large-scale lumber production was started. People from all over the world, especially from the Netherlands, started to trade with the people of Sauda. This resulted in major ship traffic, giving impetus to further development of the villages and farms in Sauda.

By the end of the 19th century, a new type of adventure would change the lives of the inhabitants forever. The mining industry started in the mountains of Hellandsbygda, making Sauda a small industrial area and trading center for the surrounding region. In 1910, the American company Electric Furnace Company (EFP) began the construction of Europe's largest smelting plant in Sauda. This could only be done because of the large number of waterfalls and rivers that made it possible to build power plants situated a short distance from the smelter, which uses large amounts of electricity.

Sauda's time as a farming village was now over, and the people of today still live on the foundation of the new city that emerged. By the end of World War II, the Germans had finished building a large Aluminum Melting Plant in Saudasjøen, but the production was moved to Årdal Municipality in 1946. The remaining buildings were demolished by the municipality in the 1950s, leaving the industrial area in Saudasjøen empty for decades. In the 1980s, a glass production factory was established together with a couple of mechanic production factories. The population of Sauda reached its peak in the mid-1960s, approximately 6,700 inhabitants. In 1998, the urban area of Sauda was declared to be a city (mostly a symbolic name, with no new municipal authority).

== Geography ==
Sauda Municipality is located in the valleys and mountains surrounding the Saudafjorden. Outside of the main valley, most of the municipality is very mountainous terrain, with mountains like Skaulen (1,560 metres or 5,120 feet) and Kyrkjenuten (1,602 metres or 5,256 feet). Kyrkjenuten is the highest point in the municipality. The town of Sauda is located about two hours by boat from the city of Stavanger, about four hours by car from the city of Bergen, and about six hours by car from the national capital, Oslo. The mountains surrounding the village of Saudasjøen contain one of the biggest ski resorts on the west coast of Norway. The town of Sauda is located on flat land, a delta created by the rivers that empty into the fjord just outside the town centre.

== Climate ==
Sauda has something in between a humid continental climate (Dfb) and a temperate oceanic climate (Cfb). The wettest part of the year is late autumn and winter and the driest is spring and early summer, which demonstrates an oceanic precipitation pattern. December precipitation is almost three times larger than in May. Situated at the innermost part of the long and narrow fjord of Sauda, the oceanic influences are less than in Stavanger, but still enough to moderate winters. Atlantic lows coming from the west goes up against the mountains surrounding Sauda and the result is a large amount of precipitation. The weather station in Sauda has been operating since March 1928. The all-time high temperature 34.6 °C (94.3 °F) was recorded July 2019, and the record low −17.2 °C (1.0 °F) was set in January 2010 (extremes available back to 2003).The average date for the first overnight freeze (below 0 °C (32 °F)) in autumn is October 15 (1981-2010 average).

Climate data for Sauda 1991-2020 (5 m, extremes 2003-2024)
Month	Jan	Feb	Mar	Apr	May	Jun	Jul	Aug	Sep	Oct	Nov	Dec	Year
Record high °C (°F)	10.4 (50.7)	11.4 (52.5)	17.1 (62.8)	20.9 (69.6)	31.3 (88.3)	30.9 (87.6)	34.6 (94.3)	31.6 (88.9)	30.5 (86.9)	22.9 (73.2)	17.4 (63.3)	13.8 (56.8)	34.6 (94.3)
Mean daily maximum °C (°F)	2.7 (36.9)	3.1 (37.6)	6 (43)	11 (52)	15.5 (59.9)	18.6 (65.5)	20.4 (68.7)	19.8 (67.6)	16 (61)	10.6 (51.1)	6.1 (43.0)	3.3 (37.9)	11.1 (52.0)
Daily mean °C (°F)	−0.2 (31.6)	−0.2 (31.6)	2.3 (36.1)	6.3 (43.3)	10.3 (50.5)	13.5 (56.3)	15.6 (60.1)	15.1 (59.2)	12 (54)	7.2 (45.0)	3.2 (37.8)	0.4 (32.7)	7.1 (44.9)
Mean daily minimum °C (°F)	−2.4 (27.7)	−2.7 (27.1)	−0.7 (30.7)	2.6 (36.7)	6 (43)	9.6 (49.3)	12.1 (53.8)	11.8 (53.2)	9 (48)	4.7 (40.5)	1 (34)	−1.8 (28.8)	4.1 (39.4)
Record low °C (°F)	−17.2 (1.0)	−14.4 (6.1)	−14.3 (6.3)	−6.4 (20.5)	−0.9 (30.4)	1.9 (35.4)	5.5 (41.9)	5.4 (41.7)	0.9 (33.6)	−5.3 (22.5)	−10.7 (12.7)	−15.7 (3.7)	−17.2 (1.0)
Average precipitation mm (inches)	283.7 (11.17)	222.3 (8.75)	189.5 (7.46)	120 (4.7)	104.3 (4.11)	106.5 (4.19)	117.3 (4.62)	173.8 (6.84)	218.9 (8.62)	264.7 (10.42)	269.9 (10.63)	300.3 (11.82)	2,371.2 (93.33)
Average precipitation days (≥ 1.0 mm)	19	17	17	14	13	13	15	16	16	17	19	20	196
Source 1: eklima/met.no
Source 2: NOAA - WMO averages 91-2020 Norway

== Government ==
Sauda Municipality is responsible for primary education (through 10th grade), outpatient health services, senior citizen services, welfare and other social services, zoning, economic development, and municipal roads and utilities. The municipality is governed by a municipal council of directly elected representatives. The mayor is indirectly elected by a vote of the municipal council. The municipality is under the jurisdiction of the Haugaland og Sunnhordland District Court and the Gulating Court of Appeal.

=== Municipal council ===
The municipal council (Kommunestyre) of Sauda Municipality is made up of 19 representatives that are elected to four year terms. The tables below show the current and historical composition of the council by political party.

Sauda kommunestyre 2023–2027
Party name (in Nynorsk)	Number of representatives
Labour Party (Arbeidarpartiet)	5
Conservative Party (Høgre)	5
Christian Democratic Party (Kristeleg Folkeparti)	1
Red Party (Raudt)	2
Centre Party (Senterpartiet)	5
Socialist Left Party (Sosialistisk Venstreparti)	1
Total number of members:	19

Sauda kommunestyre 2019–2023
Party name (in Nynorsk)	Number of representatives
Labour Party (Arbeidarpartiet)	4
Conservative Party (Høgre)	2
Christian Democratic Party (Kristeleg Folkeparti)	1
Centre Party (Senterpartiet)	11
Socialist Left Party (Sosialistisk Venstreparti)	1
Total number of members:	19

Sauda kommunestyre 2015–2019
Party name (in Nynorsk)	Number of representatives
Labour Party (Arbeidarpartiet)	5
Conservative Party (Høgre)	3
Christian Democratic Party (Kristeleg Folkeparti)	1
Centre Party (Senterpartiet)	9
Socialist Left Party (Sosialistisk Venstreparti)	1
Total number of members:	19

Sauda kommunestyre 2011–2015
Party name (in Norwegian)	Number of representatives
Labour Party (Arbeiderpartiet)	9
Progress Party (Fremskrittspartiet)	1
Conservative Party (Høyre)	4
Christian Democratic Party (Kristelig Folkeparti)	1
Centre Party (Senterpartiet)	2
Socialist Left Party (Sosialistisk Venstreparti)	1
Liberal Party (Venstre)	1
Total number of members:	19

Sauda kommunestyre 2007–2011
Party name (in Norwegian)	Number of representatives
Labour Party (Arbeiderpartiet)	10
Progress Party (Fremskrittspartiet)	2
Conservative Party (Høyre)	3
Christian Democratic Party (Kristelig Folkeparti)	1
Centre Party (Senterpartiet)	1
Socialist Left Party (Sosialistisk Venstreparti)	1
Liberal Party (Venstre)	1
Total number of members:	19

Sauda kommunestyre 2003–2007
Party name (in Norwegian)	Number of representatives
Labour Party (Arbeiderpartiet)	9
Progress Party (Fremskrittspartiet)	2
Conservative Party (Høyre)	3
Christian Democratic Party (Kristelig Folkeparti)	1
Centre Party (Senterpartiet)	2
Socialist Left Party (Sosialistisk Venstreparti)	2
Total number of members:	19

Sauda kommunestyre 1999–2003
Party name (in Norwegian)	Number of representatives
Labour Party (Arbeiderpartiet)	11
Conservative Party (Høyre)	5
Christian Democratic Party (Kristelig Folkeparti)	3
Centre Party (Senterpartiet)	3
Socialist Left Party (Sosialistisk Venstreparti)	4
Liberal Party (Venstre)	1
Total number of members:	27

Sauda kommunestyre 1995–1999
Party name (in Norwegian)	Number of representatives
Labour Party (Arbeiderpartiet)	9
Conservative Party (Høyre)	2
Christian Democratic Party (Kristelig Folkeparti)	3
Centre Party (Senterpartiet)	6
Socialist Left Party (Sosialistisk Venstreparti)	5
Liberal Party (Venstre)	2
Total number of members:	27

Sauda kommunestyre 1991–1995
Party name (in Norwegian)	Number of representatives
Labour Party (Arbeiderpartiet)	11
Conservative Party (Høyre)	3
Christian Democratic Party (Kristelig Folkeparti)	3
Centre Party (Senterpartiet)	5
Socialist Left Party (Sosialistisk Venstreparti)	4
Liberal Party (Venstre)	1
Total number of members:	27

Sauda kommunestyre 1987–1991
Party name (in Norwegian)	Number of representatives
Labour Party (Arbeiderpartiet)	12
Conservative Party (Høyre)	4
Christian Democratic Party (Kristelig Folkeparti)	3
Centre Party (Senterpartiet)	2
Socialist Left Party (Sosialistisk Venstreparti)	3
Liberal Party (Venstre)	3
Total number of members:	27

Sauda kommunestyre 1983–1987
Party name (in Norwegian)	Number of representatives
Labour Party (Arbeiderpartiet)	15
Conservative Party (Høyre)	5
Christian Democratic Party (Kristelig Folkeparti)	3
Centre Party (Senterpartiet)	2
Socialist Left Party (Sosialistisk Venstreparti)	1
Liberal Party (Venstre)	1
Total number of members:	27

Sauda kommunestyre 1979–1983
Party name (in Norwegian)	Number of representatives
Labour Party (Arbeiderpartiet)	12
Conservative Party (Høyre)	6
Christian Democratic Party (Kristelig Folkeparti)	4
New People's Party (Nye Folkepartiet)	1
Centre Party (Senterpartiet)	2
Socialist Left Party (Sosialistisk Venstreparti)	1
Liberal Party (Venstre)	1
Total number of members:	27

Sauda kommunestyre 1975–1979
Party name (in Norwegian)	Number of representatives
Labour Party (Arbeiderpartiet)	12
Christian Democratic Party (Kristelig Folkeparti)	4
Centre Party (Senterpartiet)	2
Socialist Left Party (Sosialistisk Venstreparti)	2
Joint list of the Conservative Party (Høyre), Liberal Party (Venstre), and New People's Party (Nye Folkepartiet)	7
Total number of members:	27

Sauda kommunestyre 1971–1975
Party name (in Norwegian)	Number of representatives
Labour Party (Arbeiderpartiet)	12
Conservative Party (Høyre)	2
Christian Democratic Party (Kristelig Folkeparti)	4
Centre Party (Senterpartiet)	3
Liberal Party (Venstre)	4
Socialist common list (Venstresosialistiske felleslister)	2
Total number of members:	27

Sauda kommunestyre 1967–1971
Party name (in Norwegian)	Number of representatives
Labour Party (Arbeiderpartiet)	12
Conservative Party (Høyre)	2
Christian Democratic Party (Kristelig Folkeparti)	4
Centre Party (Senterpartiet)	1
Socialist People's Party (Sosialistisk Folkeparti)	2
Liberal Party (Venstre)	4
Local List(s) (Lokale lister)	2
Total number of members:	27

Sauda kommunestyre 1963–1967
Party name (in Norwegian)	Number of representatives
Labour Party (Arbeiderpartiet)	12
Conservative Party (Høyre)	2
Christian Democratic Party (Kristelig Folkeparti)	4
Centre Party (Senterpartiet)	1
Socialist People's Party (Sosialistisk Folkeparti)	1
Liberal Party (Venstre)	6
Local List(s) (Lokale lister)	1
Total number of members:	27

Sauda herredsstyre 1959–1963
Party name (in Norwegian)	Number of representatives
Labour Party (Arbeiderpartiet)	12
Conservative Party (Høyre)	1
Communist Party (Kommunistiske Parti)	1
Christian Democratic Party (Kristelig Folkeparti)	3
Centre Party (Senterpartiet)	1
Liberal Party (Venstre)	7
Local List(s) (Lokale lister)	2
Total number of members:	27

Sauda herredsstyre 1955–1959
Party name (in Norwegian)	Number of representatives
Labour Party (Arbeiderpartiet)	12
Conservative Party (Høyre)	2
Communist Party (Kommunistiske Parti)	2
Christian Democratic Party (Kristelig Folkeparti)	3
Liberal Party (Venstre)	6
Local List(s) (Lokale lister)	2
Total number of members:	27

Sauda herredsstyre 1951–1955
Party name (in Norwegian)	Number of representatives
Labour Party (Arbeiderpartiet)	8
Conservative Party (Høyre)	1
Communist Party (Kommunistiske Parti)	2
Christian Democratic Party (Kristelig Folkeparti)	3
Liberal Party (Venstre)	4
Local List(s) (Lokale lister)	2
Total number of members:	20

Sauda herredsstyre 1947–1951
Party name (in Norwegian)	Number of representatives
Labour Party (Arbeiderpartiet)	7
Conservative Party (Høyre)	1
Communist Party (Kommunistiske Parti)	3
Christian Democratic Party (Kristelig Folkeparti)	3
Liberal Party (Venstre)	3
Local List(s) (Lokale lister)	3
Total number of members:	20

Sauda herredsstyre 1945–1947
Party name (in Norwegian)	Number of representatives
Labour Party (Arbeiderpartiet)	8
Communist Party (Kommunistiske Parti)	3
Christian Democratic Party (Kristelig Folkeparti)	3
Joint List(s) of Non-Socialist Parties (Borgerlige Felleslister)	6
Total number of members:	20

Sauda herredsstyre 1937–1941*
Party name (in Norwegian)	Number of representatives
Labour Party (Arbeiderpartiet)	9
Joint List(s) of Non-Socialist Parties (Borgerlige Felleslister)	8
Local List(s) (Lokale lister)	3
Total number of members:	20
Note: Due to the German occupation of Norway during World War II, no elections were held for new municipal councils until after the war ended in 1945.

=== Mayors ===
The mayor (Nynorsk: ordførar) of Sauda Municipality is the political leader of the municipality and the chairperson of the municipal council. The following people have held this position:

- 1842–1849: Orm O. Riisvold
- 1850–1861: Ole Christian Fløgstad
- 1862–1865: Orm O. Riisvold
- 1866–1868: Svend Tengesdal
- 1869–1873: Ole Christian Fløgstad
- 1874–1875: Bjedne Birkeland
- 1876–1879: Ole Christian Fløgstad
- 1880–1889: Iver Birkeland (MV)
- 1890–1891: Torjus Øie (V)
- 1892–1893: Iver Birkeland (MV)
- 1894–1897: Bjedne Birkeland (MV)
- 1898–1901: Jakob Teig (MV)
- 1902–1904: Torjus Øie (V)
- 1905–1907: Jakob Teig (H)
- 1908–1916: Kristen Fløgstad (V)
- 1917–1919: Kristoffer O. Djuve (V)
- 1920–1922: Kristen Fløgstad (V)
- 1923–1925: Kristoffer O. Djuve (V)
- 1926–1928: Sondof Rabbe (V)
- 1929–1937: Gerhard Haukenes (V)
- 1938–1941: Jakob Remseth (Ap)
- 1941–1945: Karl J. Fjørtoft (NS)
- 1945–1951: Jakob Remseth (Ap)
- 1952–1955: Erling Larsson (V)
- 1956–1959: Julius Rydningen (Ap)
- 1960–1961: Erling Larsson (V)
- 1962–1963: Paul Engebretsen (Ap)
- 1964–1967: Erling Larsson (V)
- 1968–1977: Hans Frette (Ap)
- 1977–1979: Alf Selland (Ap)
- 1980–1983: Kåre Årthun (H)
- 1984–1987: Jan Edvin Birkeland (Ap)
- 1988–1995: Olav Dybing (Ap)
- 1995–1999: Anne Marie Brekke (Sp)
- 1999–2005: Torfinn Opheim (Ap)
- 2005–2011: Laura Seltveit (Ap)
- 2011–2015: Frode Sulen (Ap)
- 2015–2023: Asbjørn Birkeland (Sp)
- 2023–present: Håvard Handeland (Ap)

== Economy ==
The main activity is industry, with large companies represented like Eramet, Saint-Gobain, Statkraft, Sauda Building Center, Statnett, Elkem, and Effektivt Renhold

== Tourism ==
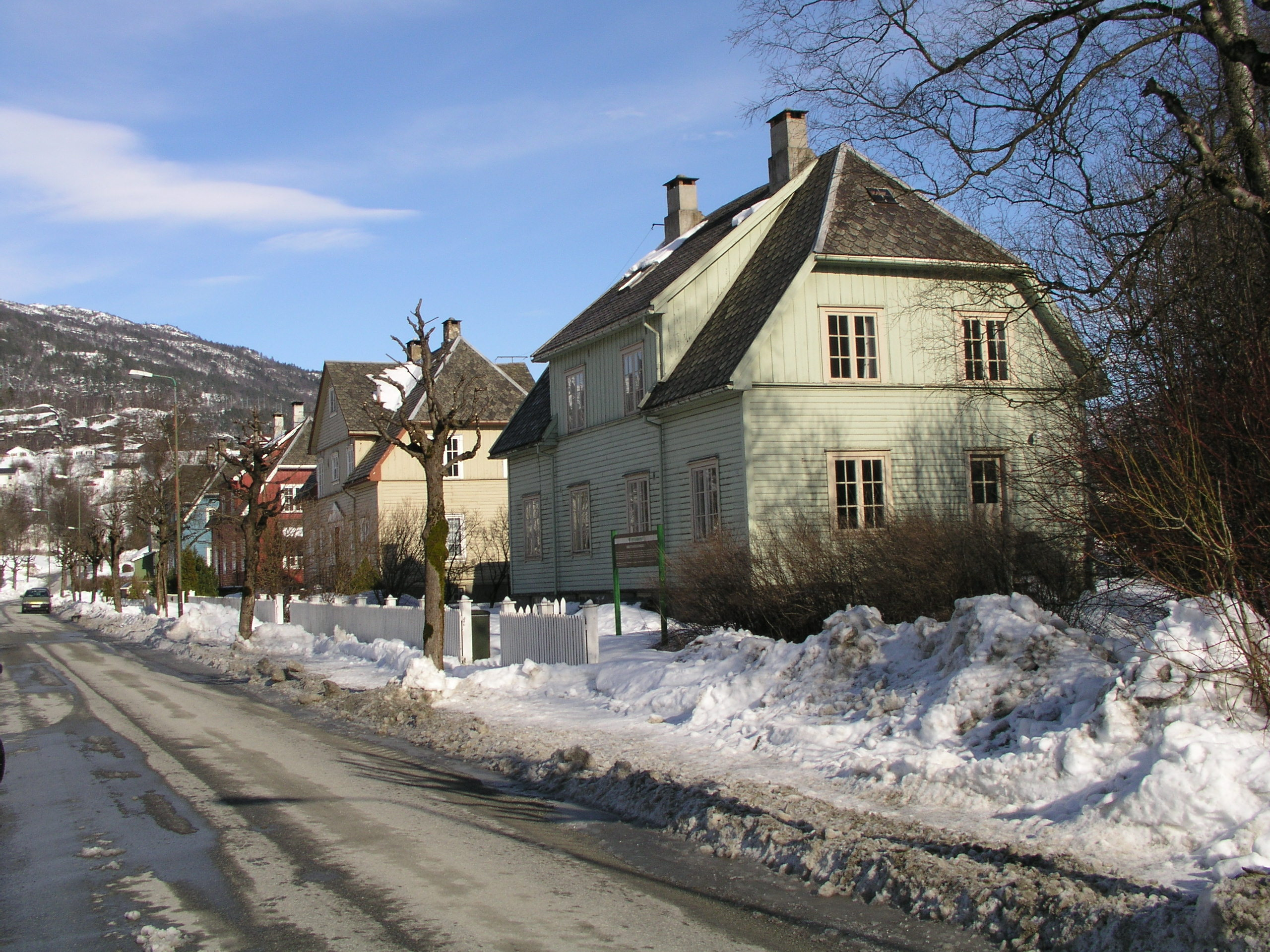
Industrial museum, Sauda, in winter.

=== Attractions ===
- Rondahaugen – with views over the city and out towards Stavanger
- Sauda Church, Solbrekk Chapel, Hellandsbygd Chapel, and Saudasjøen Chapel – local churches
- Allmannajuvet – old mines with guided tour
- Sauda Smelteverk – melting plant that is still active, guided tour after appointment
- Nordag – former aluminium melting plant in Saudasjøen
- Old Graveyard in Saudasjøen – containing tombs of Russian POWs who died when building the Nordag aluminium melting plant during World War II
- Tveittunet in Saudasjøen – old refurbished estate in Saudasjøen

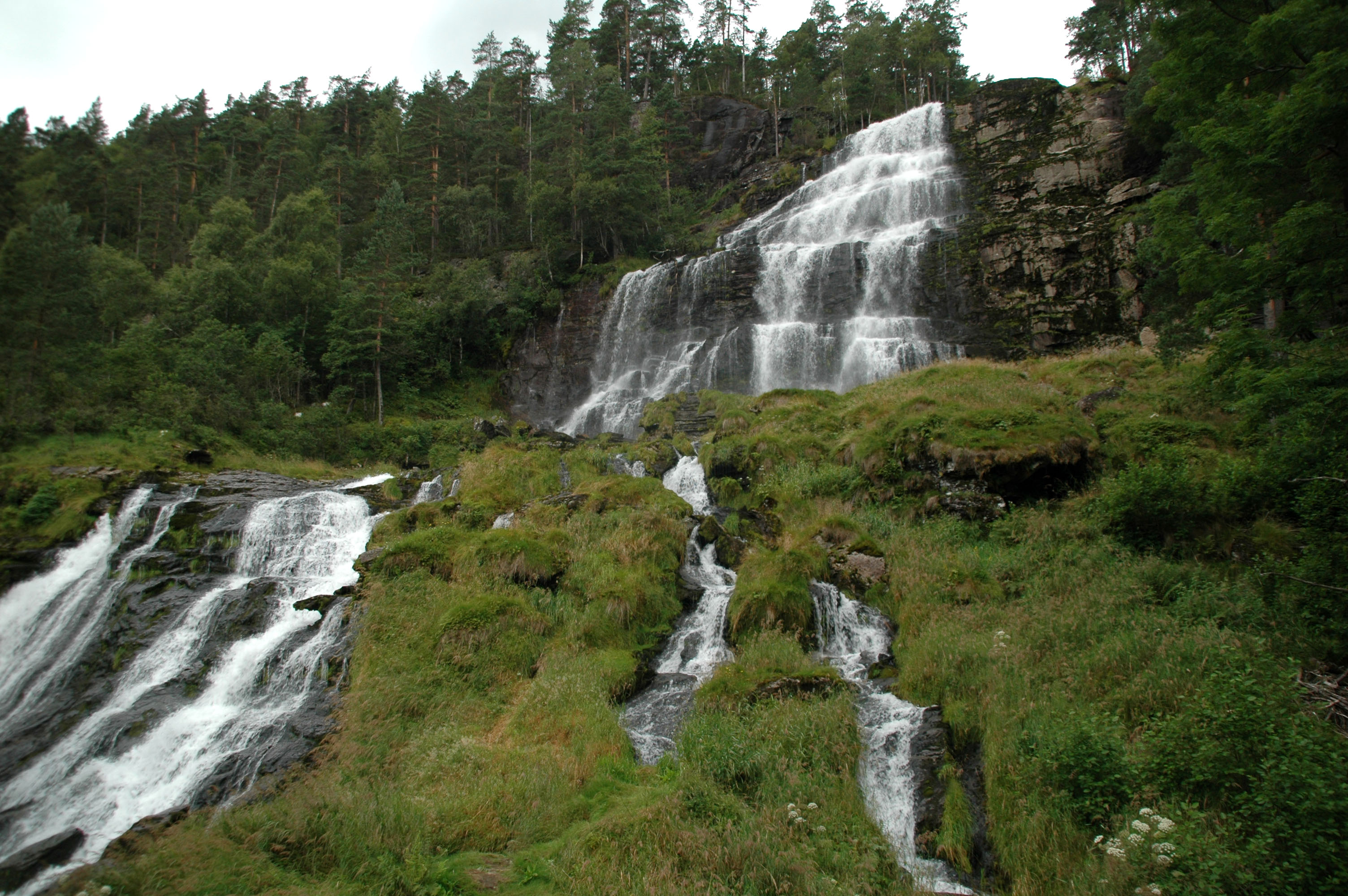
Svandalsfossen waterfall, Sauda

- Jonegarden på Hustveit – old refurbished farm and a lumber mill
- Løyning – old farm about 10 kilometers away from Sauda
- Risvoldtunet – food service, conference center, guided tour on a mini power plant
- Åbøbyen – best conserved North-American styled village area in Norway
- Honganvikfossen – a waterfall
- Svandalsfossen – a waterfall
- Jetegrytene in Åbødalen – rivers and waterfalls
- Sauda museum – collection in downtown Sauda featuring local heritage
- Industriarbeidermuseet – museum about the life of local workmen (1920s to 1950s)
- Fagerheimsaminga – exhibition of carved wooden figures in Saudahallen
- City walk – arrangement in summer time with a guided tour through the city of Sauda
- City center – during winter, heated streets are free of snow

== Notable people ==
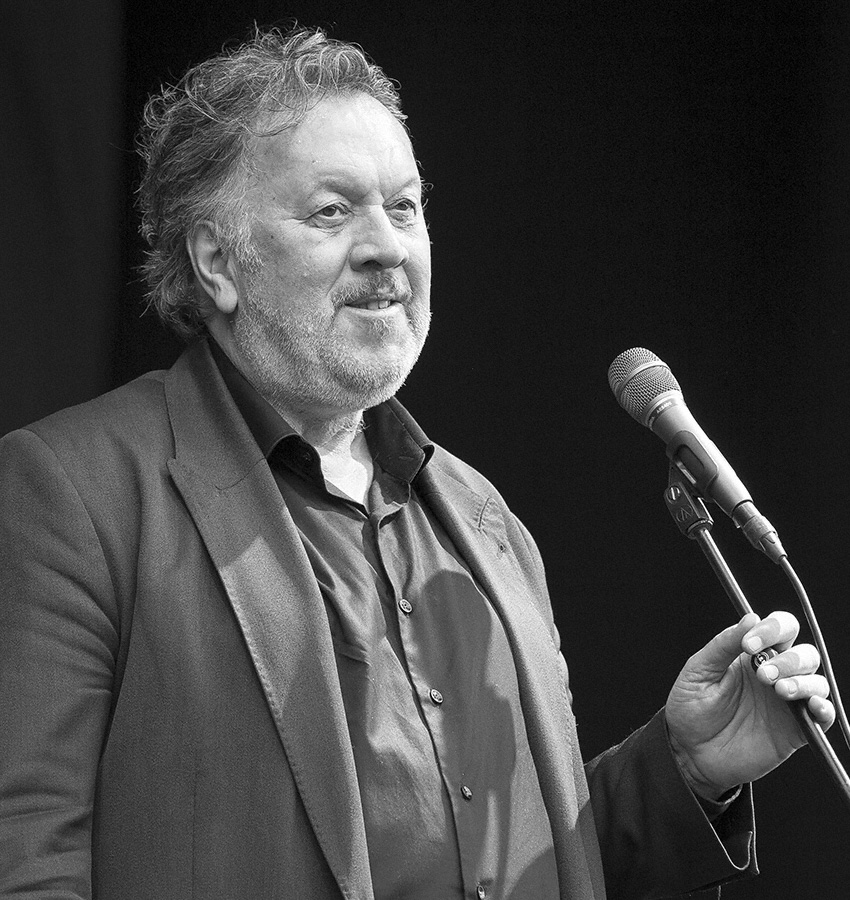
Bjørn Eidsvåg, 2016

- Jakob Aano (1920–2016), a politician who was a member of the Parliament of Norway
- Paul Engstad (1926–2012), a politician, journalist, and author
- Hans Frette (1927–1989), a politician, local mayor, and member of the Parliament of Norway
- Dr. Arne Fjørtoft (born 1937), a politician, journalist, and author
- Odd Bondevik (1941–2014), the Bishop of the Diocese of Møre in the Church of Norway
- Kjartan Fløgstad (born 1944), an author who was associated with magic realism in Norway
- Svein Mathisen (1952–2011), a footballer with 329 club appearances and 25 for Norway
- Bjørn Eidsvåg (born 1954), a singer, songwriter, and ordained Lutheran minister
- Torfinn Opheim (born 1961), a former mayor and member of the Parliament of Norway
- Hildeborg Juvet Hugdal, (Norwegian Wiki) (born 1983), a powerlifter known as the World's Strongest Woman

== Twin towns — sister cities ==
Sauda has sister city agreements with the following places:

- San Juan del Sur, Nicaragua
