= São Paulo =

Most populous city in Brazil

- Municipality
- Municipality of São Paulo
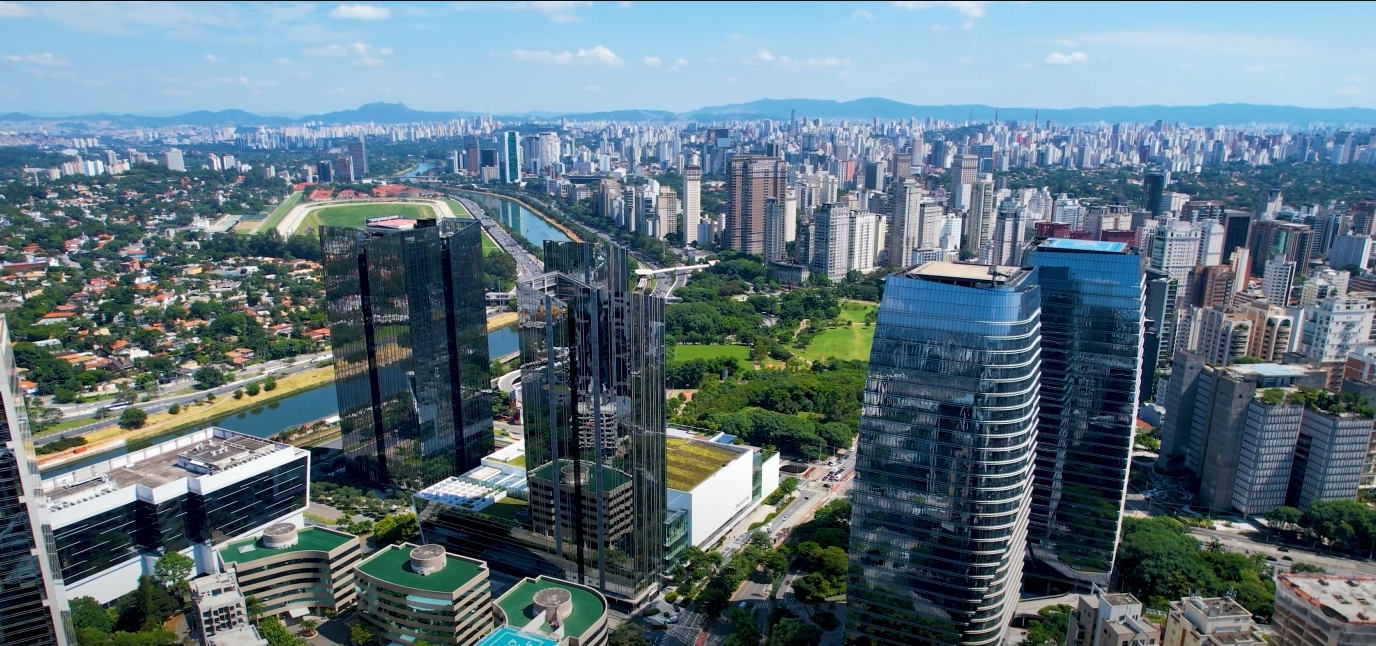
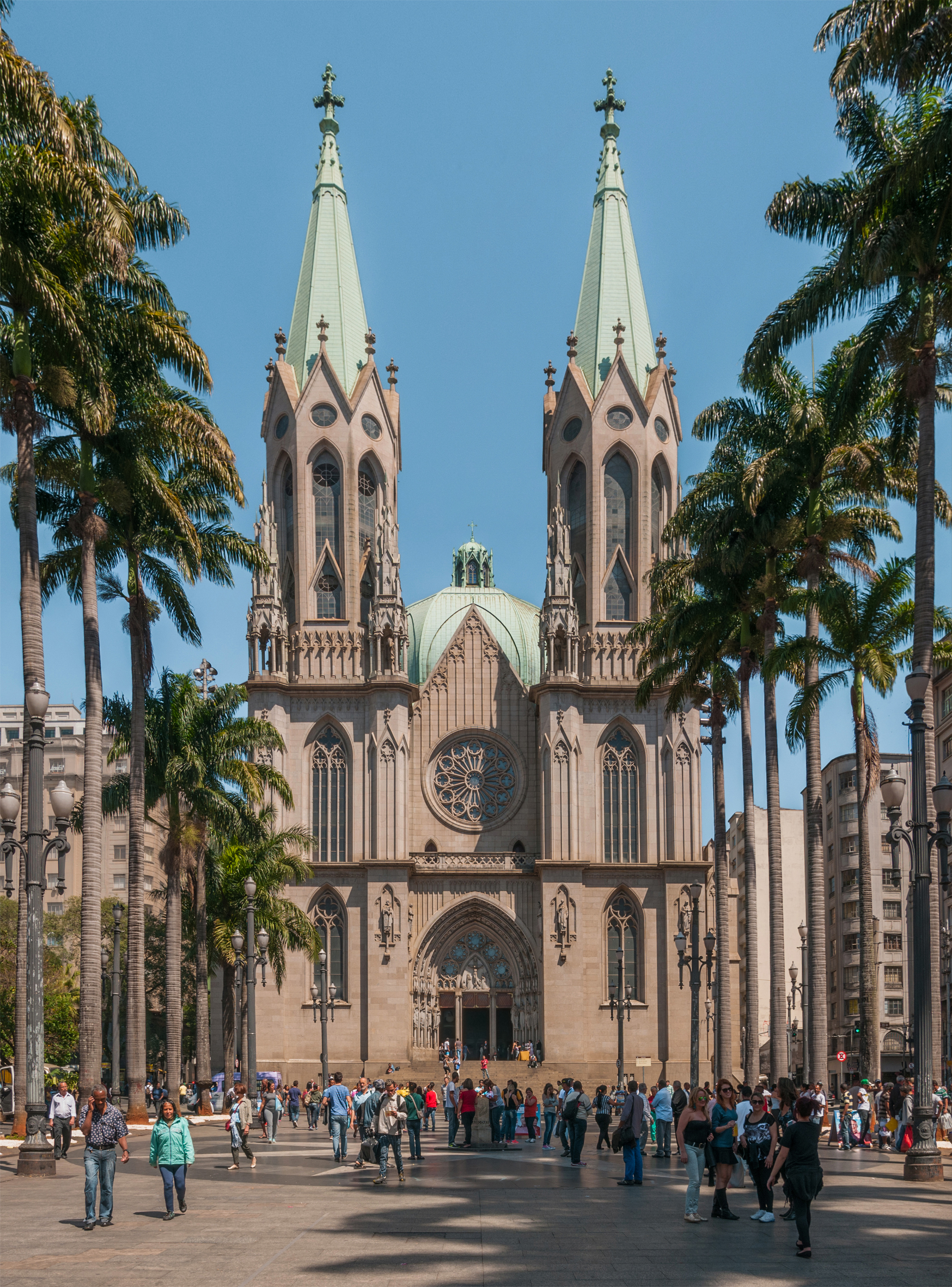
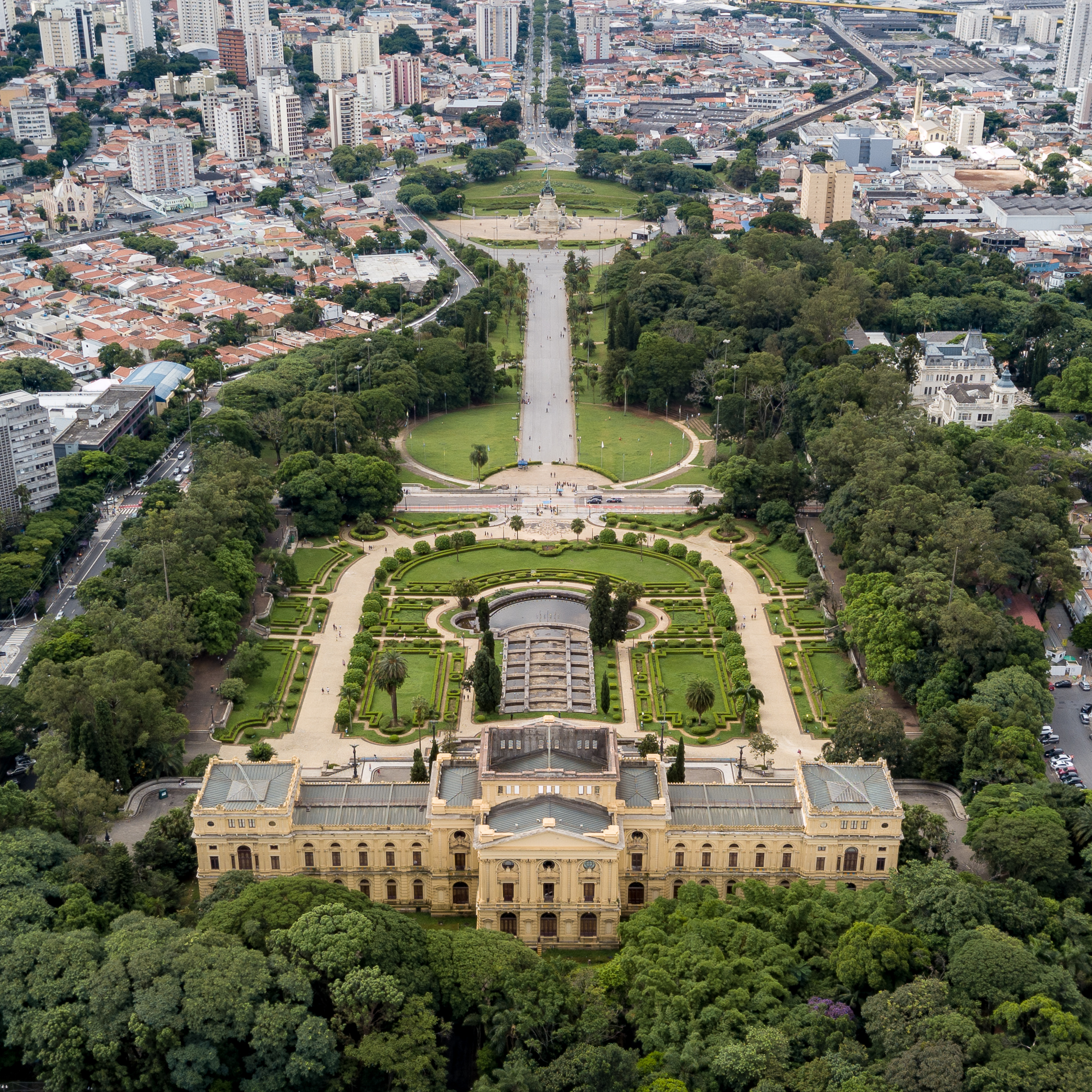
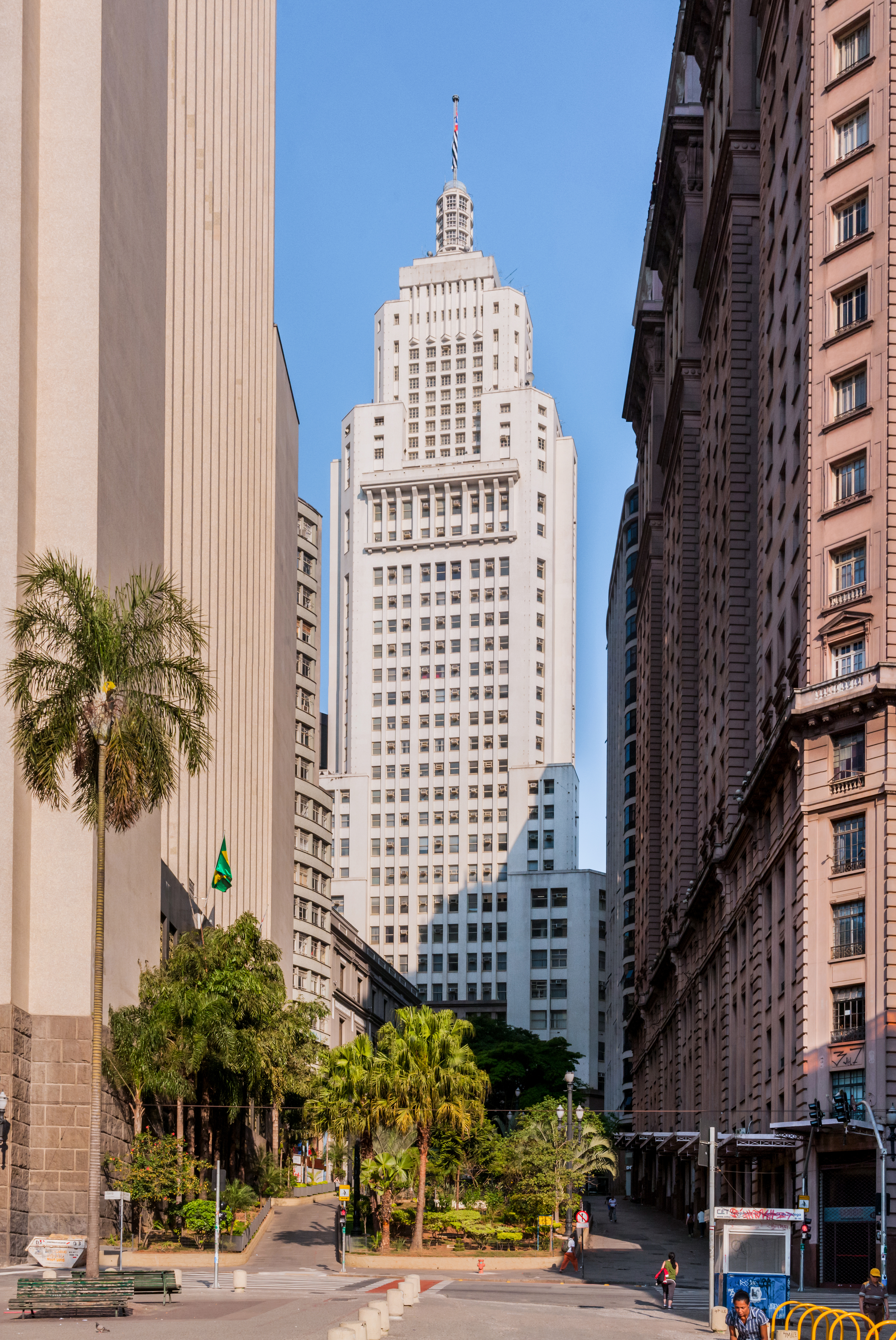
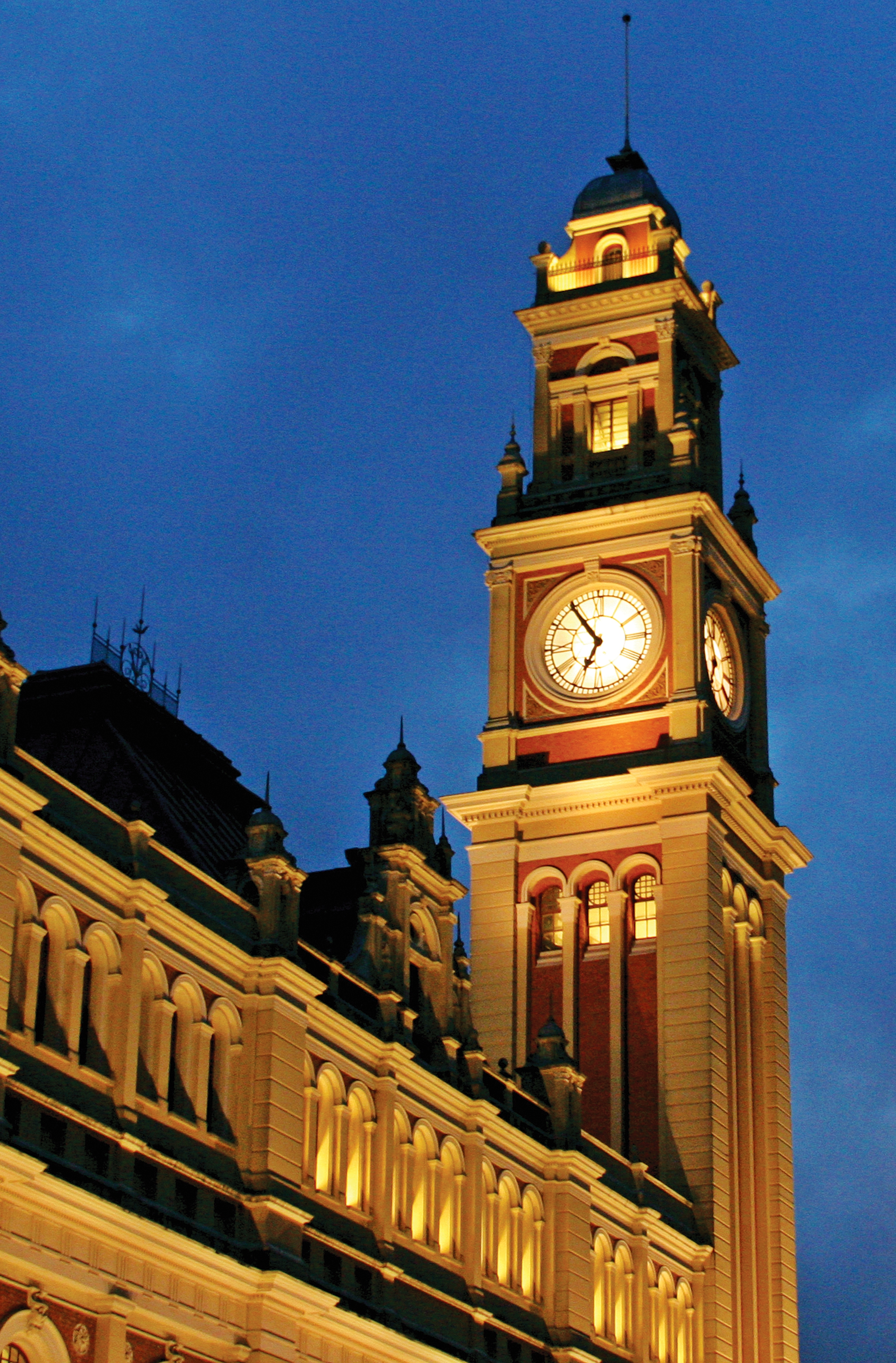
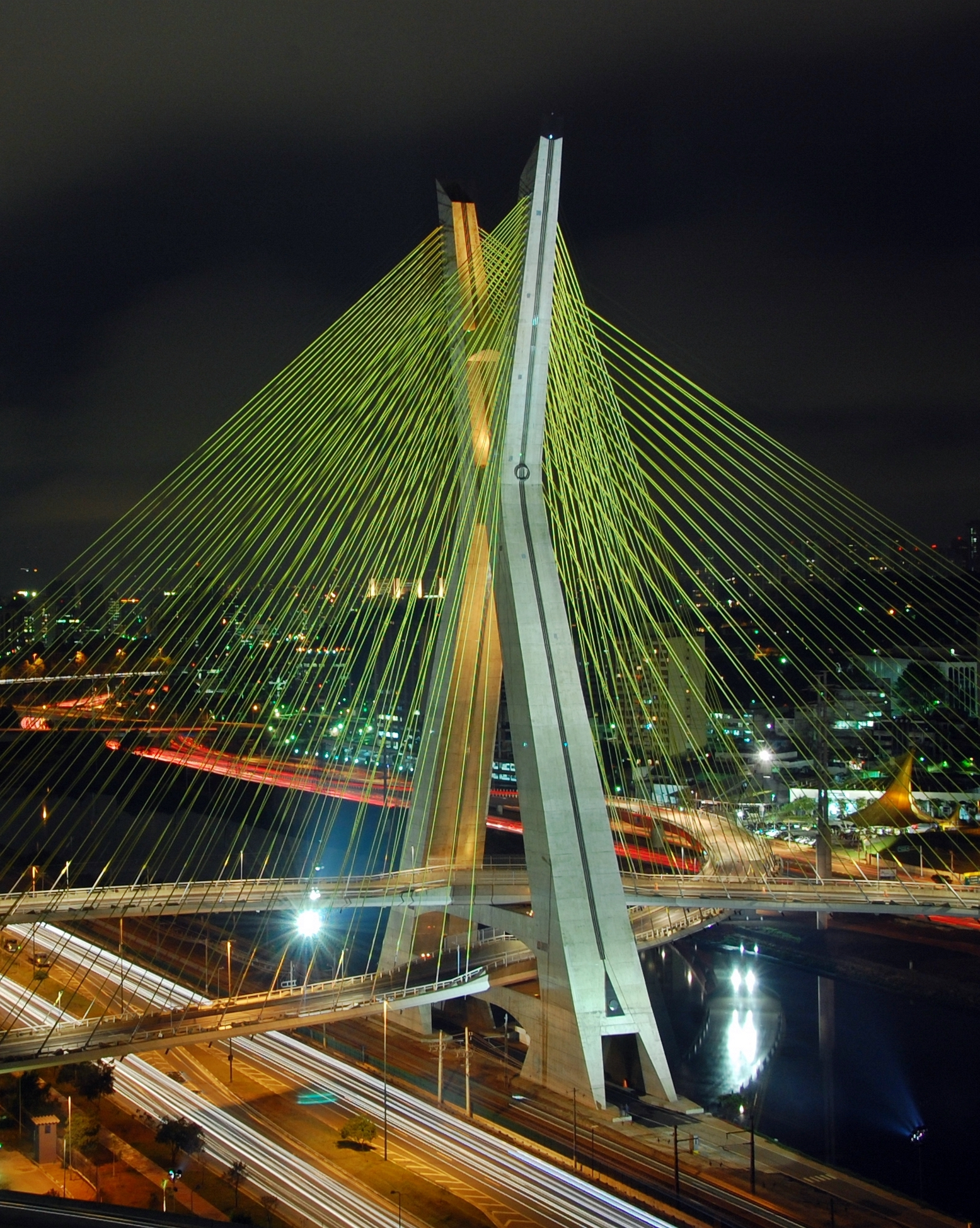
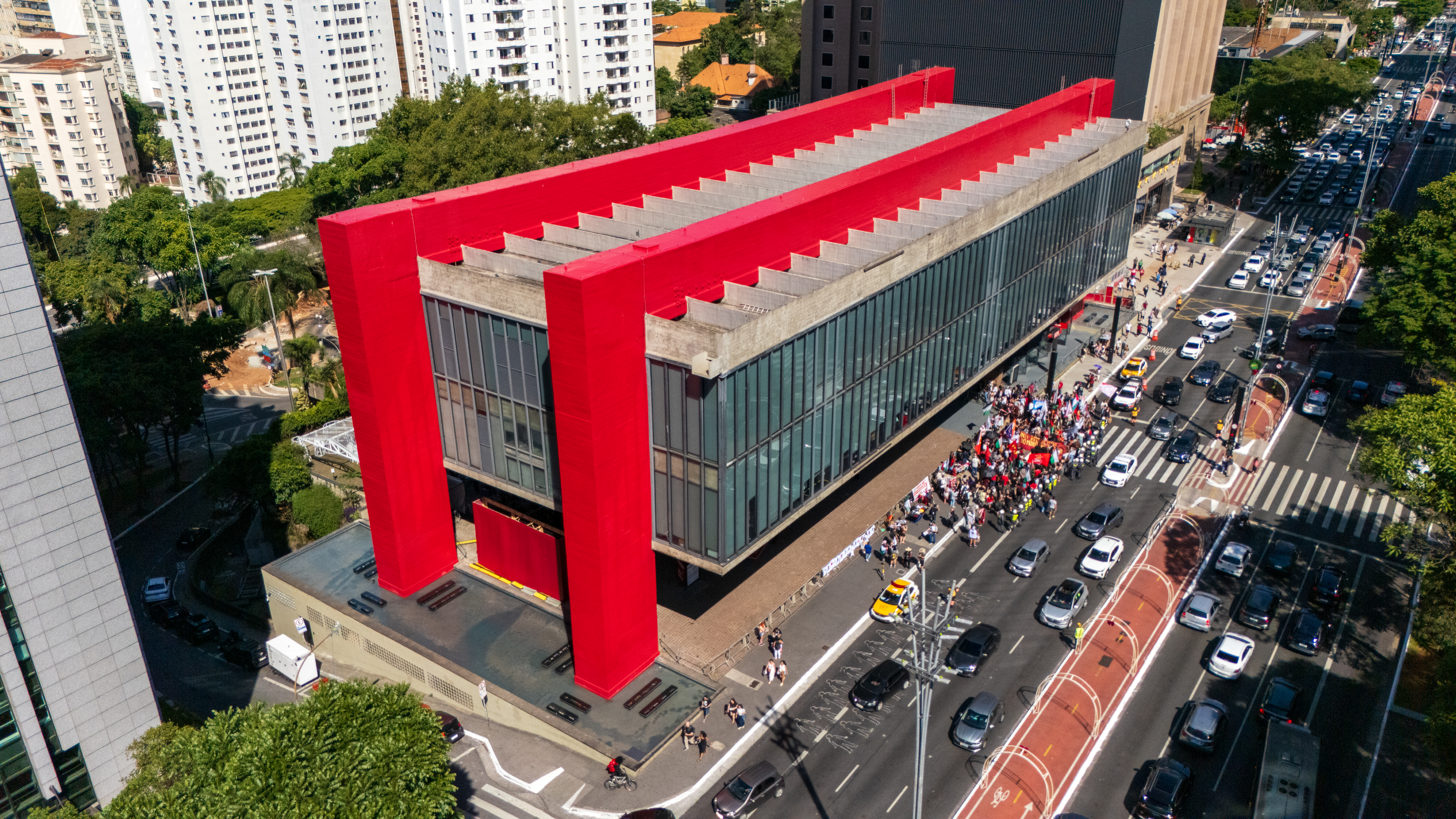
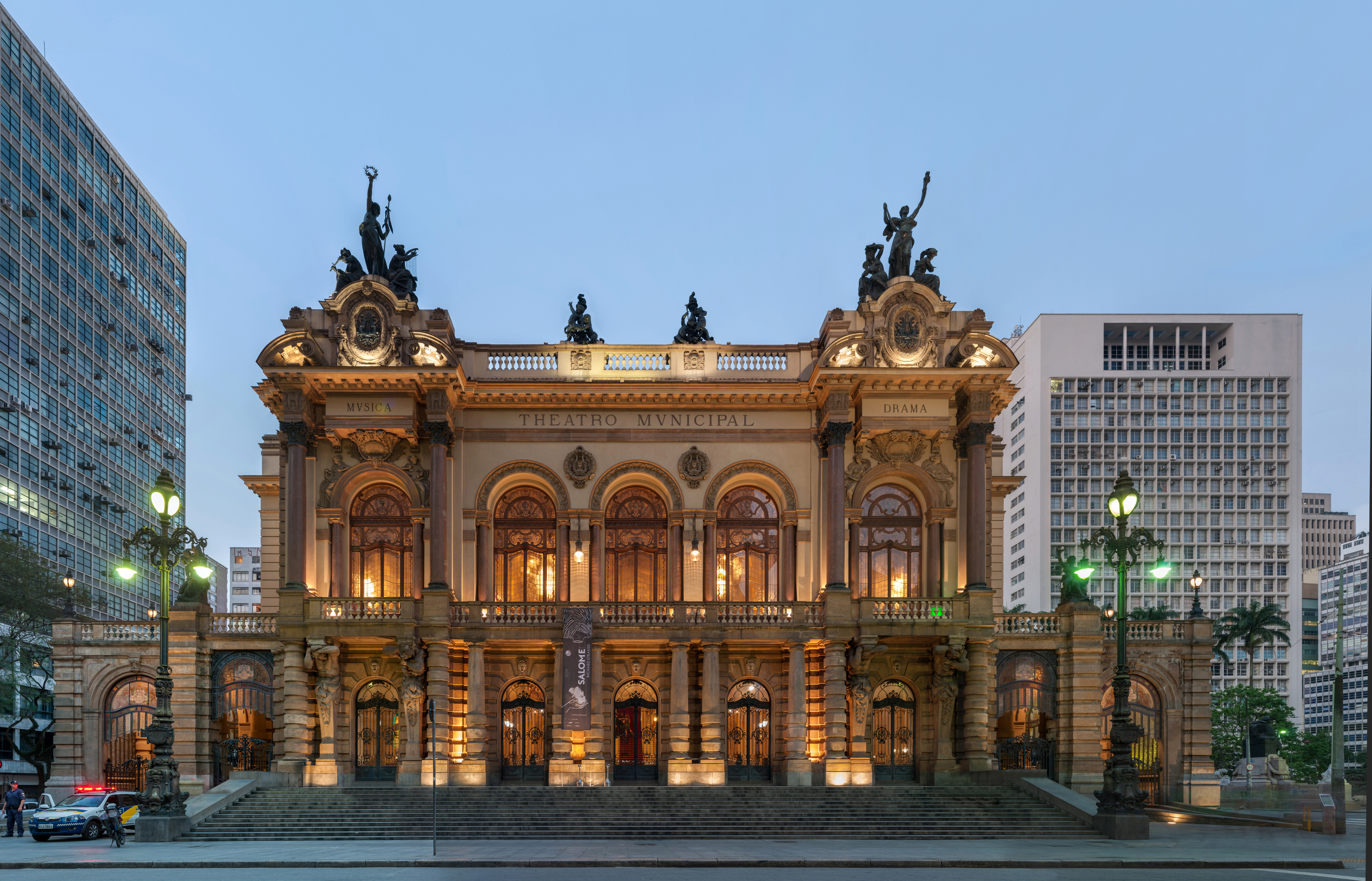
- Skyline from Vila Olímpia, highlighting Parque do Povo, Marginal Pinheiros, Jockey Club and Pico do Jaraguá (background). São Paulo Cathedral Obelisk at Ibirapuera Park Ipiranga Museum at Independence Park Altino Arantes Building Luz Station Octávio Frias de Oliveira Bridge MASP on Paulista Avenue Theatro Municipal

- Flag Coat of arms
- Nicknames: Selva de Pedra (Concrete Jungle); Terra da Garoa (Drizzle Land); Sampa; "Pauliceia Desvairada" (Crazy Pauliceia)
- Motto: "Non ducor, duco" (Latin) "I am not led, I lead"
- Interactive map of São Paulo
- Location in Brazil São Paulo (South America)
- Coordinates: 23°33′S 46°38′W
- Country: Brazil
- Region: Southeast
- State: São Paulo
- Founded: 25 January 1554; 472 years ago
- Founder: Manuel da Nóbrega and Joseph of Anchieta
- Named for: Paul the Apostle

Government
  - Type: Mayor–council
  - Body: Municipal Chamber
  - Mayor: Ricardo Nunes (MDB)
  - Vice Mayor: Mello Araújo

Area
  - Municipality: 1,521.20 km^{2} (587.34 sq mi)
  - Urban: 11,698 km^{2} (4,517 sq mi)
  - Metro: 7,946.96 km^{2} (3,068.34 sq mi)
  - Macrometropolis: 53,369.61 km^{2} (20,606.12 sq mi)
- Elevation: 760 m (2,490 ft)

Population (2025)
  - Municipality: 11,904,961
  - Rank: 1st in the Americas; 1st in Brazil
  - Density: 7,819.86/km^{2} (20,253.3/sq mi)
  - Metro: 21,518,955 (Greater São Paulo)
  - Metro density: 2,714.45/km^{2} (7,030.4/sq mi)
  - Macrometropolis (Extended Metro): 34,500,000
- Demonym: Paulistano/a

GDP (nominal, 2023)
  - Metro: R$1.77 trillion (US$316.82 billion)
  - Per capita: R$82,350 (US$14,723.76)
- Time zone: UTC– 03:00 (BRT)
- Postal Code (CEP): 01000-000
- Area code: +55 11
- HDI (2021): 0.821 – very high
- Climate: humid subtropical climate (Cfa)
- Website: capital.sp.gov.br

São Paulo (/ˌsaʊ(m) ˈpaʊloʊ/; Portuguese: [sɐ̃w ˈpawlu]; Portuguese for 'Saint Paul') is the capital and largest city of the state of São Paulo. The largest city in Brazil, it is also the most populous city in the Americas. The city exerts international influence in commerce, finance, culture, gastronomy, arts, fashion, technology, entertainment and media, having been listed by UNESCO's Creative Cities Network as a "City of Film" and the title of "World Capital of Gastronomy", and by the Globalization and World Cities Research Network (GaWC) as an alpha global city. It is the largest urban area by population outside Asia and the most populous Portuguese-speaking city in the world. The city is named after Paul the Apostle and people from the capital city are known as paulistanos (while paulistas refers to people from the state of São Paulo more generally).

Founded in 1554 by Jesuit priests, São Paulo is one of the oldest continuously inhabited cities on the American continents. It played a strategic role during the Brazilian colonial period, serving as the center and starting point for the expeditions of the Paulista bandeirantes (pioneers) settlers for the territorial and economic expansion of the country; however, its economic opulence was consolidated during the Brazilian coffee cycle in the mid-19th century. From that period onward, it became the stage for landmark events in Brazilian history, such as the Cry of Ipiranga, the Modern Art Week, the 1932 Revolution, and the Diretas Já (Direct Elections Now) movement. In the 20th century, industrialisation consolidated its role as the main national economic hub, which made the city a cosmopolitan melting pot, home to the largest Arab, Italian, and Japanese diasporas in the world, with ethnic enclaves like Bixiga, Bom Retiro, and Liberdade, and people from more than 200 other countries. The city's metropolitan area, Greater São Paulo, is home to more than 20 million inhabitants and ranks as the most populous in Brazil and one of the most populous in the world. The process of conurbation between the metropolitan areas around Greater São Paulo also created the São Paulo Macrometropolis, the first megalopolis in the Southern Hemisphere, with more than 30 million inhabitants.

São Paulo is the largest urban economy in Latin America and one of the world's major financial centres, representing around 10% of the Brazilian GDP and just over a third of São Paulo state's GDP (the only Brazilian city to surpass the 1 trillion reais mark in GDP). The city is the headquarters of B3, the largest stock exchange of Latin America by market capitalization, and has several financial districts, mainly in the areas around Paulista, Faria Lima and Berrini avenues. Home to 63% of established multinationals in Brazil and the source of around one third of the Brazilian scientific production, São Paulo is among the top 50 science and technology clusters in the world. Its main university, the University of São Paulo, is often considered the best in Brazil and Latin America, while the city is regularly ranked as one of the best cities in the world to be a university student in the QS World University Rankings. The metropolis is also home to several of the tallest skyscrapers in Brazil, including the Alto das Nações, Platina 220, Figueira Altos do Tatuapé, Mirante do Vale, Edifício Itália, Altino Arantes Building, North Tower and many others. It is the state capital with the best basic sanitation, the second-most developed, according to the FIRJAN Municipal Development Index (2025), the sixth in the Social Progress Index (IPS) in Brazil, and the ninth most wooded in the country, which earned it the international titles of "Tree City of the World" from the United Nations (UN) and "Ibero-American Green Capital", in addition to recognition from Guinness World Records for the "largest food security program in the world".

The place of origin and/or disseminator of countless artistic, cultural, and gastronomic expressions, such as the caipira culture and cuisine, sertanejo music, Brazilian hip-hop and rock, and samba paulista, and the culinary matrix of creations like bauru, beirute, calabresa, coxinha, dadinho, parmegiana, pastel de feira, and picanha, the city is one of the main cultural, gastronomic, and entertainment hubs in the world. It is home to monuments, parks, and museums, such as the Latin American Memorial, Ibirapuera Park, São Paulo Museum of Art, Pinacoteca, Cinemateca, Itaú Cultural, Museum of Ipiranga, Catavento Museum, Football Museum, Museum of the Portuguese Language, and the Museum of Image and Sound. São Paulo also holds notable cultural events like the São Paulo Art Biennial, São Paulo Fashion Week, Lollapalooza, Primavera Sound, Comic Con Experience and the São Paulo Gay Pride Parade, the largest LGBT event in the world. São Paulo has also hosted many sporting events such as the 1950 and 2014 FIFA World Cups, the 1963 Pan American Games, the São Paulo Indy 300 and the NFL Brazil Games, in addition to hosting the annual Brazilian Grand Prix of Formula One and the Saint Silvester Road Race.

== History ==
=== Pre-Cabraline period ===
The first organised human settlements in the modern-day state of São Paulo is believed to have taken place in the early millennia of the Holocene, between 11,000 and 9,000 years ago. The oldest archaeological artefacts ever discovered in the municipality of São Paulo come from the Morumbi site, theorised to be from around 3500 BC.

Historical affiliations

Portuguese Empire 1554–1815
United Kingdom of Portugal, Brazil and the Algarves 1815–1822
Empire of Brazil 1822–1889
Republic of Brazil 1889–present

The region of modern-day São Paulo, originally known as Piratininga plains around the Tietê River, was inhabited by the Tupi people, such as the Tupiniquim, Guaianás, and Guarani. Other tribes also lived in areas that today form the metropolitan region.

The region was divided in Caciquedoms (chiefdoms) at the time of encounter with the Europeans. The most notable cacique was Tibiriçá, known for his support for the Portuguese and other European colonists. Among the many indigenous place names that remain are Tietê, Ipiranga, Tamanduateí, Anhangabaú, Piratininga, Itaquaquecetuba, Cotia, Itapevi, Barueri, Embu-Guaçu, etc.

=== Portuguese colonisation ===
In 1532, Martim Afonso de Sousa founded the first Brazilian village of São Vicente on the coast of São Paulo. There, the first conflict between Europeans in South America took place, the Iguape War. Donatário of the Captaincy of São Vicente, Martim Afonso encouraged the occupation of the region.

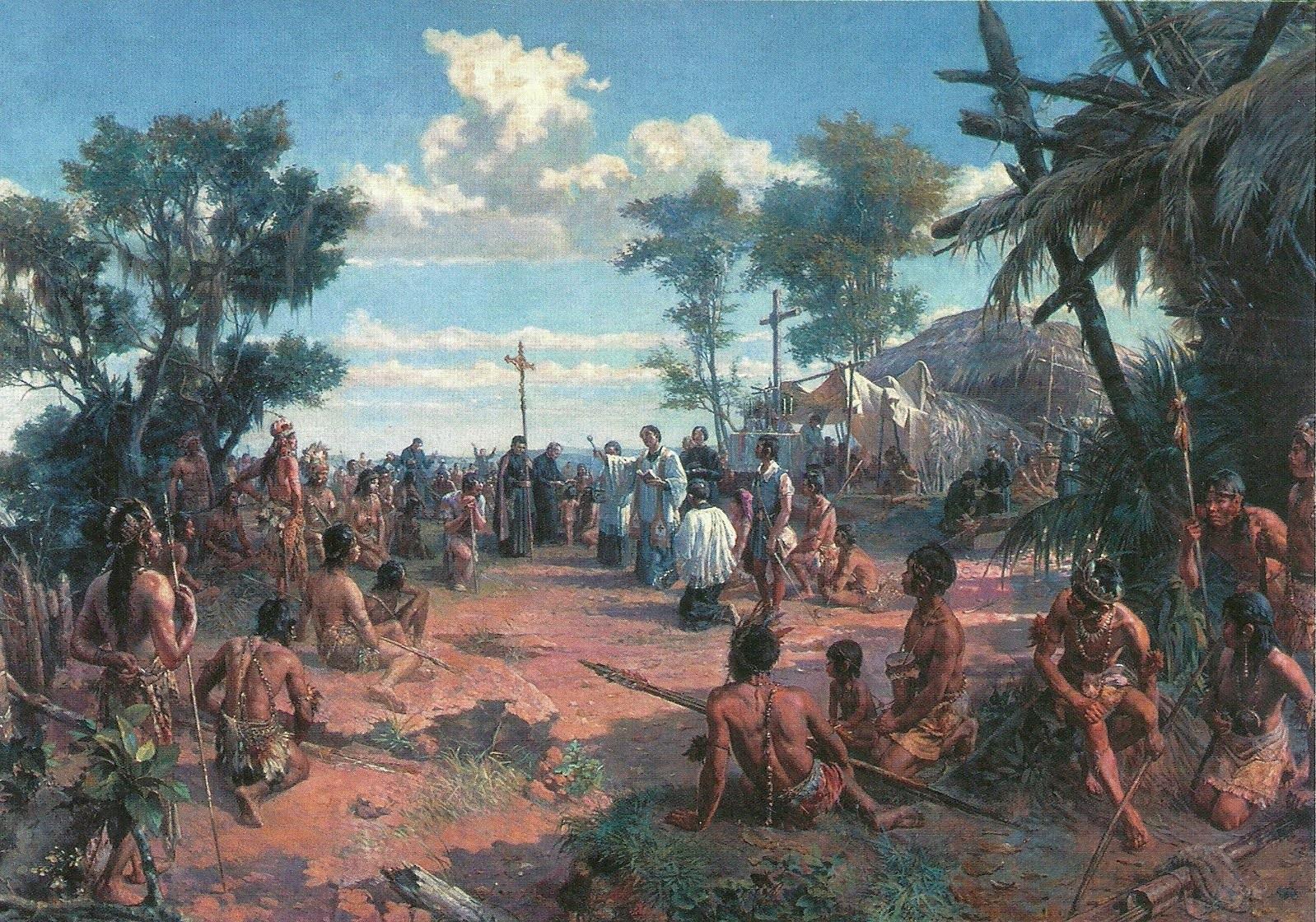
Founding of São Paulo, 1909 painting by Oscar Pereira da Silva

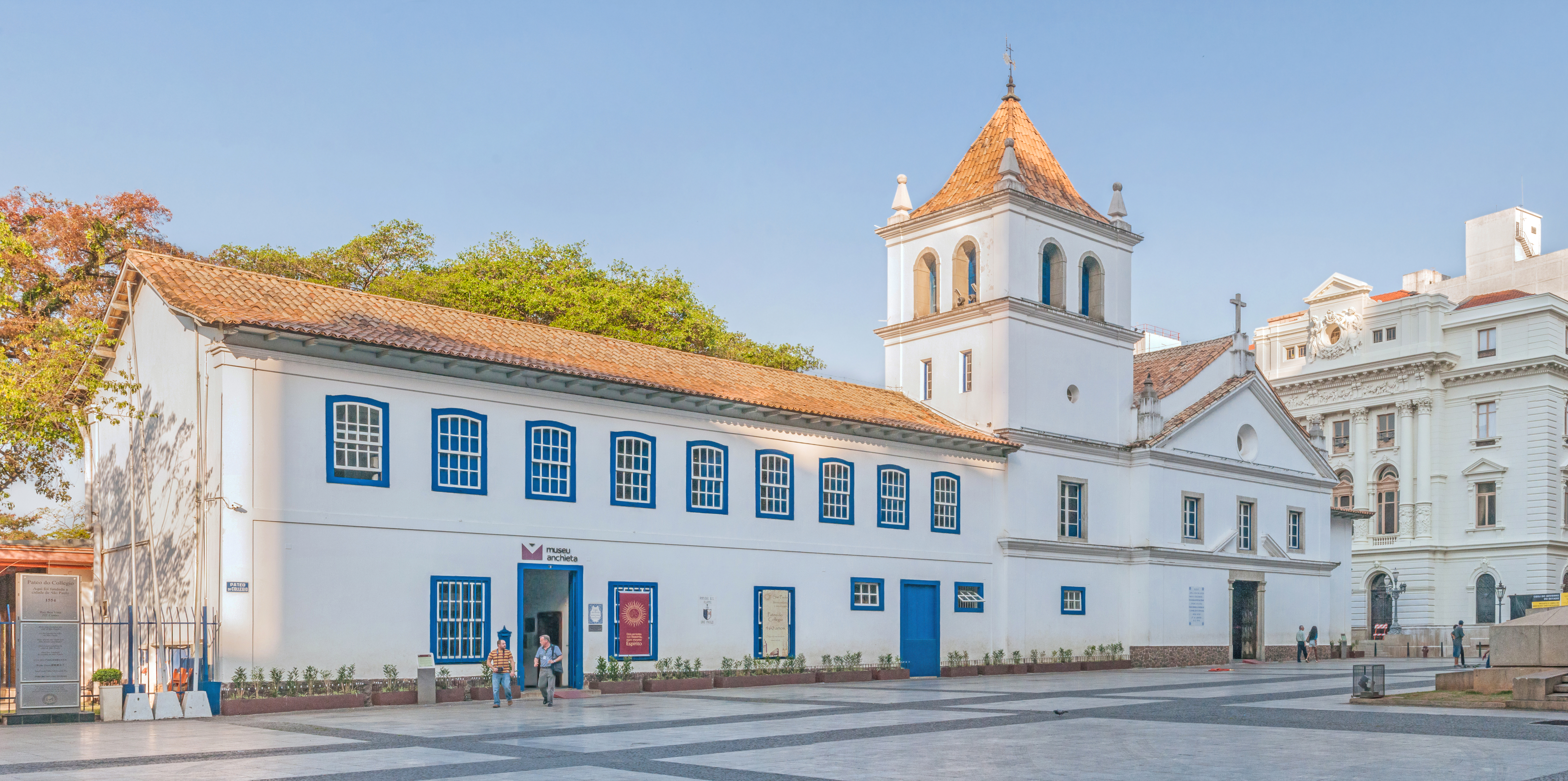
The courtyard of the college, Pátio do Colégio, in the Historic Center of São Paulo. At this location, the city was founded in 1554. The current building is a reconstruction made in the late 20th century, based on the Jesuit college and church that were erected at the site in 1653.

The Portuguese village of São Paulo dos Campos de Piratininga was marked by the founding of the Colégio de São Paulo de Piratininga on 25 January 1554 founded to catechise the indigenous peoples. The Jesuit college of twelve priests included Manuel da Nóbrega and Spanish priest José de Anchieta. They built a mission on top of a steep hill between the Anhangabaú and Tamanduateí rivers.

They first had a small structure built of rammed earth, made by Native Indian workers in their traditional style. The priests wanted to evangelize these Indians who lived in the Plateau region of Piratininga and convert them to Christianity. The site was separated from the coast by the Serra do Mar mountain range, called "Serra Paranapiacaba" by the Indians.

The college was named for a Christian saint and its founding on the feast day of the celebration of the conversion of the Apostle Paul of Tarsus. Father José de Anchieta wrote this account in a letter to the Society of Jesus:

The settlement of the region's Courtyard of the College began in 1560. During the visit of Mem de Sá, Governor-General of Brazil, the Captaincy of São Vicente, he ordered the transfer of the population of the Village of São Bernardo do Campo to the vicinity of the college. It was then named "College of St. Paul of the Piratininga". The new location was on a steep hill adjacent to a large wetland, the Várzea do Carmo. It offered better protection from attacks by local Indian groups. It was renamed Vila de São Paulo, belonging to the Captaincy of São Vicente.

In 1562, troubled by the alliance between the Tupiniquim and the Portuguese, the Tupinambás, united and launched a series of attacks against the village on 9 July. The defence organised by Tibiriçá and João Ramalho prevented the Tupinambás from entering São Paulo, and forced their retreat on 10 July of that year.

On 22 March 1681, Luís Álvares de Castro, the Second Marquis de Cascais and donee of the Captaincy of São Vicente, moved the capital to the village of São Paulo (see Timeline of São Paulo), designating it the "Head of the captaincy". The new capital was established on 23 April 1683, with public celebrations.

=== Capital of the captaincy ===
During the following two centuries, São Paulo remained a poor village isolated from the colony's centre of gravity, the coast, maintaining itself through subsistence crops. This isolation of São Paulo's isolation was mainly due to the fact that it was very difficult to climb the Serra do Mar on foot from the village of Santos or the village of São Vicente to the Piratininga Plateau. This ascent was made by the Caminho do Padre José de Anchieta. Mem de Sá, during his visit to the Captaincy of São Vicente, had forbidden the use of the "Caminho do Piraiquê" (today Piaçaguera), due to frequent assults by natives.

In the 17th century, men engaged in mineral exploration, the enslavement of Indigenous peoples, and the capture of runaway slaves in the southeast, then known as "paulistas" or "sertanistas," mobilised the expeditions of the bandeiras. Generally departing from São Paulo, these expeditions followed river courses, establishing trails and support points that would later develop into cities. Although they contributed to the territorial expansion of the colony of the State of Brazil, they were primarily characterised by the capture of Indigenous people for enslavement, often through attacks on Jesuit villages and missions. The principal "bandeirantes" included Fernão Dias Pais, Manuel de Borba Gato, Bartolomeu Bueno da Silva (Anhanguera), Domingos Jorge Velho, Antônio Raposo Tavares, Nicolau Barreto, and Manuel Preto.

In 1640, the Jesuits' strong opposition to the bandeirantes' capture and commercialisation of Indian labour led to conflicts between the two groups, culminating expulsion of the Jesuits from São Paulo until 1653.

The discovery of gold in the region of Minas Gerais, in the 1690s, brought attention and new settlers to São Paulo. The Captaincy of São Paulo and Minas de Ouro (see Captaincies of Brazil) was created on 3 November 1709, when the Portuguese crown purchased the Captaincies of São Paulo and Santo Amaro from the former grantees. Although less profitable than mines in Minas Gerais, Mato Grosso and Goiás, the search for gold in the then São Paulo de Piratininga is regarded as the first mining attempt in Portuguese South America, motivating the creation (Casa de fundição) of a Foundry House in the first century of colonisation.

Conveniently located in the country, up the steep Serra do Mar escarpment/mountain range when traveling from Santos, while also not too far from the coastline, São Paulo became a safe place to stay for tired travelers. The town became a center for the bandeirantes, intrepid invaders who marched into unknown lands in search for gold, diamonds, precious stones, and Indians to enslave. The bandeirantes, which could be translated as "flag-bearers" or "flag-followers", mounted expeditions into the land with the primary purpose of profit and the expansion of territory for the Portuguese crown. Trade grew from the local markets and from providing food and accommodation for explorers. The bandeirantes eventually became politically powerful as a group, and forced the expulsion of the Jesuits from the city of São Paulo in 1640. The two groups had frequently come into conflict because of the Jesuits' opposition to the domestic slave trade in Indians.

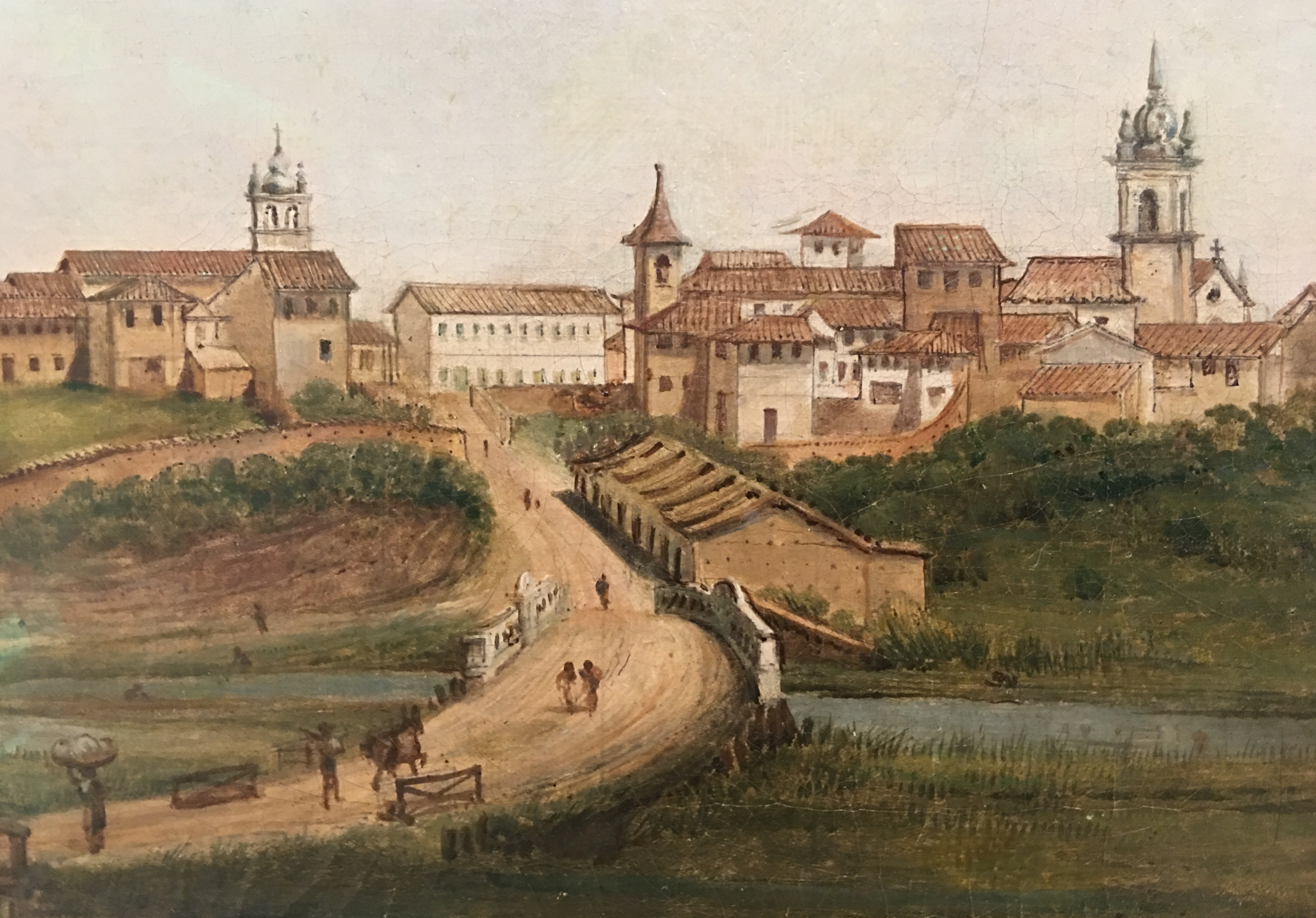
The east entrance to São Paulo in 1821, by Arnaud Julien Pallière (1784–1862)

On 11 July 1711, the town of São Paulo was elevated to city status. Around the 1720s, gold was found by the pioneers in the regions near what are now Cuiabá and Goiânia. The Portuguese expanded their Brazilian territory beyond the Tordesillas Line to incorporate the gold regions. When the gold ran out in the late 18th century, São Paulo shifted to growing sugar cane. Cultivation of this commodity crop spread through the interior of the Captaincy.

The sugar was exported through the Port of Santos. At that time, the first modern highway between São Paulo and the coast was constructed and named the Calçada do Lorena ("Lorena's settway"). Today the estate that is home to the Governor of the State of São Paulo, in the city of São Paulo, is called the Palácio dos Bandeirantes (Bandeirantes Palace), in the Morumbi district.

=== Imperial period ===
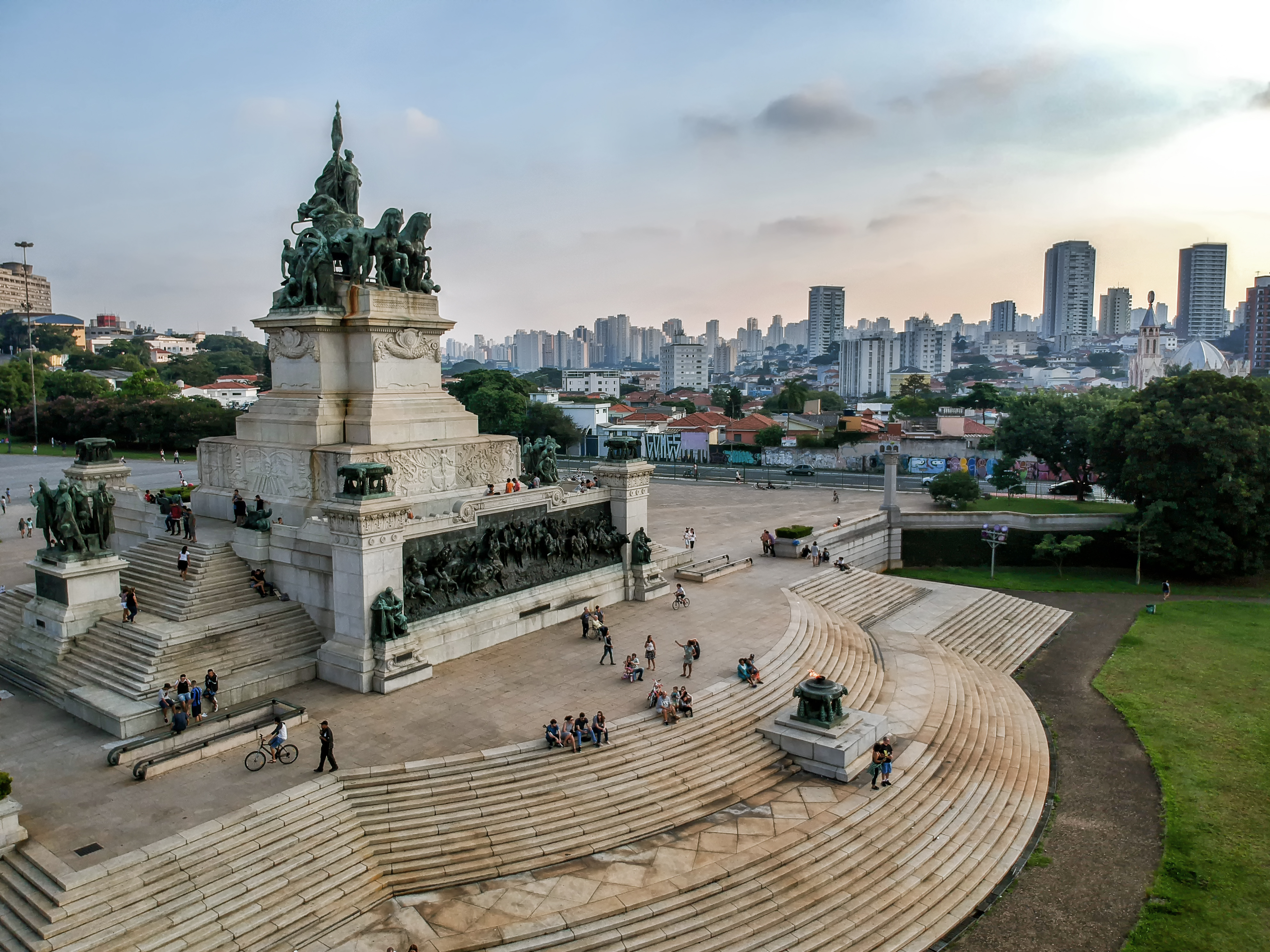
The Monument to Independence in Independence Park, located at the place where then-Prince Pedro proclaimed the Independence of Brazil

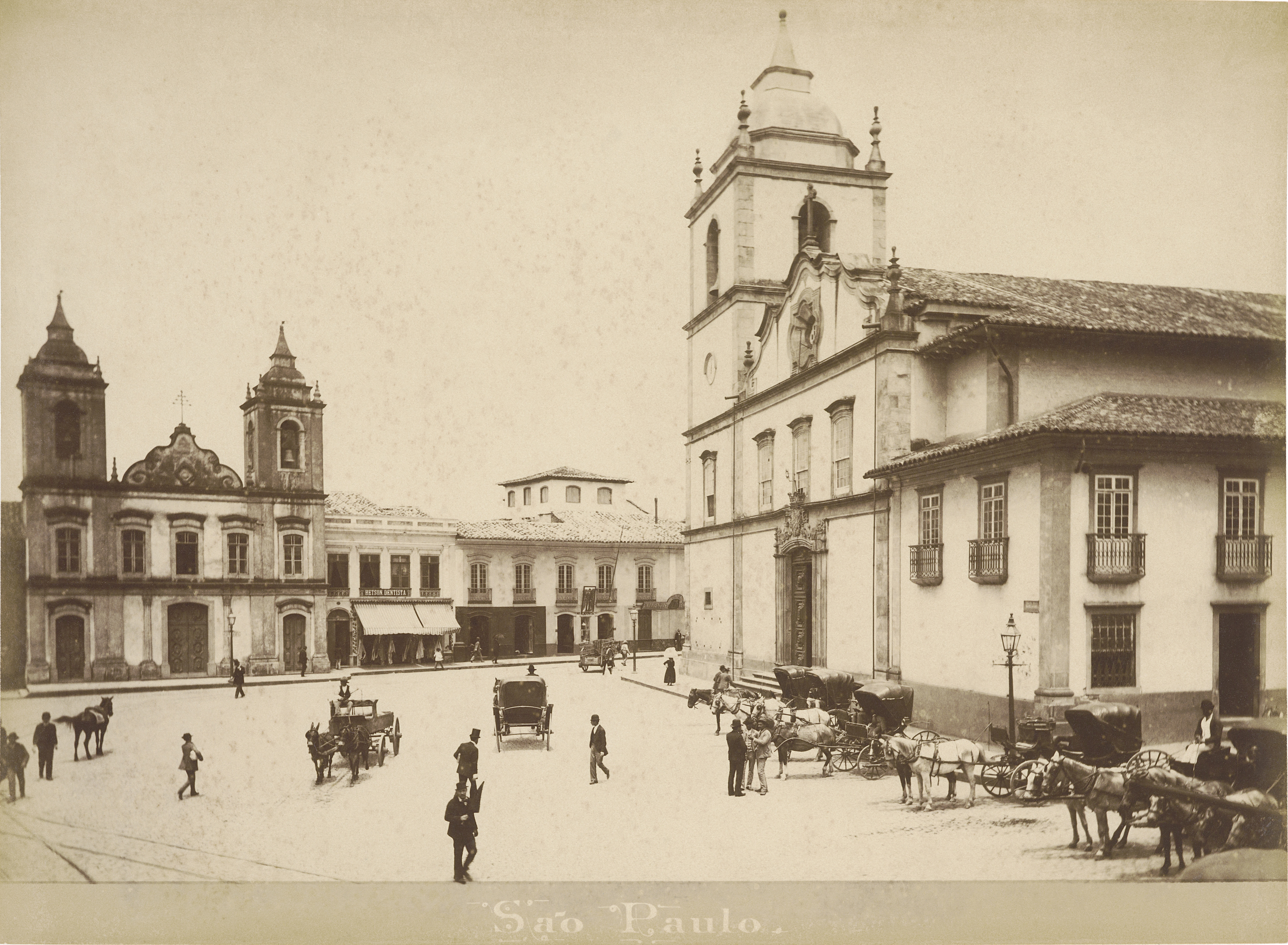
Cathedral Square of São Paulo in 1880, during the reign of Emperor Pedro II by Marc Ferrez

After Brazil became independent from Portugal in 1822, as declared by Emperor Pedro I where the Monument to the Independence of Brazil is located, he named São Paulo as an Imperial City. In 1827, a law school was founded at the Convent of São Francisco, today part of the University of São Paulo. The influx of students and teachers gave a new impetus to the city's growth, thanks to which the city became the Imperial City and Borough of Students of St. Paul of Piratininga.

The expansion of coffee production was a major factor in the growth of São Paulo, as it became the region's chief export crop and yielded good revenue. It was cultivated initially in the Paraíba Valley region in the East of the State of São Paulo, and later on in the regions of Campinas, Rio Claro, São Carlos and Ribeirão Preto.

From 1869 onward, São Paulo was connected to the port of Santos by the Estrada de Ferro Santos-Jundiaí (Santos-Jundiaí Railroad), nicknamed The Lady. By the late 19th century, several other railroads connected the interior to the state capital. São Paulo became the point of convergence of all railroads from the interior of the state. Coffee was the economic engine for major economic and population growth in the State of São Paulo.

In 1888, the "Golden Law" (Lei Áurea) was sanctioned by Isabel, Princess Imperial of Brazil, abolishing slavery in Brazil. Until then, enslaved had been the main source of labor in the coffee plantations. After abolition, and following governmental stimulus towards the increase of immigration, the province began to receive a large number of immigrants, largely Italians, Japanese and Portuguese peasants, many of whom settled in the capital. The region's first industries also began to emerge, providing jobs to the newcomers, especially those who had to learn Portuguese.

=== Old Republican period ===
By the time Brazil became a republic on 15 November 1889, coffee exports were still an important part of São Paulo's economy. São Paulo grew strong in the national political scene, taking turns with the also rich state of Minas Gerais in electing Brazilian presidents, an alliance that became known as "coffee and milk", given that Minas Gerais was famous for its dairy production. During this period, São Paulo went from regional center to national metropolis, reaching its first million inhabitants in 1928. Its greatest growth in this period was relative in the 1890s when it doubled its population. The height of the coffee period is represented by the construction of the second Luz Station (the present building) at the end of the 19th century and by the Paulista Avenue in 1900, where they built many mansions.

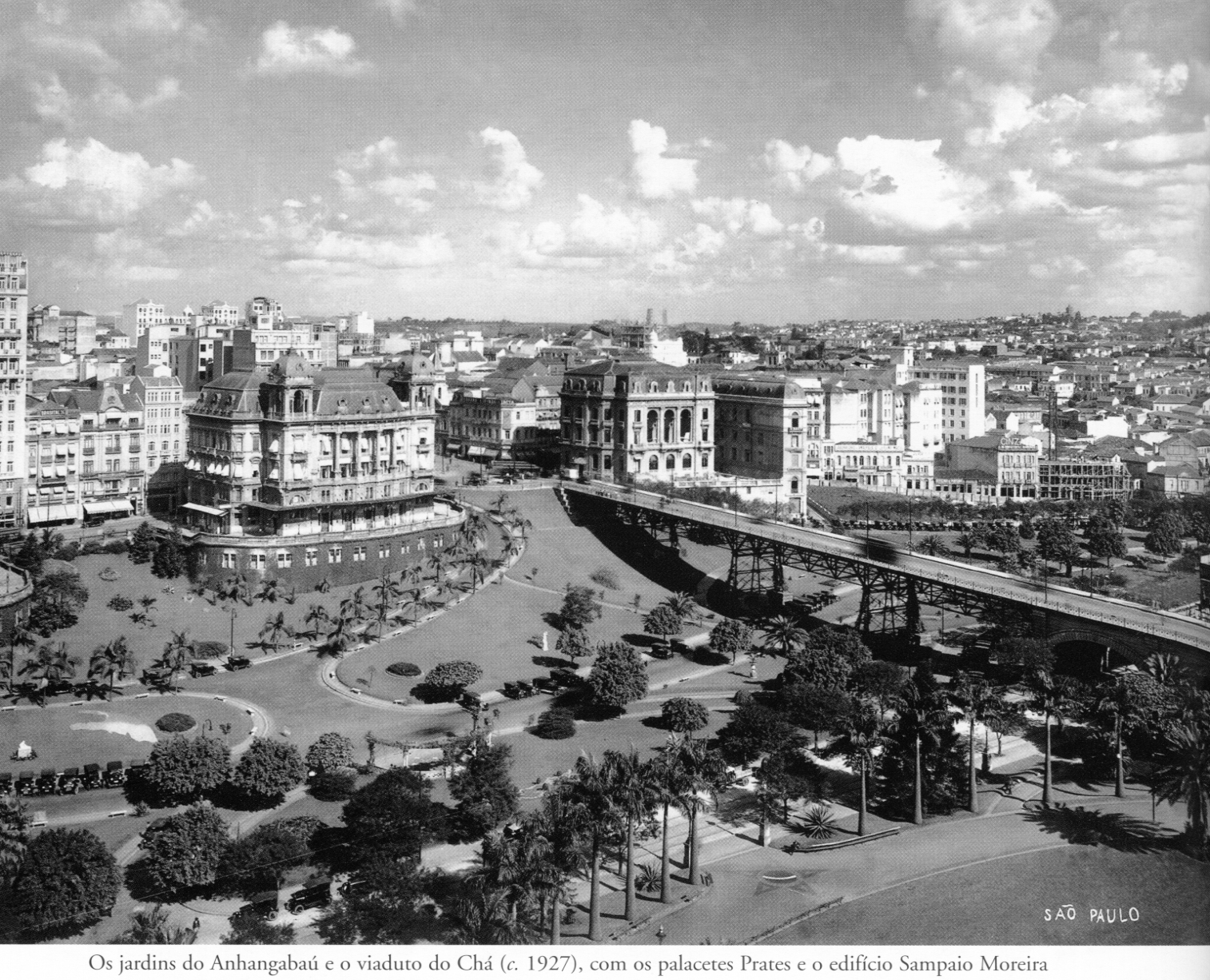
Viaduto do Chá and Anhangabaú Valley in the 1920s

The Industrial Revolution created an cycle that followed the coffee plantation model. By the hands of some industrious families, including many immigrants of Italian and Jewish origin, factories began to arise and São Paulo became known for its smoky, foggy air. The cultural scene followed modernist and naturalist tendencies in fashion at the beginning of the 20th century. Some examples of notable modernist artists are poets Mário de Andrade and Oswald de Andrade, artists Anita Malfatti, Tarsila do Amaral and Lasar Segall, and sculptor Victor Brecheret. The Modern Art Week of 1922 that took place at the Theatro Municipal was an event marked by avant-garde ideas and works of art. In 1929, São Paulo won its first skyscraper, the Martinelli Building.

At the beginning of the twentieth century, the valley of the Anhangabaú River was landscaped, and the region located on its left bank became known as Centro Novo, in the current district of the Republic. In the same period, the seat of the São Paulo government was transferred from the Pátio do Colégio to the Palácio dos Campos Elíseos, reflecting the city's expansion and modernisation movement.

The modifications made in the city by Antônio da Silva Prado, Baron of Duprat and Washington Luís, who governed from 1899 to 1919, contributed to the climate development of the city; some scholars consider that the entire city was demolished and rebuilt at that time. São Paulo's main economic activities derive from the services industry – factories are since long gone, and in came financial services institutions, law firms, consulting firms. Old factory buildings and warehouses still dot the landscape in areas such as Barra Funda and Brás.

In 1924 the city was the stage of the São Paulo Revolt, an armed conflict fought in working-class neighborhoods near central São Paulo that lasted 23 days, from 5 to 28 July, leaving hundreds dead and thousands injured. The confrontation between the federal troops of president Artur Bernardes against rebels of the Brazilian Army and the Public Force of São Paulo was classified by the federal government as a conspiracy, a mutiny and a "revolt against the Fatherland, without foundation, headed by disorderly members of the Brazilian Army". To face the rebels, the federal government launched an indiscriminate artillery bombardment against the city, which affected mostly civilian targets; as a result of the bombing, a third of São Paulo's 700,000 inhabitants fled the city. The revolt has been described as "the largest urban conflict in the history of Brazil".

=== 1932 revolution and contemporary era ===
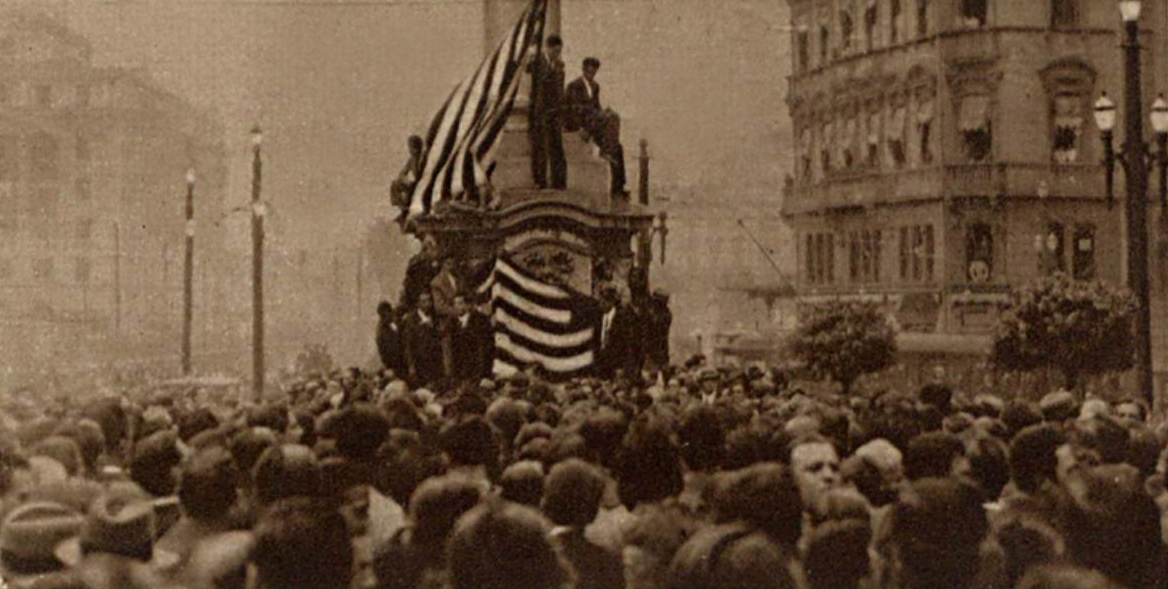
Demonstration in Patriarca Square shortly before the Constitutionalist Revolution of 1932

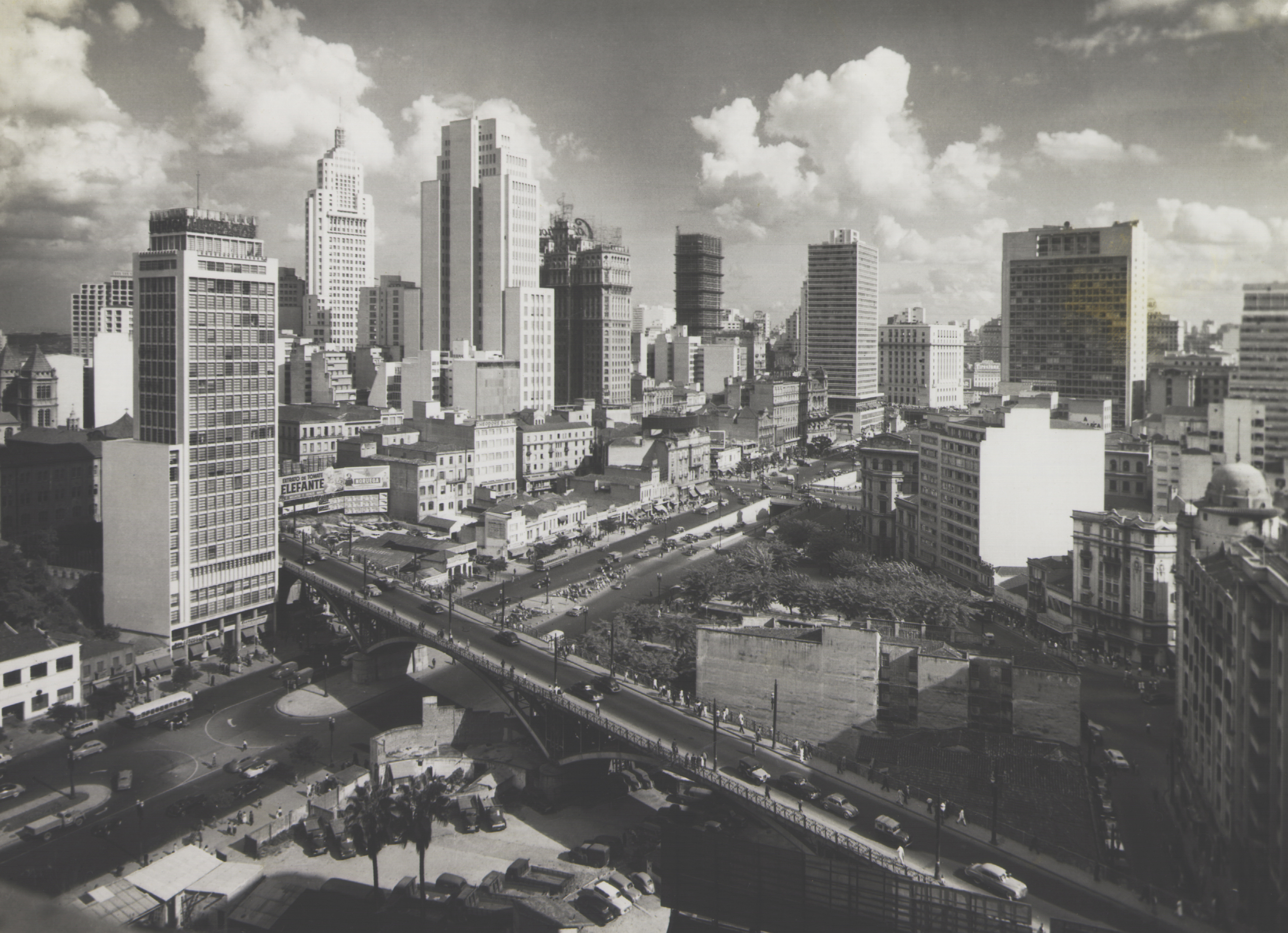
São Paulo in the 1960s, with the Martinelli, Altino Arantes and Mirante do Vale buildings

In 1932, São Paulo became the centre of the Constitutionalist Revolution, when the entire population engaged in the war against the "Provisional Government" of Getúlio Vargas. In 1934, with the reunion of some faculties created in the 19th century, the University of São Paulo (USP) was founded, today the largest in Brazil.

The first major project for industrial installation in the city was the industrial complex of Indústrias Matarazzo in Barra Funda. In the 1930s, the Jafet brothers, operating in the fabric business, Rodolfo Crespi, the Puglisi Carbone brothers and the Klabin family, who would found the first large cellulose industry in Brazil, the Klabin. Another major industrial boom occurred during the Second World War, due to the crisis in coffee farming in the 1930s and restrictions on international trade during the war, which resulted in the city having a very high economic growth rate that remained high in the post-war period.

In 1947, São Paulo gained its first paved highway: the Via Anchieta (built on the old route of José de Anchieta), connecting the capital to the coast of São Paulo. In the 1950s, São Paulo was known as "the city that never stop" and as "the fastest growing city in the world". São Paulo held a large celebration, in 1954, of the "Fourth Centenary" of the city's founding, when the Ibirapuera Park was inaugurated, many historical books are released and the source of the Tietê River in Salesópolis is discovered. With the transfer of part of the city's financial center, which was located in the historic center (in the region called the "Historic Triangle"), to Paulista Avenue, its mansions were, for the most part, replaced by large buildings.

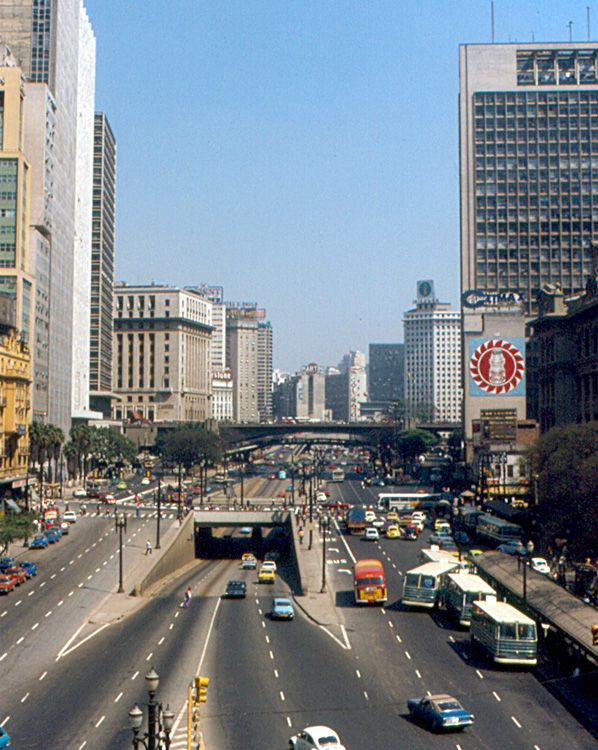
Prestes Maia Avenue in 1974

From the 1930s to the 1960s, the great entrepreneurs of São Paulo's development were mayor Francisco Prestes Maia and the governor Ademar de Barros, who was also mayor of São Paulo between 1957 and 1961. Prestes Maia designed and implemented, in the 1930s, the "Avenue Plan for the City of São Paulo", which overhauled São Paulo's traffic. These two rulers are also responsible for the two biggest urban interventions, after the Avenues Plan, which changed São Paulo: the rectification of the Tietê river with the construction of its banks and the São Paulo Metro: on February 13, 1963, governor Ademar de Barros and mayor Prestes Maia created study commissions (state and municipal) to prepare the basic project for the São Paulo Metro, and allocated their first funds to the Metro.

At the beginning of the 1960s, São Paulo had four million inhabitants. Construction of the metro began in 1968, under the administration of Mayor José Vicente de Faria Lima, and the commercial operation started on September 14, 1974. In 2016 the system had a network 71.5 km long and 64 stations spread across five lines. That year, 1.1 billion passengers were transported by the system.

At the end of the 20th century and beginning of the 21st century, São Paulo became the main financial hub in South America and one of the most populous cities in the world. As the most influential Brazilian city on the global stage, São Paulo is currently classified as an alpha global city. The metropolis has one of the largest GDP in the world, representing, alone, 11% of all Brazilian GDP, and is also responsible for one third of the Brazilian scientific production.

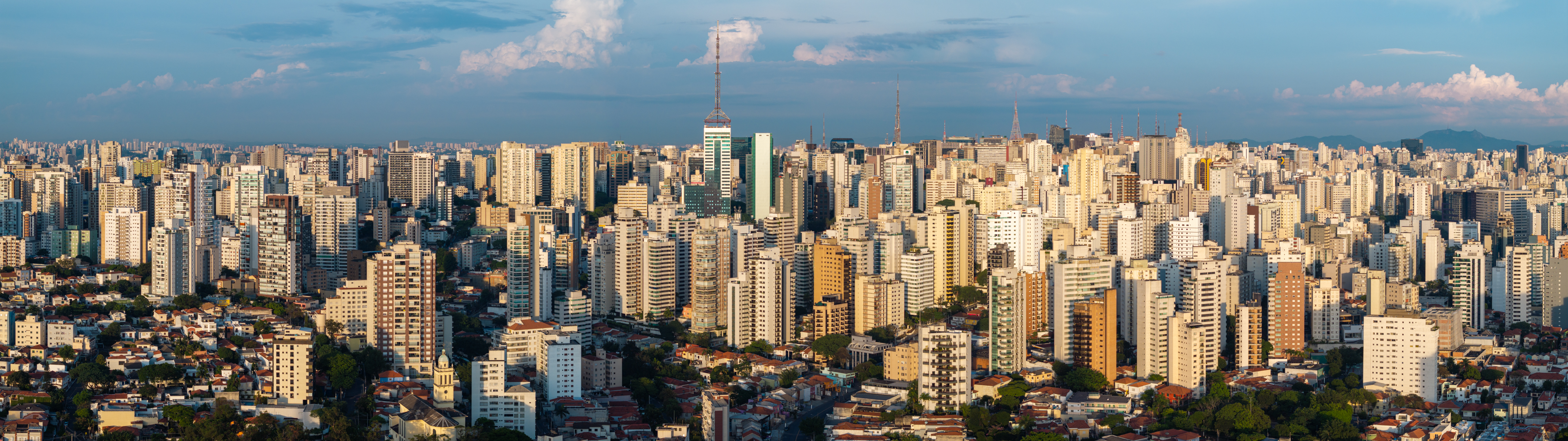
Skyline of São Paulo in 2024 from Aclimação. In the background, the buildings of Avenida Paulista, as well as Pico do Jaraguá to the right of the photograph.

== Geography ==
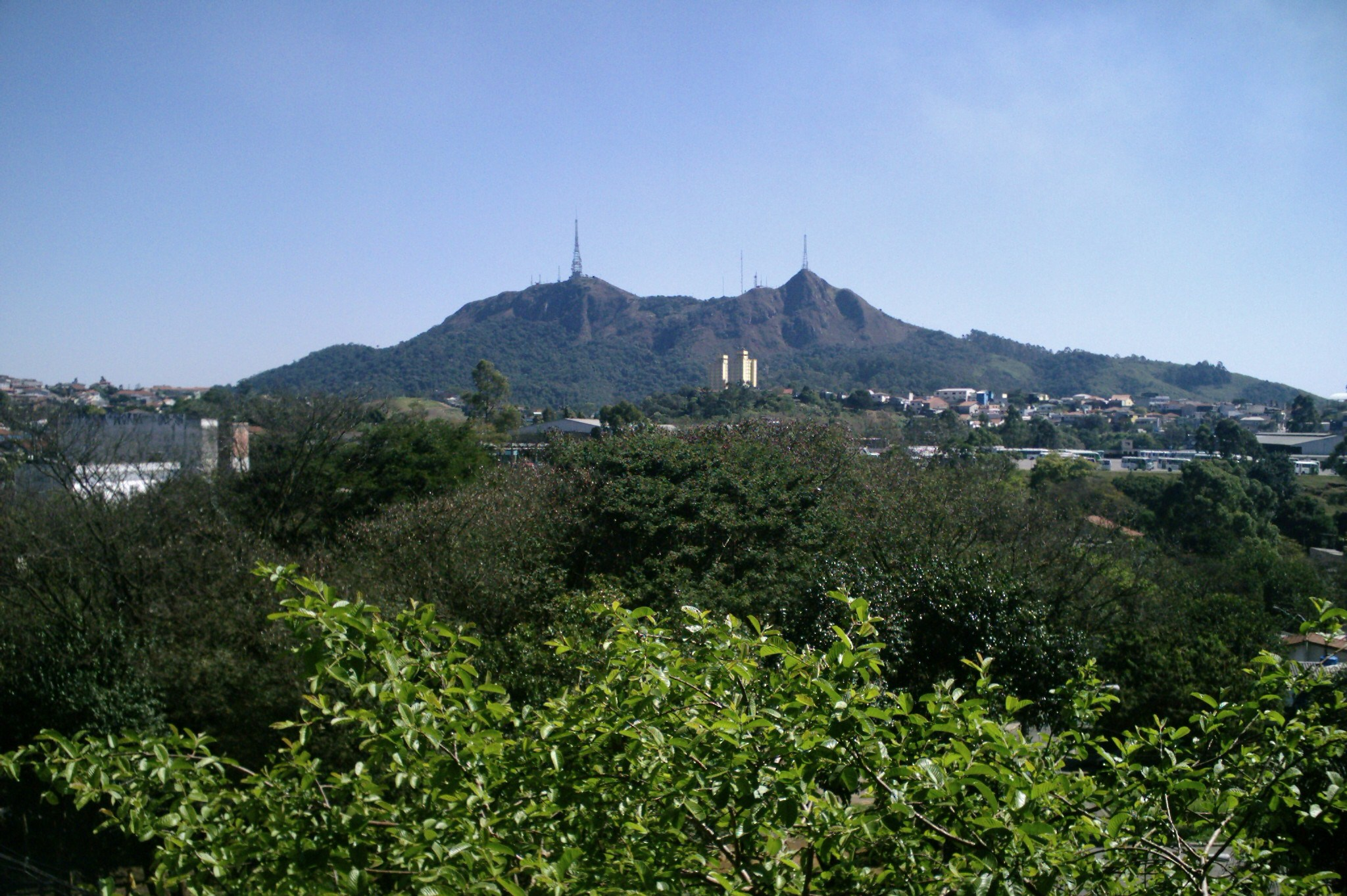
Jaraguá Peak is the highest point in the city, at 1,135 meters (3,724 ft).

Location on a map of municipalities of the state of São Paulo

São Paulo is the capital of the most populous state in Brazil, São Paulo, located at latitude 23°33'01'' south and longitude 46°38'02'' west. The total area of the municipality is 1,521.11 square kilometres (587.30 sq mi), according to the Brazilian Institute of Geography and Statistics (IBGE), being the ninth largest in the state in terms of territorial extension. Of the entire area of the municipality, 949,611 square kilometres (366,647 sq mi) are urban areas (2015), being the largest urban area in the country. The urban organisation, as in the whole colony, was centred, administratively and ecclesiastically, in parishes. Each parish was centred on a chapel.

The city is on a plateau placed beyond the Serra do Mar (Portuguese for "Sea Range" or "Coastal Range"), itself a component of the vast region known as the Brazilian Highlands, with an average elevation of around 799 meters (2,621 ft) above sea level, although being at a distance of only about 70 km (43 mi) from the Atlantic Ocean. The distance is covered by two highways, the Anchieta and the Imigrantes, (see "Transportation" below) that roll down the range, leading to the port city of Santos and the beach resort of Guarujá. Rolling terrain prevails within the urbanized areas of São Paulo except in its northern area, where the Serra da Cantareira Range reaches a higher elevation and a sizable remnant of the Atlantic Rain Forest. The region is seismically stable and no significant activity has ever been recorded.

=== Hydrography ===
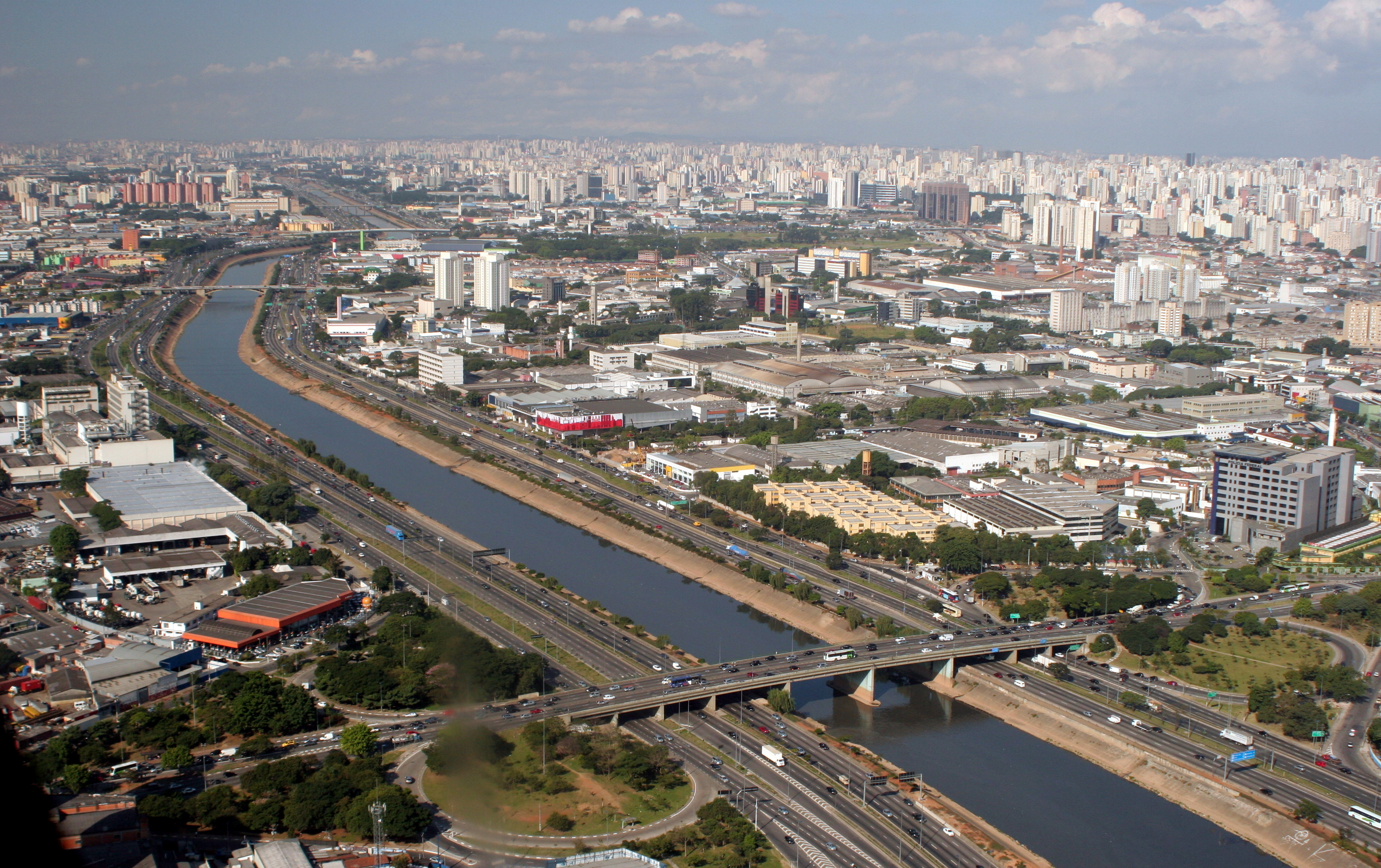
Tietê River, with the Marginal Tietê highway

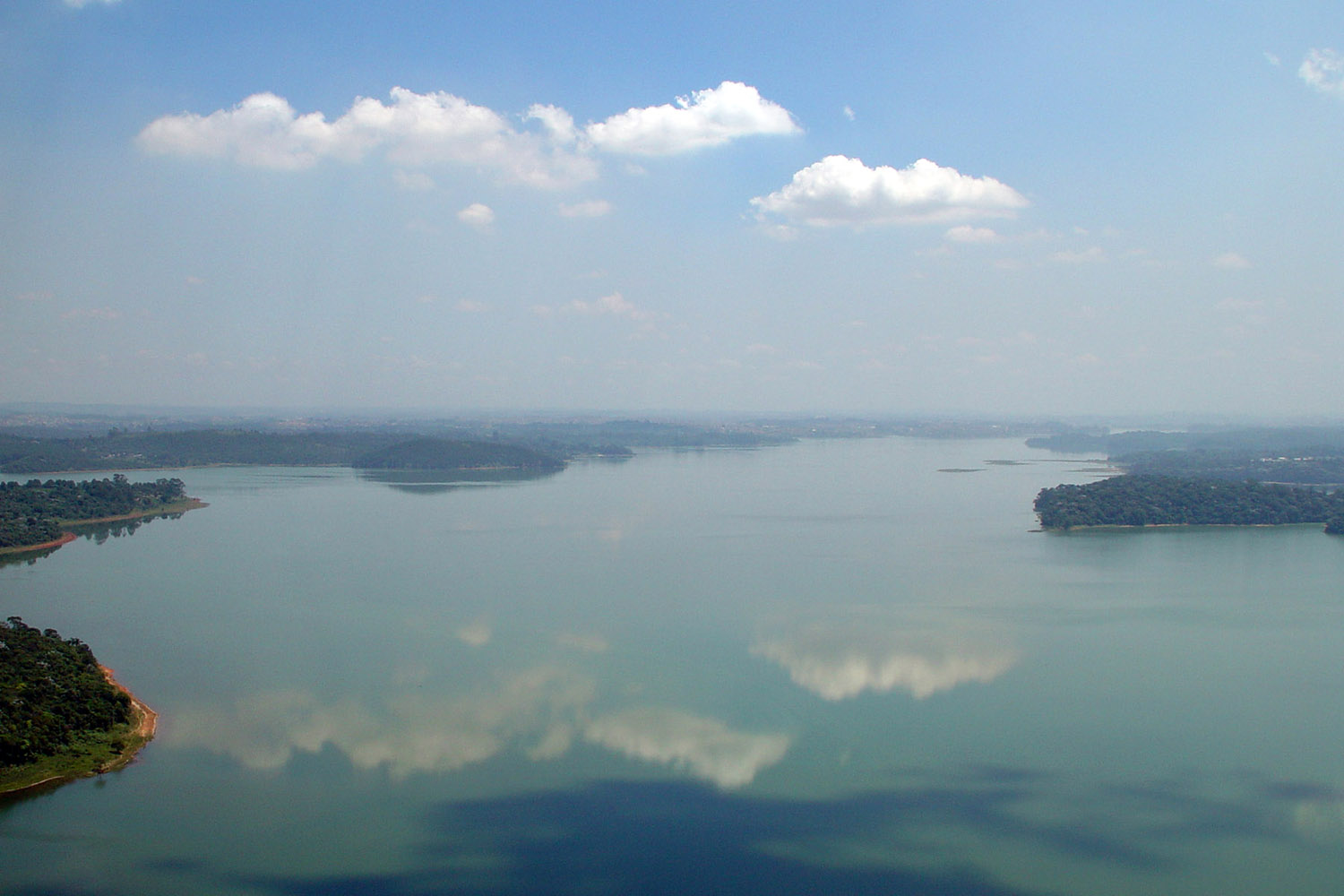
Billings Reservoir

The Tietê River and its tributary, the Pinheiros River, were once important sources of fresh water and leisure for São Paulo. However, heavy industrial effluents and wastewater discharges in the later 20th century caused the rivers to become heavily polluted. A substantial clean-up program for both rivers is underway. Neither river is navigable in the stretch that flows through the city, although water transportation becomes increasingly important on the Tietê river further downstream (near river Paraná), as the river is part of the River Plate basin.

No large natural lakes exist in the region, but the Billings and Guarapiranga reservoirs in the city's southern outskirts are used for power generation, water storage and leisure activities, such as sailing. The original flora consisted mainly of broadleaf evergreens. Non-native species are common, as the mild climate and abundant rainfall permit a multitude of subtropical and temperate plants to be cultivated, especially the ubiquitous eucalyptus.

The north of the municipality contains part of the 7,917 hectares (19,560 acres) Cantareira State Park, created in 1962, which protects a large part of the metropolitan São Paulo water supply. In 2015, São Paulo experienced a major drought, which led several cities in the state to start a rationing system.

=== Parks and biodiversity ===
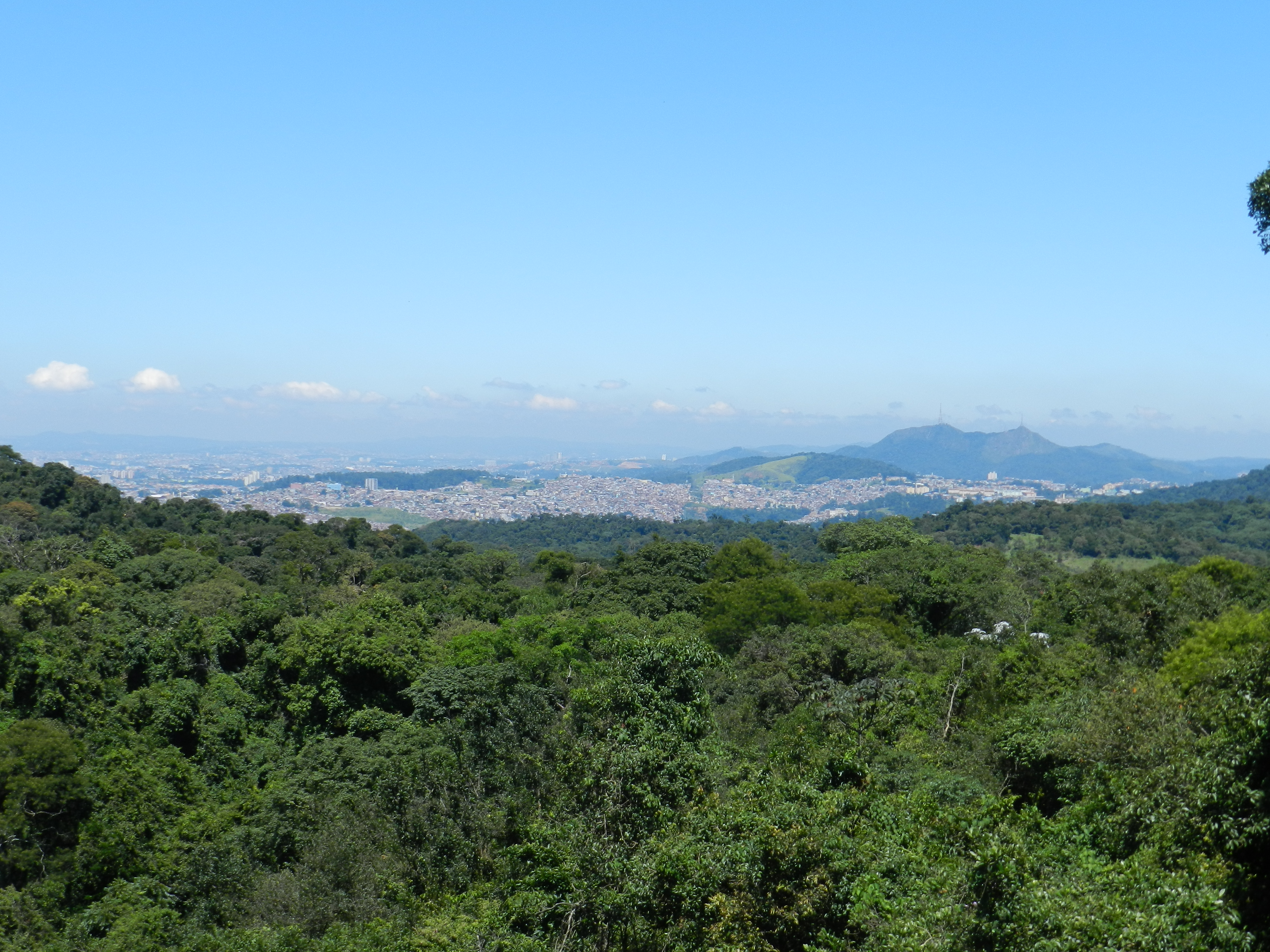
Cantareira State Park, part of the São Paulo Green Belt Biosphere Reserve

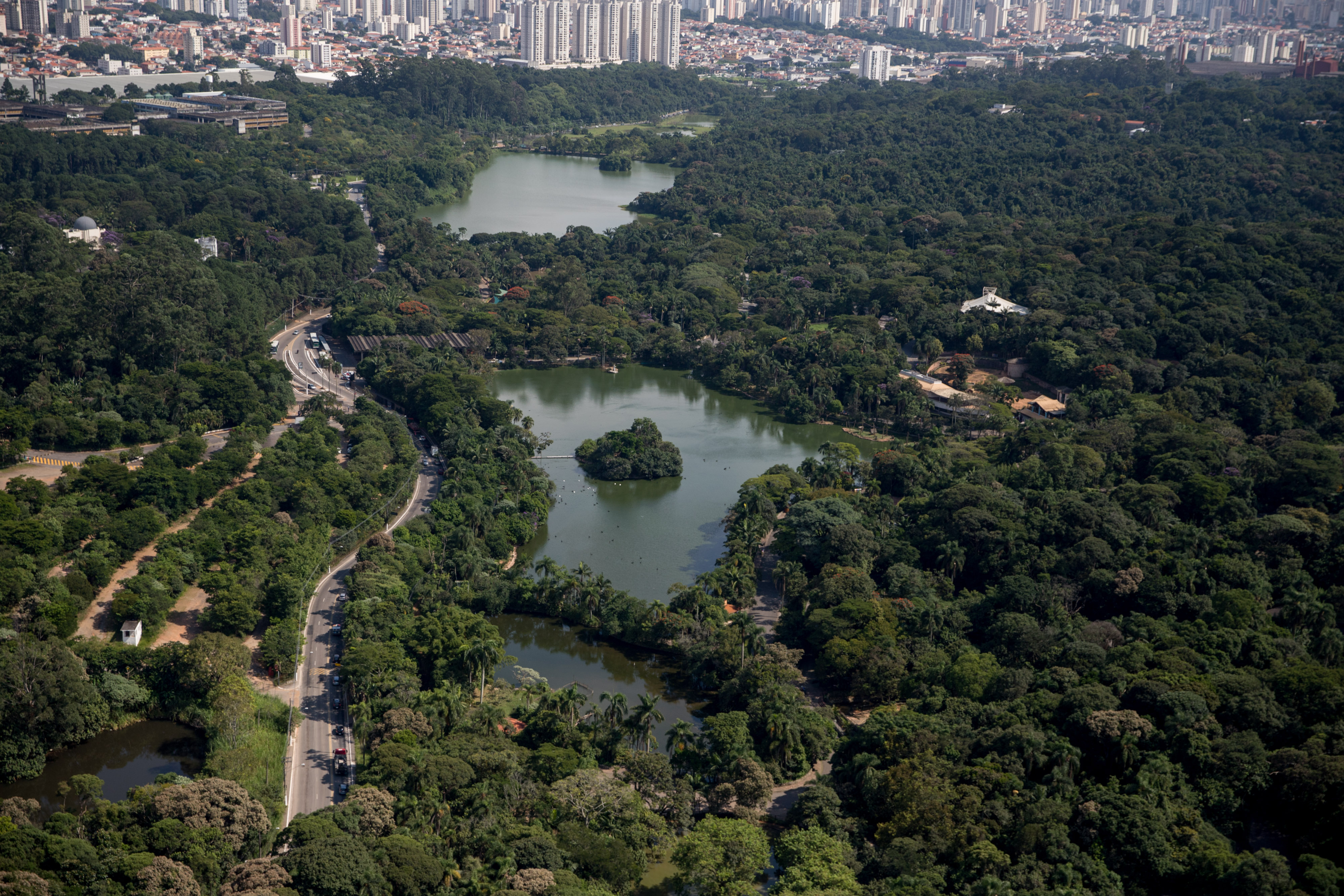
São Paulo Zoo in the Fontes do Ipiranga Biological Reserve

São Paulo is located in an ecotone area between 3 biomes: mixed ombrophilous forest, dense ombrophilous forest and cerrado; the latter had some plant species native to the pampas in the city. There were several species typical of both biomes, among them we can mention: araucarias, pitangueiras, cambucís, ipês, jabuticabeiras, queen palms, muricís-do-campo, etc.

In 2010, São Paulo had 62 municipal and state parks, such as the Cantareira State Park, part of the São Paulo Green Belt Biosphere Reserve and home to one of the largest urban forests on the planet with 7,900 hectares (20,000 acres) of extension, the Fontes do Ipiranga State Park, the Ibirapuera Park, the Tietê Ecological Park, the Capivari-Monos Environmental Protection Area, the Serra do Mar State Park, Villa-Lobos State Park, People's Park, and the Jaraguá State Park, listed as a World Heritage Site by UNESCO in 1994.

In 2009, São Paulo had 2,300 hectares (5,700 acres) of green area, less than 1.5% of the city's area and below the 12 square metres (130 sq ft) per inhabitant recommended by the WHO. About 21% of the municipality's area is covered by green areas, including ecological reserves (2010 data).

In the municipality it is possible to observe forest birds that usually appear in the spring, due to the belt of native forest that still surrounds the metropolitan region. Species such as the rufous-bellied thrush, golden-chevroned tanager, great kiskadee and hummingbird are the most common. Despite the intense pollution, the main rivers of the city, the Tietê and the Pinheiros, shelter several species of animals such as capybaras, hawks, southern lapwings, herons and nutrias. Other species found in the municipality are the gray brocket, howler monkey, green-billed toucan and the Amazonian umbrellabird.

=== Environment ===
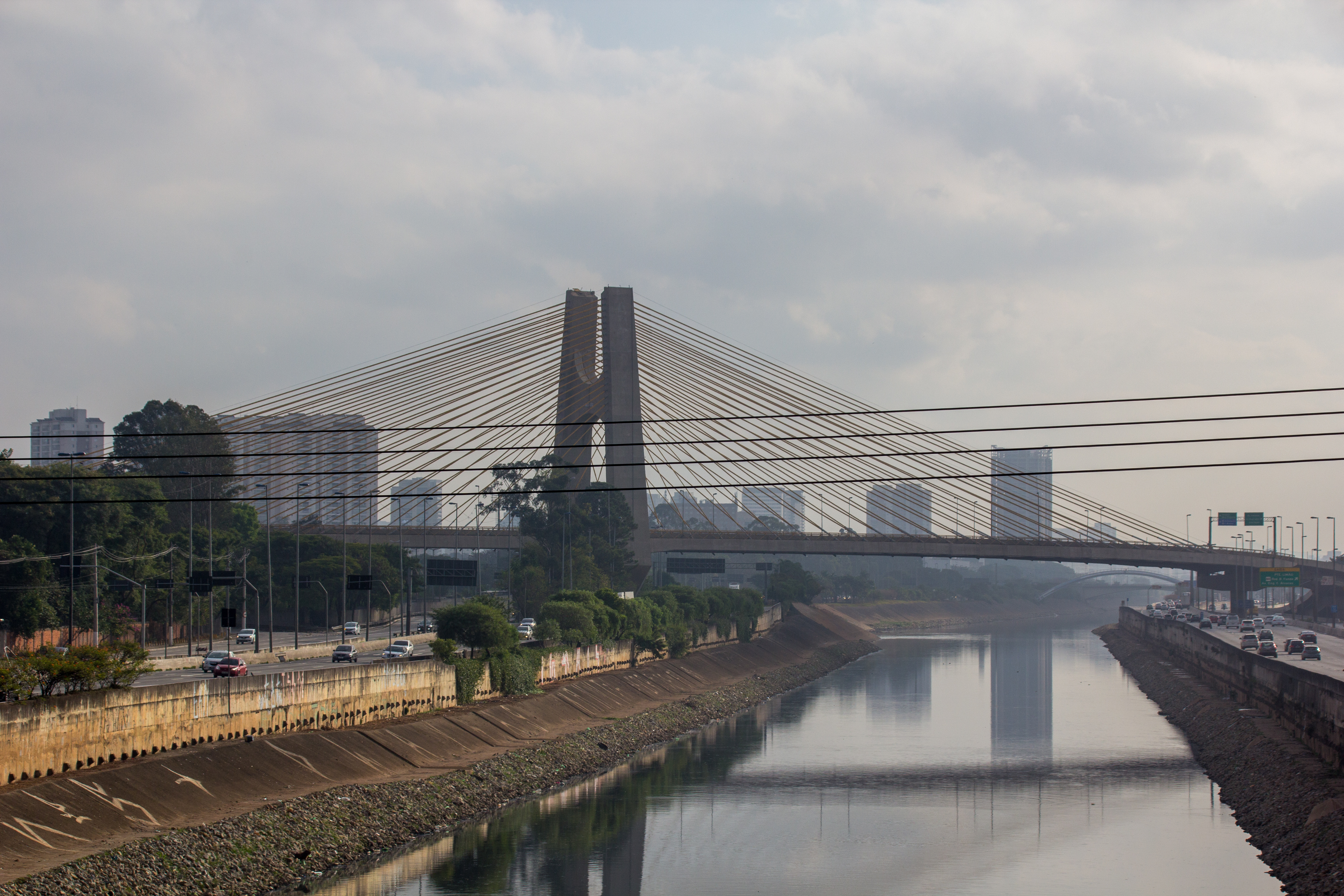
Tietê River, one of the most polluted in the city

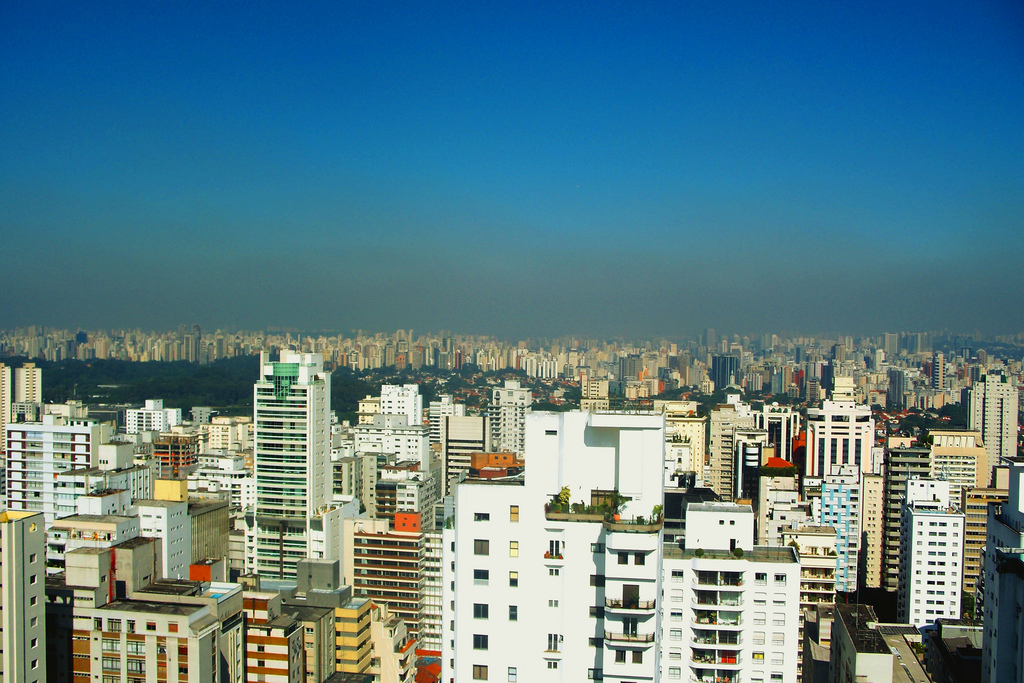
Smog seen on the horizon of the Ibirapuera region

Air pollution in some districts of the city exceeds local standards, mainly due to car traffic. The WHO sets a limit of 20 micrograms of particulate matter per cubic meter of air as a safe annual average. In an assessment carried out by the WHO among over a thousand cities around the world in 2011, the city of São Paulo was ranked 268th among the most polluted, with an average rate of 38 micrograms per cubic meter, a rate well above the WHO-imposed limit, but lower than in other Brazilian cities, such as Rio de Janeiro (64 micrograms per cubic meter). A 2013 study found that air pollution in the city causes more deaths than traffic accidents.

The stretch of the Tietê River that runs through the city is the most polluted river in Brazil. In 1992, the Tietê Project began, with the aim to clean up the river by 2005. 8.8 billion reais was spent on the failed project. In 2019, the Novo Rio Pinheiros Project began, under the administration of João Doria, with the aim to reduce sewage discharged into the Tietê's tributary, the Pinheiros River.

The problem of balanced water supply for the city – and for the metropolis, in general – is also a worrying issue: São Paulo has few sources of water in its own perimeter, having to seek it in distant hydrographic basins. The problem of water pollution is also aggravated by the irregular occupation of watershed areas, caused by urban expansion, driven by the difficulty of access to land and housing in central areas by the low-income population and associated with real estate speculation and precariousness in new subdivisions. With this, there is also an overvaluation of individual transport over public transport – leading to the current rate of more than one vehicle for every two inhabitants and aggravating the problem of environmental pollution.

=== Climate ===
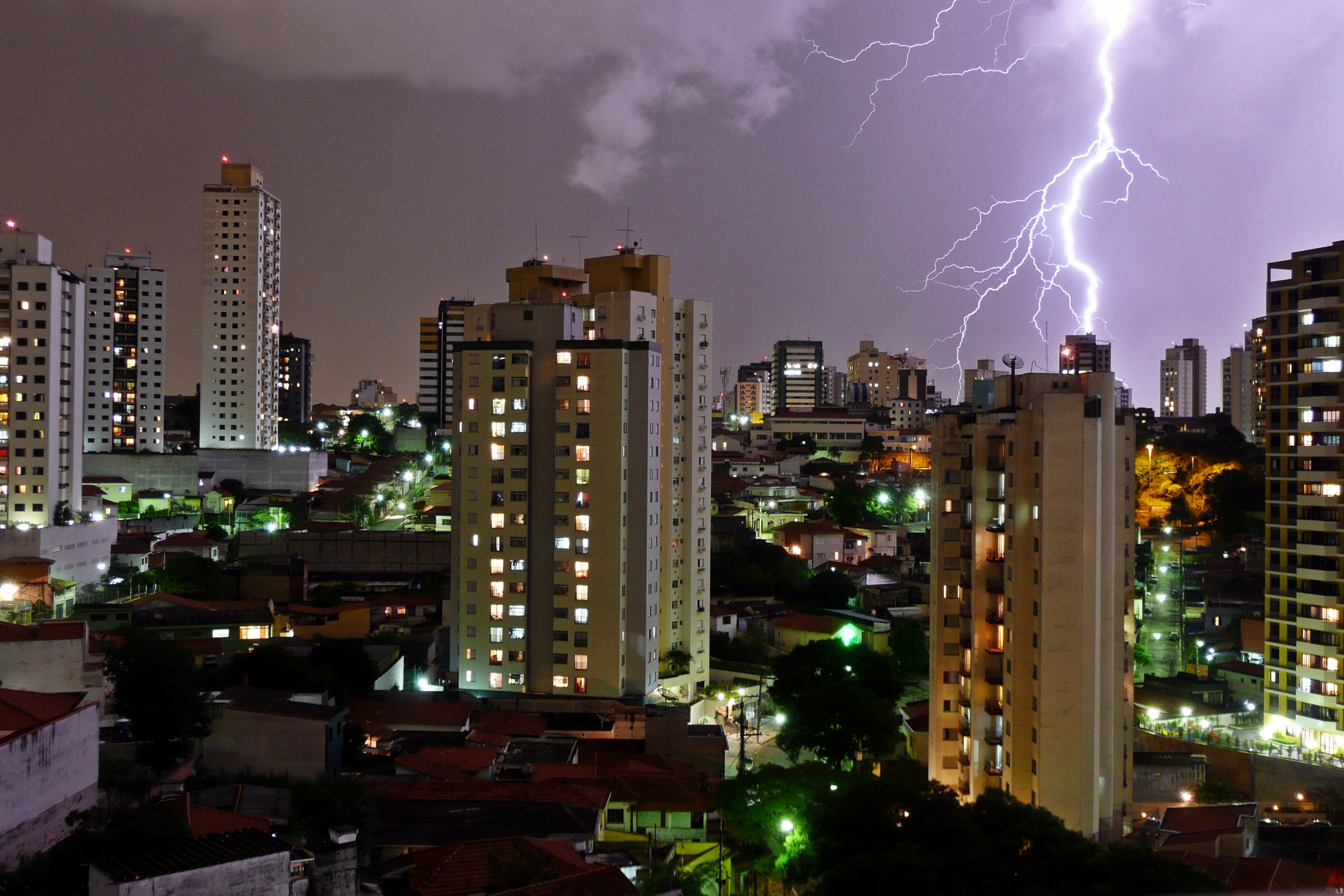
Heavy rain and lightning in São Paulo, which has one of the largest number of lightning incidents amongst Brazilian state capitals

Like much of Brazil's Southeast and South regions, the city of São Paulo has a humid subtropical climate (Köppen: Cfa, Trewartha: Cfal).The average precipitation of the driest month —in winter— is higher than one tenth of the average precipitation of the wettest month, in summer; so, the climate of the city of São Paulo is not Cwa, as seen in many Brazilian sources, like the University of São Paulo. In summer (January through March), the mean low temperature is about 19 °C (66 °F) and the mean high temperature is near 28 °C (82 °F). In winter, temperatures tend to range between 12 and 22 °C (54 and 72 °F). The record high temperature was 38.4 °C (101.1 °F) on 17 October 2014 and the lowest −3.2 °C (26.2 °F) on 25 June 1918. The highest accumulated rainfall in 24 hours was 151.8 mm (5.98 in) on December 21, 1988, followed by 144.1 mm (5.67 in) on January 25, 2025, and 140.4 mm (5.53 in) on May 25, 2005.

The Tropic of Capricorn, at about 23°27' S, passes through north of São Paulo and roughly marks the boundary between the tropical and temperate areas of South America. Because of its elevation, São Paulo has a more temperate climate. The summer is hot and rainy. Autumn and spring are transitional seasons. Winter is mild, but still the coldest season, with cloudiness around town and frequent polar air masses. Frosts occur sporadically in regions further away from the center, in some winters throughout the city.

Rainfall is abundant, annually averaging 1,658 millimeters (65.3 in). It is especially common in the warmer months averaging 292 millimeters (11.5 in) in January and decreases in winter, averaging 32 millimeters (1.3 in). Neither São Paulo nor the nearby coast has ever been hit by a tropical cyclone and tornadic activity is uncommon. During late winter, especially August, the city experiences the phenomenon known as "veranico" or "verãozinho" ("little summer"), which consists of hot and dry weather, sometimes reaching temperatures well above 28 °C (82 °F).

Relatively cool summer days are fairly common when persistent winds blow from the ocean, with daily highs sometimes remaining below 20 °C (68 °F) and lows often falling below 15 °C (59 °F). Conversely, spring and summer can become extremely hot during heat waves, with temperatures reaching around 34 °C (93 °F). In areas with a higher density of skyscrapers and less tree cover, such as Paulista Avenue, temperatures can feel as high as 39 °C (102 °F). During the summer of 2014, São Paulo experienced a heat wave lasting nearly four weeks, with temperatures exceeding 30 °C (86 °F) and peaking at 36 °C (97 °F). Driven in part by deforestation, groundwater pollution, and climate change, the city is increasingly susceptible to drought and water scarcity.

Climate data for São Paulo (Mirante de Santana), elevation 785 m (2,575 ft), (1991–2020 normals, extremes 1943–present)
Month	Jan	Feb	Mar	Apr	May	Jun	Jul	Aug	Sep	Oct	Nov	Dec	Year
Record high °C (°F)	37.0 (98.6)	36.5 (97.7)	34.8 (94.6)	33.4 (92.1)	32.8 (91.0)	28.8 (83.8)	30.2 (86.4)	33.0 (91.4)	37.1 (98.8)	38.4 (101.1)	37.7 (99.9)	37.2 (99.0)	38.4 (101.1)
Mean daily maximum °C (°F)	28.6 (83.5)	29.0 (84.2)	28.0 (82.4)	26.6 (79.9)	23.4 (74.1)	22.9 (73.2)	22.9 (73.2)	24.5 (76.1)	25.2 (77.4)	26.5 (79.7)	26.9 (80.4)	28.3 (82.9)	26.1 (79.0)
Daily mean °C (°F)	23.1 (73.6)	22.5 (72.5)	22.5 (72.5)	21.2 (70.2)	18.4 (65.1)	17.0 (62.6)	16.3 (61.3)	18.1 (64.6)	19.1 (66.4)	20.5 (68.9)	21.2 (70.2)	22.3 (72.1)	20.2 (68.3)
Mean daily minimum °C (°F)	19.4 (66.9)	19.6 (67.3)	18.9 (66.0)	17.5 (63.5)	14.7 (58.5)	13.5 (56.3)	12.8 (55.0)	13.3 (55.9)	14.9 (58.8)	16.5 (61.7)	17.3 (63.1)	18.7 (65.7)	16.4 (61.5)
Record low °C (°F)	10.2 (50.4)	11.1 (52.0)	11.0 (51.8)	6.0 (42.8)	3.7 (38.7)	1.0 (33.8)	0.4 (32.7)	−2.1 (28.2)	2.2 (36.0)	4.3 (39.7)	7.0 (44.6)	9.4 (48.9)	−2.1 (28.2)
Average precipitation mm (inches)	292.1 (11.50)	257.7 (10.15)	229.1 (9.02)	87.0 (3.43)	66.3 (2.61)	59.7 (2.35)	48.4 (1.91)	32.3 (1.27)	83.3 (3.28)	127.2 (5.01)	143.9 (5.67)	231.3 (9.11)	1,658.3 (65.29)
Average precipitation days (≥ 1.0 mm)	17	14	13	6	6	5	4	4	7	10	11	13	110
Average relative humidity (%)	76.9	75.0	76.6	74.6	75.0	73.5	70.8	68.2	71.3	73.7	73.7	73.9	73.6
Average dew point °C (°F)	18.9 (66.0)	18.9 (66.0)	18.5 (65.3)	16.8 (62.2)	14.3 (57.7)	13.1 (55.6)	12.3 (54.1)	12.4 (54.3)	13.9 (57.0)	15.8 (60.4)	16.6 (61.9)	18.0 (64.4)	15.8 (60.4)
Mean monthly sunshine hours	139.1	153.5	161.6	169.3	167.6	160.0	169.0	173.1	144.5	157.9	152.8	145.1	1,893.5
Average ultraviolet index	12	12	12	9	6	5	5	7	9	11	12	12	9
Source: Instituto Nacional de Meteorologia (sun 1981–2010; Dew Point)

Climate data for São Paulo (Horto Florestal, 1961–1990 normals)
Month	Jan	Feb	Mar	Apr	May	Jun	Jul	Aug	Sep	Oct	Nov	Dec	Year
Record high °C (°F)	34.6 (94.3)	35.8 (96.4)	33.4 (92.1)	32.0 (89.6)	29.5 (85.1)	29.4 (84.9)	29.0 (84.2)	33.2 (91.8)	35.2 (95.4)	34.3 (93.7)	34.6 (94.3)	33.9 (93.0)	35.8 (96.4)
Mean daily maximum °C (°F)	27.0 (80.6)	27.8 (82.0)	27.3 (81.1)	24.9 (76.8)	23.0 (73.4)	22.0 (71.6)	22.0 (71.6)	23.7 (74.7)	24.5 (76.1)	24.7 (76.5)	25.7 (78.3)	26.3 (79.3)	24.9 (76.8)
Daily mean °C (°F)	21.2 (70.2)	21.6 (70.9)	21.1 (70.0)	18.8 (65.8)	16.7 (62.1)	15.6 (60.1)	15.1 (59.2)	16.4 (61.5)	17.6 (63.7)	18.5 (65.3)	19.5 (67.1)	20.6 (69.1)	18.6 (65.4)
Mean daily minimum °C (°F)	16.6 (61.9)	16.9 (62.4)	16.3 (61.3)	14.1 (57.4)	11.7 (53.1)	10.5 (50.9)	9.7 (49.5)	10.9 (51.6)	12.4 (54.3)	13.7 (56.7)	14.6 (58.3)	16.0 (60.8)	13.6 (56.5)
Record low °C (°F)	10.3 (50.5)	11.1 (52.0)	9.6 (49.3)	3.5 (38.3)	0.2 (32.4)	−1.8 (28.8)	0.2 (32.4)	0.4 (32.7)	3.0 (37.4)	5.7 (42.3)	7.0 (44.6)	9.2 (48.6)	−1.8 (28.8)
Average rainfall mm (inches)	245.6 (9.67)	243.8 (9.60)	159.2 (6.27)	76.0 (2.99)	59.7 (2.35)	58.7 (2.31)	53.1 (2.09)	39.9 (1.57)	76.2 (3.00)	162.7 (6.41)	195.7 (7.70)	220.6 (8.69)	1,591.3 (62.65)
Average rainy days (≥ 1 mm)	16	14	11	7	6	5	5	4	7	11	12	15	113
Average relative humidity (%)	81.0	80.4	80.3	81.2	80.5	79.2	77.4	74.6	76.2	79.3	79.4	80.4	79.2
Source: Brazilian National Institute of Meteorology (INMET).

== Demographics ==
Historical population
Year	Pop.	±%
1872	31,385	—
1890	64,934	+106.9%
1900	239,820	+269.3%
1920	579,033	+141.4%
1940	1,326,261	+129.0%
1950	2,198,096	+65.7%
1960	3,781,446	+72.0%
1970	5,924,615	+56.7%
1980	8,493,226	+43.4%
1991	9,646,185	+13.6%
2000	10,434,252	+8.2%
2010	11,253,503	+7.9%
2022	11,451,245	+1.8%

São Paulo's population has grown rapidly. In 1960, it surpassed Rio de Janeiro as the most populous city in Brazil. By that time, the Greater São Paulo area had extended beyond the boundaries of the municipality proper into surrounding municipalities, making it a metropolitan area with a population of 4.6 million. Population growth has continued since 1960, although the rate of growth has slowed.

In 2013, São Paulo was the most populous city in Brazil and in South America. According to the 2010 IBGE Census, there were 11,244,369 people residing in the city of São Paulo. Portuguese remains the most widely spoken language and São Paulo is the largest city in the Portuguese speaking world.

In 2010, the city had 2,146,077 opposite-sex couples and 7,532 same-sex couples. The population of São Paulo was 52.6% female and 47.4% male. The 2022 census found 6,214,422 White people (54.3%), 3,820,326 Pardo (multiracial) people (33.4%), 1,160,073 Black people (10.1%), 238,603 Asian people (2.1%) and 17,727 Amerindian people (0.2%).

=== Immigration and migration ===
Race and ethnicity in São Paulo
Ethnicity	Percentage
White	54.3%
Mixed	33.4%
Black	10.1%
Asian	2.1%
Amerindian	0.2%

São Paulo is considered the most multicultural city in Brazil. From 1870 to 2010, approximately 2.3 million immigrants arrived in the state, from all parts of the world. The Italian community is one of the strongest, with a presence throughout the city. Of the 12 million inhabitants of São Paulo, 50% (5 million people) have full or partial Italian ancestry. São Paulo has more descendants of Italians than any Italian city (the largest city of Italy is Rome, with 2.8 million inhabitants).

The main groups, considering all the metropolitan area, are: 6 million people of Portuguese descent, 5 million people of Italian descent, 1.7 million people of African descent, 1 million people of Arab descent, 665,000 people of Japanese descent, 400,000 people of German descent, 250,000 people of French descent, 150,000 people of Greek descent, 120,000 people of Chinese descent, 120,000–300,000 Bolivian immigrants, 50,000 people of Korean descent, and 80,000 Jews.

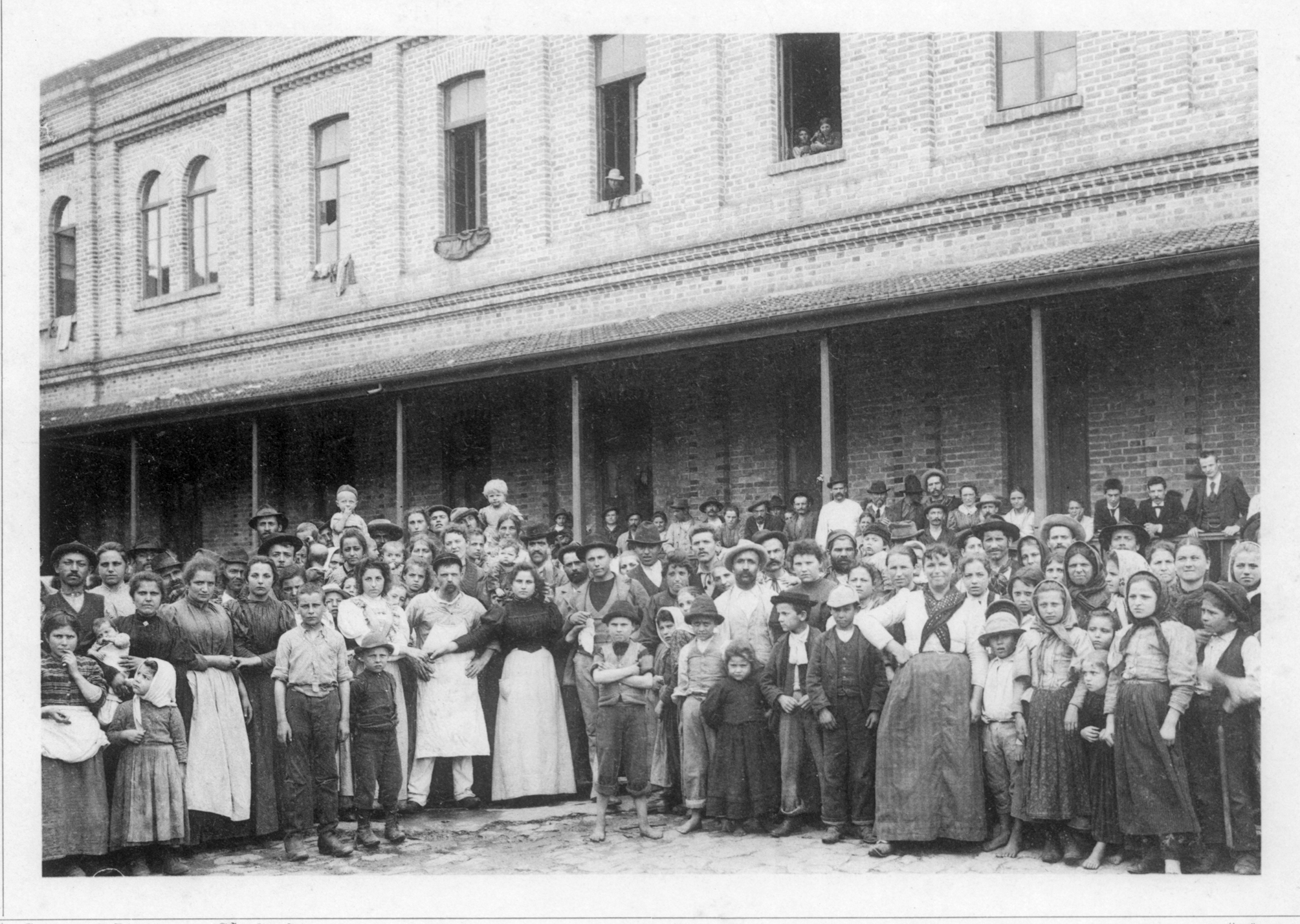
Italian immigrants in the Immigrant Inn, c. 1890

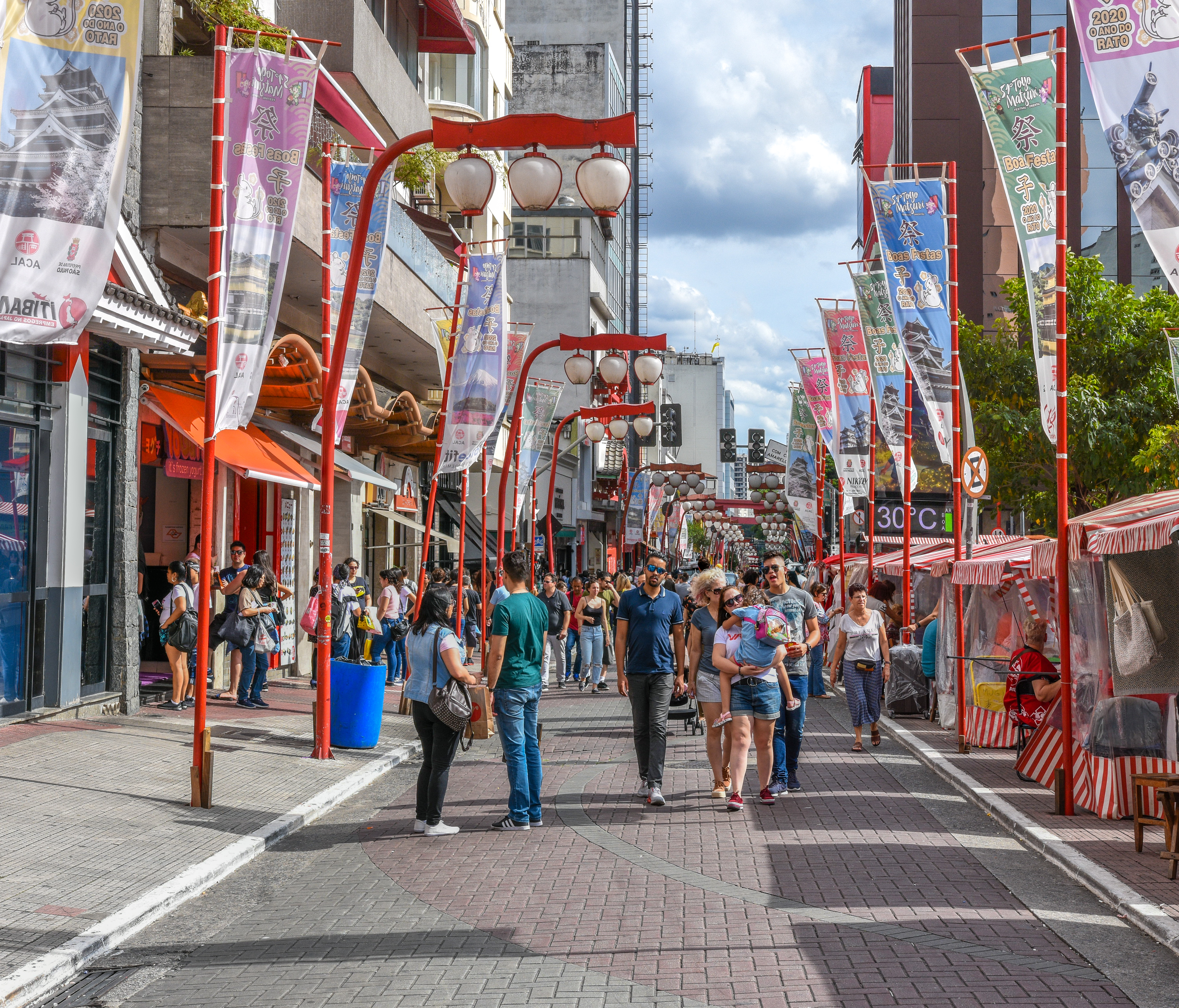
The Liberdade district is a Japantown of São Paulo.

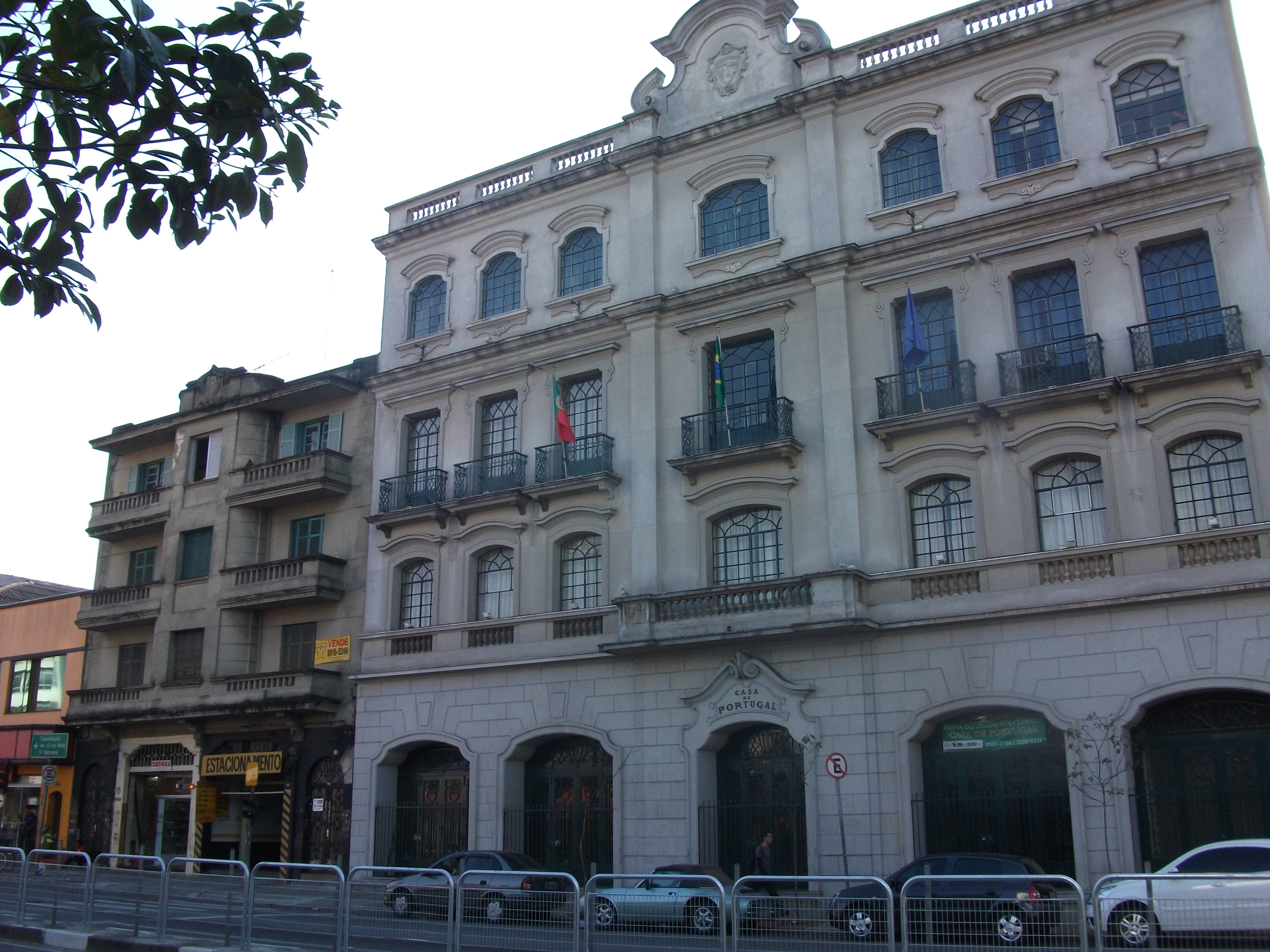
Casa de Portugal in São Paulo headquarters

Even today, Italians are grouped in areas like Bixiga, Brás, and Mooca to promote celebrations and festivals. In the early twentieth century, Italian and its dialects were spoken almost as much as Portuguese in the city, which influenced the formation of the São Paulo dialect of today. Six thousand pizzerias are producing about a million pizzas a day. Brazil has the largest Italian population outside Italy, with São Paulo being the most populous city with Italian ancestry in the world.

The Portuguese community is the largest, consisting of 6 million inhabitants. From the beginning, the Portuguese formed the root and foundation of Brazil, as they installed the Portuguese language, culture, the Catholic religion, laws, government bodies, courts, educational institutions, etc, in Brazil. Paulistanos have considerable origin in Portugal. The Jewish colony is more than 80,000 people in São Paulo and is concentrated mainly in Higienópolis and Bom Retiro.

From the nineteenth century through the first half of the twentieth century, São Paulo also received German immigrants (in the current Santo Amaro district), Spanish and Lithuanian (in the neighborhood Vila Zelina).

"A French observer, travelling to São Paulo at the time, noted that there was a division of the capitalist class, by nationality (...) Germans, French and Italians shared the dry goods sector with Brazilians. Foodstuffs was generally the province of either Portuguese or Brazilians, except for bakery and pastry which was the domain of the French and Germans. Shoes and tinware were mostly controlled by Italians. However, the larger metallurgical plants were in the hands of the English and the Americans. (...) Italians outnumbered Brazilians two to one in São Paulo."

—

Until 1920, 1,078,437 Italians entered in the State of São Paulo. Between 1888 and 1919, 38% of the immigrants were Italians, 10.2% were Spaniards and 40% were Portuguese. In 1920, nearly 80% of São Paulo city's population was composed of immigrants and their descendants and Italians made up over half of its male population. São Paulo also is home of the largest Japanese community outside Japan. In 1958 the census counted 120,000 Japanese in the city and by 1987, there were 326,000 with another 170,000 in the surrounding areas within São Paulo state. As of 2007, the Paulistano Japanese population outnumbered their fellow diaspora in the entirety of Peru, and in all individual American cities.

Research conducted by the University of São Paulo (USP) shows the city's high ethnic diversity: when asked if they are "descendants of foreign immigrants", 81% of the students reported "yes". The main reported ancestries were: Italian (30.5%), Portuguese (35%), Spanish (14%), Japanese (8%), German (6%), Brazilian (4%), African (3%), Arab (2%) and Jewish (1%).

The city once attracted numerous immigrants from all over Brazil and even from foreign countries, due to a strong economy and for being the hub of most Brazilian companies. São Paulo is also receiving waves of immigration from Haiti and from many countries of Africa and the Caribbean. Those immigrants are mainly concentrated in Praça da Sé, Glicério and Vale do Anhangabaú in the Central Zone of São Paulo.

Since the 19th century people began migrating from northeastern Brazil into São Paulo. This migration grew enormously in the 1930s and remained huge in the next decades.

=== Metropolitan area ===
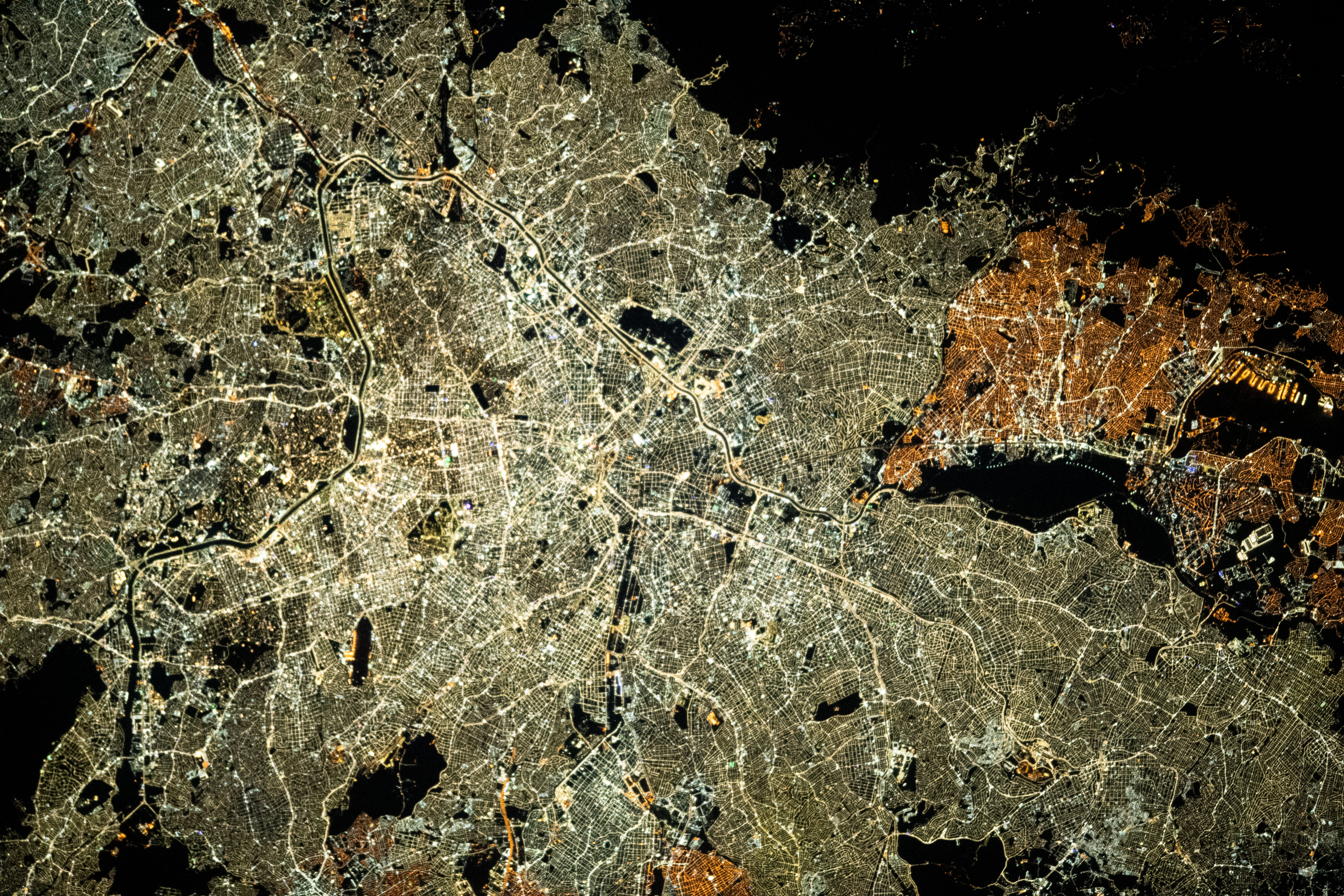
Satellite view of Greater São Paulo at night

The nonspecific term "Grande São Paulo" ("Greater São Paulo") covers multiple definitions. The legally defined Região Metropolitana de São Paulo consists of 39 municipalities in total and a population of 21.1 million inhabitants (as of the 2014 National Census).

Because São Paulo has urban sprawl, it uses a different definition for its metropolitan area alternately called the Expanded Metropolitan Complex of São Paulo and the São Paulo Macrometropolis. Analogous to the BosWash definition, it is one of the largest urban agglomerations in the world, with 32 million inhabitants, behind Tokyo, which includes four contiguous legally defined metropolitan regions and three micro-regions.

=== Religion ===
Religion in São Paulo (2010 Census)
Religion	%
Catholicism	58.2%
Protestantism	22.1%
No religion	9.38%
Spiritism	4.73%
Others	4.25%
Other Christians	1.33%

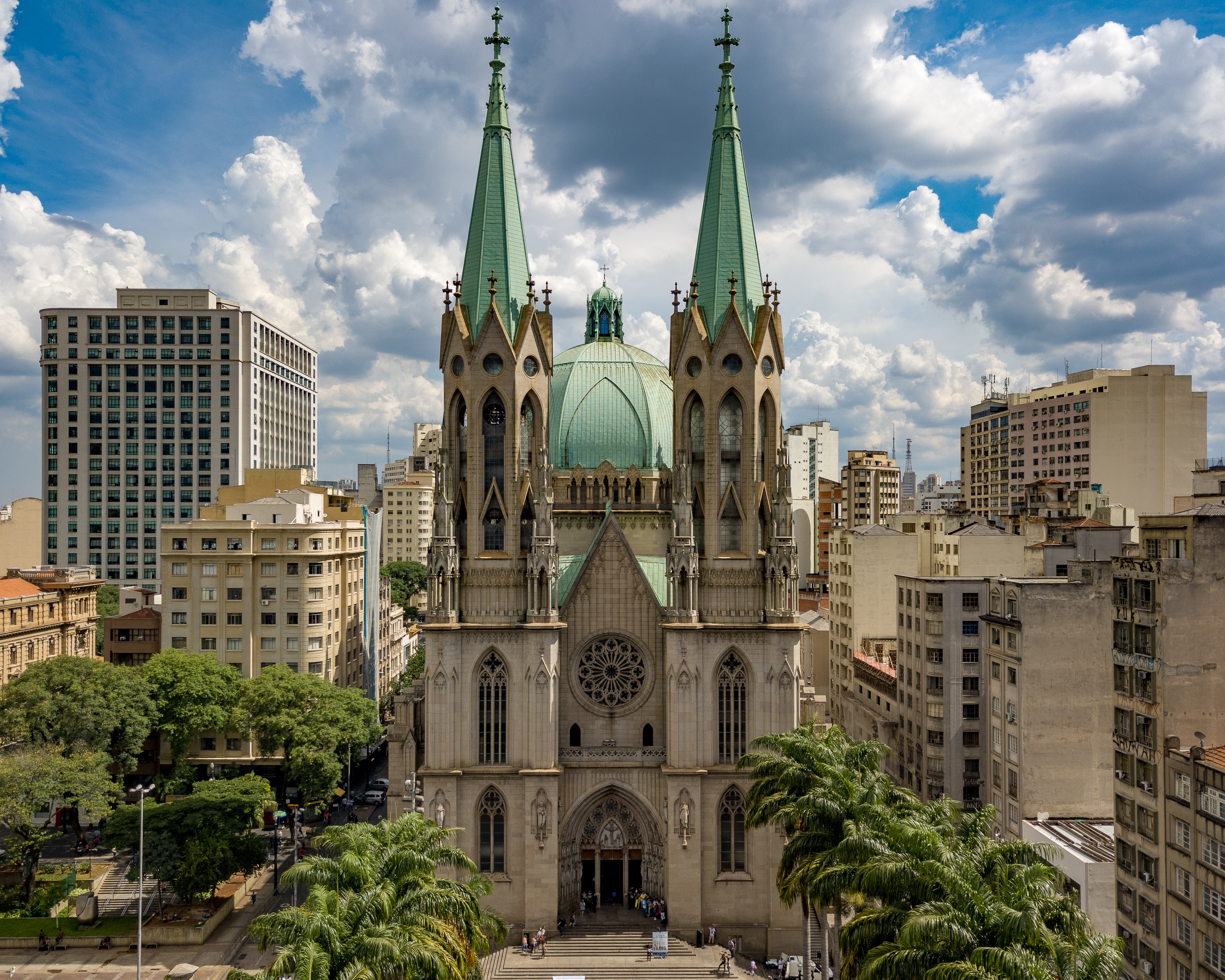
São Paulo Metropolitan Cathedral

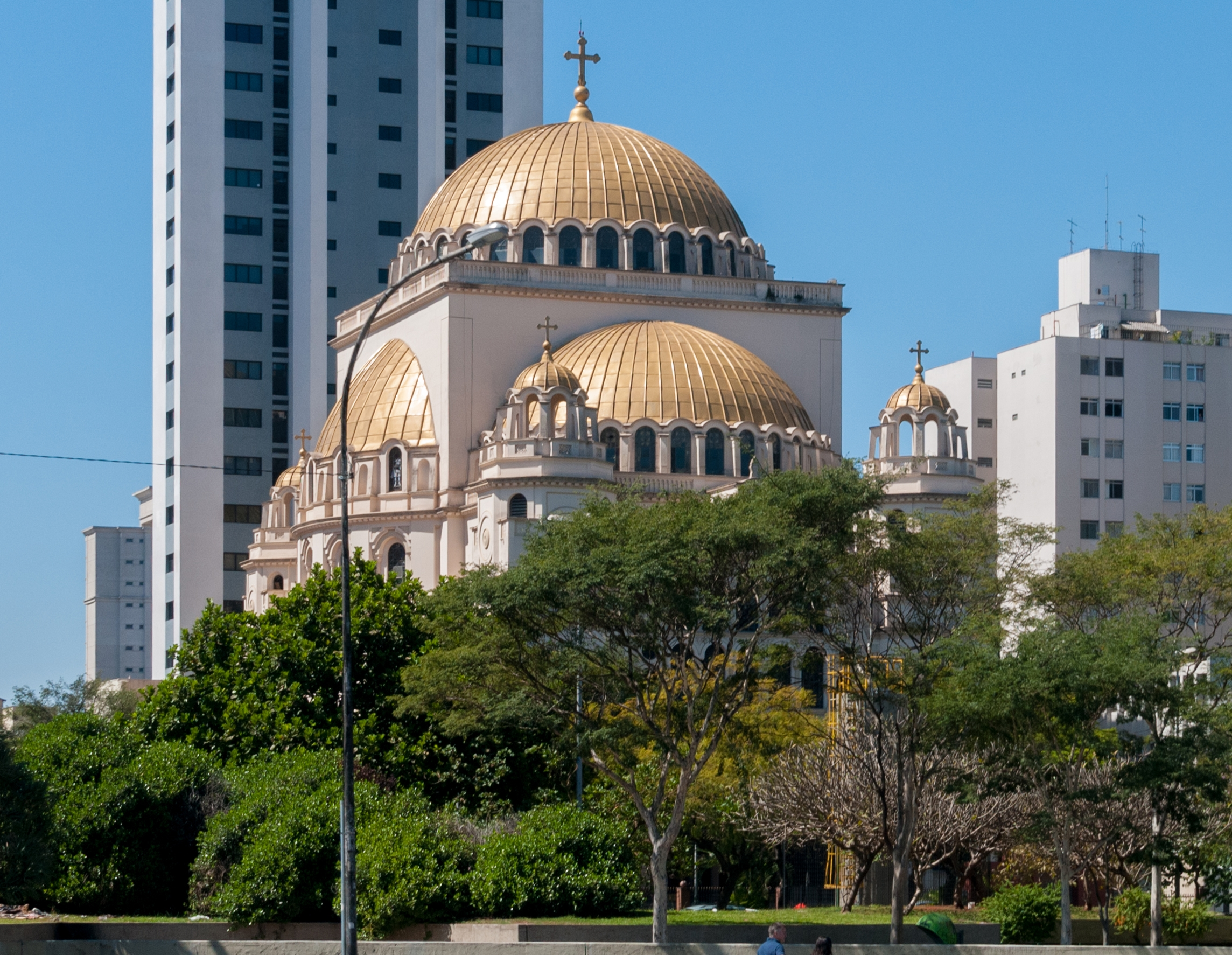
Orthodox Cathedral of São Paulo

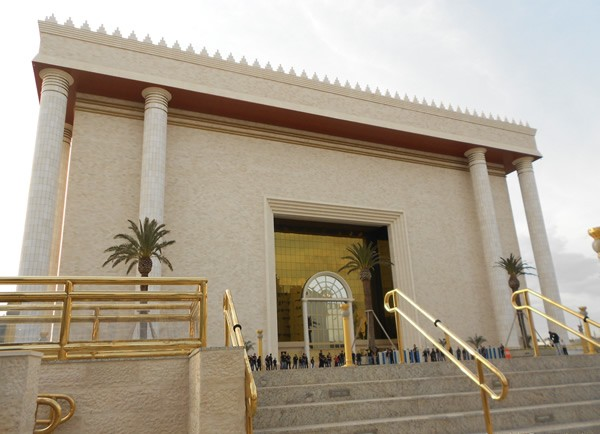
Temple of Solomon of the UCKG

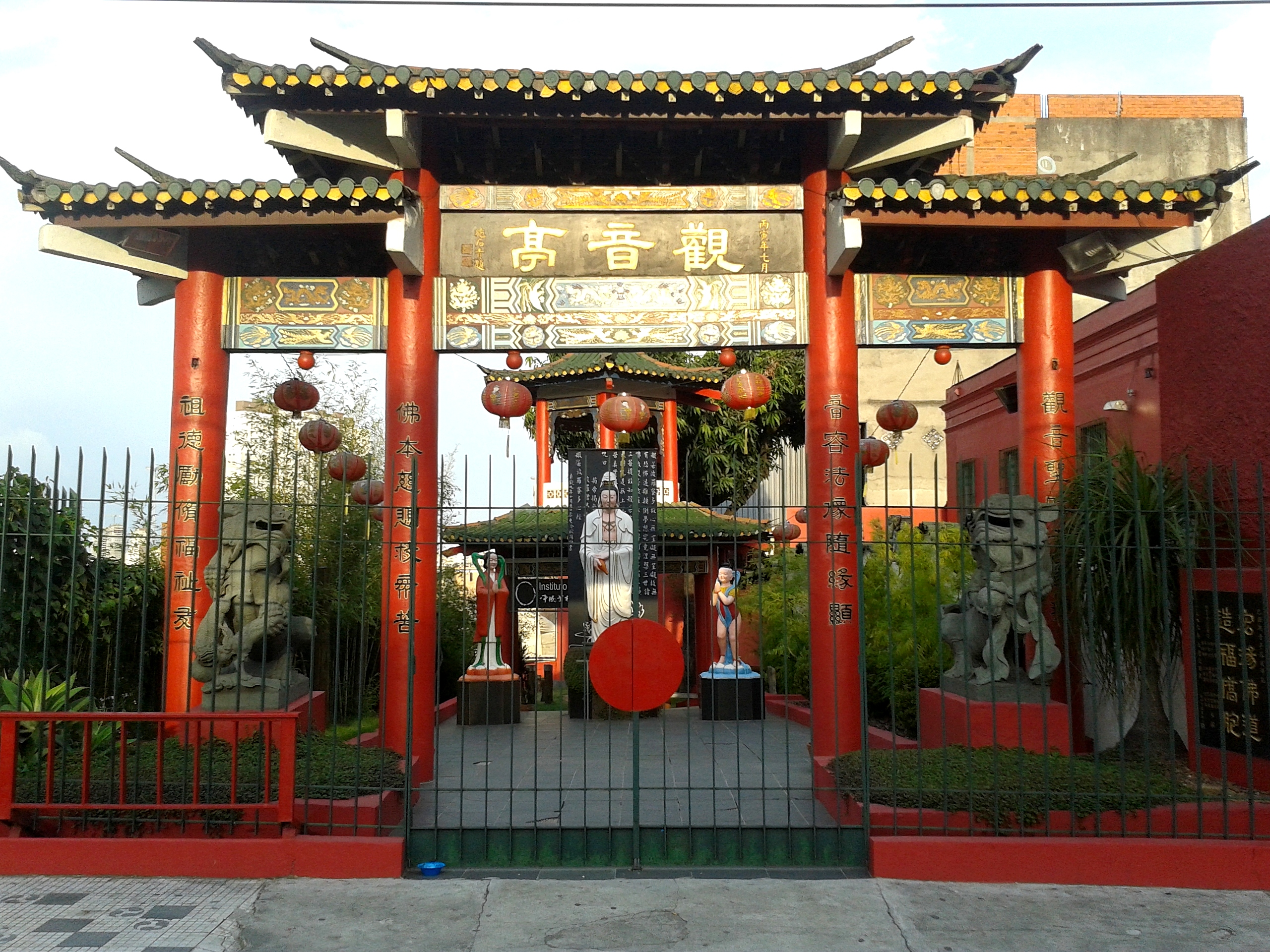
Buddhist Lohan Temple, Liberdade

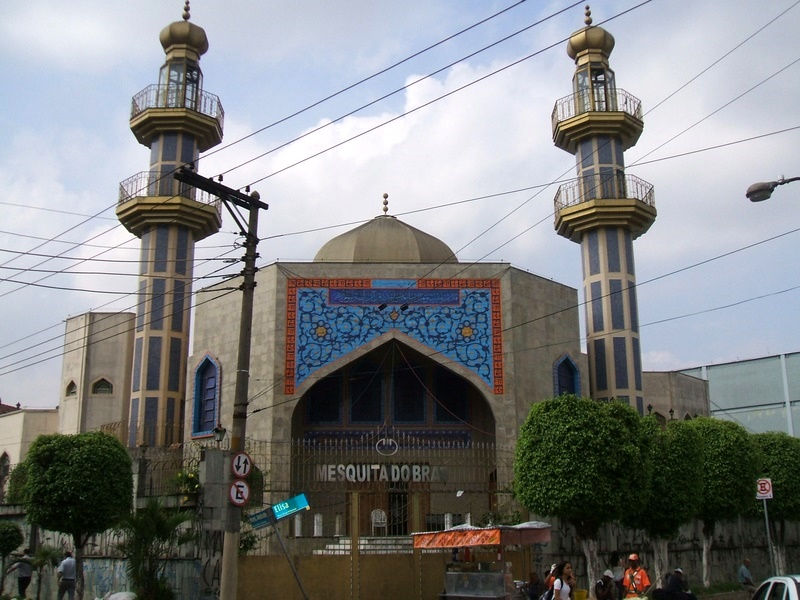
Brás mosque

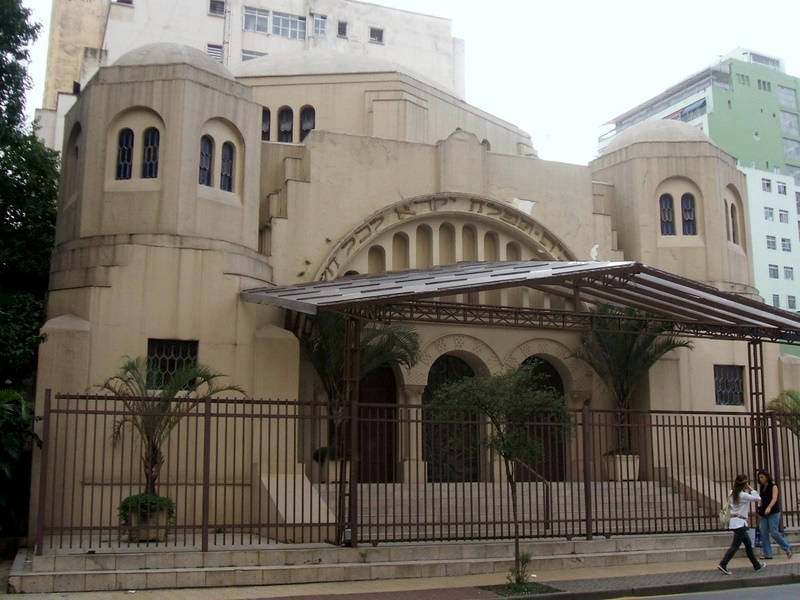
Beth El Synagogue

The official religion of the crown, the Portuguese colonisers brought with them Catholicism, which the majority of the population remain today. In 1891, when the first Brazilian Republican Constitution was set forth, Brazil ceased to have an official religion and has remained secular ever since, though the Catholic Church remained politically influential into the 1970s. The constitution of Brazil guarantees freedom of religion and strongly prohibits the establishment of any religion by banning government support or hindrance of religion at all levels.

According to data from the Brazilian Institute of Geography and Statistics (IBGE), in 2010 the population of São Paulo was 6,549,775 Roman Catholics (58.2%), 2,887,810 Protestants (22.1%), 531,822 Spiritists (4.7%), 101,493 Jehovah's Witnesses (0.9%), 75,075 Buddhists (0.7%), 50,794 Umbandists (0.5%), 43,610 Jews (0.4%), 28,673 Catholic Apostolic Brazilians (0.3%), 25,583 eastern religious (0.2%), 18,058 Candomblecists (0.2%), 17,321 Mormons (0.2%), 14,894 Eastern Orthodox (0.1%), 9,119 spiritualists (0.1%), 8,277 Muslims (0.1%), 7,139 esoteric (0.1%), 1,829 practiced Indian traditions (<0.1%) and 1,008 were Hindu (<0.1%). Others 1,056 008 had no religion (9.4%), 149,628 followed other Christian religiosities (1.3%), 55,978 had an undetermined religion or multiple belonging (0.5%), 14,127 did not know (0.1%) And 1,896 reported following other religiosities (<0.1%).

The Catholic Church divides the territory of the municipality of São Paulo into four ecclesiastical circumscriptions: the Archdiocese of São Paulo, and the adjacent Diocese of Santo Amaro, the Diocese of São Miguel Paulista and the Diocese of Campo Limpo, the last three suffragans of the first. The archive of the archdiocese, called the Metropolitan Archival Dom Duarte Leopoldo e Silva, in the Ipiranga district, holds one of the most important documentary heritage in Brazil. The archiepiscopal is the Metropolitan Cathedral of São Paulo (known as Sé Cathedral), in Praça da Sé, considered one of the five largest Gothic temples in the world. The Catholic Church recognizes as patron saints of the city Saint Paul of Tarsus and Our Lady of Penha of France.

The city has the most diverse Protestant or Reformed creeds, such as the Evangelical Community of Our Land, Maranatha Christian Church, Lutheran Church, Presbyterian Church, Methodist Church, Anglican Episcopal Church, Baptist churches, Assemblies of God in Brazil (the largest evangelical church in the country), The Seventh-day Adventist Church, the World Church of God's Power, the Universal Church of the Kingdom of God, the Christian Congregation in Brazil, among others, as well as Christians of various denominations.

=== Public security ===
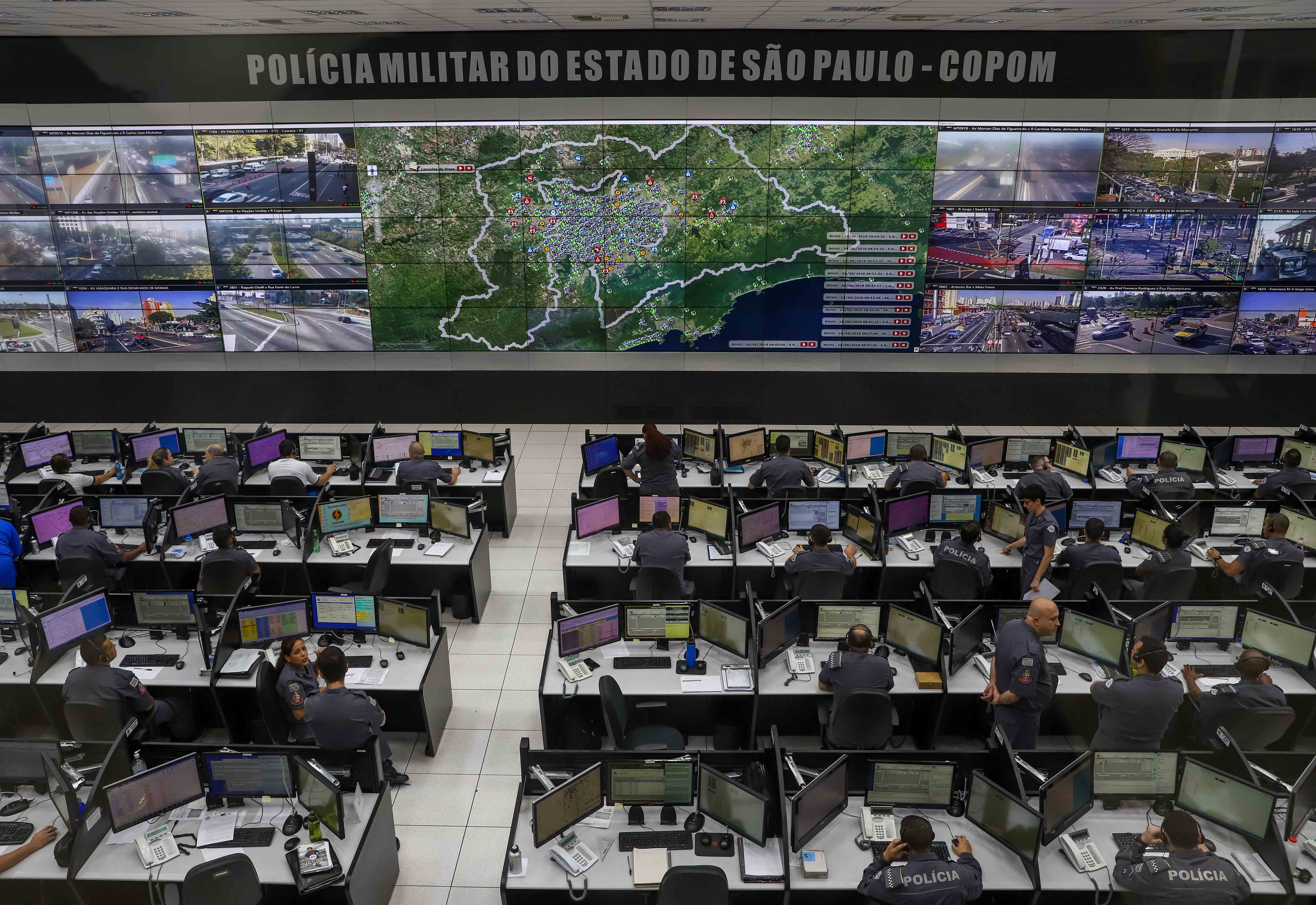
Tactical operations center of the Military Police of São Paulo State in São Paulo

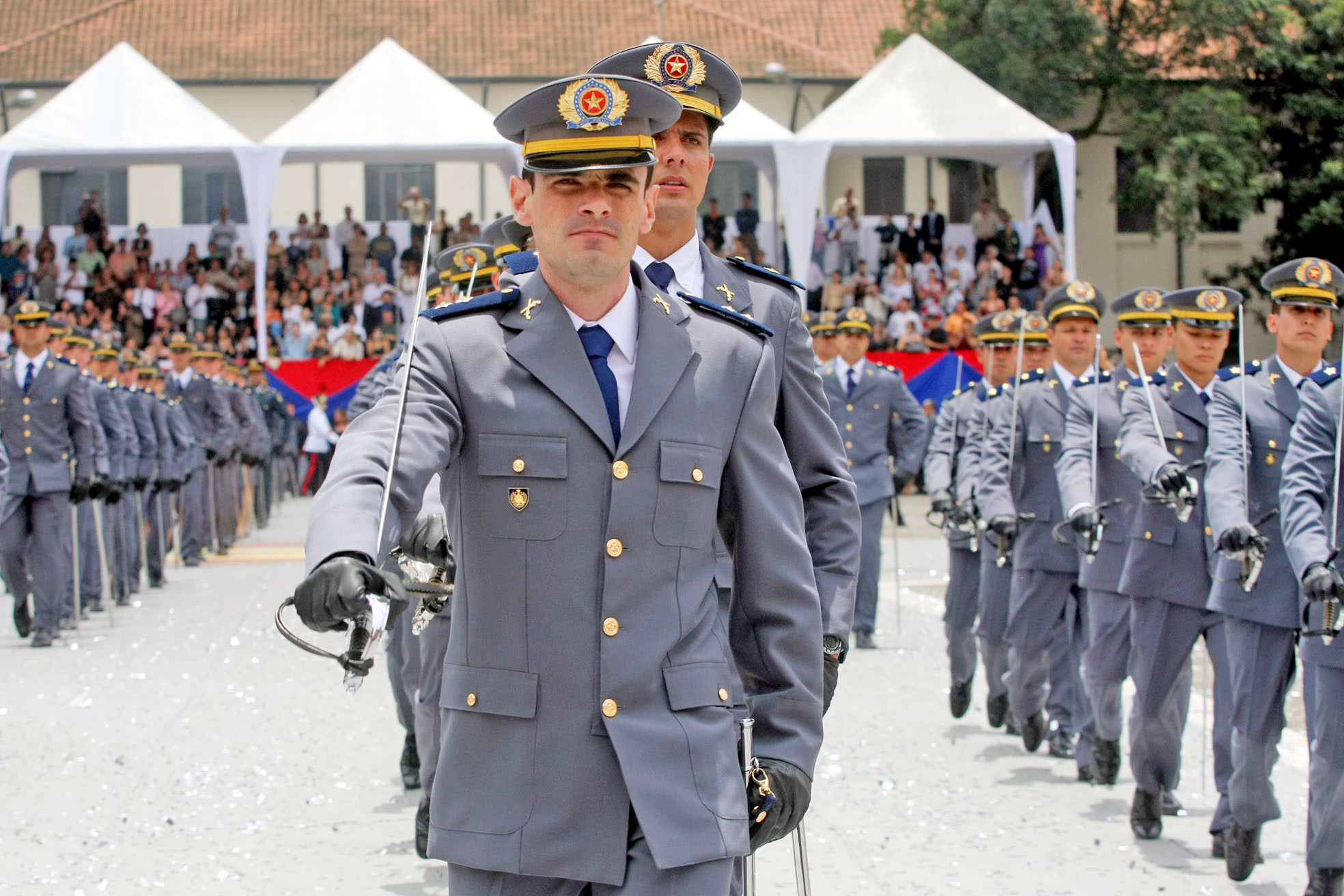
Training of soldiers of the Military Police of São Paulo State at the Military Police Academy of Barro Branco

In 2008, the city of São Paulo ranked 493rd on the list of the most violent cities in Brazil. Among the capitals, it was the fourth least violent, registering, in 2006, homicide rates higher only than those of Boa Vista, Palmas and Natal. In November 2009, the Ministry of Justice and the Brazilian Public Security Forum released a survey that identified São Paulo as the safest Brazilian capital for young people. Between 2000 and 2010, the city of São Paulo reduced its homicide rate by 78%.

According to the 2011 Global Homicide Study, released by the United Nations (UN), in the period between 2004 and 2009 the homicide rate fell from 20.8 to 10.8 murders per hundred thousand inhabitants. In 2011, the UN pointed to São Paulo as an example of how large cities can reduce crime. In a survey on the Adolescent Homicide Index (AHI) in 2010, the city of São Paulo was considered the least lethal for adolescents, among 283 municipalities surveyed, with more than 100,000 inhabitants. According to data from the "Map of Violence 2011", published by the Sangari Institute and the Ministry of Justice, the city had the lowest homicide rate per hundred thousand inhabitants that year among all the state capitals in Brazil.

Crime indicators, such as homicide, according to data from April 2017, showed a reduction in the capital of São Paulo, compared to 2016. In the same period, there was a 12.64% reduction in homicides, the number of robbery records fell by eleven to seven (34% reduction), and there was an 8.09% reduction in rape cases. The 9th DP in the Carandiru neighborhood was considered, in March 2007, one of the five best police stations in the world and the best in Latin America.

Based on data from IBGE and the Ministry of Health, it is considered the 2nd safest capital and the least lethal capital in the country, according to the 2023 Brazilian Public Security Yearbook.

=== Social challenges ===
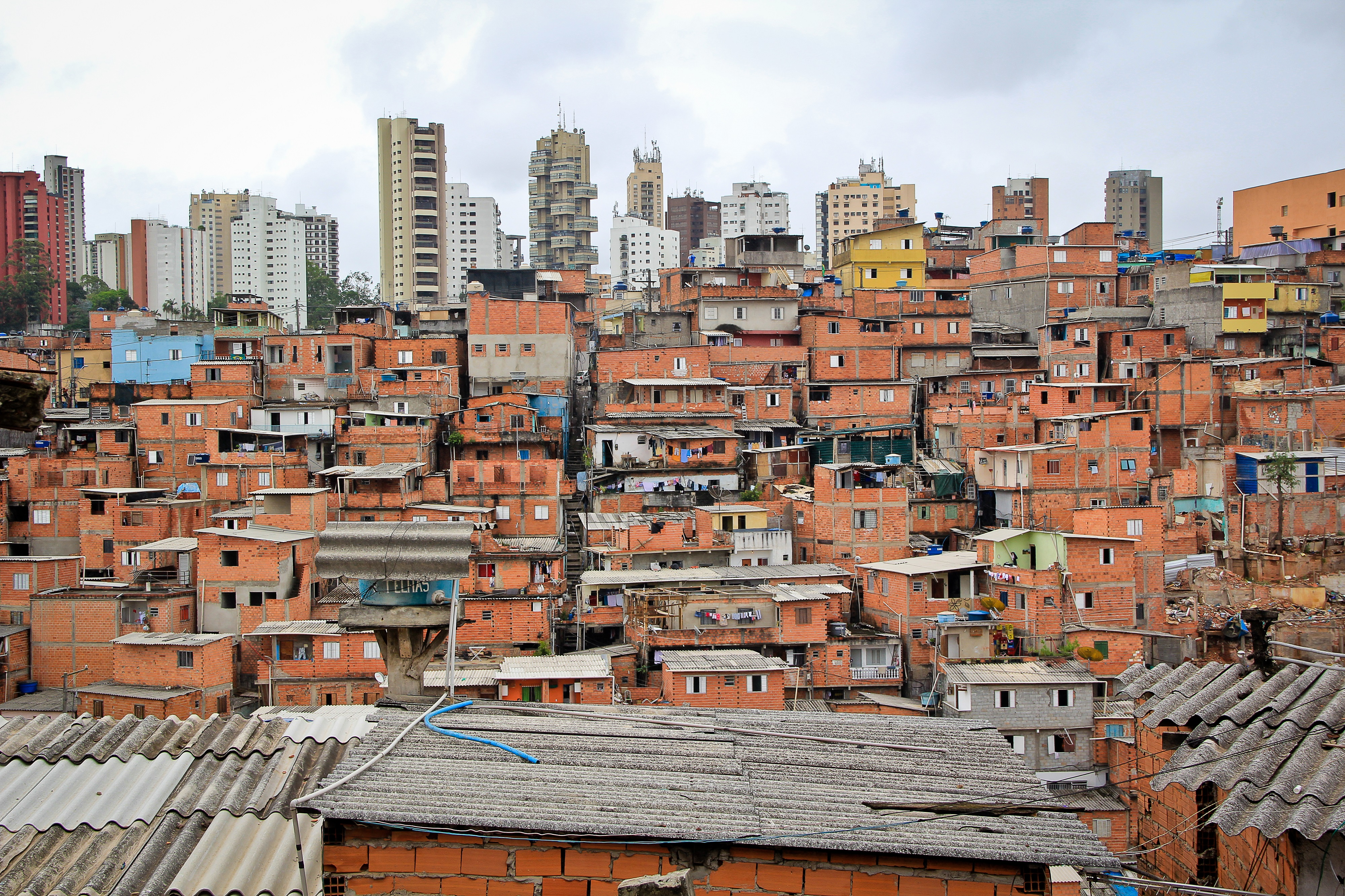
Paraisópolis, the largest slum (favela) in the city, with residential buildings in the background

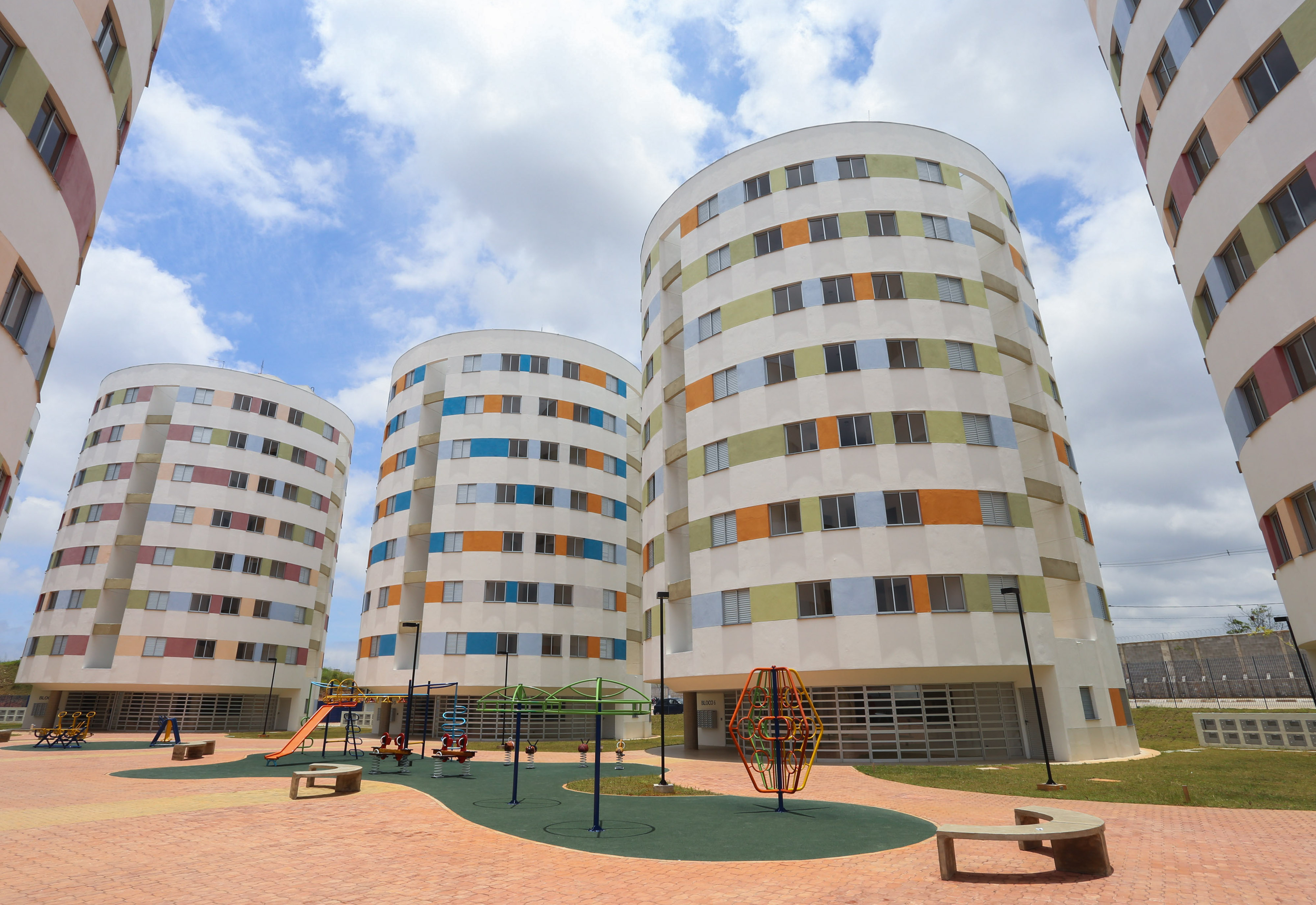
Public housing in Heliópolis

Since the beginning of the 20th century, São Paulo has been a major economic focal point in Latin America. During two World Wars and the Great Depression, coffee exports (from other regions of the state) were critically affected. This led wealthy coffee farmers to invest in industrial activities that turned São Paulo into Brazil's largest industrial hub.

- Crime rates consistently decreased in the 21st century. The citywide homicide rate was 6.56 in 2019, less than a fourth of the 27.38 national rate.
- Air quality has steadily increased during the modern era.
- The two major rivers crossing the city, Tietê and Pinheiros, are highly polluted. A major project to clean up these rivers is underway.
- The Clean City Law or antibillboard, approved in 2007, focused on two main targets: anti-publicity and anti-commerce. Advertisers estimate that they removed 15,000 billboards and that more than 1,600 signs and 1,300 towering metal panels were dismantled by authorities.
- São Paulo metropolitan region, adopted vehicle restrictions from 1996 to 1998 to reduce air pollution during wintertime. Since 1997, a similar project was implemented throughout the year in the central area of São Paulo to improve traffic.
- There were more than 30,000 homeless people in 2021 according to official data. It increased by 31% in two years, and doubled in 20 years.

=== Languages ===
The primary language is Portuguese. The general language from São Paulo General, or Tupi Austral (Southern Tupi), was the Tupi-based trade language of what is now São Vicente, São Paulo, and the upper Tietê River. In the 17th century it was widely spoken in São Paulo and spread to its border regions while in Brazil. From 1750 on, following orders from Marquess of Pombal, Portuguese language was introduced through immigration and consequently taught to children in schools. The original Tupi Austral language subsequently lost ground to Portuguese, and eventually became extinct. Due to the large influx of Japanese, German, Spanish, Italian and Arab immigrants etc., the Portuguese idiom spoken in the metropolitan area of São Paulo reflects influences from those languages.

The Italian influence in São Paulo accents is evident in its Italian districts such as Bela Vista, Mooca, Brás and Lapa. Italian mingled with Portuguese and as an old influence, was assimilated or disappeared into spoken language. The local accent with Italian influences became notorious through the songs of Adoniran Barbosa, a Brazilian samba singer born to Italian parents who used to sing using the local accent.

Other languages spoken in the city are mainly among the Asian community: São Paulo is home to the largest Japanese population outside Japan. Although today most Japanese-Brazilians speak only Portuguese, some of them are still fluent in Japanese. Some people of Chinese and Korean descent are still able to speak their ancestral languages. In some areas it is still possible to find descendants of immigrants who speak German (especially in the area of Brooklin paulista) and Lithuanian or Russian or East European languages (especially in the area of Vila Zelina). In the west zone of São Paulo, specially at Vila Anastácio and Lapa region, there is a Hungarian colony, with three churches (Calvinist, Baptist and Catholic), so on Sundays it is possible to see Hungarians talking to each other on sidewalks.

=== Sexual diversity ===
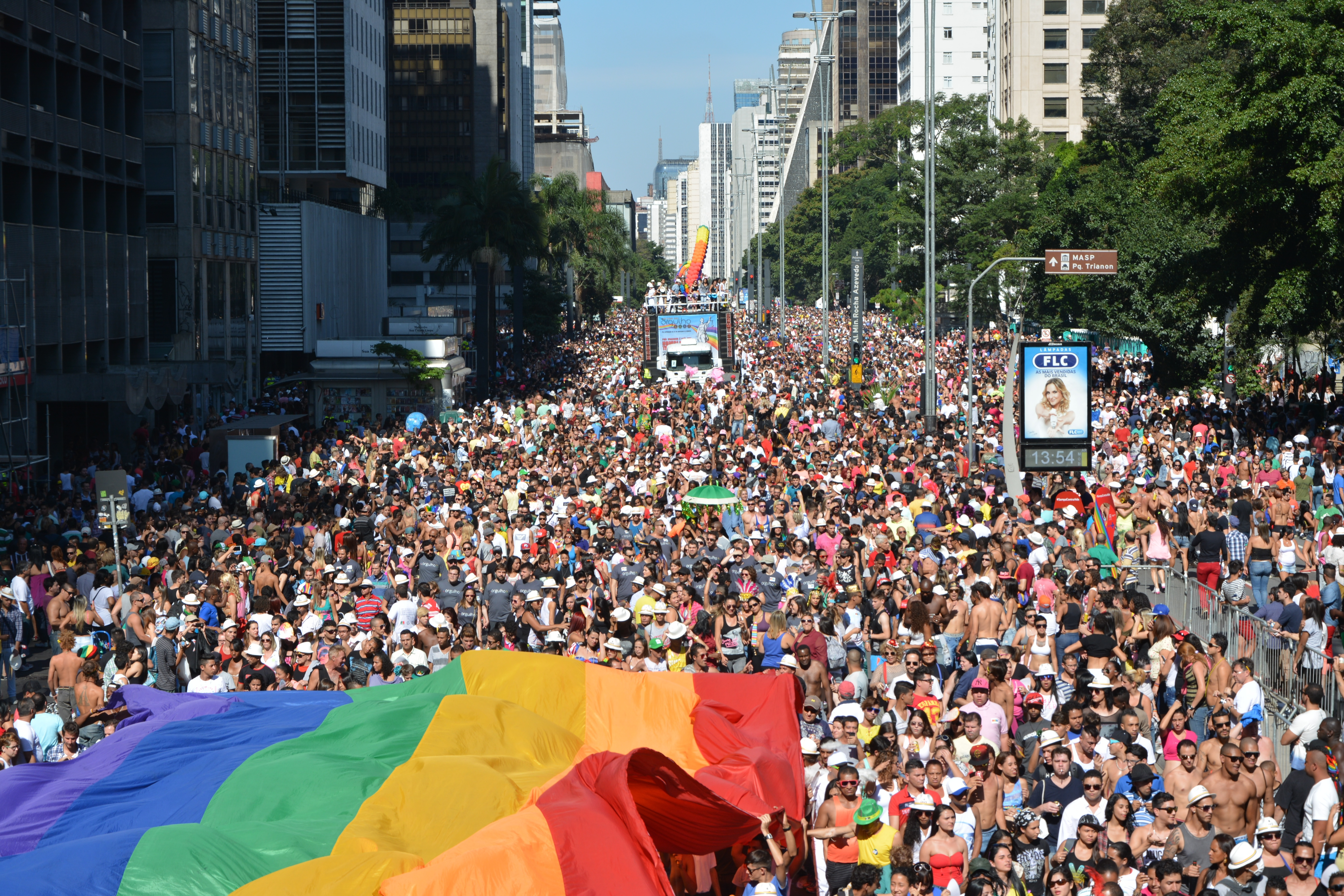
The 18th edition of the São Paulo Gay Pride Parade in 2014

The Greater São Paulo is home to a prominent self-identifying gay, bisexual and transgender community, with 9.6% of the male population and 7% of the female population declaring themselves to be non-heterosexual. Same-sex civil unions were legalised in Brazil in 2011 and same-sex marriage in 2012. Since 1997, the city has hosted the annual São Paulo Gay Pride Parade, considered the biggest pride parade in the world by the Guinness Book of World Records with over 5 million participants, and typically rivalling the New York City Pride March for the record.

Strongly supported by the State and the City of São Paulo government authorities, in 2010, the city hall of São Paulo invested R$1 million reais in the parade and provided a solid security plan, with approximately 2,000 policemen, two mobile police stations for immediate reporting of occurrences, 30 equipped ambulances, 55 nurses, 46 medical physicians, three hospital camps with 80 beds. The parade, considered the city's second largest event after the Formula One, begins at the São Paulo Museum of Art, crosses Paulista Avenue, and follows Consolação Street to Praça Roosevelt in Downtown São Paulo. According to the LGBT app Grindr, the gay parade of the city was elected the best in the world.

=== Education ===
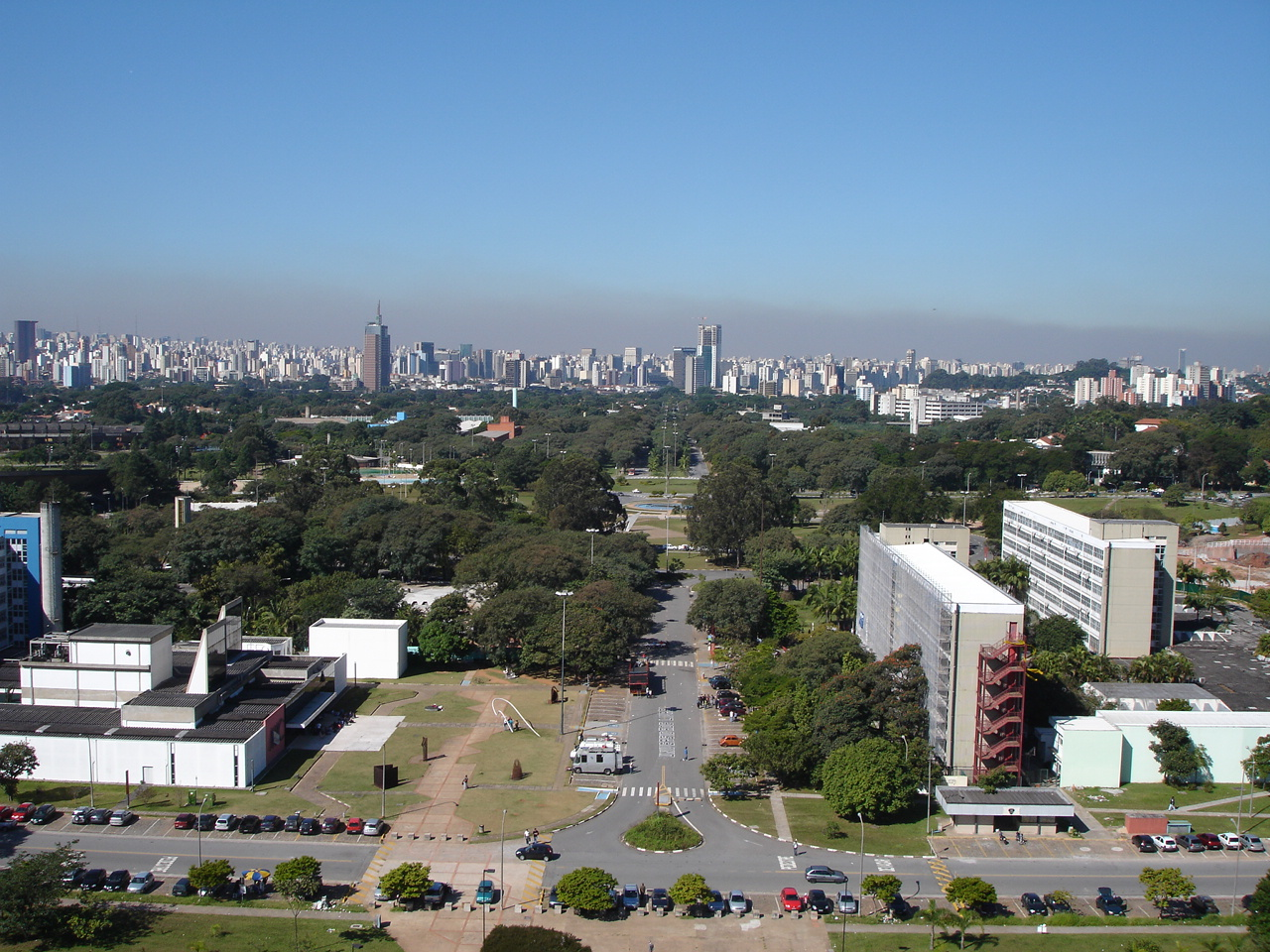
University of São Paulo

São Paulo has public and private primary and secondary schools and vocational-technical schools. More than nine-tenths of the population are literate and roughly the same proportion of those age 7 to 14 are enrolled in school. There are 578 universities in the state of São Paulo.

The city of São Paulo is also home to research and development facilities and attracts companies due to the presence of regionally renowned universities. Science, technology and innovation is leveraged by the allocation of funds from the state government, mainly carried out by means of the Foundation to Research Support in the State of São Paulo (Fundação de Amparo à Pesquisa do Estado de São Paulo – FAPESP), one of the main agencies promoting scientific and technological research.

=== Health care ===
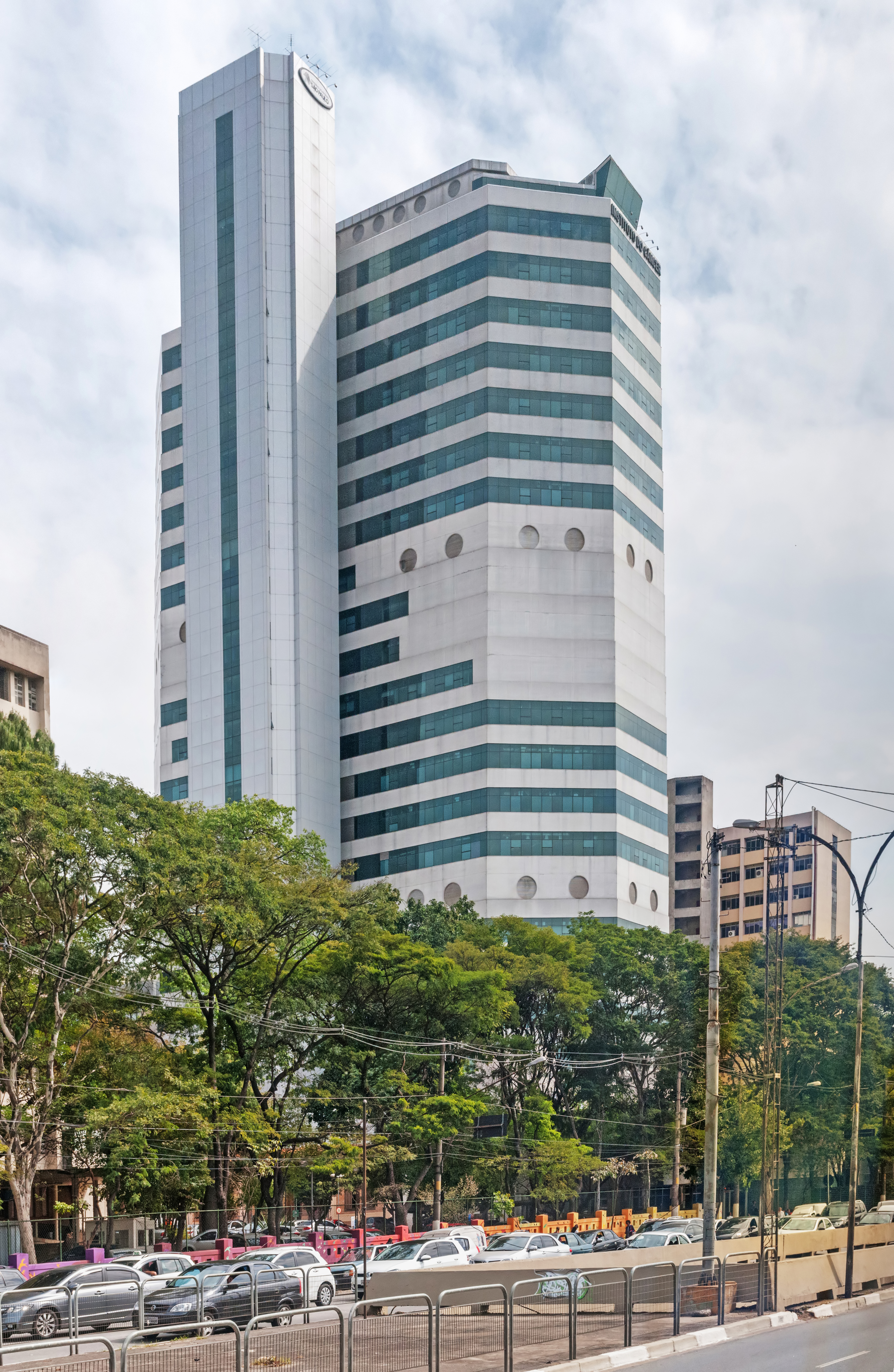
Institute of Cancer of São Paulo, the largest oncology center in Latin America

São Paulo is one of the largest health care hubs in Latin America. Among its hospitals are the Albert Einstein Israelite Hospital, ranked the best hospital in all Latin America and the Hospital das Clínicas, the largest in the region, with a total area of 600,000 square meters and offers 2,400 beds, distributed among its eight specialized institutes and two assisting hospitals.

The main hospitals in the city of São Paulo concentrate in the upper-income areas, the majority of the population of the city has a private health insurance. This can includes hospitals, private practices and pharmacies. The city of São Paulo has the largest number of foreigners comparing with any other Brazilian city and an intense health tourism. In Brazil, the city of São Paulo has the largest number of doctors who can speak more than one language, which in this case is Portuguese, with the secondary languages predominantly are English and Spanish.

The private health care sector is very large and most of Brazil's best hospitals are in the city. As of September 2009, the city of São Paulo had: 32,553 ambulatory clinics, centers and professional offices (physicians, dentists and others); 217 hospitals, with 32,554 beds; 137,745 health care professionals, including 28,316 physicians.

The municipal government operates public health facilities across the city's territory, with 770 primary health care units (UBS), ambulatory and emergency clinics and 17 hospitals. The Municipal Secretary of Health has 59,000 employees, including 8,000 physicians and 12,000 nurses. 6,000,000 citizens uses the facilities, which provide drugs at no cost and manage an extensive family health program (PSF – Programa de Saúde da Família).

The Sistema Integrado de Gestão de Assistência à Saúde de São Paulo – SIGA Saúde (Integrated Health Care Management System in São Paulo) has been operating in the city of São Paulo since 2004. Today there are more than 22 million registered users, including the people of the Greater São Paulo, with a monthly average of 1.3 million appointments.

== Government ==
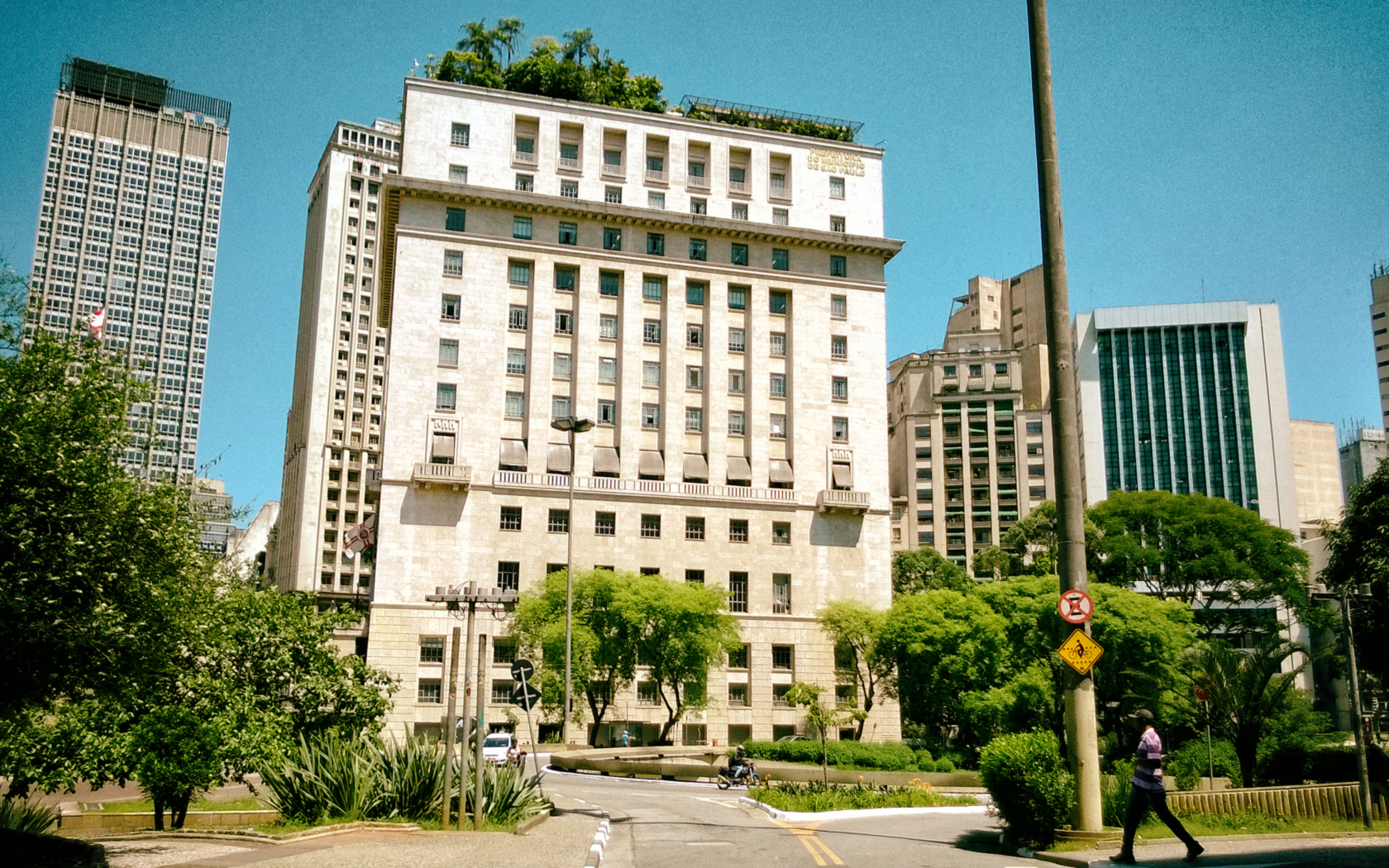
Matarazzo Building, the São Paulo city hall

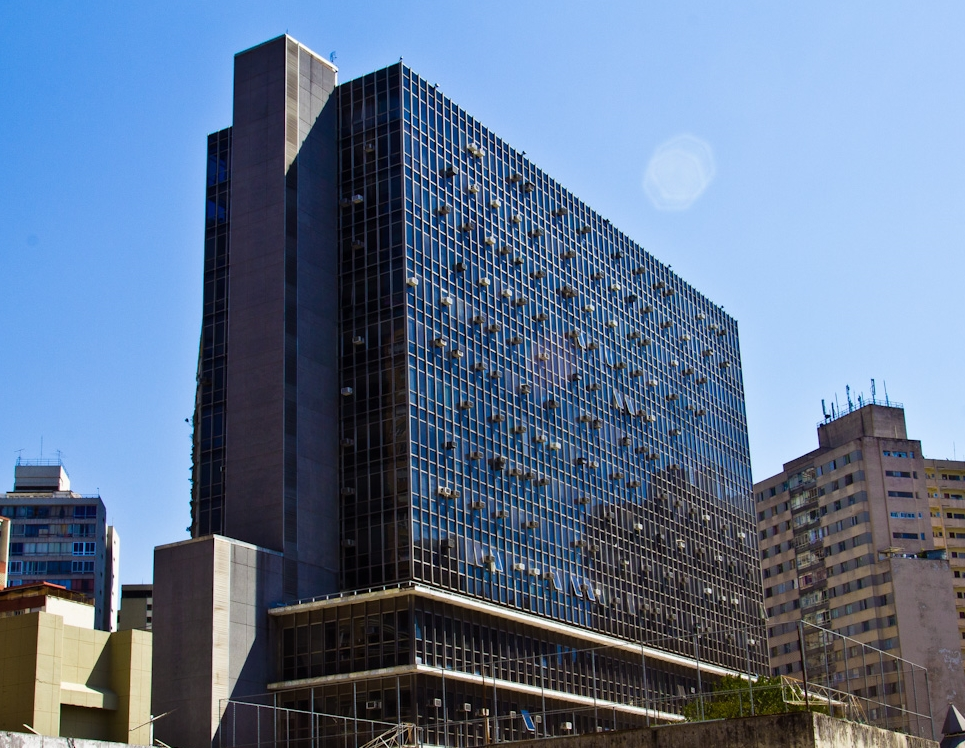
Municipal Chamber of São Paulo

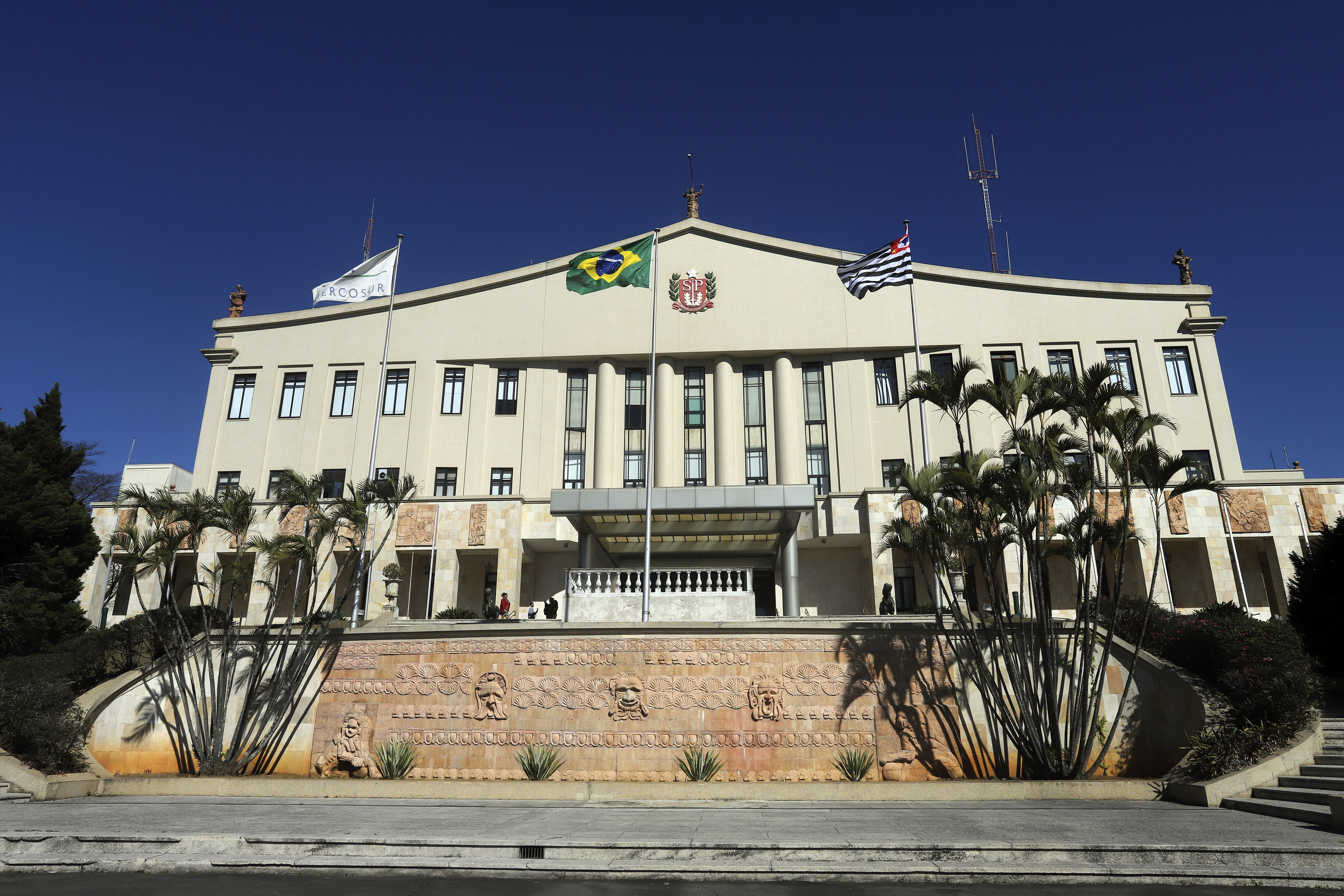
Bandeirantes Palace, the seat of state government

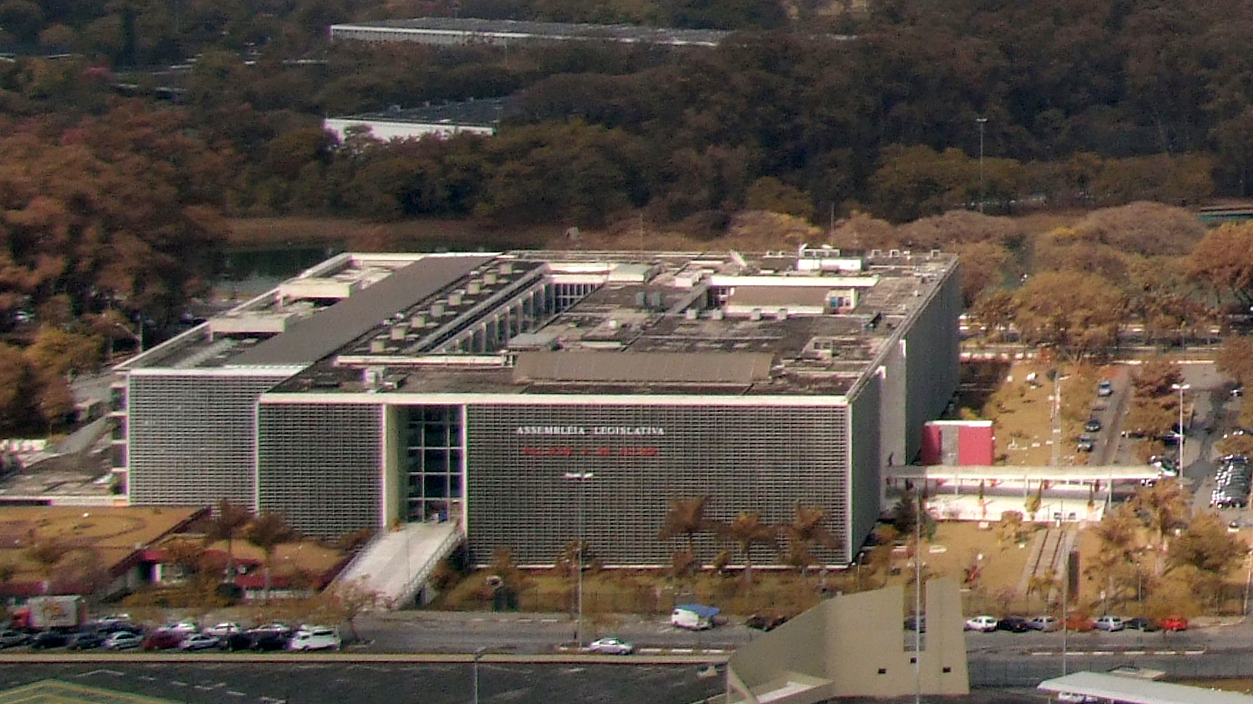
Legislative Assembly of São Paulo

As the capital of the state of São Paulo, the city is home to the Bandeirantes Palace (state government) and the Legislative Assembly. The Executive Branch of the municipality of São Paulo is represented by the mayor and his cabinet of secretaries, following the model proposed by the Federal Constitution. The organic law of the municipality and the Master Plan of the city, however, determine that the public administration must guarantee to the population effective tools of manifestation of participatory democracy, which causes that the city is divided in regional prefectures, each one led by a Regional Mayor appointed by the Mayor.

The legislative power is represented by the Municipal Chamber, composed of 55 aldermen elected to four-year posts (in compliance with the provisions of Article 29 of the Constitution, which dictates a minimum number of 42 and a maximum of 55 for municipalities with more than five million inhabitants). It is up to the house to draft and vote fundamental laws for the administration and the Executive, especially the municipal budget (known as the Law of Budgetary Guidelines). In addition to the legislative process and the work of the secretariats, there are also a number of municipal councils, each dealing with different topics, composed of representatives of the various sectors of organized civil society. The actual performance and representativeness of such councils, however, are sometimes questioned.

=== Subdivisions ===
São Paulo is divided into 32 subprefectures, each with an administration ("subprefeitura") divided into several districts ("distritos"). The city also has a radial division into nine zones for purpose of traffic control and bus lines, which do not fit into the administrative divisions. These zones are identified by colors in the street signs. The historical core of São Paulo, which includes the inner city and the area of Paulista Avenue, is in the Subprefecture of Sé. Most other economic and tourist facilities of the city are inside an area officially called Centro Expandido (Portuguese for "Broad Center", or "Broad Downtown"), which includes Sé and several other subprefectures, and areas immediately around it.

Subprefectures of São Paulo
	Subprefecture	Area	Population		Subprefecture	Area	Population
1	Aricanduva/Vila Formosa	21.5 km^{2}	266 838	17	Mooca	35.2 km^{2}	305 436
2	Butantã	56.1 km^{2}	345 943	18	Parelheiros	353.5 km^{2}	110 909
3	Campo Limpo	36.7 km^{2}	508 607	19	Penha	42.8 km^{2}	472 247
4	Capela do Socorro	134.2 km^{2}	561 071	20	Perus	57.2 km^{2}	109 218
5	Casa Verde/Cachoeirinha	26.7 km^{2}	313 176	21	Pinheiros	31.7 km^{2}	270 798
6	Cidade Ademar	30.7 km^{2}	370 759	22	Pirituba/Jaraguá	54.7 km^{2}	390 083
7	Cidade Tiradentes	15 km^{2}	248 762	23	Sé	26.2 km^{2}	373 160
8	Ermelino Matarazzo	15.1 km^{2}	204 315	24	Santana/Tucuruvi	34.7 km^{2}	327 279
9	Freguesia do Ó/Brasilândia	31.5 km^{2}	391 403	25	Jaçanã/Tremembé	64.1 km^{2}	255 435
10	Guaianases	17.8 km^{2}	283 162	26	Santo Amaro	37.5 km^{2}	217 280
11	Ipiranga	37.5 km^{2}	427 585	27	São Mateus	45.8 km^{2}	422 199
12	Itaim Paulista	21.7 km^{2}	358 888	28	São Miguel Paulista	24.3 km^{2}	377 540
13	Itaquera	54.3 km^{2}	488 327	29	Sapopemba	13.4 km^{2}	296 042
14	Jabaquara	14.1 km^{2}	214 200	30	Vila Maria/Vila Guilherme	26.4 km^{2}	302 899
15	Lapa	40.1 km^{2}	270 102	31	Vila Mariana	26.5 km^{2}	311 019
16	M'Boi Mirim	62.1 km^{2}	523 138	32	Vila Prudente	33.3 km^{2}	480 823

=== International relations ===
São Paulo is twinned with:

- Amman, Jordan
- Asunción, Paraguay
- Beijing, China
- Belmonte, Portugal
- Bucharest, Romania
- Chicago, United States
- Cluj-Napoca, Romania
- Coimbra, Portugal
- Córdoba, Spain
- Damascus, Syria
- Funchal, Portugal
- Góis, Portugal
- Hamburg, Germany
- Havana, Cuba
- Huaibei, China
- İzmir, Turkey
- Lima, Peru
- Leiria, Portugal
- Luanda, Angola
- Macau, China
- Mendoza, Argentina
- Milan, Italy
- Naha, Japan
- Ningbo, China
- Osaka, Japan
- La Paz, Bolivia
- Santiago, Chile
- Santiago de Compostela, Spain
- Seoul, South Korea
- Shanghai, China
- Tel Aviv, Israel
- Toronto, Canada
- Yerevan, Armenia

== Economy ==
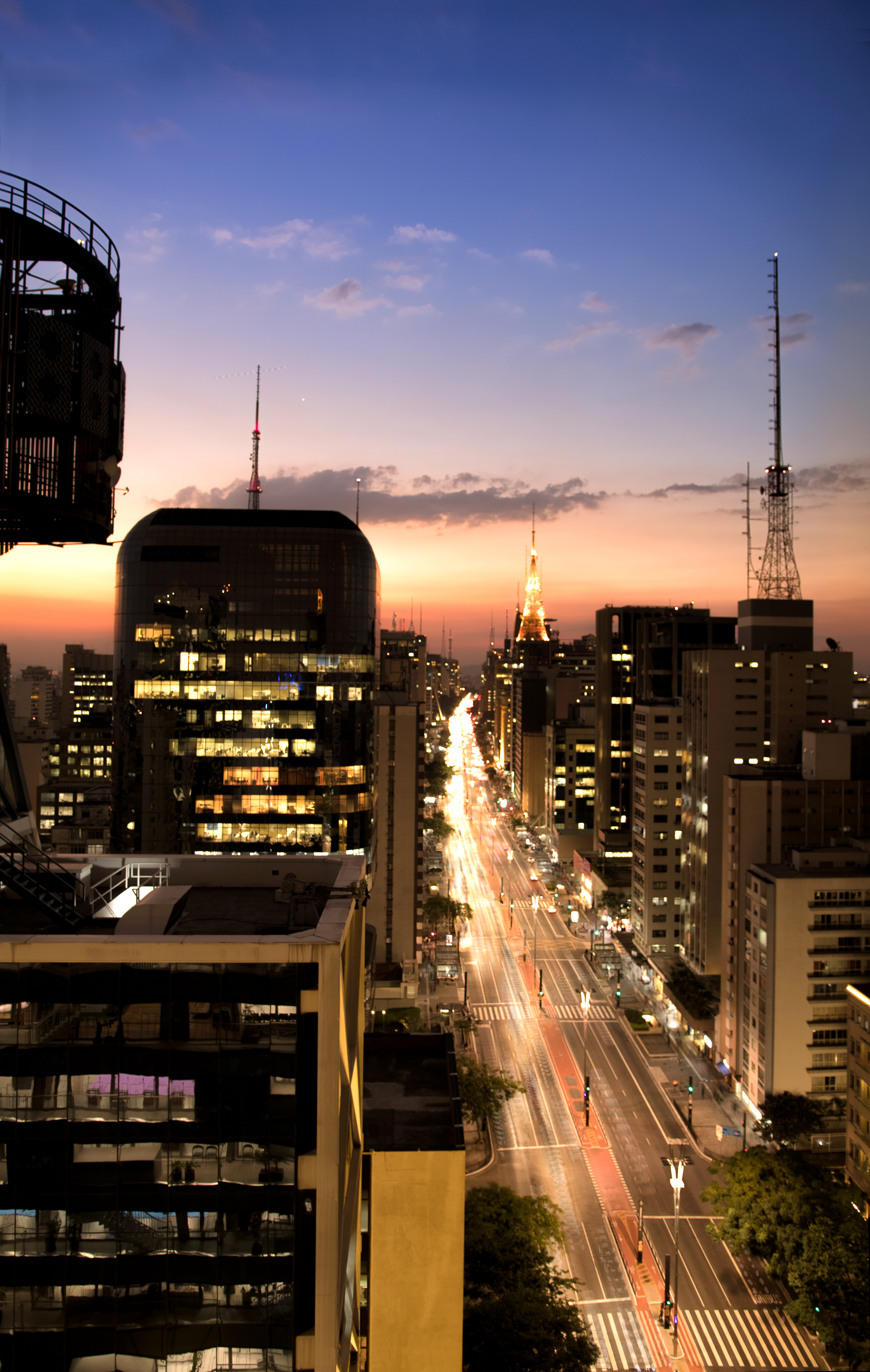
Paulista Avenue, the headquarters of many financial and cultural institutions

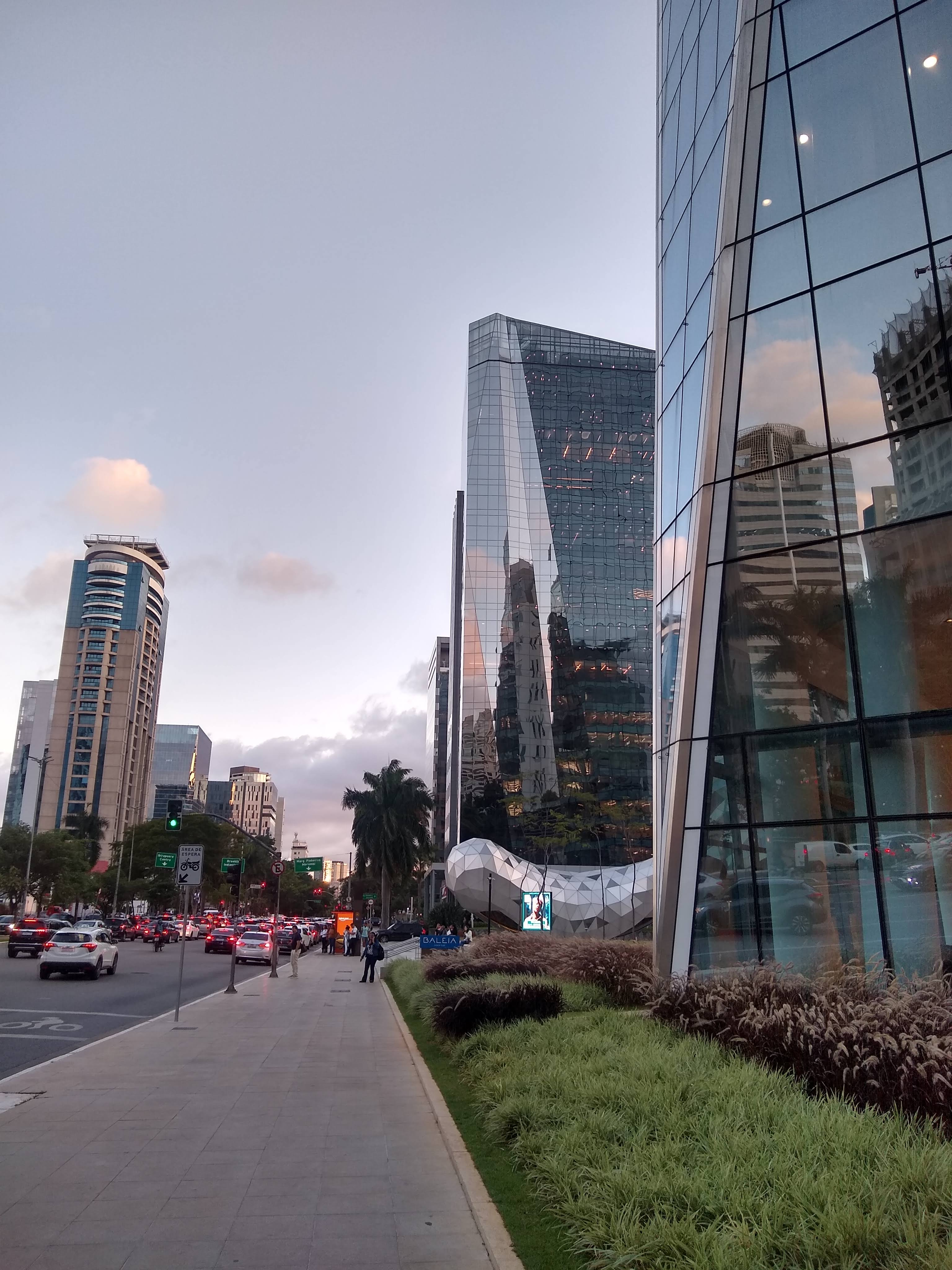
Brigadeiro Faria Lima Avenue, the main financial district of São Paulo

São Paulo is the city with the largest share of Brazil's GDP and has one of the highest city GDPs in the world. According to data from the IBGE, its gross domestic product (GDP) in 2010 was R$450 billion, approximately US$220 billion, 12.26% of Brazilian GDP and 36% of the São Paulo state's GDP. The per capita income for the city was R$47.802,02 in 2022.

São Paulo is considered the financial capital of Brazil, as it is the location for the headquarters of major corporations and of banks and financial institutions. The city is the headquarters of B3, the largest stock exchange of Latin America by market capitalization, and has several financial districts, mainly in the areas around Paulista, Faria Lima and Berrini avenues. 63% of all the international companies with business in Brazil have their head offices in São Paulo. São Paulo has one of the largest concentrations of German businesses worldwide and is the largest Swedish industrial hub alongside Gothenburg.

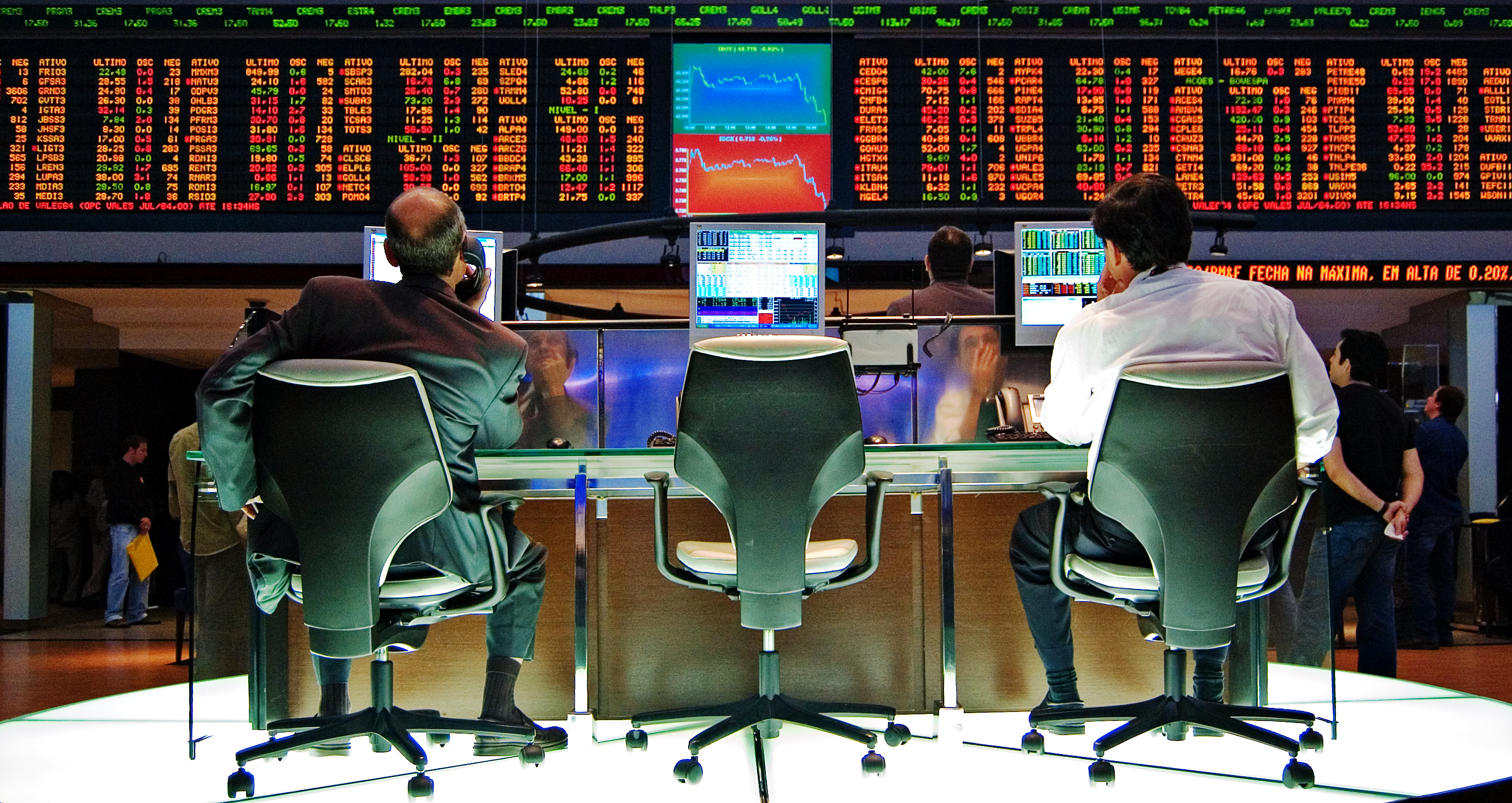
B3, the largest stock exchange of Latin America by market capitalization

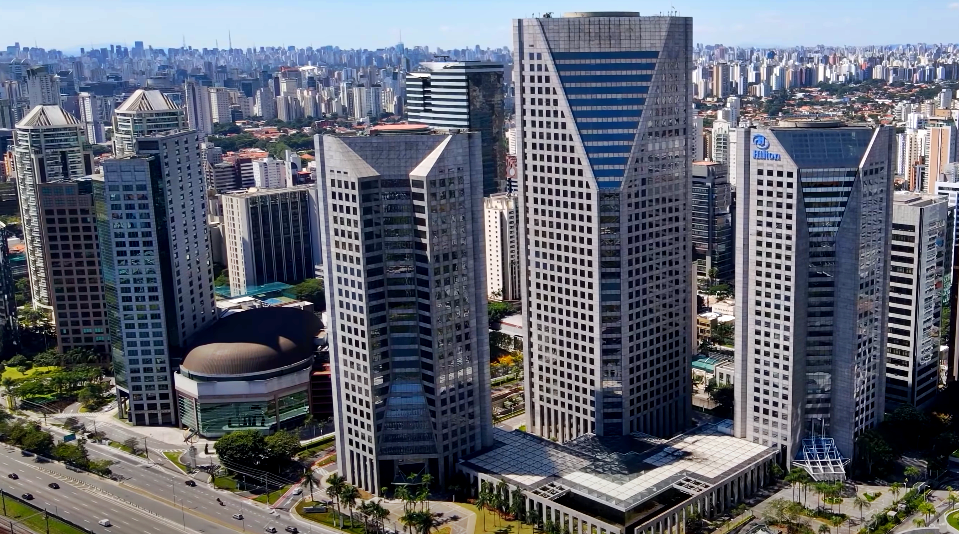
United Nations Business Center at Brooklin Novo

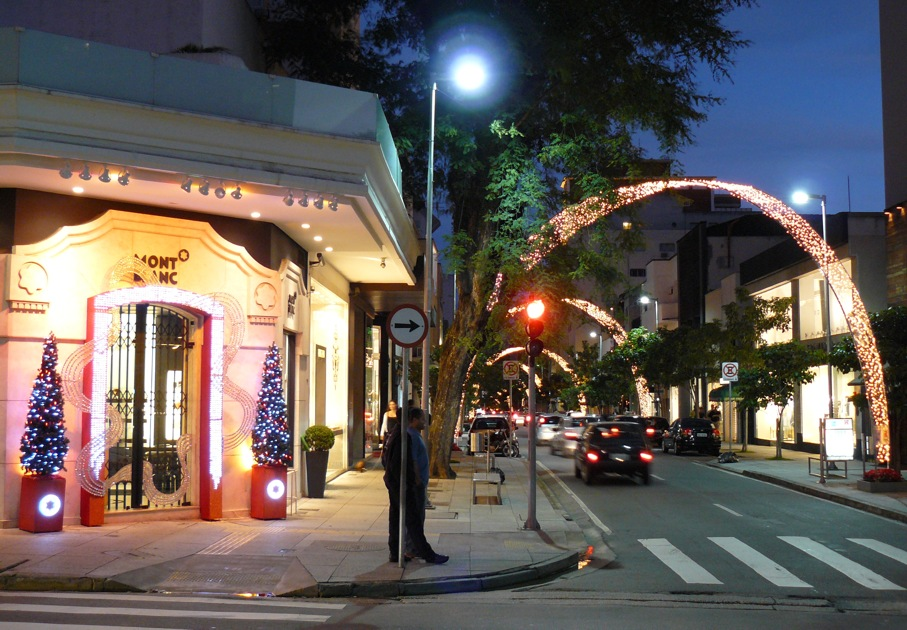
Oscar Freire St., one of the most luxurious streets in Brazil

As of 2014, São Paulo is the third largest exporting municipality in Brazil after Parauapebas, PA and Rio de Janeiro, RJ. In that year São Paulo's exported goods totaled US$7.32B or 3.02% of Brazil's total exports. The top five commodities exported by São Paulo are soybean (21%), raw sugar (19%), coffee (6.5%), sulfate chemical wood pulp (5.6%), and corn (4.4%).

São Paulo's economy is going through a deep transformation. Once a city with a strong industrial character, São Paulo's economy has followed the global trend of shifting to the tertiary sector of the economy, focusing on services. São Paulo also has a large "informal" economy. According to PricewaterhouseCoopers average annual economic growth of the city is 4.2%. In 2005, the city of São Paulo collected R$90 billion in taxes and the city budget was R$15 billion. The city has 1,500 bank branches and 70 shopping malls.

The city is unique among Brazilian cities for its large number of foreign corporations. São Paulo ranked second after New York in FDi magazine's bi-annual ranking of Cities of the Future 2013–14 in the Americas, and was named the Latin American City of the Future 2013–14. According to Mercer's 2011 city rankings of cost of living for expatriate employees, São Paulo is among the ten most expensive cities in the world.

Luxury brands tend to concentrate their business in São Paulo. Because of the lack of department stores and multi-brand boutiques, shopping malls as well as the Jardins district attract most of the world's luxurious brands. Most of the international luxury brands can be found in the Iguatemi, Cidade Jardim or JK shopping malls or on the streets of Oscar Freire, Lorena or Haddock Lobo in the Jardins district. They are home of brands such as Cartier, Chanel, Dior, Giorgio Armani, Gucci, Lis Vuitton, Marc Jacobs, Tiffany & Co. Cidade Jardim was opened in São Paulo in 2008, it is a 45,000-square-meter (484,376-square-foot) mall, landscaped with trees and greenery scenario, with a focus on Brazilian brands but also home to international luxury brands such as Hermès, Jimmy Choo, Pucci and Carolina Herrera. Opened in 2012, JK shopping mall has brought to Brazil brands that were not present in the country before such as Goyard, Tory Burch, Llc., Prada, and Miu Miu.

The Iguatemi Faria Lima, in Faria Lima Avenue, is Brazil's oldest mall, opened in 1966. The Jardins region, which includes the neighbourhoods all comprised within the Subprefecture of Pinheiros.

=== Tourism ===
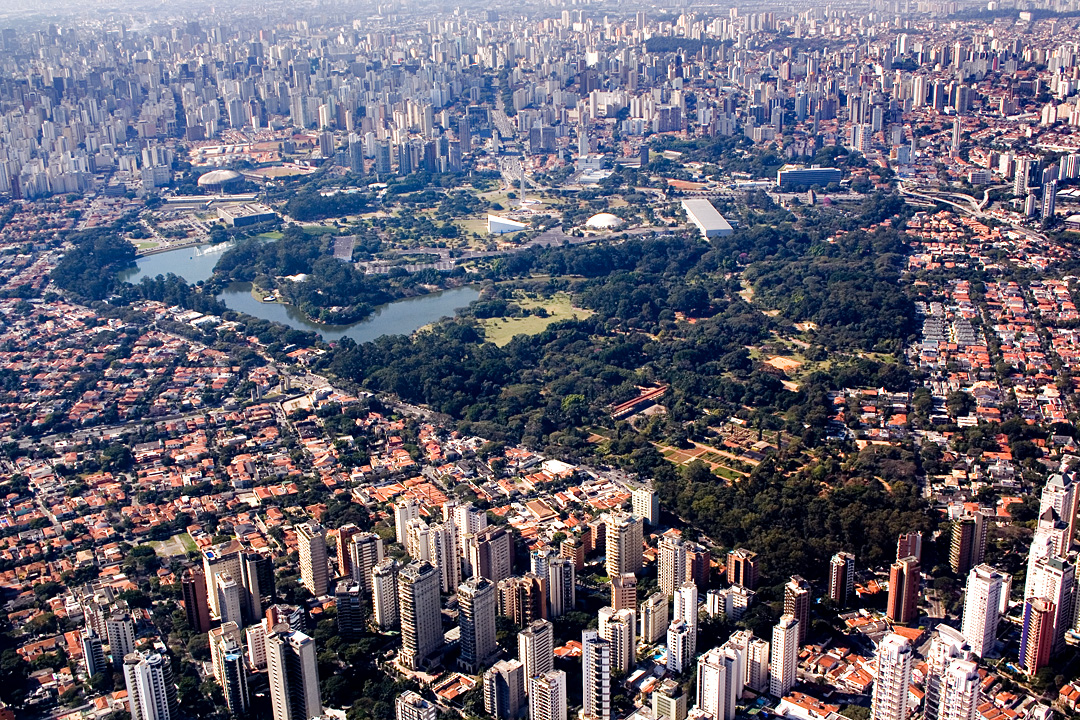
Ibirapuera Park, elected the best in South America by TripAdvisor

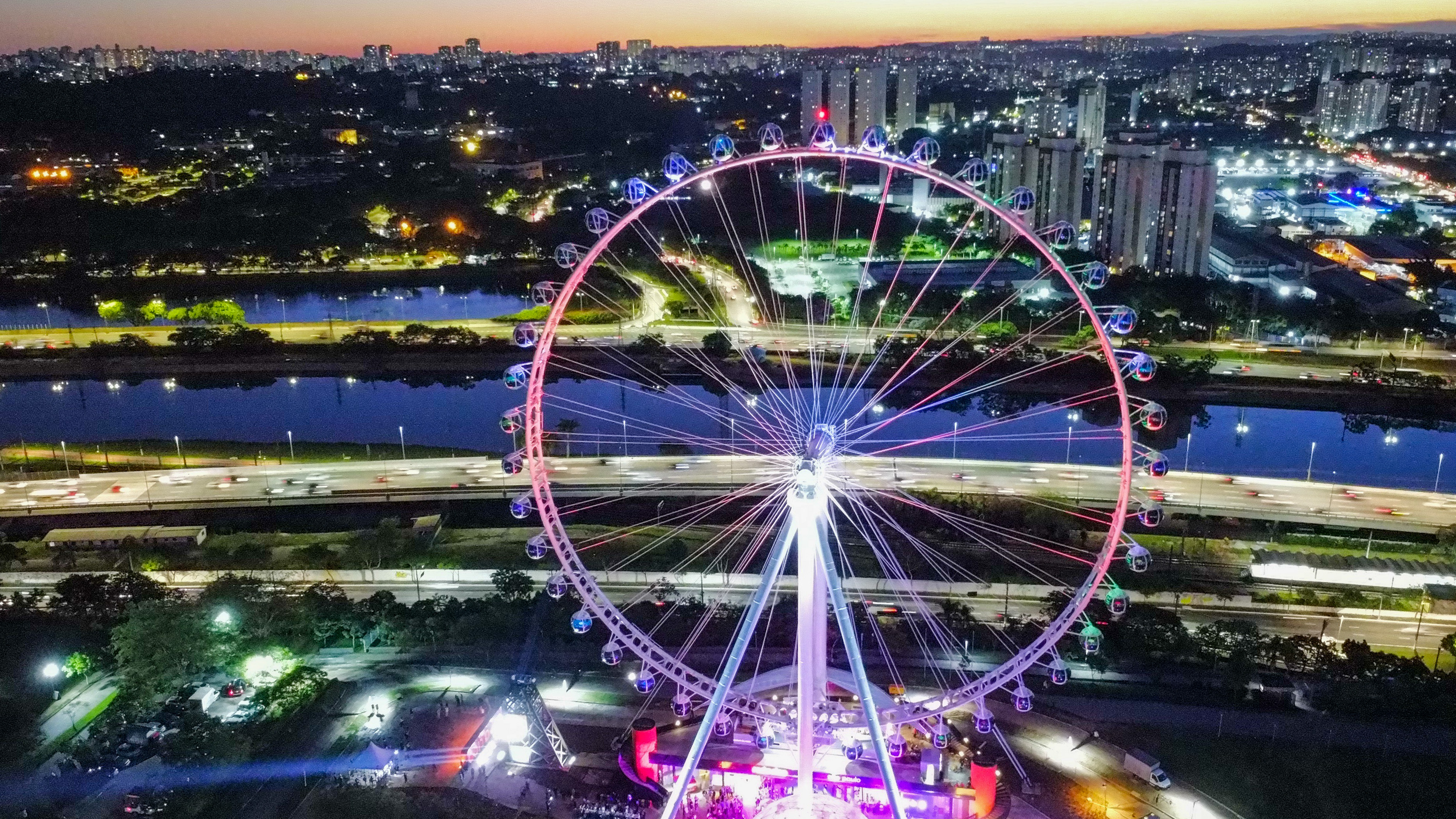
Roda Rico, the tallest observation wheel in Latin America

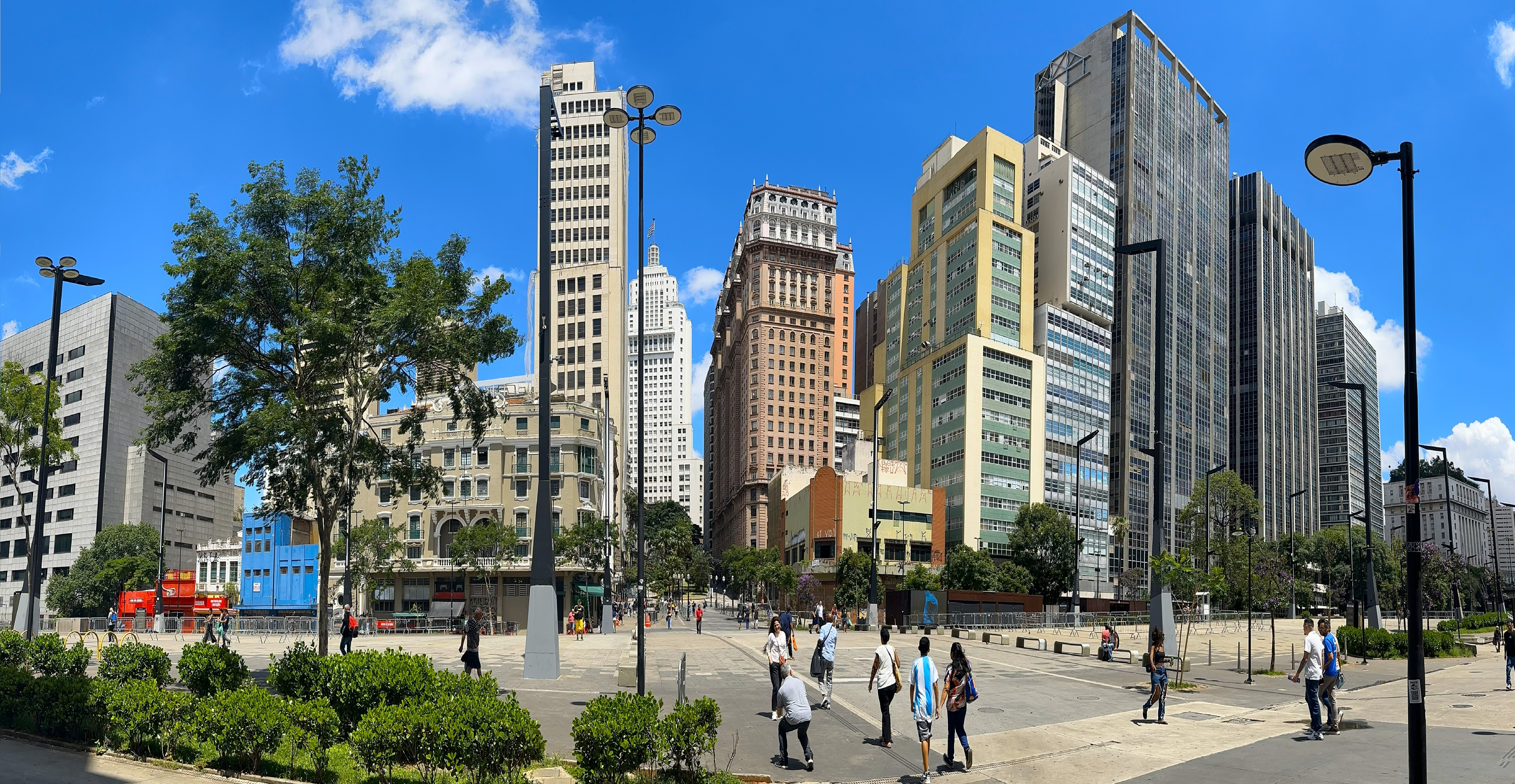
Anhangabaú Valley in the Historic Center

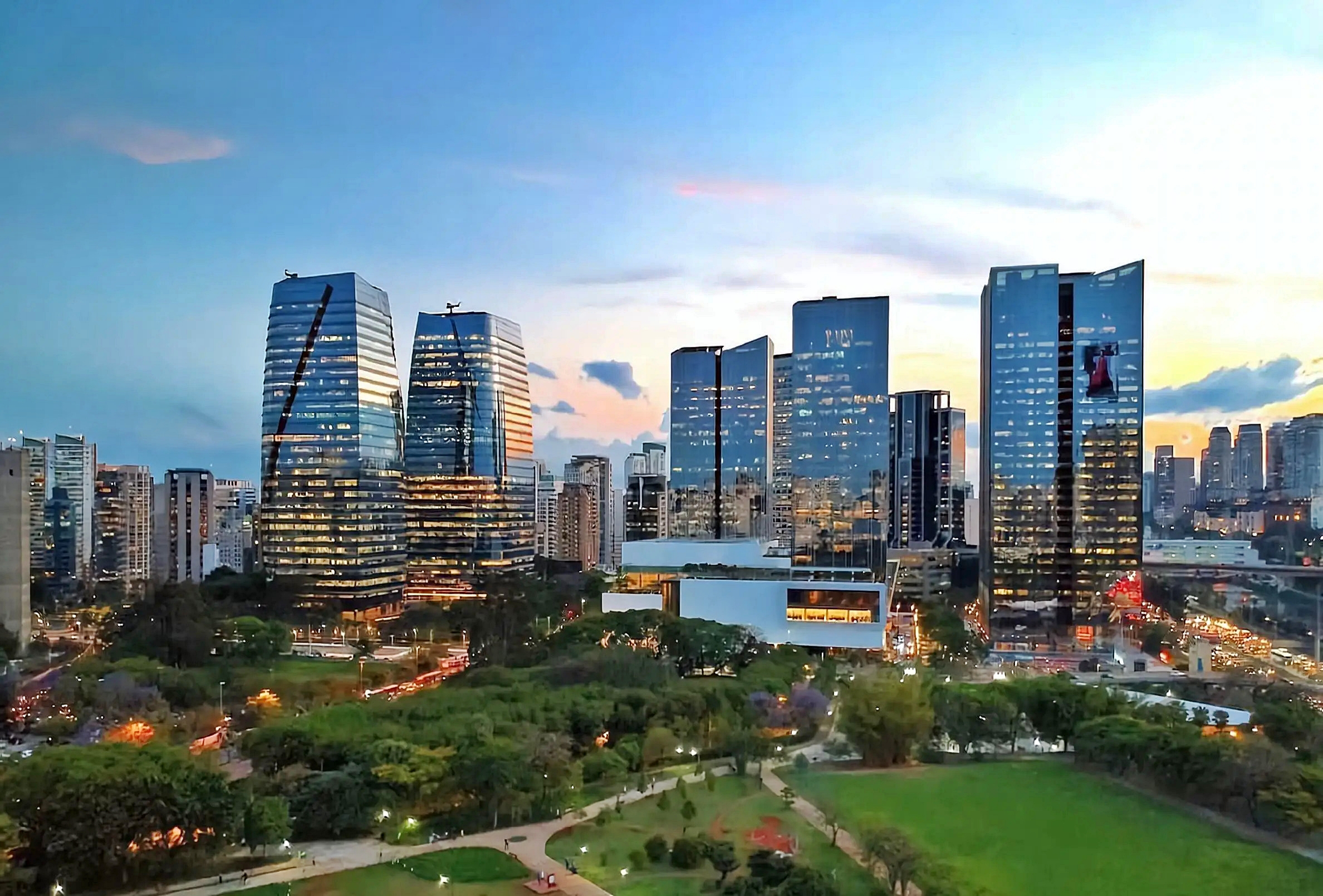
People's Park in Itaim Bibi

Large hotel chains whose target audience is the corporate traveler are in the city. São Paulo is home to 75% of the country's leading business fairs. The city also promotes one of the most important fashion weeks in the world, São Paulo Fashion Week, established in 1996 under the name Morumbi Fashion Brasil, is the largest and most important fashion event in Latin America. Besides, the São Paulo Gay Pride Parade, held since 1997 on Paulista Avenue is the event that attracts more tourists to the city.

The annual March For Jesus is a large gathering of Christians from Protestant churches throughout Brazil, with São Paulo police reporting participation in the range of 350,000 in 2015. In addition, São Paulo hosts the annual São Paulo Pancake Cook-Off in which chefs from across Brazil and the world participate in competitions based on the cooking of pancakes.

São Paulo has been named the 18th best city in the world by the 2026 World's Best Cities Report, standing out among 270 global destinations evaluated by Resonance. The city leads all of Latin America, ahead of Mexico City, Buenos Aires, Rio de Janeiro, Bogotá and Lima.

The city has nightlife considered one of the best in the country, and is an international hub of active and diverse nightlife with bars, dance bars and nightclubs staying open well past midnight. The area offers cinemas, theaters, museums, and cultural centers. The Rua Oscar Freire was named one of the "eight most luxurious streets in the world", according to the Mystery Shopping International, and São Paulo the 25th "most expensive city" of the planet.

According to the International Congress & Convention Association, São Paulo ranks first among the cities that host international events in Americas and the 12th in the world, after Vienna, Paris, Barcelona, Singapore, Berlin, Budapest, Amsterdam, Stockholm, Seoul, Lisbon, and Copenhagen.

According to a study by MasterCard in 130 cities around the world, São Paulo was the third most visited destination in Latin America (behind Mexico City and Buenos Aires) with 2.4 million foreign travelers, who spent US$2.9 billion in 2013 (the highest among the cities in the region). In 2014, CNN ranked nightlife São Paulo as the fourth best in the world, behind New York City, Berlin and Ibiza, in Spain.

The cuisine of the region is another tourist attraction. The city has 62 cuisines across 12,000 restaurants. During the 10th International Congress of Gastronomy, Hospitality and Tourism (Cihat) conducted in 1997, the city received the title of "World Gastronomy Capital" from a commission formed by 43 nations' representatives.

== Infrastructure ==
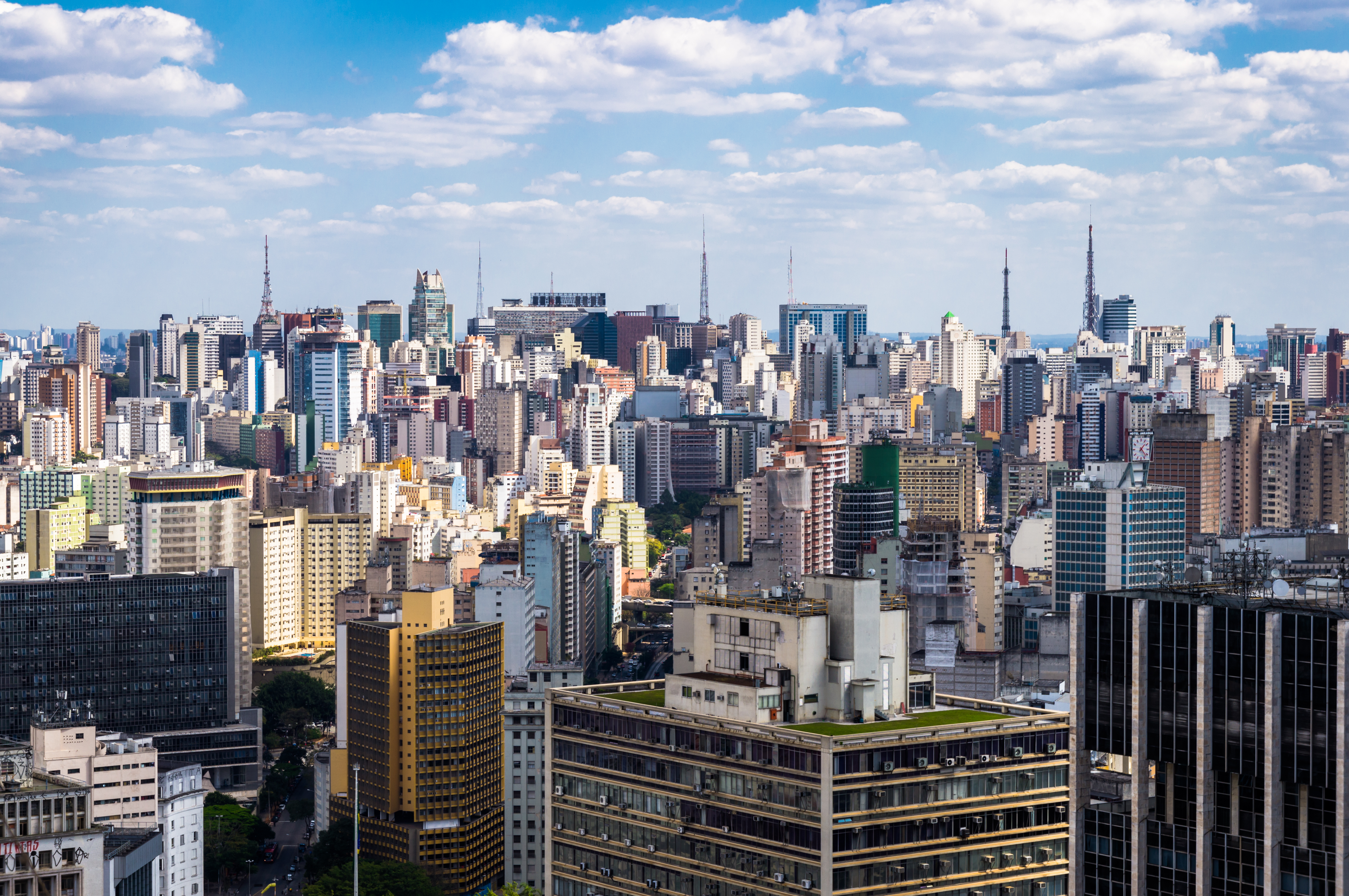
The city view from Altino Arantes Building

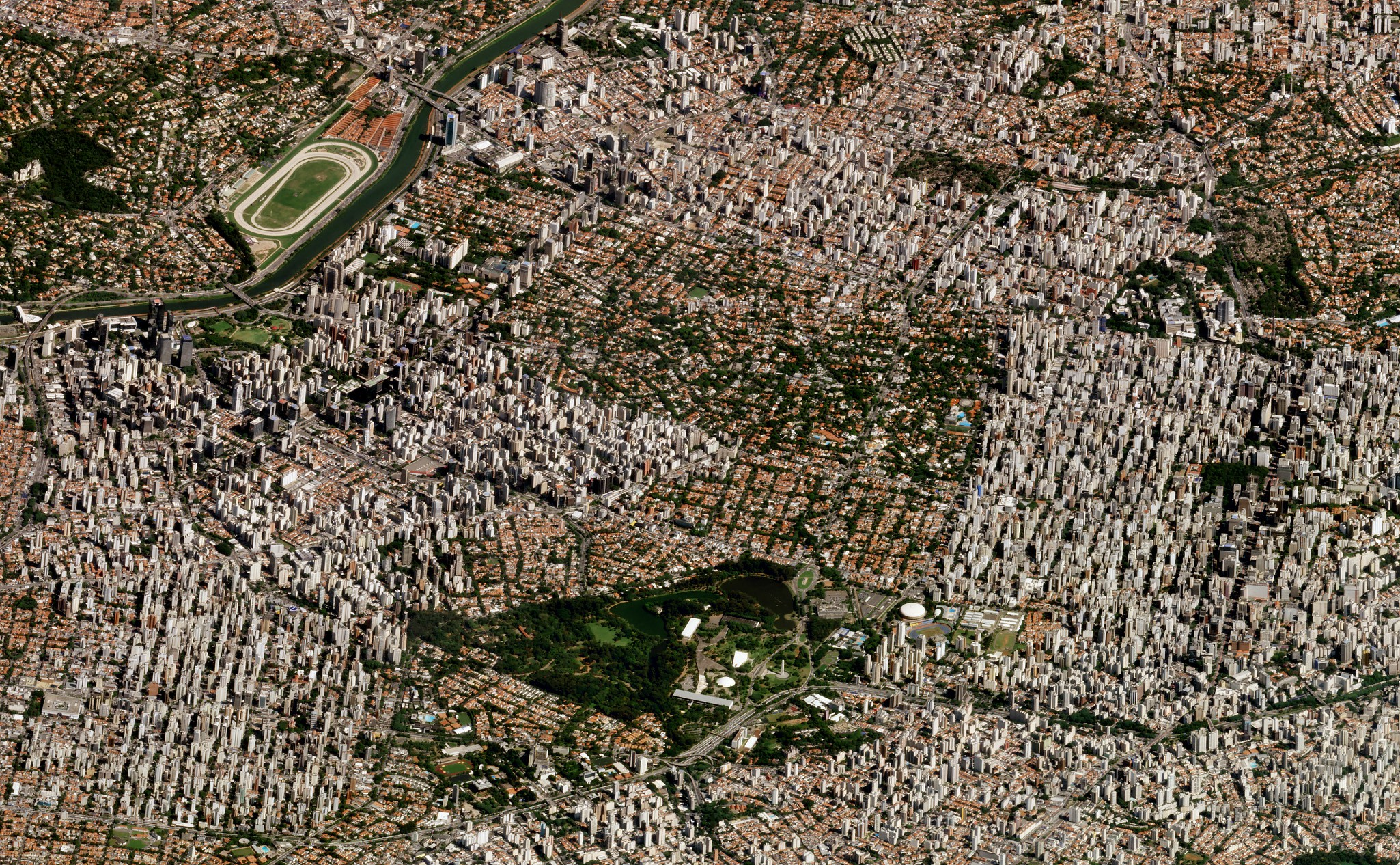
Changes in urban fabrics in the region of Jardins: side by side, vertical areas and low houses

Since the beginning of the 20th century, São Paulo has been one of the main economic centers of Latin America. With the First and Second World Wars and the Great Depression, coffee exports to the United States and Europe were heavily affected, forcing the rich coffee growers to invest in the industrial activities that would make São Paulo the largest industrial center in Brazil. The new job vacancies contributed to attract a significant number of immigrants (mainly from Italy) and migrants, especially from the Northeastern states. From a population of only 32.000 people in 1880, São Paulo now had 8.5 million inhabitants in 1980. The rapid population growth has brought many problems for the city.

According to data from IBGE and Eletropaulo, the electricity grid serves almost 100% of households. The fixed telephony network is still precarious, with coverage of 67.2%. Household garbage collection covers all regions of the municipality but is still insufficient, reaching around 94% of the demand in districts such as Parelheiros and Perus. About 80% of the garbage produced daily by Paulistas is exported to other cities, such as Caieiras and Guarulhos. Recycling accounts for about 1% of the 15,000 metric tons of waste produced daily.

=== Urban planning ===
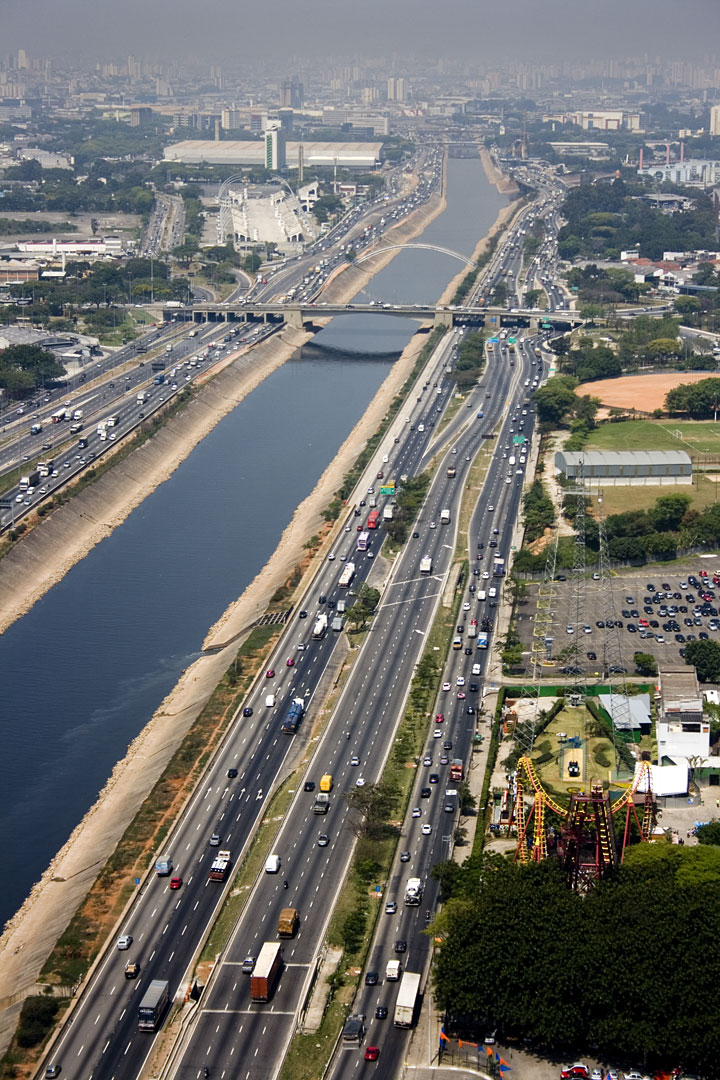
Marginal Tietê, the main expressway of the city

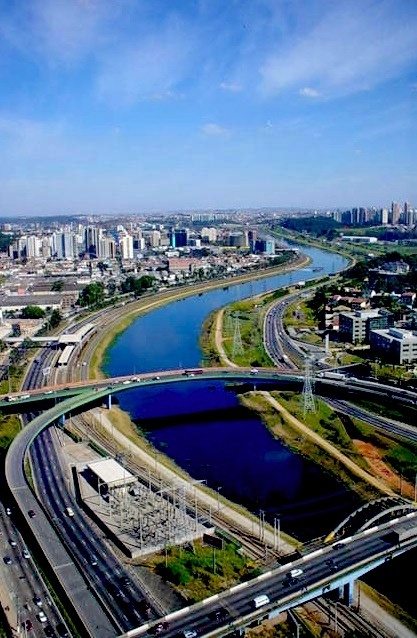
Marginal Pinheiros

The original nuclei of the city are vertical, characterized by the presence of commercial buildings and services. The peripheries are generally developed with two to four-story buildings, though there are exceptions. Compared to other global cities (such as the island cities of New York City and Hong Kong), however, São Paulo is considered a "low-rise building" city. Its tallest buildings rarely reach forty stories, and the average residential building has twenty. Nevertheless, it is the fourth city in the world in quantity of buildings, besides possessing what was considered until 2014 the tallest skyscraper of the country, the Mirante do Vale, also known as Palácio Zarzur Kogan, with 170 meters. Currently the tallest building in the city is Alto Das Nações at 219 meters

Some central regions of the city began to concentrate indigents, drug trafficking, street vending and prostitution, which encouraged the creation of new socio-economic centralities. The characterization of each region of the city also underwent several changes throughout the 20th century. With the relocation of industries to other cities or states, several areas that once housed factory sheds have become commercial or even residential areas.

São Paulo has a history of actions, projects and plans related to urban planning that can be traced to the governments of Antonio da Silva Prado, Baron Duprat, Washington and Luis Francisco Prestes Maia. However, in general, the city was formed during the 20th century, growing from village to metropolis through a series of informal processes and irregular urban sprawl.

Urban growth in São Paulo has followed three patterns since the beginning of the 20th century, according to urban historians: since the late 19th century and until the 1940s, São Paulo was a condensed city in which different social groups lived in a small urban zone separated by type of housing; from the 1940s to the 1980s, São Paulo followed a model of center-periphery social segregation, in which the upper and middle-classes occupied central and modern areas while the poor moved towards precarious, self-built housing in the periphery; and from the 1980s onward, new transformations have brought the social classes closer together in spatial terms, but separated by walls and security technologies that seek to isolate the richer classes in the name of security. Thus, São Paulo differs considerably from other Brazilian cities such as Belo Horizonte and Goiânia, whose initial expansion followed determinations by a plan, or a city like Brasília, whose master plan had been fully developed prior to construction.

The effectiveness of these plans has been seen by some planners and historians as questionable. Some of these scholars argue that such plans were produced exclusively for the benefit of the wealthier strata of the population while the working classes would be relegated to the traditional informal processes. In São Paulo until the mid-1950s, the plans were based on the idea of "demolish and rebuild", including former Mayor Francisco Prestes Maia's road plan for São Paulo (known as the Avenues Plan) or Saturnino de Brito's plan for the Tietê River. The Plan of the Avenues was implemented during the 1920s and sought to build large avenues connecting the city center with the outskirts. This plan included renewing the commercial city center, leading to real estate speculation and gentrification of several city centre districts. The plan also led to the expansion of bus services, which would soon replace the trolley as the preliminary transportation system. This contributed to the outwards expansion of São Paulo and the peripherization of poorer residents. Peripheral districts were usually unregulated and consisted mainly of self-built single-family houses.

In 1968 the Urban Development Plan proposed the Basic Plan for Integrated Development of São Paulo, under the administration of Figueiredo Ferraz. The main result was zoning laws. It lasted until 2004 when the Basic Plan was replaced by the current Master Plan. That zoning, adopted in 1972, designated "Z1" areas (residential areas designed for elites) and "Z3" (a "mixed zone" lacking clear definitions about their characteristics). Zoning encouraged the growth of suburbs with minimal control and major speculation. After the 1970s peripheral lot regulation increased and infrastructure in the periphery improved, driving land prices up. The poorest and the newcomers now could not purchase their lot and build their house, and were forced to look for a housing alternative. As a result, favelas and precarious tenements (cortiços) appeared. These housing types were often closer to the city's center: favelas could sprawl in any unused terrain (often dangerous or unsanitary) and decaying or abandoned buildings for tenements were abundant inside the city. Favelas went back into the urban perimeter, occupying the small lots not yet occupied by urbanization – alongside polluted rivers, railways, or between bridges. By 1993, 19.8% of São Paulo's population lived in favelas, compared to 5.2% in 1980. Today, it is estimated that 2.1 million Paulistas live in favelas, which represents about 11% of the metropolitan area's population.

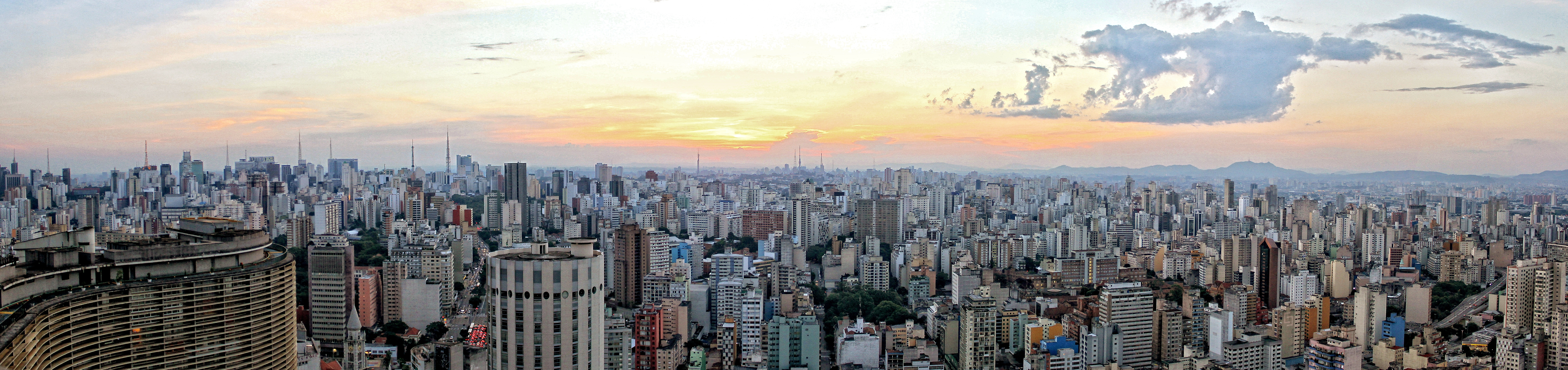
Panoramic view of Central Zone of São Paulo from Italy Building

=== Transport ===
==== Airports ====
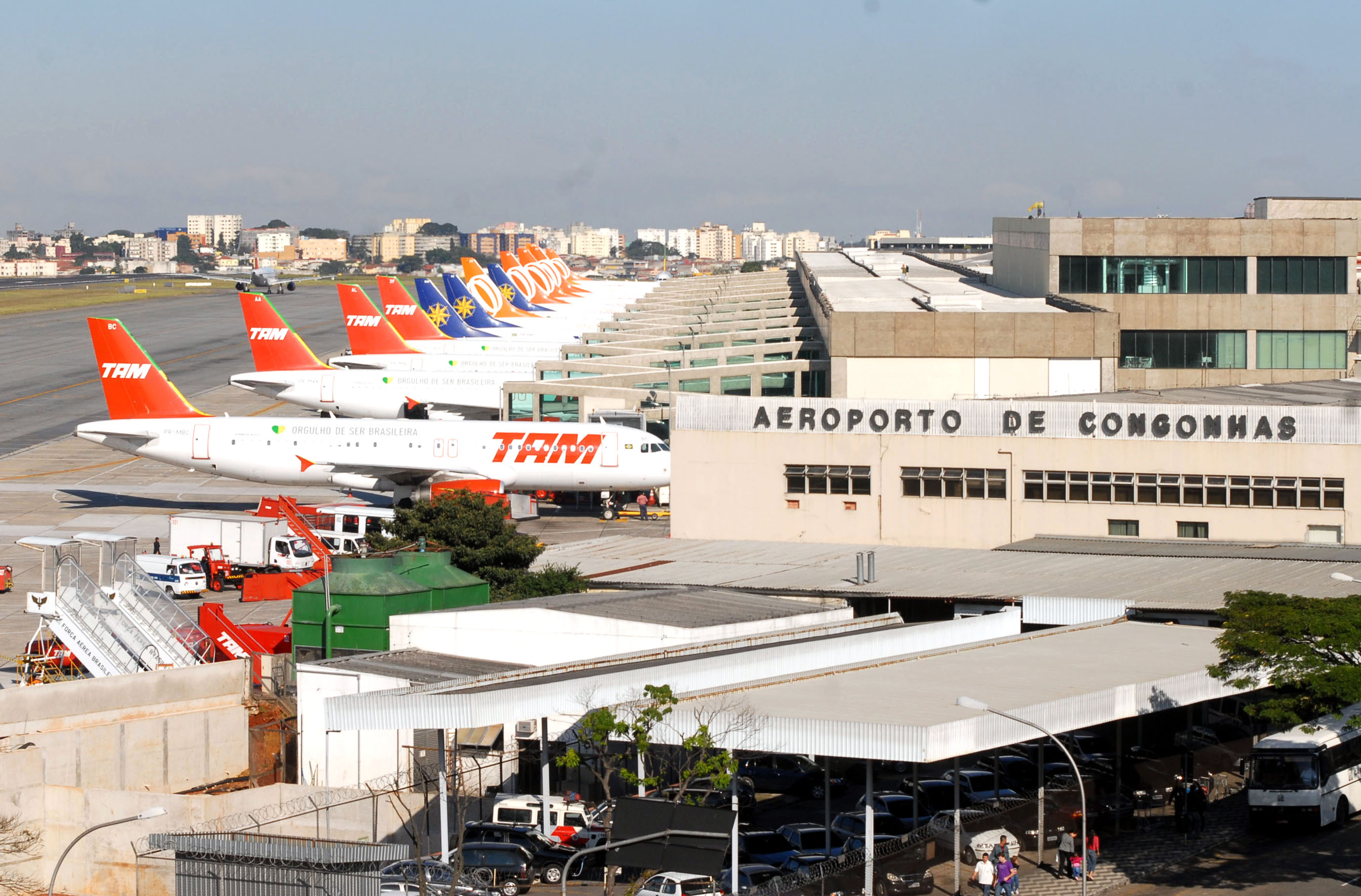
São Paulo–Congonhas Airport

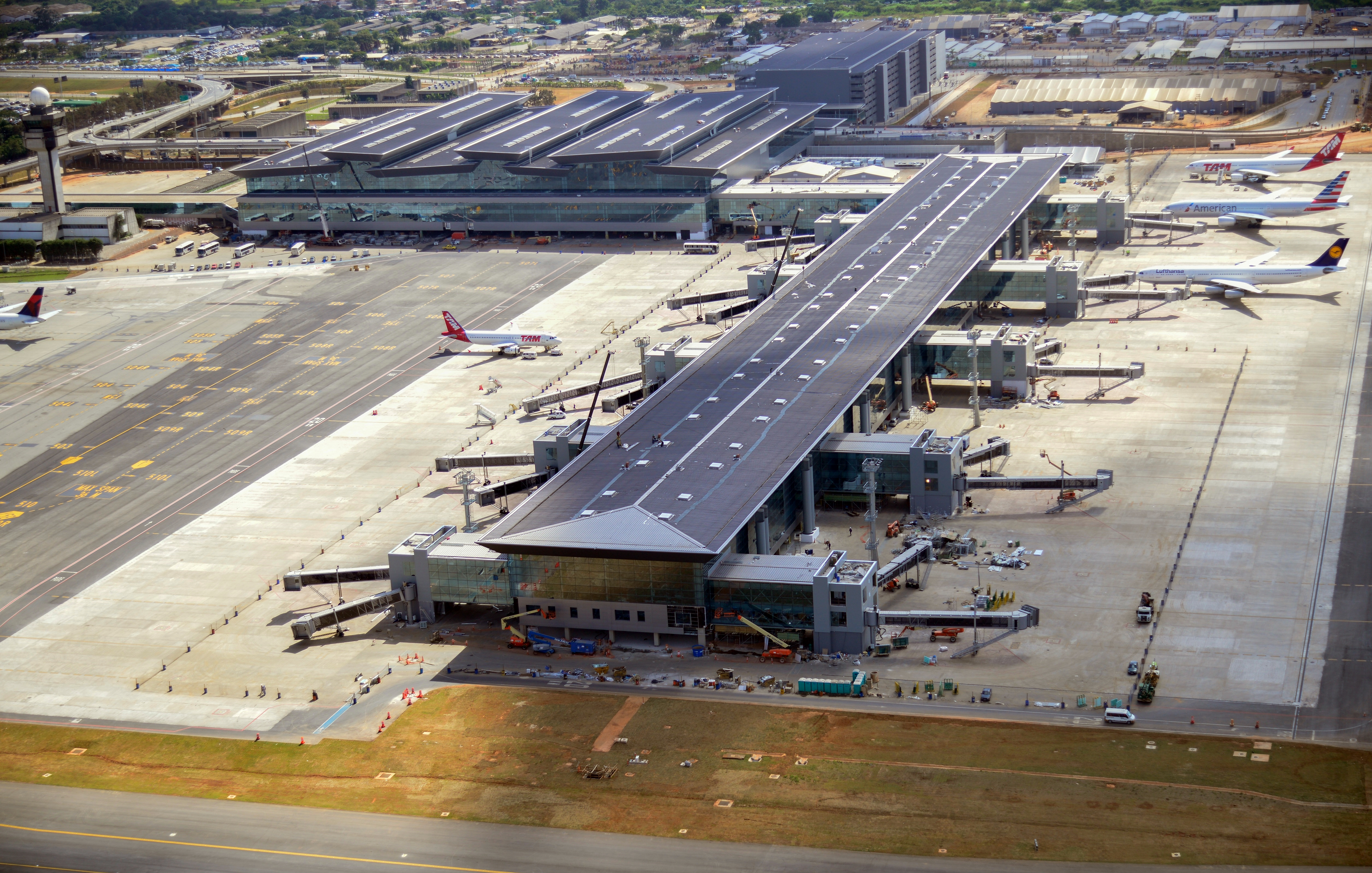
São Paulo/Guarulhos International Airport

São Paulo has two main airports, São Paulo/Guarulhos International Airport for international flights and national hub, and São Paulo–Congonhas Airport for domestic and regional flights. Another airport, the Campo de Marte Airport, serves private jets and light aircraft. The three airports together moved more than 58,000,000 passengers in 2015, making São Paulo one of the top 15 busiest in the world, by number of air passenger movements. The region of Greater São Paulo is also served by Viracopos International Airport, São José dos Campos Airport and Jundiaí Airport.

Congonhas Airport operates flights mainly to Rio de Janeiro, Porto Alegre, Belo Horizonte and Brasília. Built in the 1930s, it was designed to handle the increasing demand for flights, in the fastest growing city in the world. Located in Campo Belo District, Congonhas Airport is close to the three main city's financial districts: Paulista Avenue, Brigadeiro Faria Lima Avenue and Engenheiro Luís Carlos Berrini Avenue.

The São Paulo–Guarulhos International, also known as "Cumbica", is 25 km (16 mi) north-east of the city center, in the Guarulhos municipality. Every day nearly 110.000 people pass through the airport, which connects Brazil to 36 countries around the world. 370 companies operate there, generating more than 53.000 jobs. The international airport is connected to the metropolitan rail system, with Line 13 (CPTM).

Campo de Marte is in Santana district, the northern zone of São Paulo. The airport handles private flights and air shuttles, including air taxi firms. Opened in 1935, Campo de Marte is the base for the largest helicopter fleet in Brazil and the world's, ahead of New York and Tokyo. This airport is the home base of the State Civil Police Air Tactical Unit, the State Military Police Radio Patrol Unit and the São Paulo Flying Club. From this airport, passengers can take advantage of some 350 remote helipads and heliports to bypass heavy road traffic.

==== Roads ====
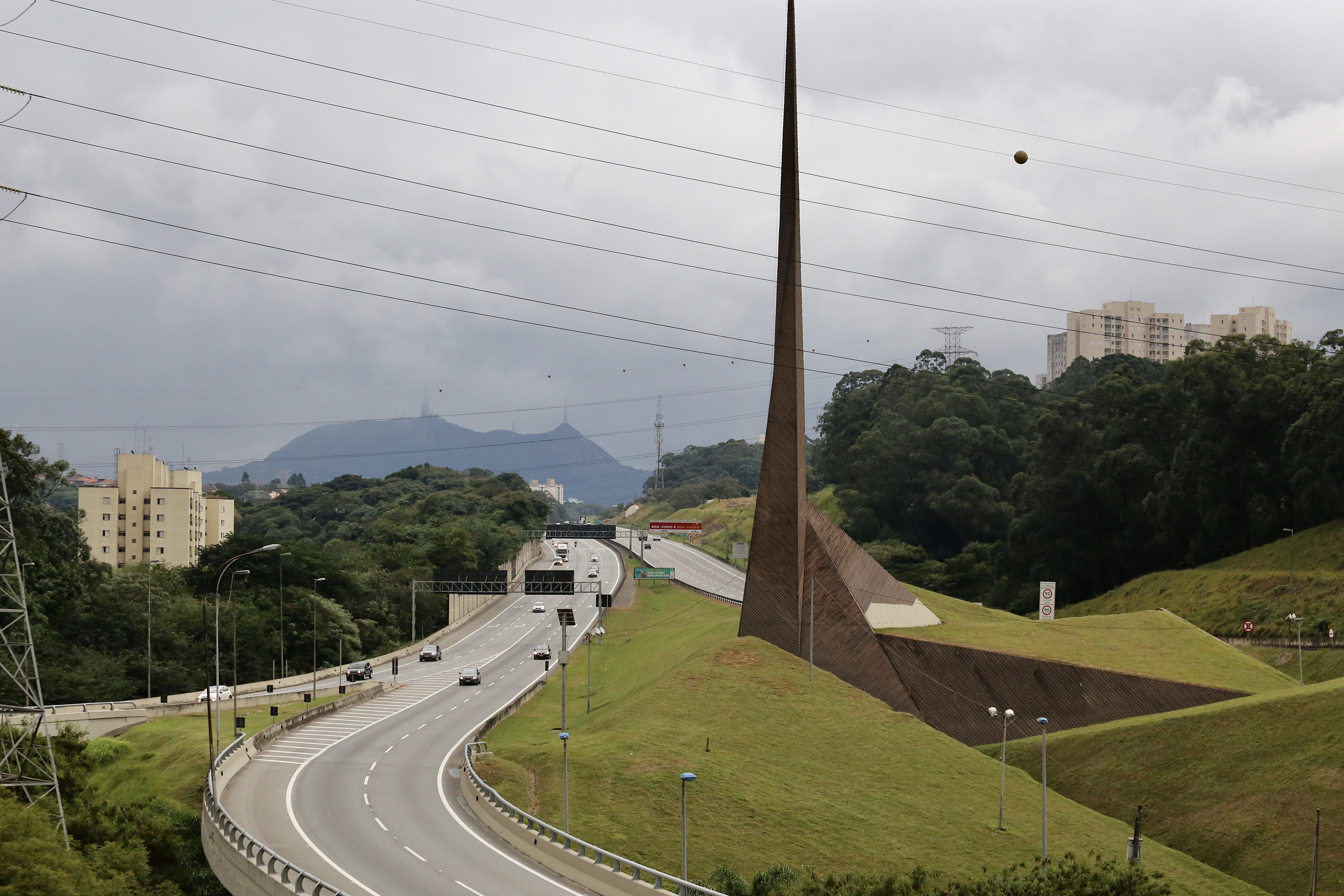
Bandeirantes Highway/SP-348

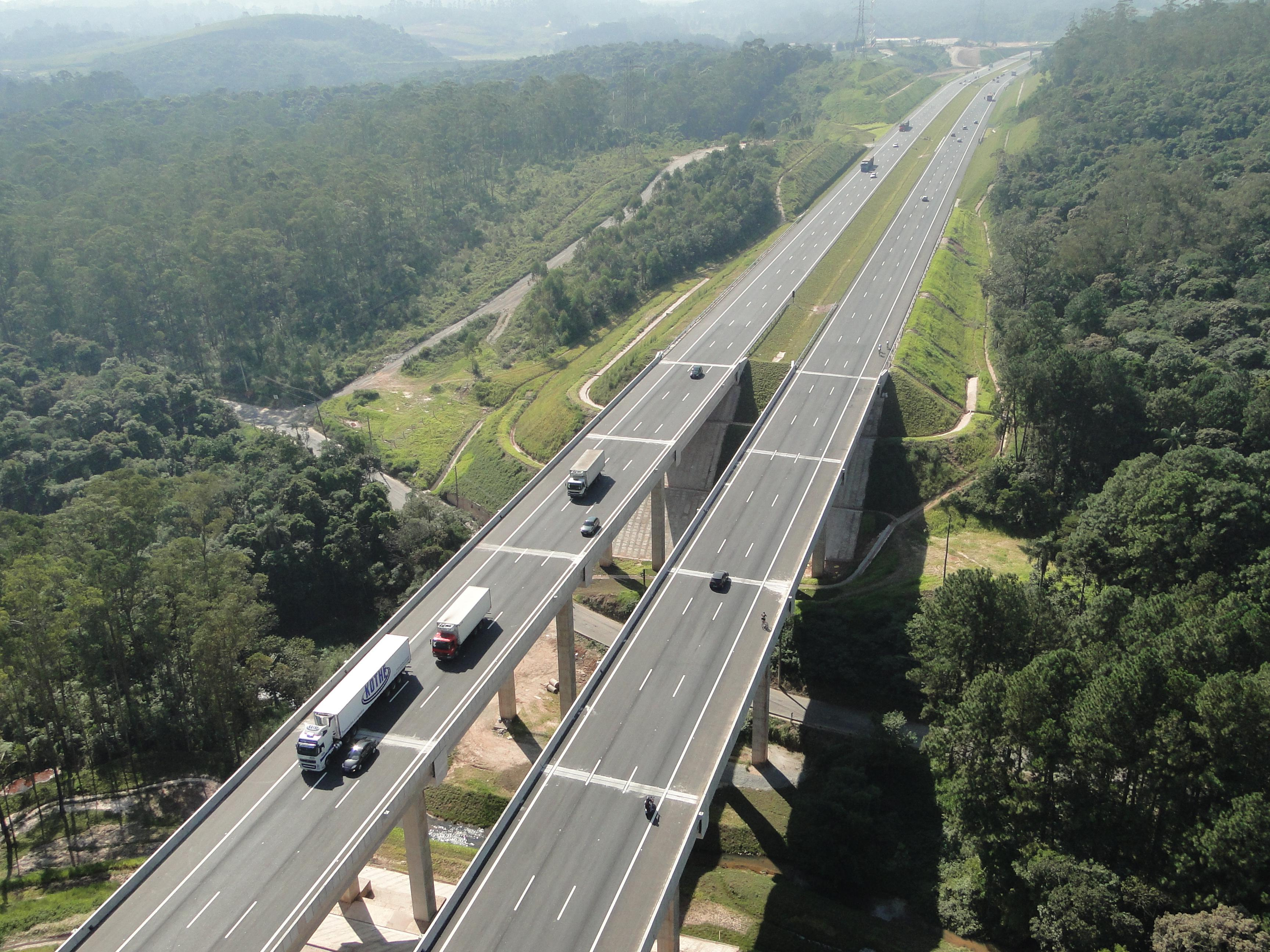
Mario Covas Beltway

Automobiles are the main means to get into the city. In March 2011, more than 7 million vehicles were registered. Heavy traffic is common on the city's main avenues and traffic jams are relatively common on its highways.

The city is crossed by 10 major motorways: President Dutra Highway/BR-116 (connects São Paulo to the east and north-east of the country); Régis Bittencourt Highway/BR-116 (connects São Paulo to the south of the country); Fernão Dias Highway/BR-381 (connects São Paulo to the north of the country); Anchieta Highway/SP-150 (connects São Paulo to the ocean coast); Immigrants Highway/SP-150 (connects São Paulo to the ocean coast); President Castelo Branco Highway/SP-280 (connects São Paulo to the west and north-west of the country); Raposo Tavares Highway/SP-270 (connects São Paulo to the west of the country); Anhanguera Highway/SP-330 (connects São Paulo to the north-west of the country, including its capital city); Bandeirantes Highway/SP-348 (connects São Paulo to the north-west of the country); Ayrton Senna Highway/SP-70 (named after Brazilian Formula One driver Ayrton Senna, the motorway connects São Paulo to east locations of the state, as well as the north coast of the state).

The Rodoanel Mário Covas (official designation SP-021) is the beltway of the Greater São Paulo. Upon its completion, it will have a length of 177 km (110 mi), with a radius of approximately 23 km (14 mi) from the geographical center of the city. It was named after Mário Covas, who was mayor of the city of São Paulo (1983–1985) and a state governor (1994–1998/1998–2001) until his death from cancer. It is a controlled access highway with a speed limit of 100 km/h (62 mph) under normal weather and traffic circumstances. The west, south and east parts are completed, and the north part, which will close the beltway, is due in 2026 and is being built by DERSA.

==== Buses ====
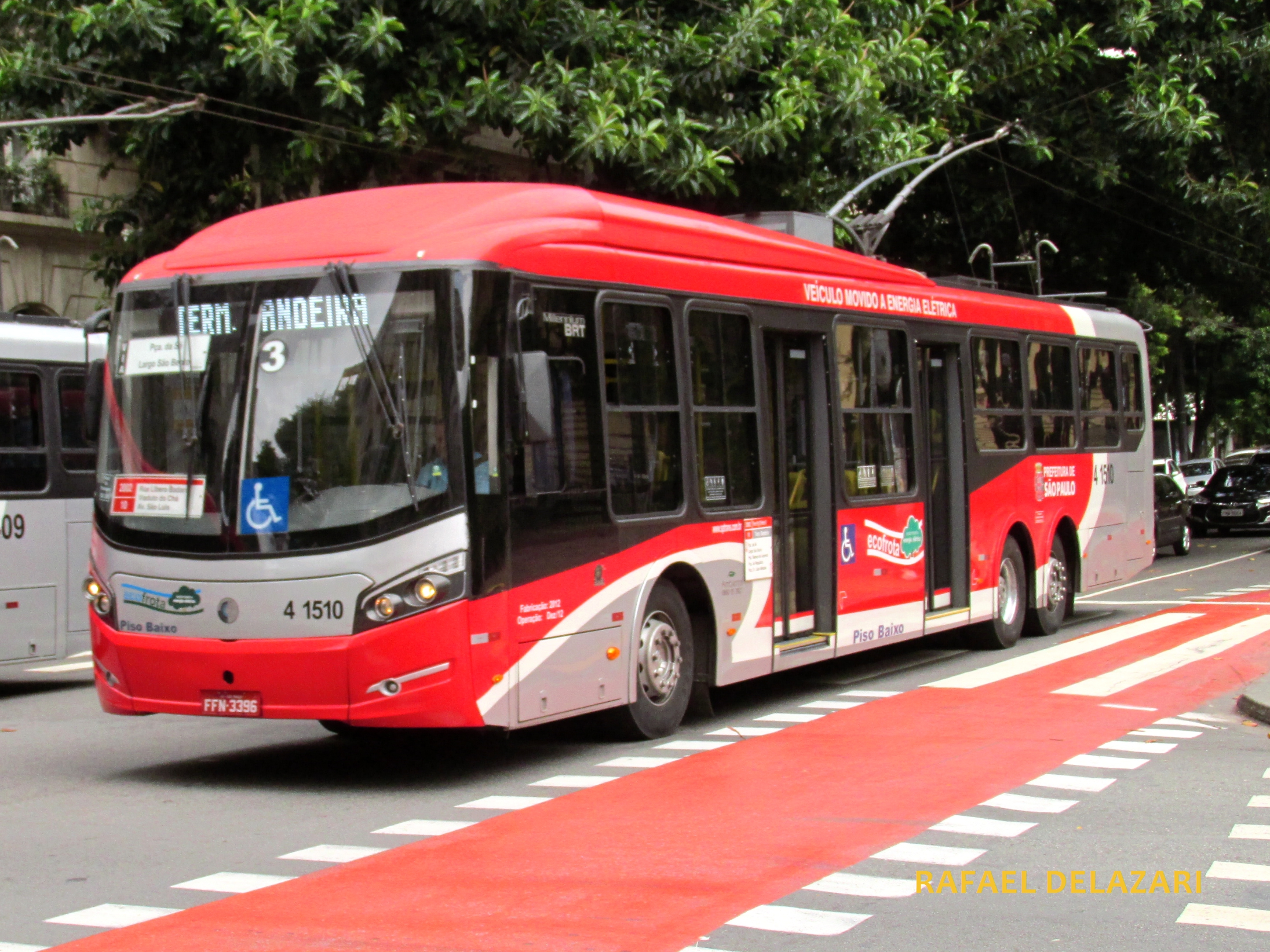
São Paulo has two independent trolleybus systems.

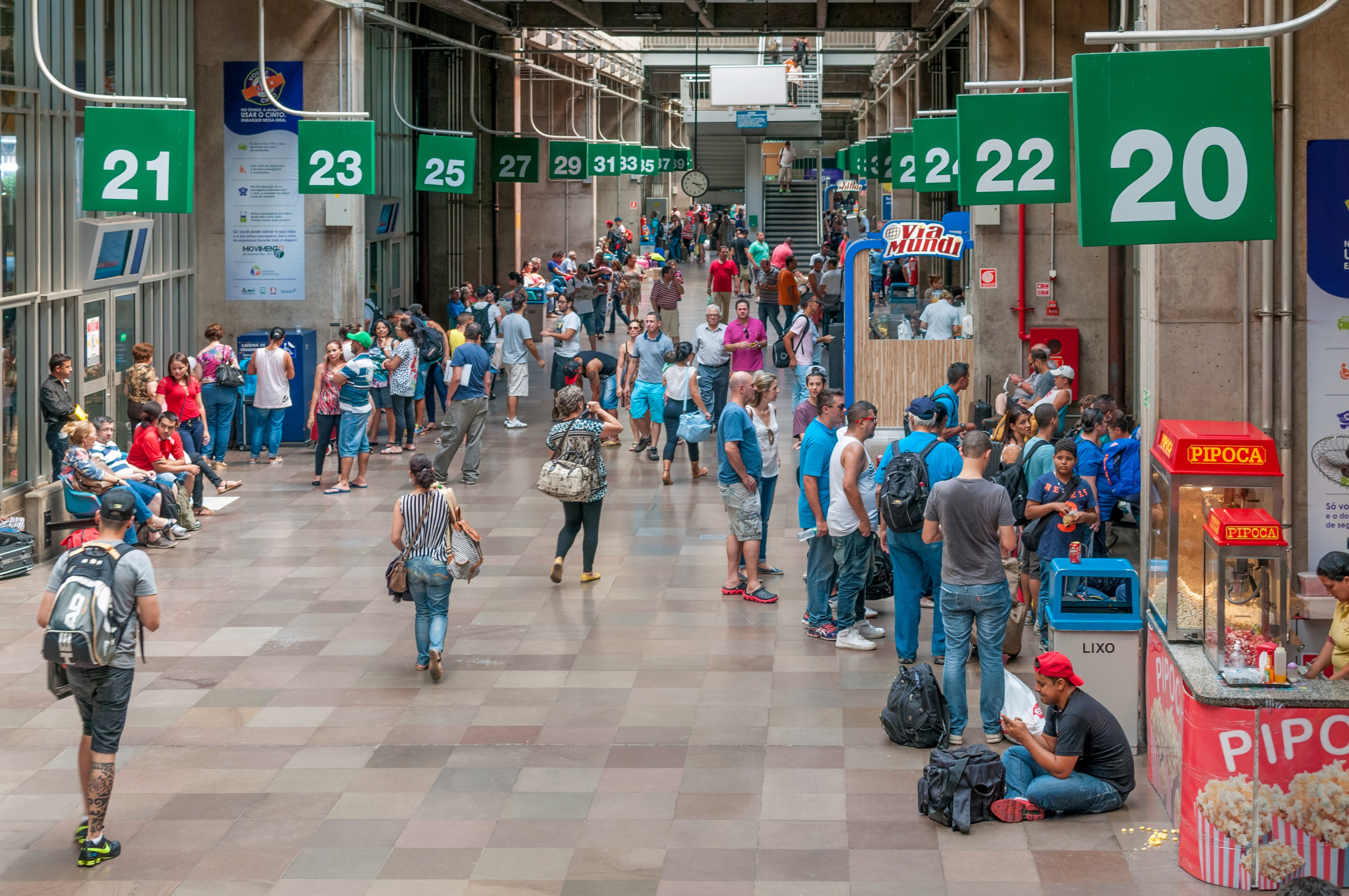
Tietê Bus Terminal, the 2nd busiest bus terminal in the world, after PABT

Bus transport (government and private) is composed of 17,000 buses (including about 290 trolley buses). The traditional system of informal transport (dab vans) was later reorganized and legalized. The trolleybus systems provide a portion of the public transport service in Greater São Paulo with two independent networks. The SPTrans (São Paulo Transportes) system opened in 1949 and serves the city of São Paulo, while the Empresa Metropolitana de Transportes Urbanos de São Paulo (EMTU) system opened in 1988 and serves suburban areas to the southeast of the city proper. Worldwide, São Paulo is one of only two metropolitan areas possessing two independent trolleybus systems, the other being Naples, Italy.

São Paulo Tietê Bus Terminal is the second largest bus terminal in the world, after PABT in New York. It serves localities across the nation, with the exception of the states of Amazonas, Roraima and Amapá. Routes to 1,010 cities in five countries (Brazil, Argentina, Chile, Uruguay and Paraguay) are available. It connects to all regional airports and a ride sharing automobile service to Santos.

The Palmeiras-Barra Funda Intermodal Terminal is much smaller and is connected to the Palmeiras-Barra Funda metro and Palmeiras-Barra Funda CPTM stations. It serves the southwestern cities of Sorocaba, Itapetininga, Itu, Botucatu, Bauru, Marília, Jaú, Avaré, Piraju, Santa Cruz do Rio Pardo, Ipaussu, Chavantes and Ourinhos (on the border with Paraná State). It also serves São José do Rio Preto, Araçatuba and other small towns on the northwest of São Paulo State.

==== Urban rail ====
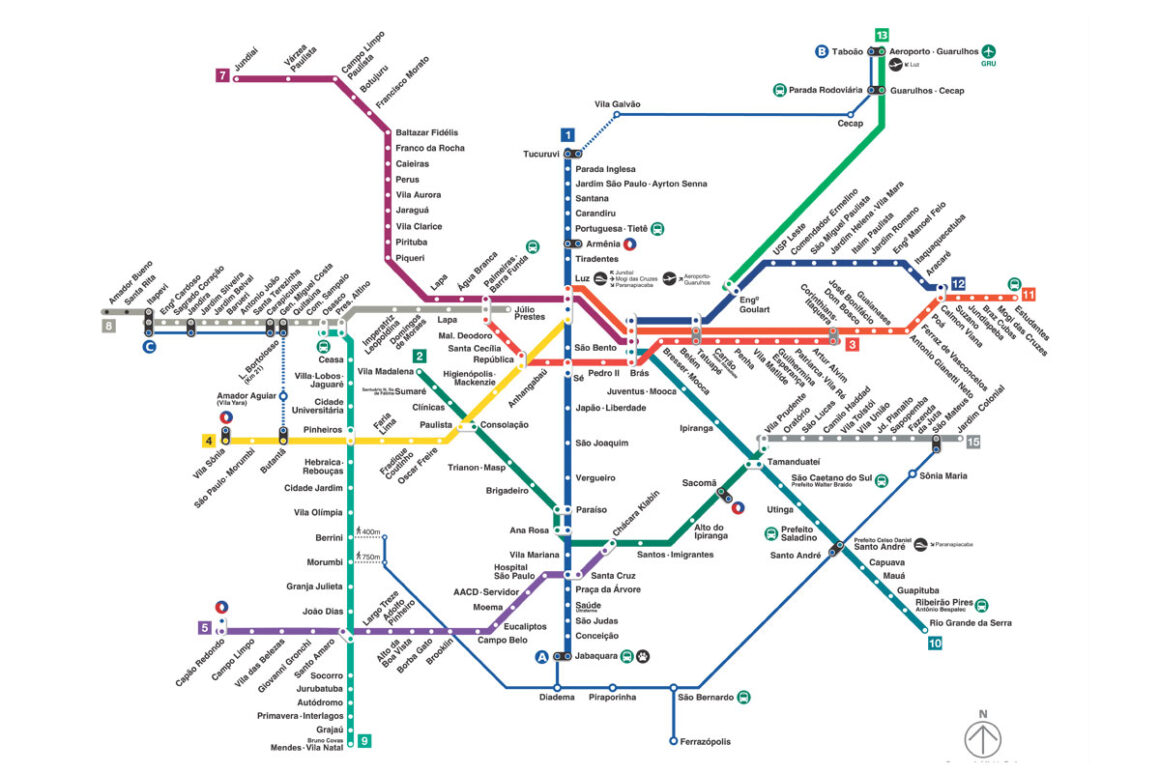
Map of the 377 km (234 mi) urban rail network of the city (São Paulo Metro and CPTM)

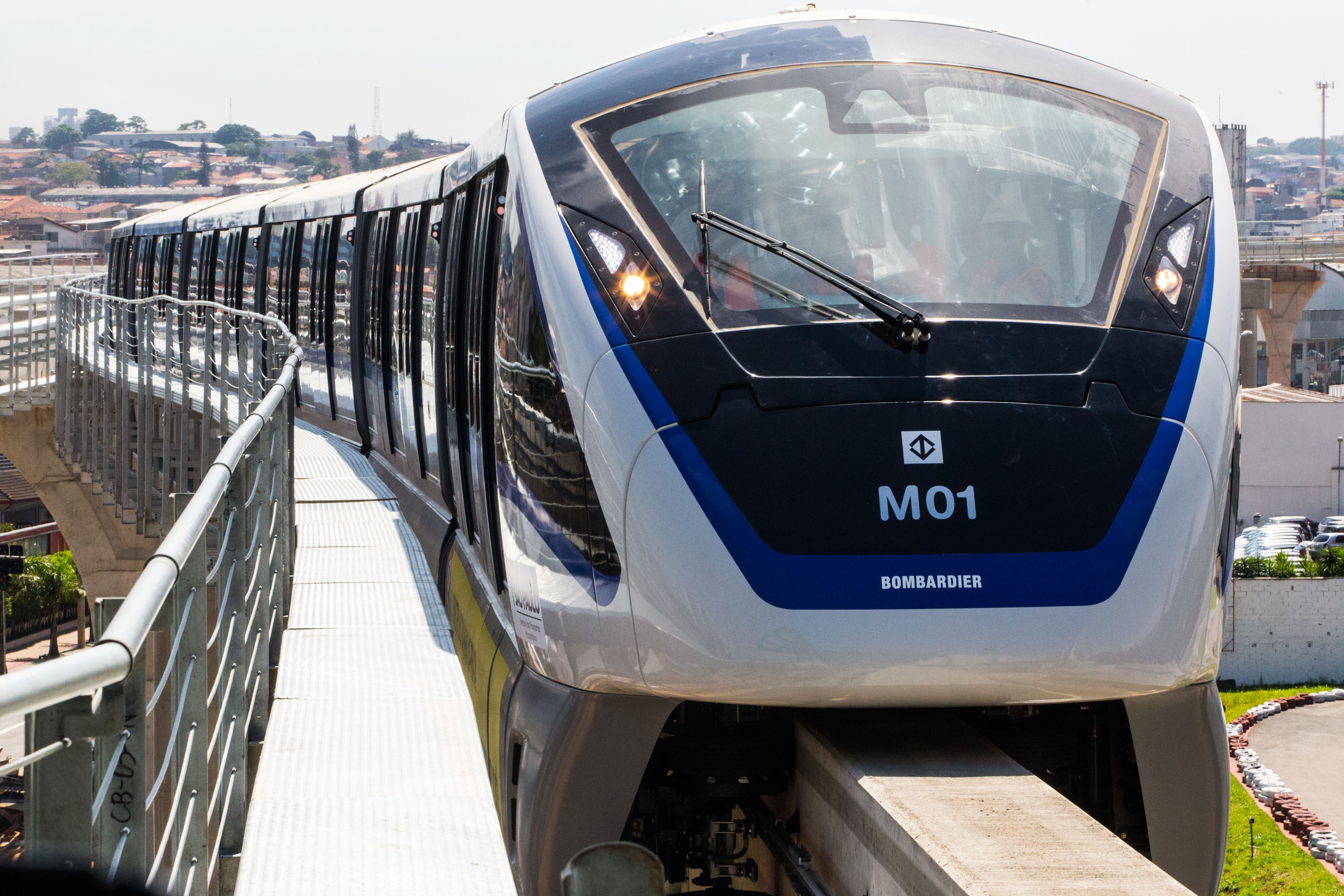
Monorail of the Line 15 (Silver) of the São Paulo Metro

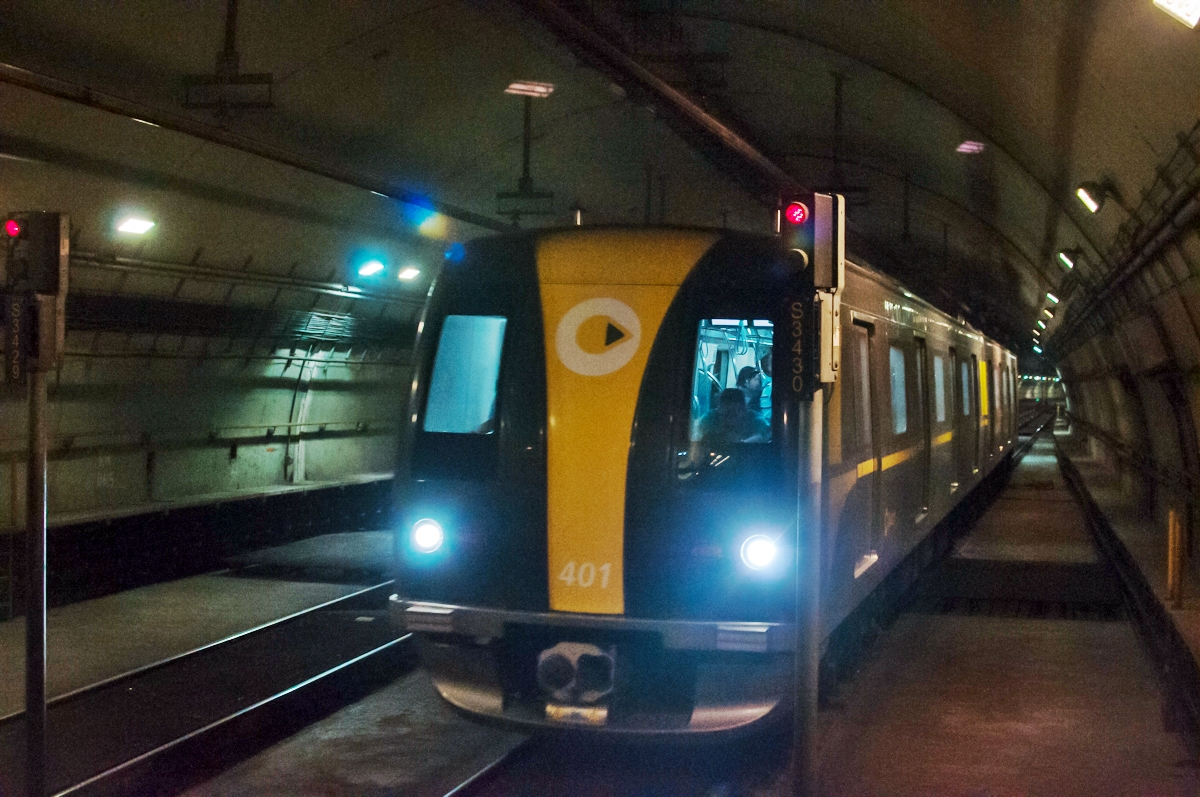
Train of the Line 4 (Yellow) of the São Paulo Metro

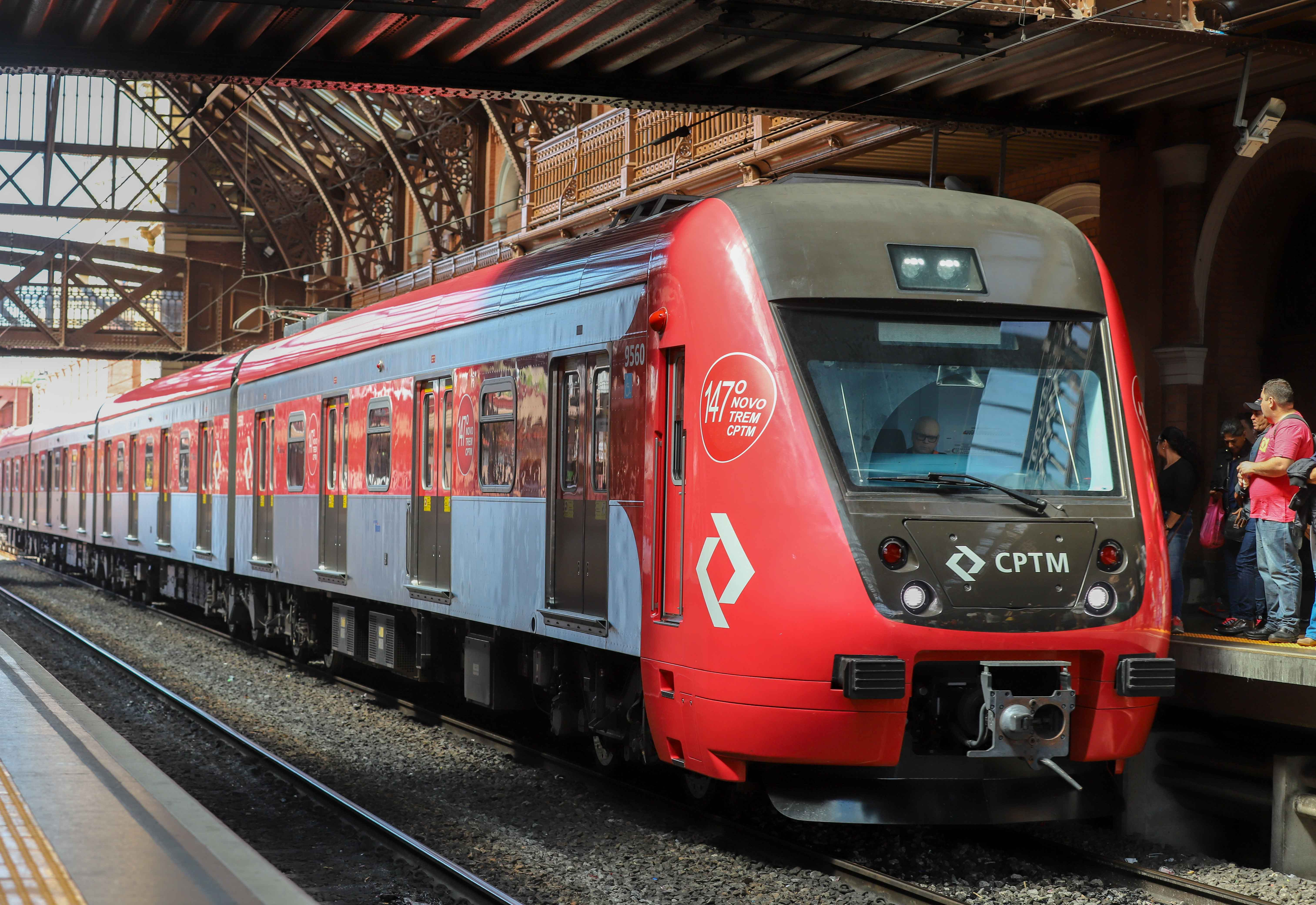
Train of the CPTM at Luz Station

São Paulo has an urban rail transit system (São Paulo Metro and São Paulo Metropolitan Trains) that serves 184 stations and has 377 km (234 mi) of track, forming the largest metropolitan rail transport network of Latin America. The underground and urban railway lines together carry some 7 million people on an average weekday.

The São Paulo Metro operates 104 km (65 mi) of rapid transit system, with six lines in operation, serving 91 stations. In 2015, the metro reached the mark of 11.5 million passengers per mile of line, 15% higher than in 2008, when 10 million users were taken per mile. It is the largest concentration of people in a single transport system in the world, according to the company. In 2014, the São Paulo Metro was elected the best metro system in the Americas.

The company ViaQuatro, a private concessionaire, operates the Line 4 of the metro system. The Line 15 (Silver) is the first mass-transit monorail of the South America and the first system in the world to use the Bombardier Innovia Monorail 300. When fully completed will be the largest and highest capacity monorail system in the Americas and second worldwide, only behind to the Chongqing Monorail.

The Companhia Paulista de Trens Metropolitanos (CPTM, or "Paulista Company of Metropolitan Trains") railway add 273.0 km (169.6 mi) of commuter rail, with seven lines and 94 stations. The system carries about 2.8 million passengers a day. On 8 June 2018, CPTM set a weekday ridership record with 3,096,035 trips. The Line 13 (Jade) of the CPTM connects São Paulo to the São Paulo–Guarulhos International Airport, in the municipality of Guarulhos, the first major international airport in South America to be directly served by train.

CCR Group (through the ViaQuatro and ViaMobilidade concessionaires) operates subway lines 4–Yellow and 5–Lilac, in addition to managing (through the ViaMobilidade concessionaire) lines 8-Diamond and 9-Emerald of the metropolitan train system. Metro and metropolitan train networks transport an average of nearly 7 million people a day, while another 2 million passengers are transported by EMTU buses daily.

The two major São Paulo railway stations are Luz and Júlio Prestes in the Luz/Campos Eliseos region. Julio Prestes Station connected Southwest São Paulo State and Northern Paraná State to São Paulo City. Agricultural products were transferred to Luz Station from which they headed to the Atlantic Ocean and overseas. Júlio Prestes stopped transporting passengers through the Sorocabana or FEPASA lines and now only has metro service. Due to its acoustics and interior beauty, surrounded by Greek revival columns, part of the rebuilt station was transformed into the São Paulo Hall.

Luz Station was built in Britain and assembled in Brazil. It has an underground station and is still active with metro lines that link São Paulo to the Greater São Paulo region to the East and the Campinas Metropolitan region in Jundiaí in the western part of the State. Luz Station is surrounded by important cultural institutions such as the Pinacoteca do Estado, The Museu de Arte Sacra on Tiradentes Avenue and Jardim da Luz, among others. It is the seat of the Santos-Jundiaí line which historically transported international immigrants from the Port of Santos to São Paulo and the coffee plantation lands in the Western region of Campinas. São Paulo has no tram lines, although trams were common in the first half of the 20th century.

== Culture ==
=== Music ===
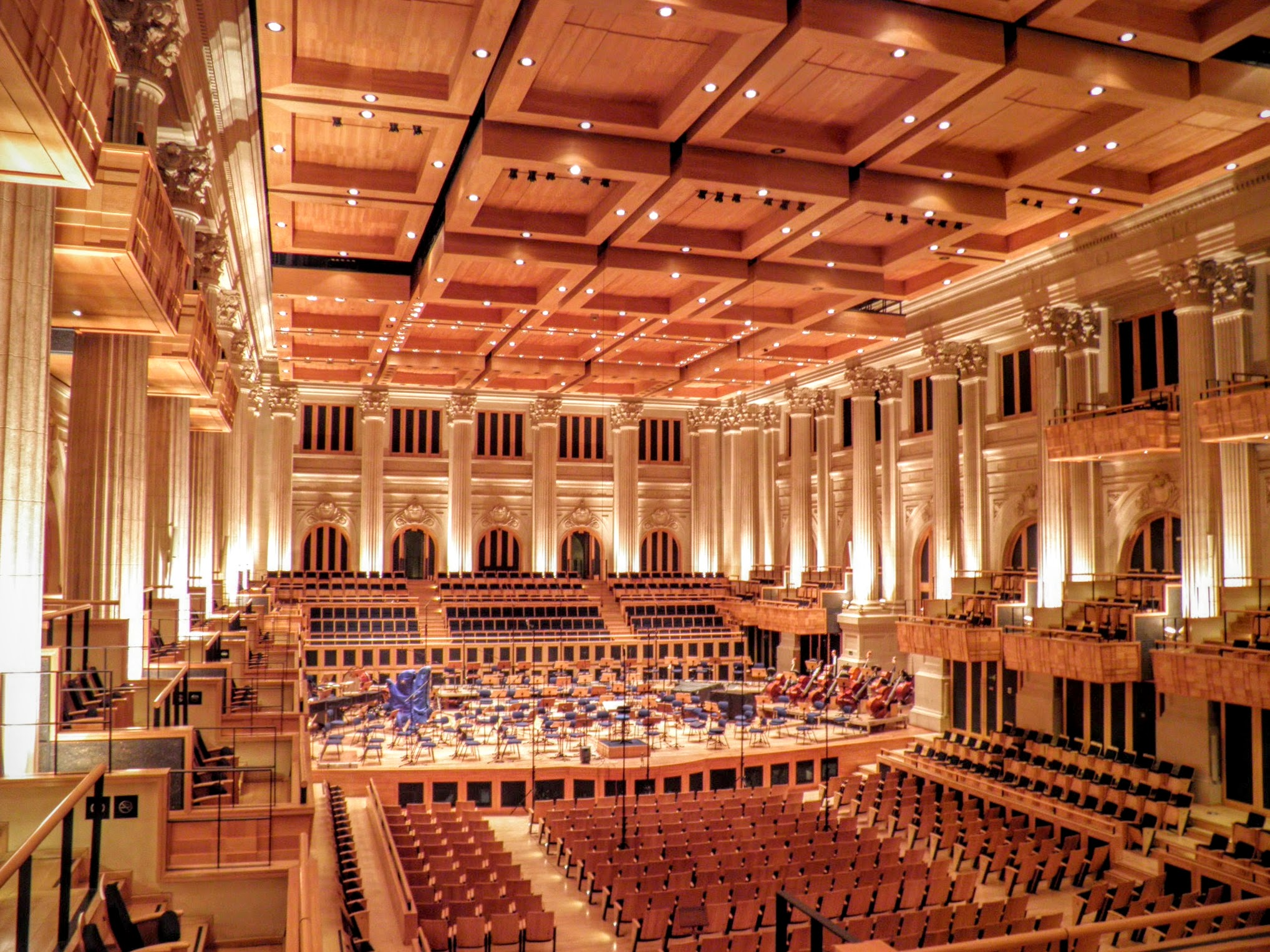
Sala São Paulo, the home of the São Paulo State Symphony

São Paulo and Rio de Janeiro are considered the centre of the urban music movement in Brazil.

Adoniran Barbosa was a samba singer and composer who became successful during São Paulo's early radio era. Born in 1912 in the town of Valinhos, Barbosa was known as the "composer to the masses", particularly Italian immigrants living in the quarters of Bela Vista, also known as "Bexiga" and Brás, as well as those who lived in the city's many 'cortiços' or tenements. His songs drew from the life of urban workers, the unemployed and those who lived on the edge. His first big hit was "Saudosa Maloca" ("Shanty of Fond Memories" – 1951), wherein three homeless friends recall with nostalgia their improvised shanty home, which was torn down by the landowner to make room for a building. His 1964 Trem das Onze ("The 11 pm Train"), became one of the five best samba songs ever, the protagonist explains to his lover that he cannot stay any longer because he has to catch the last train to the Jaçanã suburb, for his mother will not sleep before he arrives home. Another important musician with a similar style is Paulo Vanzolini. Vanzolini is a PhD in biology and a part-time professional musician. He composed a song depicting a love murder scene in São Paulo called "Ronda".

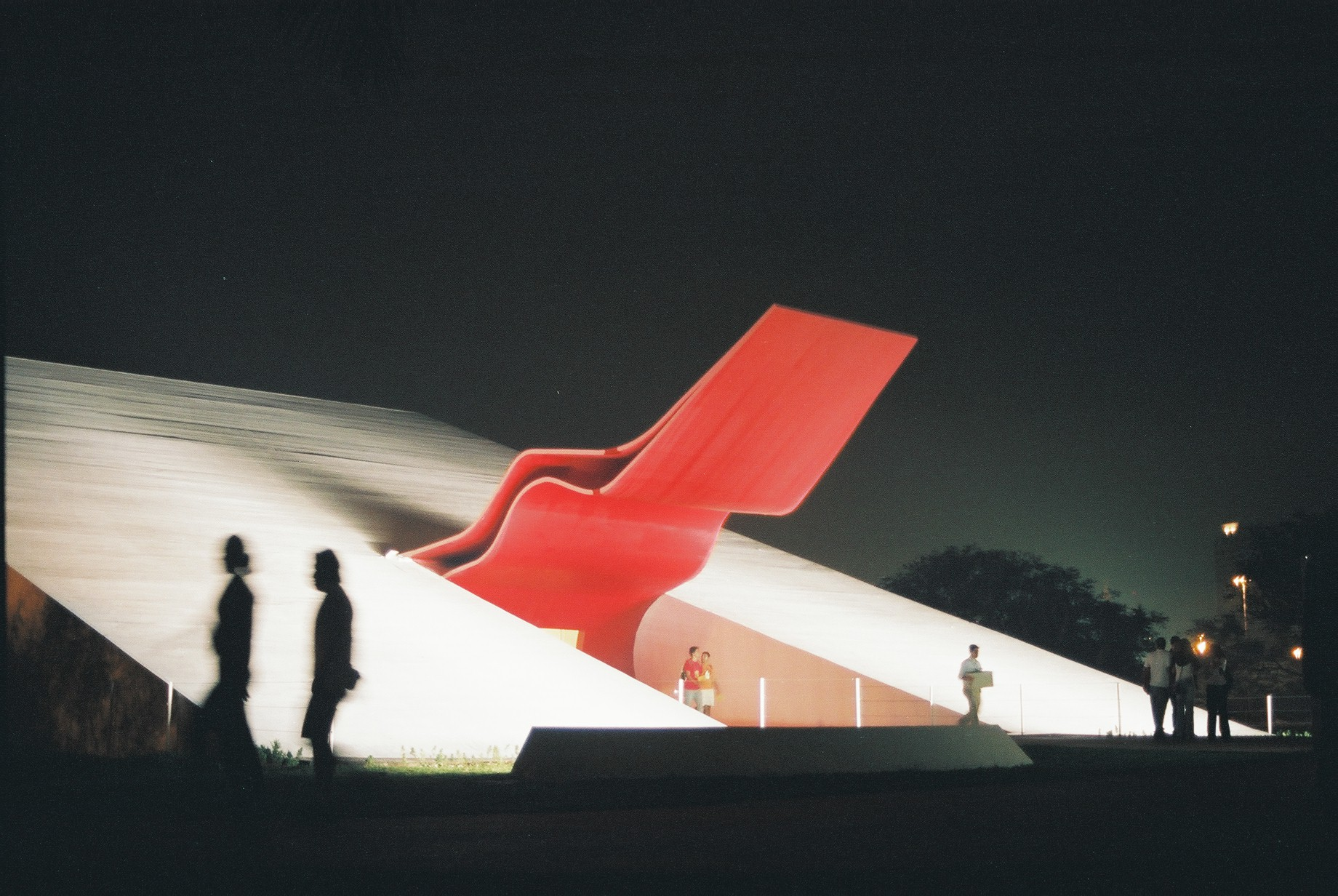
Ibirapuera Auditorium

In the late 1960s, a psychedelic rock band called Os Mutantes became popular. Their success is related to that of other tropicalia musicians. The group was known as very paulistanos in its behavior and clothing. Os Mutantes released five albums before lead singer Rita Lee departed in 1972 to join another group called Tutti Frutti. Although initially known only in Brazil, Os Mutantes became successful abroad after the 1990s. In 2000, Tecnicolor, an album recorded in the early 1970s in English by the band, was released with artwork designed by Sean Lennon.

In the early 1980s, a band called RPM was very successful in the 1980s, being considered The Beatles of Brazil. Their live album Rádio Pirata ao vivo was the best-selling Brazilian record ever, with more than 3 million copies sold. The group's success was not limited to CD sales. RPM started a phenomenon that was compared to Beatlemania, with enthusiastic fans filling stadiums, stopping traffic, evading security, and buying any products with the RPM brand.

A late punk and garage scene became strong in the 1980s in São Paulo, perhaps associated with the gloomy scenario of unemployment during an extended recession. Bands originating from this movement include Ultraje a Rigor, Ira!, Titãs, Ratos de Porão and Inocentes. In the 1990s, drum and bass arose as another musical movement in São Paulo, with artists such as DJ Marky, DJ Patife, XRS, Drumagick and Fernanda Porto. Many heavy metal bands also originated in São Paulo, such as Angra, Project46, Torture Squad, Korzus and Dr. Sin. Famous electro-pop band Cansei de Ser Sexy, or CSS (Portuguese for "tired of being sexy") also has its origins in the city.

Many of the most important classical Brazilian living composers, such as Amaral Vieira, Osvaldo Lacerda and Edson Zampronha, were born and live in São Paulo. Local baritone Paulo Szot has won international acclaim performing for six consecutive seasons at The Metropolitan Opera, La Scala and Opera de Paris, among others; and The Tony Award for best actor in a musical for his performance in a 2008 revival of South Pacific. The São Paulo State Symphony is one of the world's outstanding orchestras; their artistic director beginning in 2012 is the noted American conductor Marin Alsop. In 1952, Heitor Villa-Lobos wrote his Symphony Number 10 ('Ameríndia') for the 400th anniversary of São Paulo: an allegorical, historical and religious account of the city told through the eyes of its founder José de Anchieta.

São Paulo's opera houses are: São Paulo Municipal Theater, Theatro São Pedro and Alfa Theater, for the symphonic concerts there is the Sala São Paulo, the latter being the headquarters of OSESP, an orchestra. The city hosts several music halls. The main ones are: Citibank Hall, HSBC Music Hall, Olympia, Via Funchal, Villa Country, Arena Anhembi and Espaco das Américas. The Anhembi Sambadrome hosts musical presentations as well, in addition to the Carnival of São Paulo. Other facilities include the new Praça das Artes, with the Municipal Conservatory of Music Chamber Hall and others venues, like, Cultura Artistica, Teatro Sérgio Cardoso with a venue for only dance performances and Herzog & DeMeron's Centro Cultural Luz, for Ballet, Opera, theater and concerts, with three huge halls. The auditorium of the Latin-American Cultural Center, The Mozarteum, holds concerts through the year. Festivals as the Virada Cultural (Cultural Overnight) happen once a year and holds hundreds of attractions spread throughout the city.

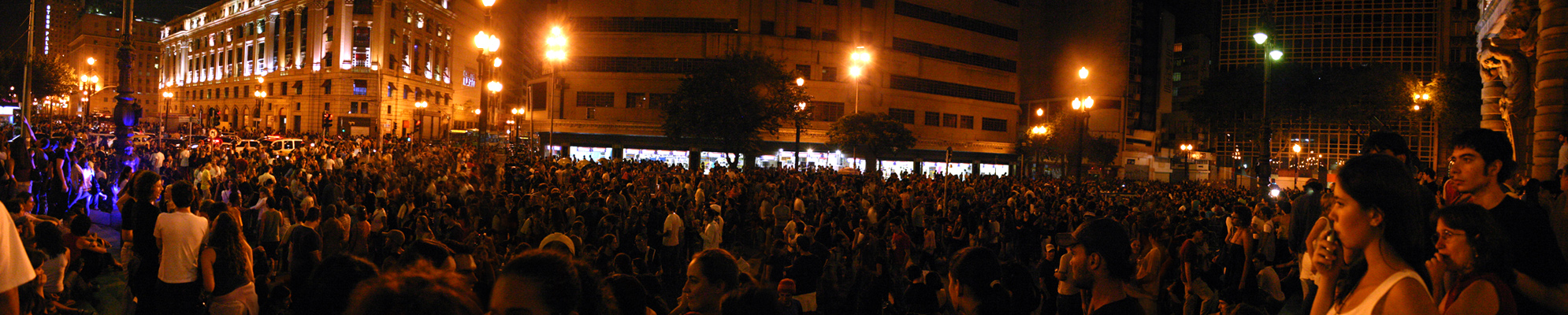
2007 Virada Cultural, in Downtown São Paulo

=== Literature ===
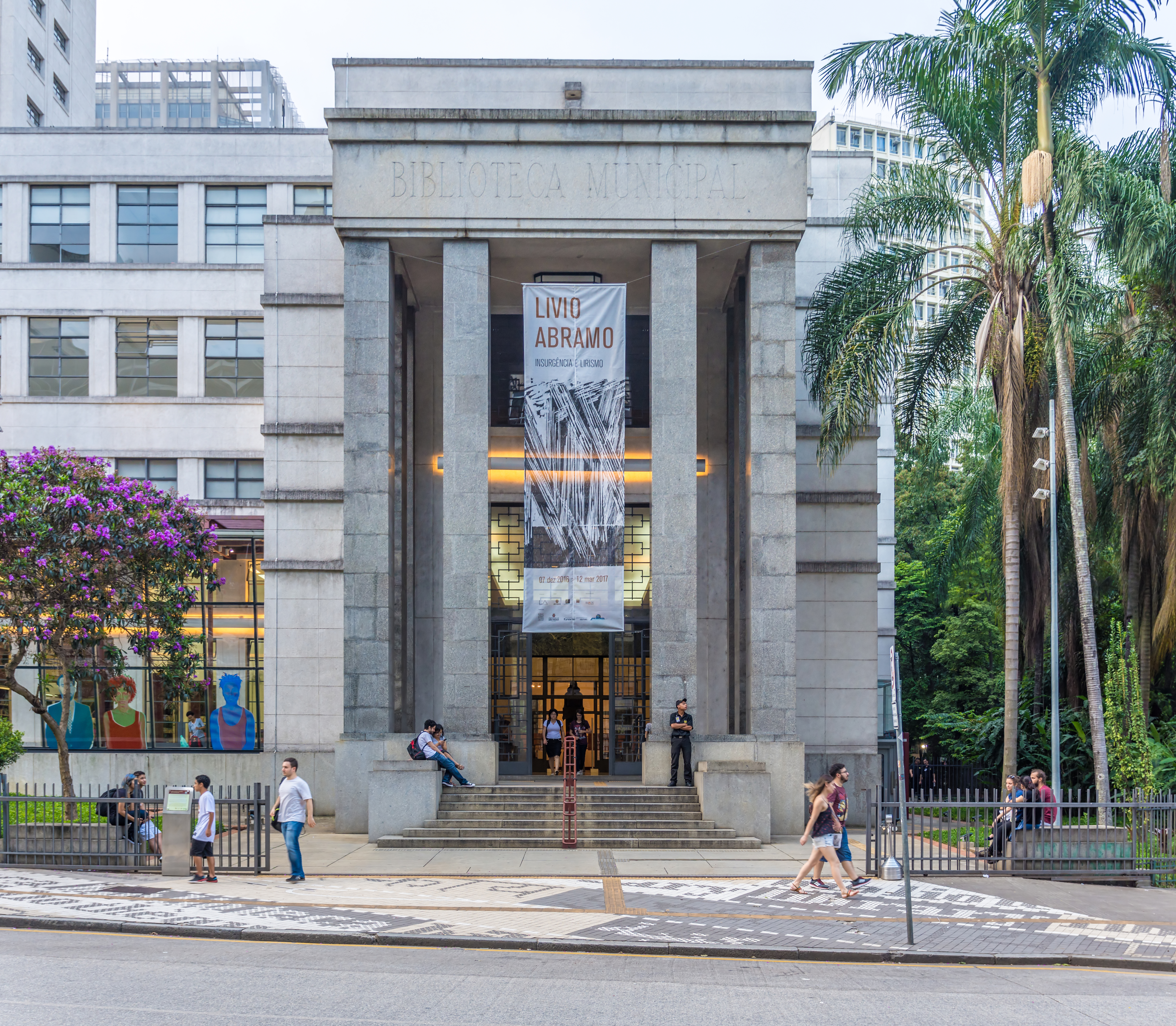
Mário de Andrade Library

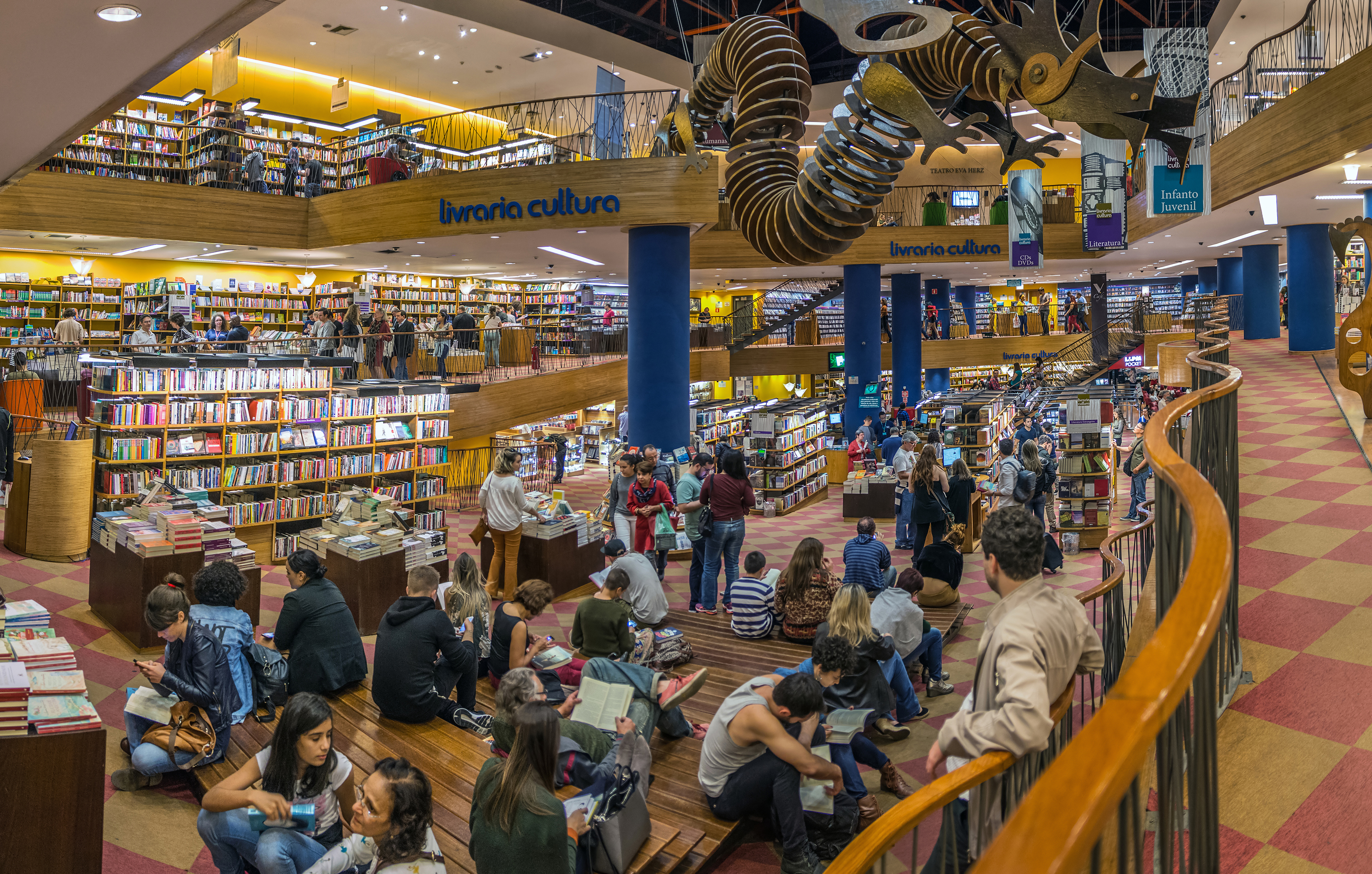
Livraria Cultura

São Paulo was home to the first Jesuit missionaries in Brazil, in the early 16th century. They wrote reports to the Portuguese crown about the newly found land, the native peoples and composed poetry and music for the catechism, creating the first written works from the area. The literary priests included Manuel da Nóbrega and José de Anchieta, living in or near the colony then called Piratininga. They also helped to register the Old Tupi language, lexicon and its grammar. In 1922, the Brazilian Modernist Movement, launched in São Paulo, began to achieve cultural independence. Brazil had gone through the same stages of development as the rest of Latin America, but its political and cultural independence came more gradually.

Brazilian elite culture was originally strongly tied to Portugal. Gradually writers developed a multi-ethnic body of work that was distinctively Brazilian. The presence of large numbers of former slaves added a distinctive African character to the culture. Subsequent infusions of immigrants of non-Portuguese origin broadened the range of influences.

Mário de Andrade and Oswald de Andrade were the prototypical modernists. With the urban poems of "Paulicéia Desvairada" and "Carefree Paulistan land" (1922), Mário de Andrade established the movement in Brazil. His rhapsodic novel Macunaíma (1928), with its abundance of Brazilian folklore, represents the apex of modernism's nationalist prose through its creation of an offbeat native national hero. Oswald de Andrade's experimental poetry, avant-garde prose, particularly the novel Serafim Ponte Grande (1933) and provocative manifestos exemplify the movement's break with tradition.

Modernist artists and writers chose the Municipal Theatre of São Paulo to launch their Modernist manifesto. The site happened to be a bastion of European culture with opera and classical music presentations from Germany, France, Austria and Italy. They defied the high society that frequented the venue and who insisted on speaking only foreign languages such as French, behaving as if Brazilian culture did not matter.

=== Theaters ===
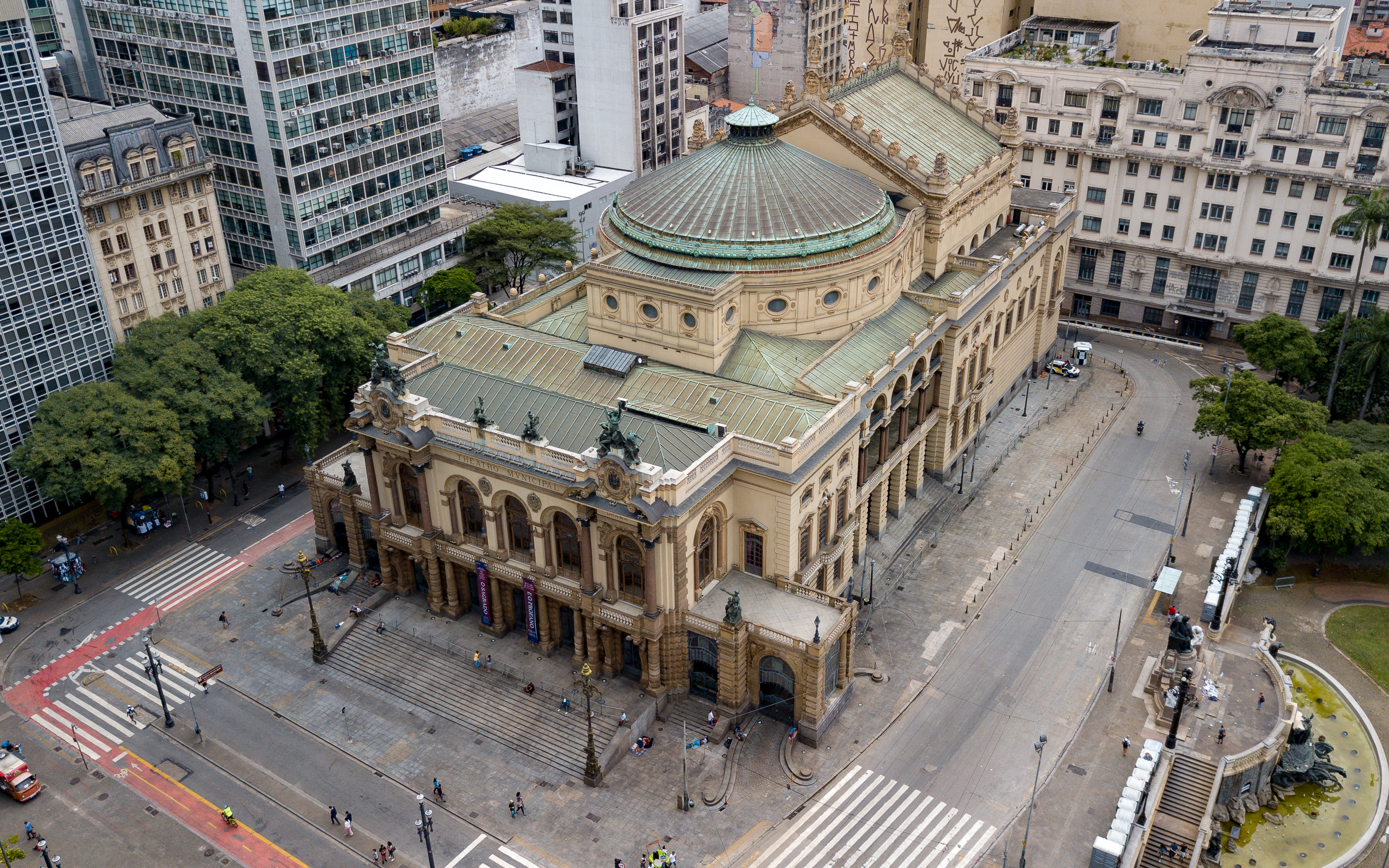
Municipal Theatre of São Paulo

Many historians believe that the first theatrical performance in Brazil was held in São Paulo. The Portuguese Jesuit missionary José de Anchieta (1534–1597) wrote short plays that were performed and watched by the Tupi–Guarani natives. In the second half of the 19th century, a cultural, musical and theatrical life emerged. European ethnic groups began holding performances in some of the state's rural cities. The most important period for the art in São Paulo was the 1940s. São Paulo had had a professional company, Teatro Brasileiro de Comédia, (Brazilian Theater of Comedy), along with others.

During the 1960s, major theater productions in São Paulo and Brazil were presented by two groups. Teatro de Arena began with a group of students from Escola de Arte Dramática (Drama Art School), founded by Alfredo Mesquita, in 1948. In 1958, the group excelled with the play "Eles não usam black tie" by Gianfrancesco Guarnieri which was the first in the history of the Brazilian drama to feature labor workers as protagonists.

After the military coup of 1964, plays started focusing on Brazilian history (Zumbi, Tiradentes). Teatro de Arena and Teatro Oficina supported the democratic resistance during the military dictatorship period, marked by its censorship. The Tropicalist movement began there. A number of plays represented historic moments, notably "O Rei da Vela", "Galileu Galilei" (1968), "Na Selva das Cidades" (1969) and "Gracias Señor" (1972).

The district of Bixiga concentrates the greatest number of theaters, around 40 including the theaters that are closed for refurbishing or for other reasons, and small alternatives companies venues. Some of the most important are Renault, Brigadeiro, Zaccaro, Bibi Ferreira, Maria della Costa, Ruth Escobar, Opera, TBC, Imprensa, Oficina, Àgora, Cacilda Becker, Sérgio Cardoso, do Bixiga, and Bandeirantes.

=== Museums ===
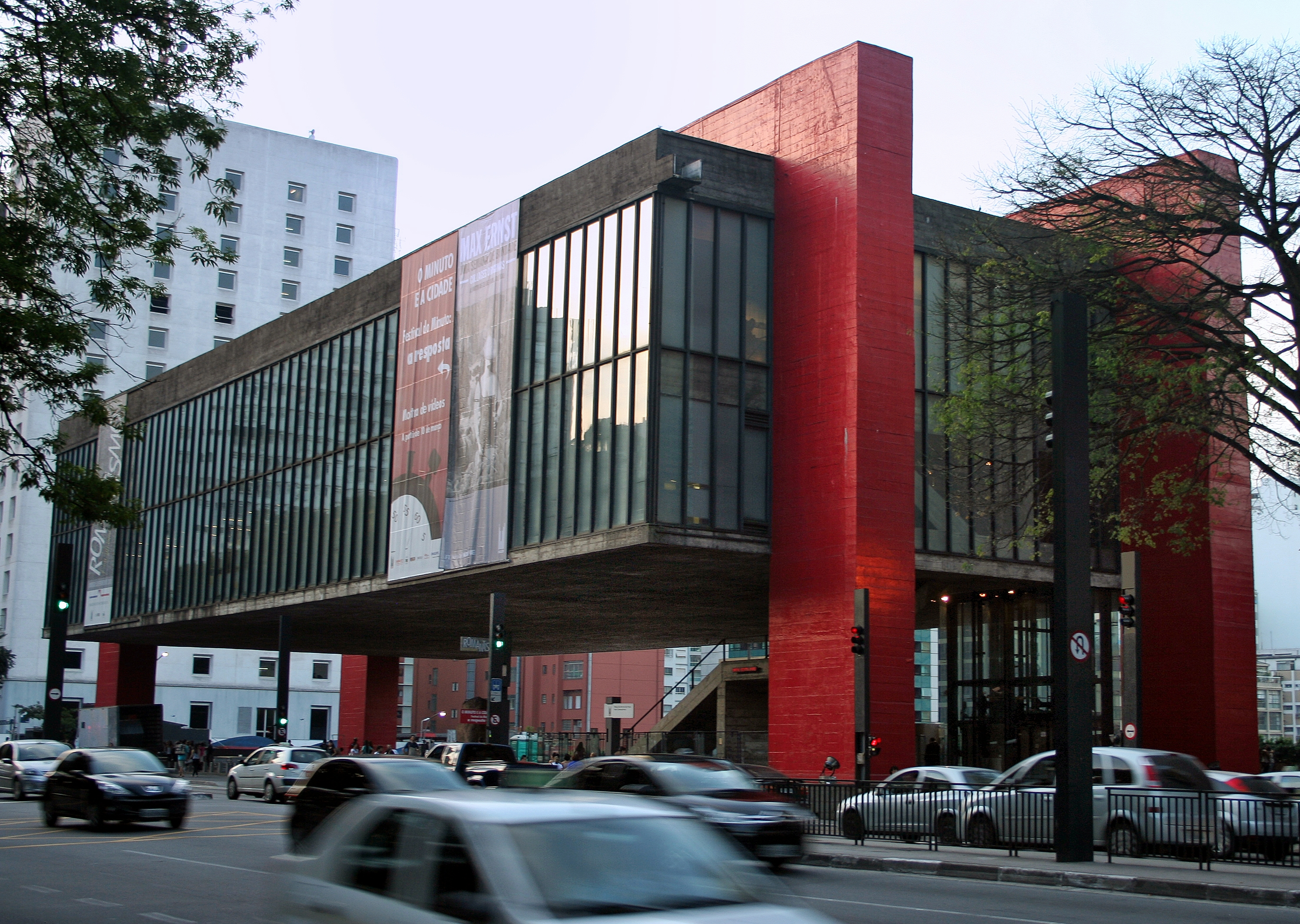
São Paulo Museum of Art

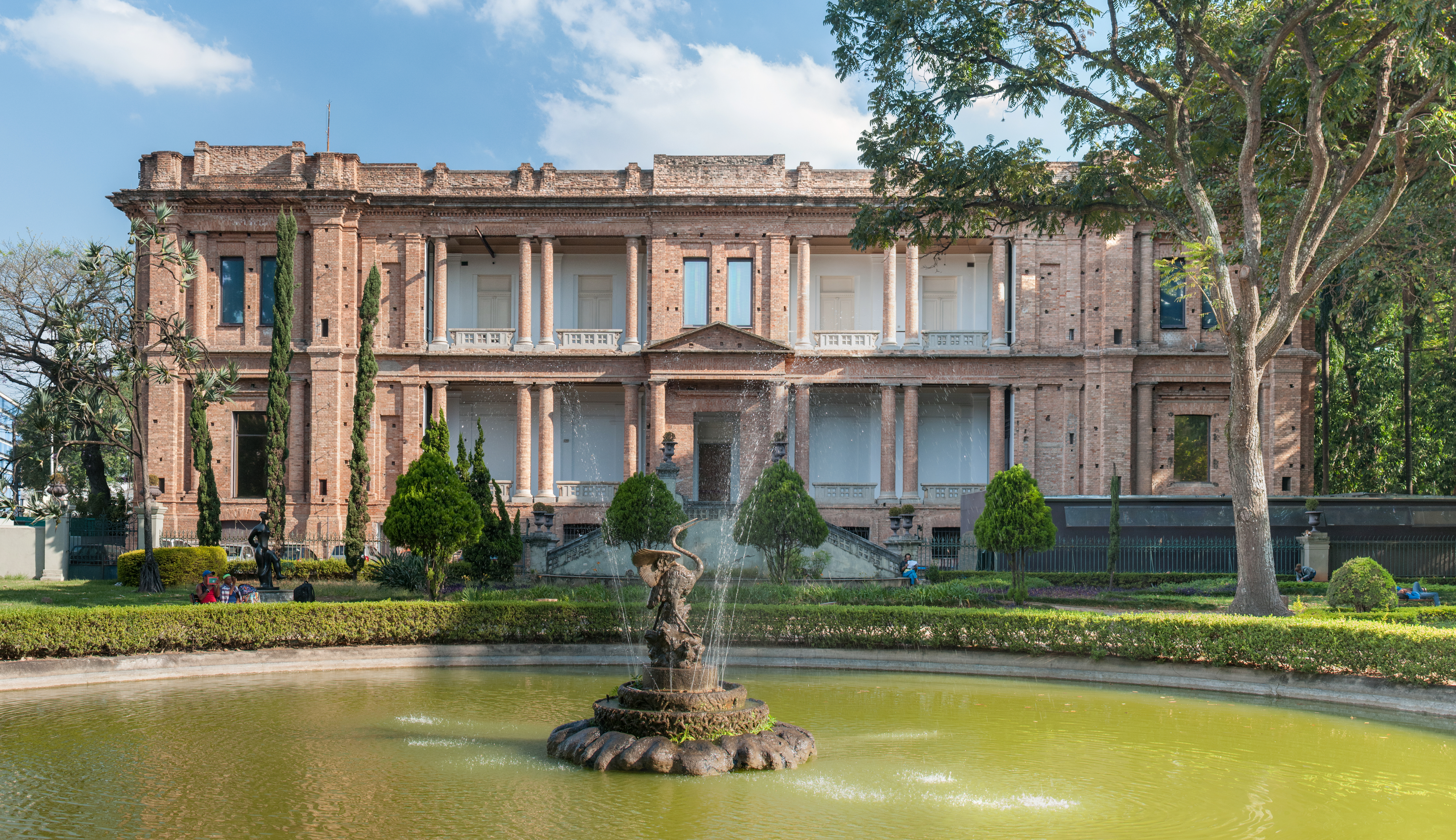
Pinacotheca of the State of São Paulo

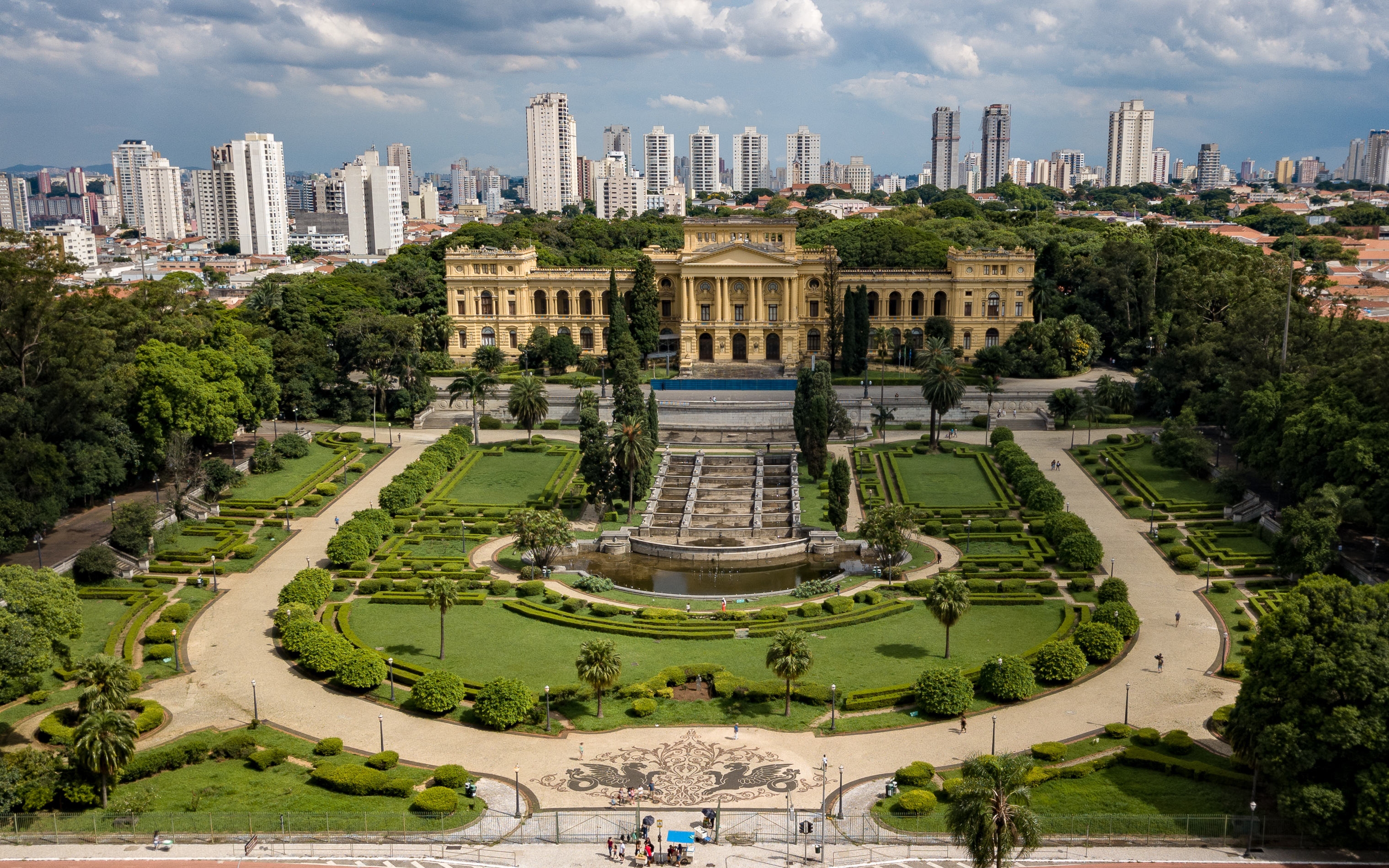
Ipiranga Museum

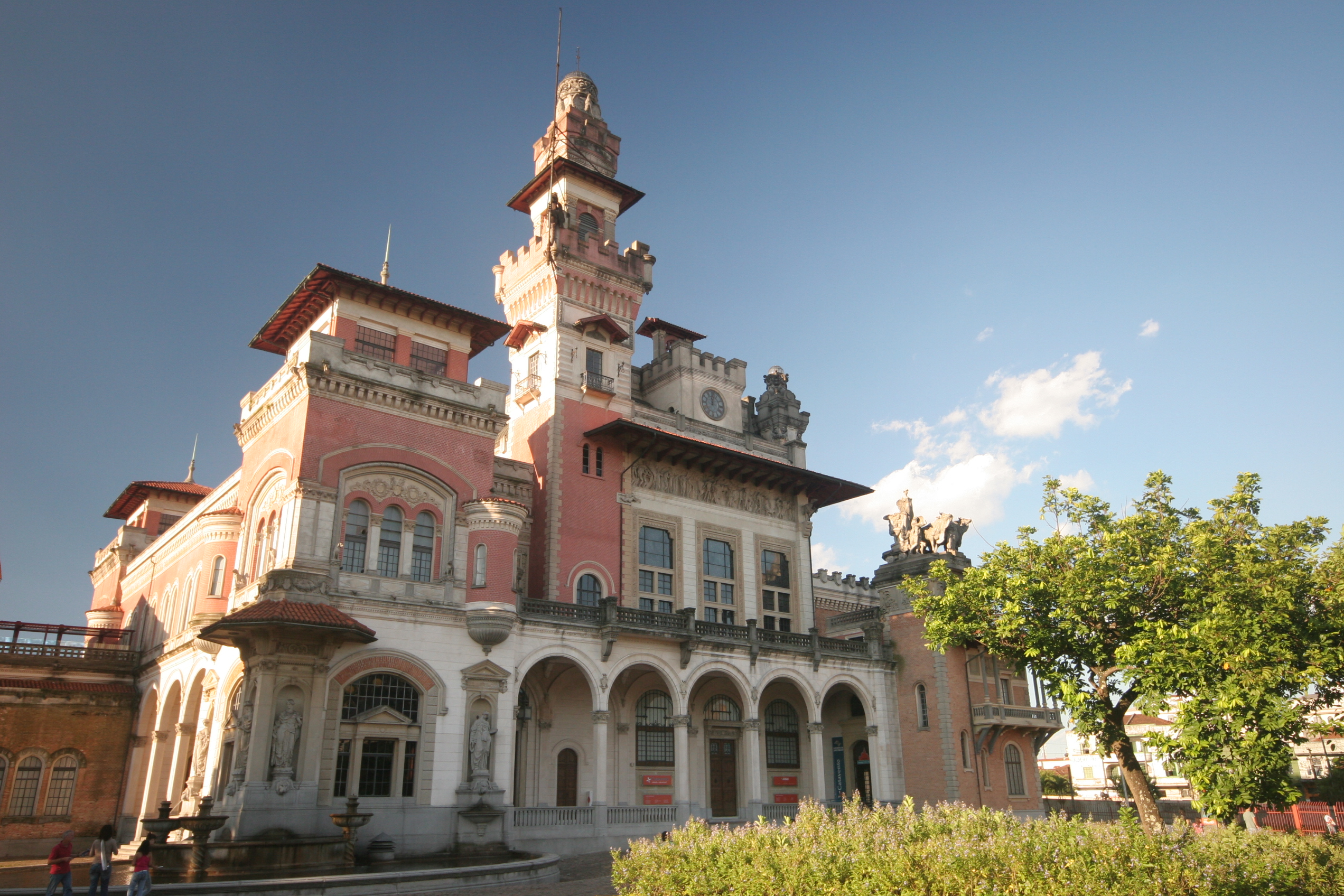
Catavento Museum

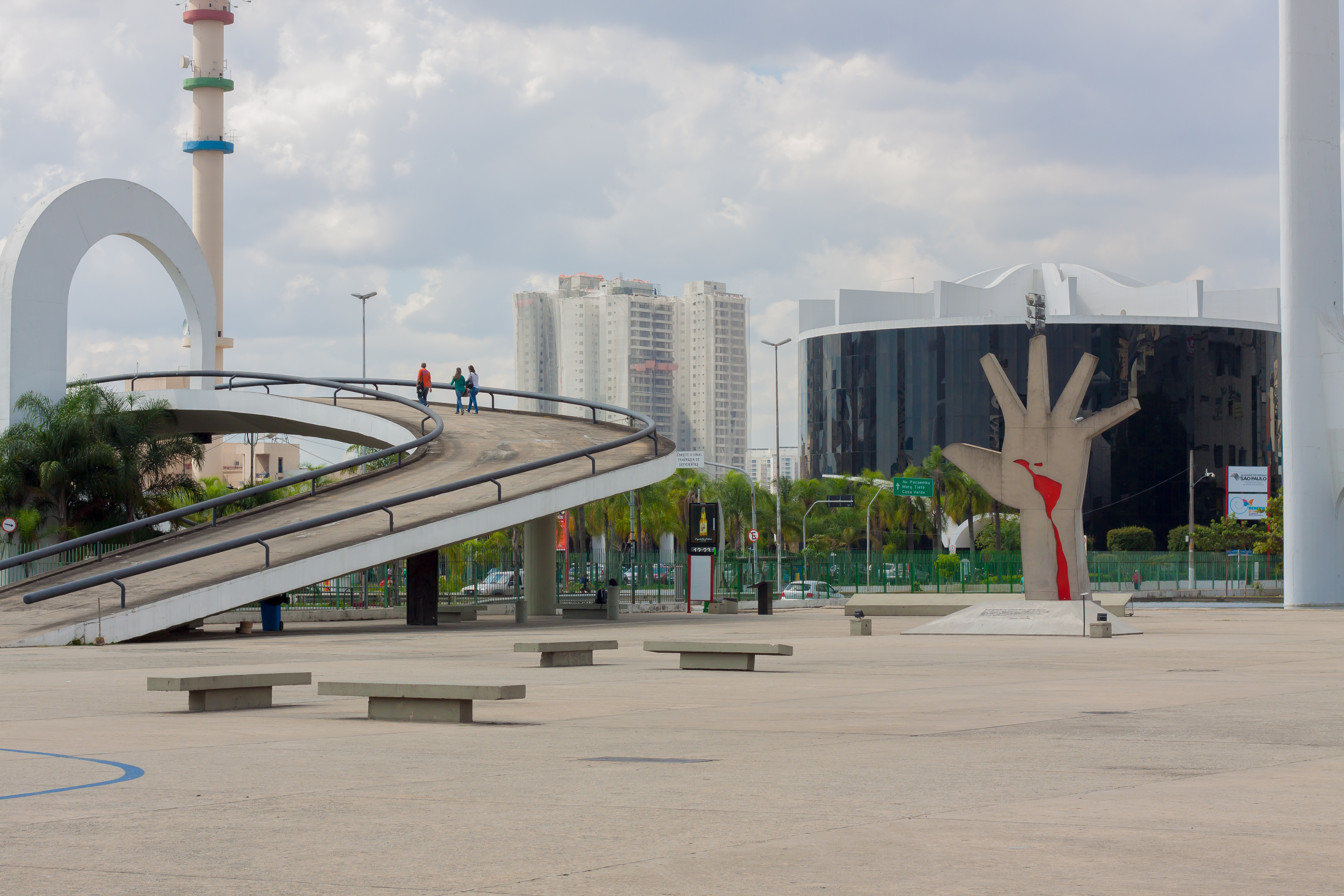
Latin America Memorial

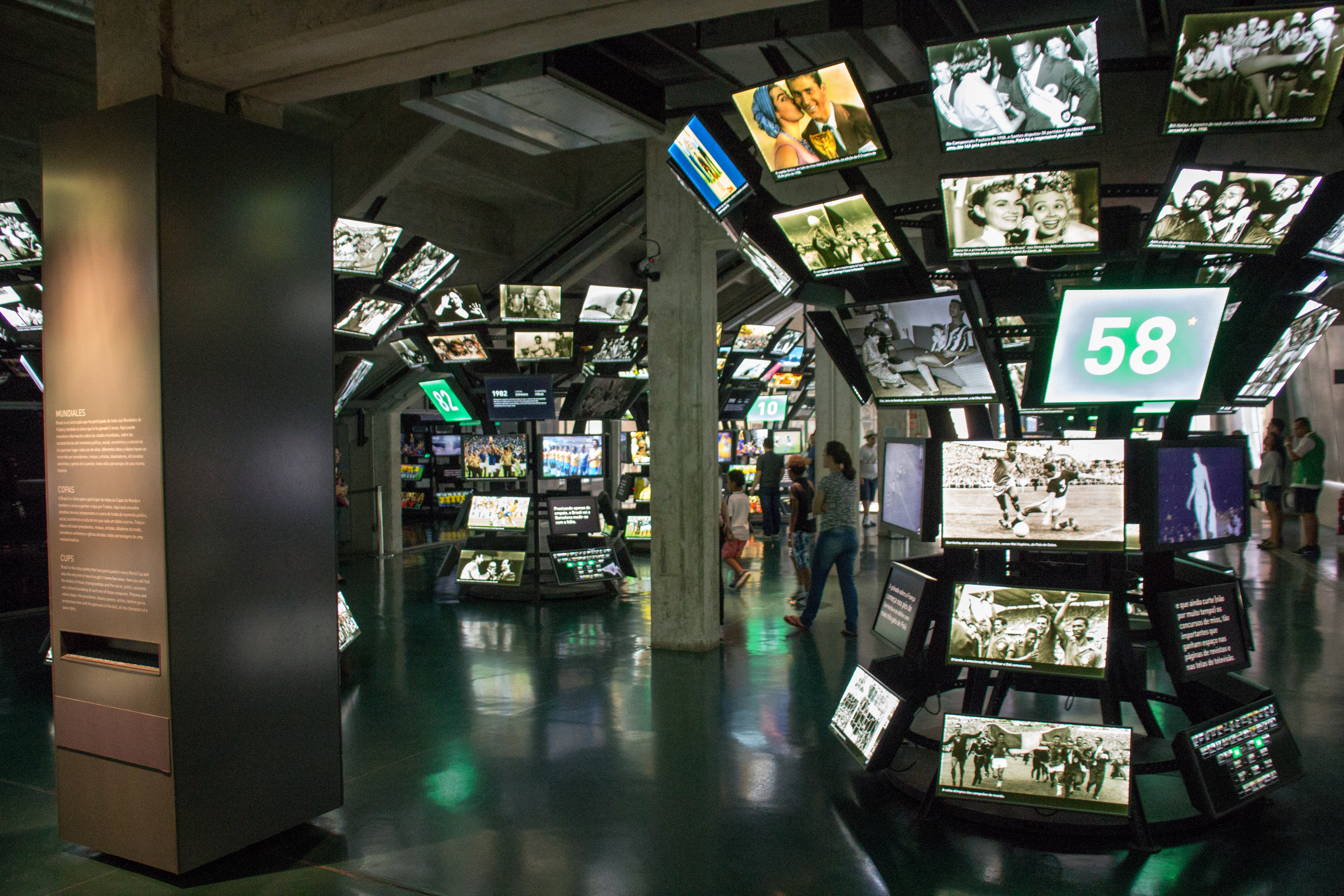
Football Museum at Pacaembu Stadium

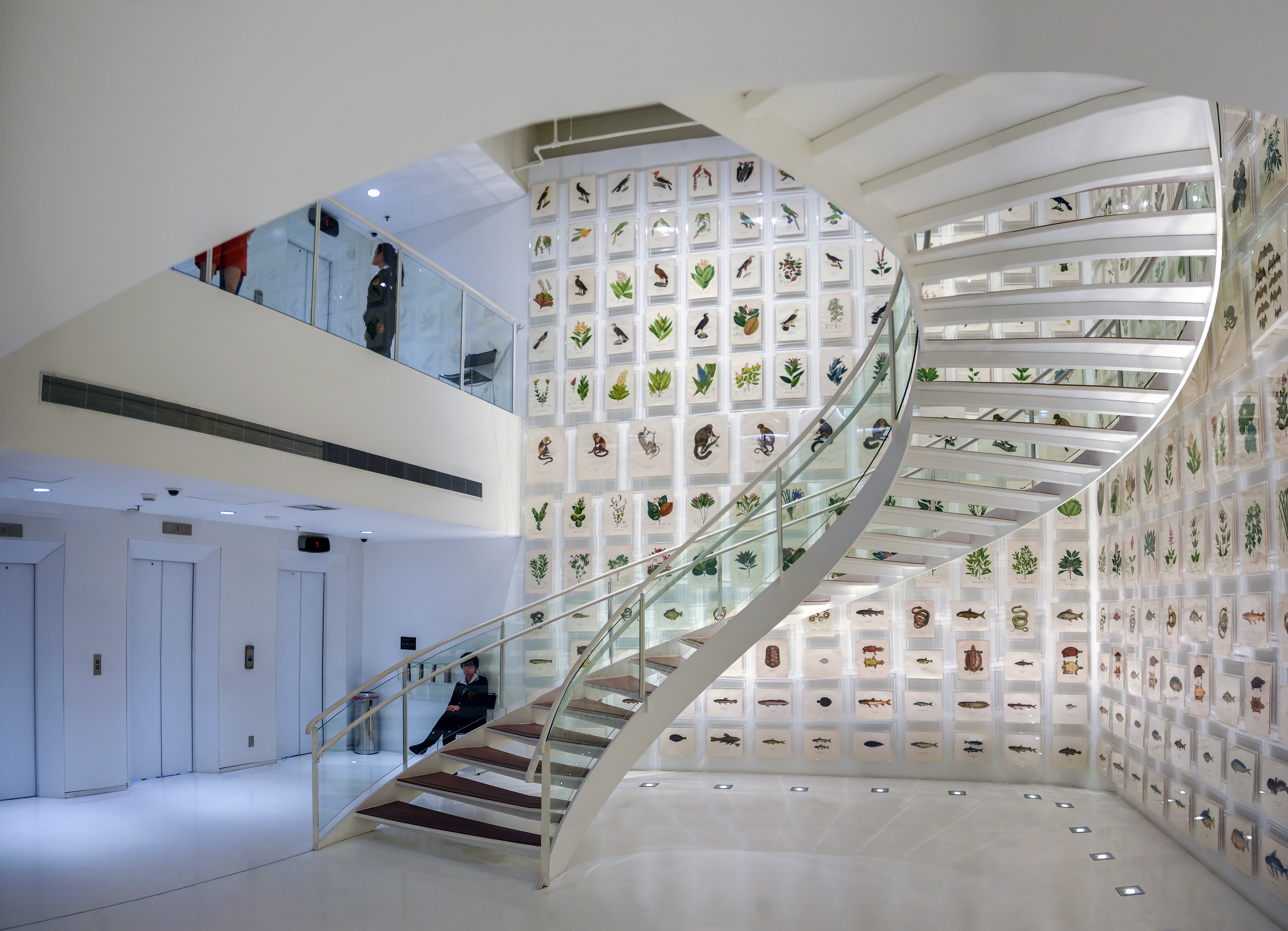
Itaú Cultural

São Paulo has many neighborhoods and buildings of historical value. The city has a large number of museums and art galleries. Among the museums in the city are São Paulo Museum of Art (MASP), the Ipiranga Museum, the Museum of Sacred Art, the Museum of the Portuguese Language, the Pinacoteca do Estado de São Paulo, among other renowned institutions. It also houses one of the top five zoos in the world, the São Paulo Zoo.

The Ipiranga Museum was the first monument built to preserve the memory of the Independence of Brazil. It opened on September 7, 1895 as the Natural Science Museum. In 1919, it became a history museum. Reflecting the architectural influence of the Versailles Palace in France, the Ipiranga's collection, with approximately 100,000 pieces, comprises works of art, furniture, clothing and appliances that belonged to those who took part in Brazilian history, such as explorers, rulers and freedom fighters. Its facilities house a library with 100,000 books and the "Centro de Documentação Histórica", Historic Documentation Center, with 40,000 manuscripts.

The Ema Gordon Klabin Cultural Foundation opened to the public in March 2007. Its headquarters is a 1920s mansion. It houses 1545 works, including paintings by Marc Chagall, Pompeo Batoni, Pierre Gobert and Frans Post, Brazilian modernists Tarsila do Amaral, Di Cavalcanti and Portinari, period furniture, decorative and archeological pieces.

Stretching over 78 thousand square meters (0.84 million square feet), Memorial da América Latina (Latin America's Memorial) was conceived to showcase Latin American countries and their roots and cultures. It is home to the headquarters of Parlamento Latino-Americano – Parlatino (Latin American Parliament). Designed by Oscar Niemeyer, Memorial has an exhibition pavilion with permanent exhibition of the continent's craftwork production; a library with books, newspapers, magazines, videos, films and records about the history of Latin America; and a 1,679-seat auditorium.

Hospedaria do Imigrante (Immigrant's Hostel) was built in 1886 and opened in 1887. Immigrant's Hostel was built in Brás to welcome the immigrants who arrived in Brazil through the Port of Santos, quarantining those who were sick and helping new arrivals to find work in coffee plantations in Western, Northern and Southwestern São Paulo State and Northern Paraná State. From 1882 to 1978, 2.5 million immigrants of more than 60 nationalities and ethnicities were guests there, all of them duly registered in the museum's books and lists. The hostel hosted approximately 3,000 people on average, but occasionally reached 8,000. The hostel received the last immigrants in 1978. In 1998 the hostel became a museum, where it preserves the immigrants' documentation, memory and objects. Located in one of the few remaining centenarian buildings, the museum occupies part of the former hostel. The museum also restores wooden train wagons from the former São Paulo Railway. Two restored wagons inhabit the museum. One dates from 1914, while a second class passenger car dates from 1931. The museum records the names of all immigrants who were hosted there from 1888 to 1978.

MASP has one of world's most important collections of European art. The most important collections cover Italian and French painting schools. The museum was founded by Assis Chateaubriand and is directed by Pietro Maria Bardi. Its headquarters, opened in 1968, were designed by Lina Bo Bardi. MASP organizes temporary exhibitions in special areas. Brazilian and international exhibitions of contemporary arts, photography, design and architecture take turn during the whole year.

Located next to the Luz metro station, the Pinacoteca do Estado de São Paulo was projected by architect Ramos de Azevedo in 1895. It was constructed to house an Arts Lyceum. In 1911, it became a museum, where it hosts a number of art exhibitions, such as bronze statues of French sculptor Auguste Rodin took place in 2001. There is also a permanent exhibition on the "Resistance" movement that took place during military dictatorship in the Republican period, including a reconstructed prison cell where political prisoners were kept.

The Catavento Museum is an interactive museum, inaugurated in 2009. It is dedicated to science and its dissemination, and is located in the Palácio das Indústrias ("Palace of the Industries"). The 12,000 square meter space is divided into 4 sections: "Universo" ("Universe"),"Vida" ("Life"), "Engenho" ("Ingenuity") and "Sociedade" ("Society") and has more than 250 installations. Aimed at young audiences, it was founded by the state secretariats of culture and education, with an investment of 20 million reais after 14 months of construction.

The Museum of Art of the Parliament of São Paulo is a contemporary art museum housed in the Palácio 9 de Julho, the Legislative Assembly of São Paulo house. The museum is run by the Department of Artistic Heritage of the Legislative Assembly and has paintings, sculpture, prints, ceramics and photographs, exploring the Brazilian contemporary art.

=== Media ===
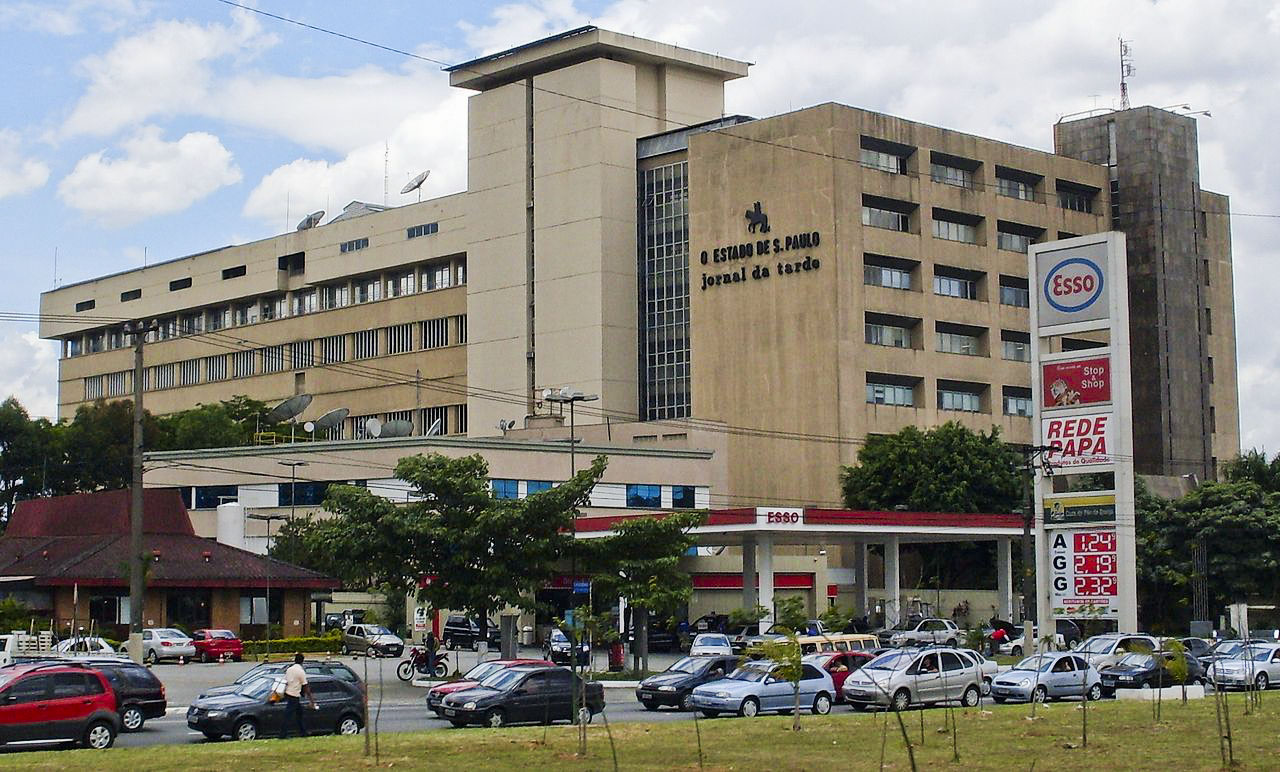
Headquarters of the newspaper O Estado de S. Paulo on the Marginal Tietê

São Paulo is home to the two most important daily newspapers in Brazil, Folha de S.Paulo and O Estado de S. Paulo. Also, the top three weekly news magazines of the country are based in the city, Veja, Época and ISTOÉ.

Two of the five major television networks are based in the city, Band and RecordTV, while SBT and RedeTV! are based in Osasco, a city in the São Paulo metropolitan area, while Globo, the country's most watched TV channel, has a major news bureau and entertainment production center in the city. In addition, Gazeta is at Paulista Avenue and the city is used for its station idents since 2014.

Many of the major AM and FM radio networks of Brazil are headquartered in São Paulo, such as Jovem Pan, Rádio Mix, Transamérica, BandNews FM, CBN, 89 A Radio Rock, Kiss FM and Band FM. The telephone area code for the city of São Paulo is 11.

=== Sports ===
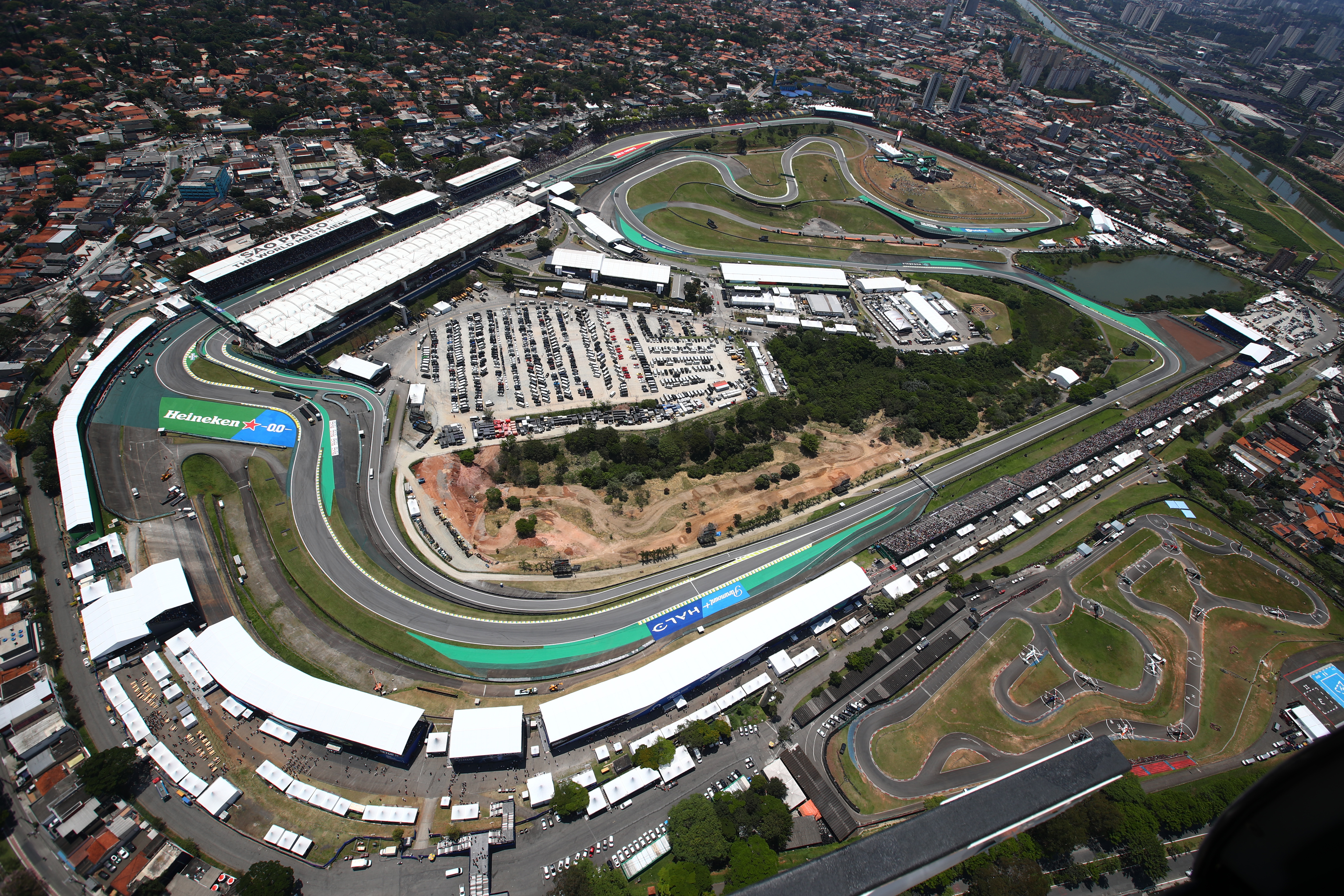
Formula One São Paulo Grand Prix is held at the Autódromo José Carlos Pace in Interlagos.

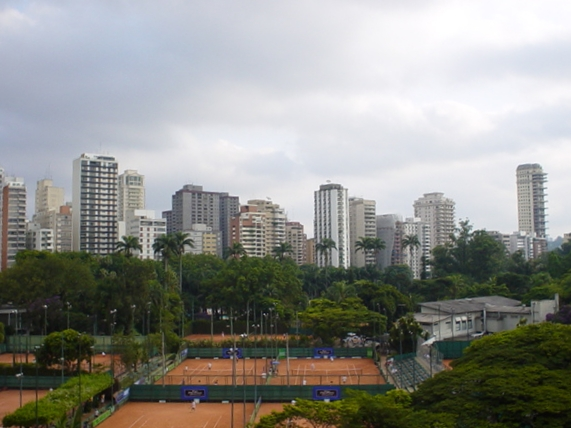
The Esporte Clube Pinheiros is an important multi-sports and social club.

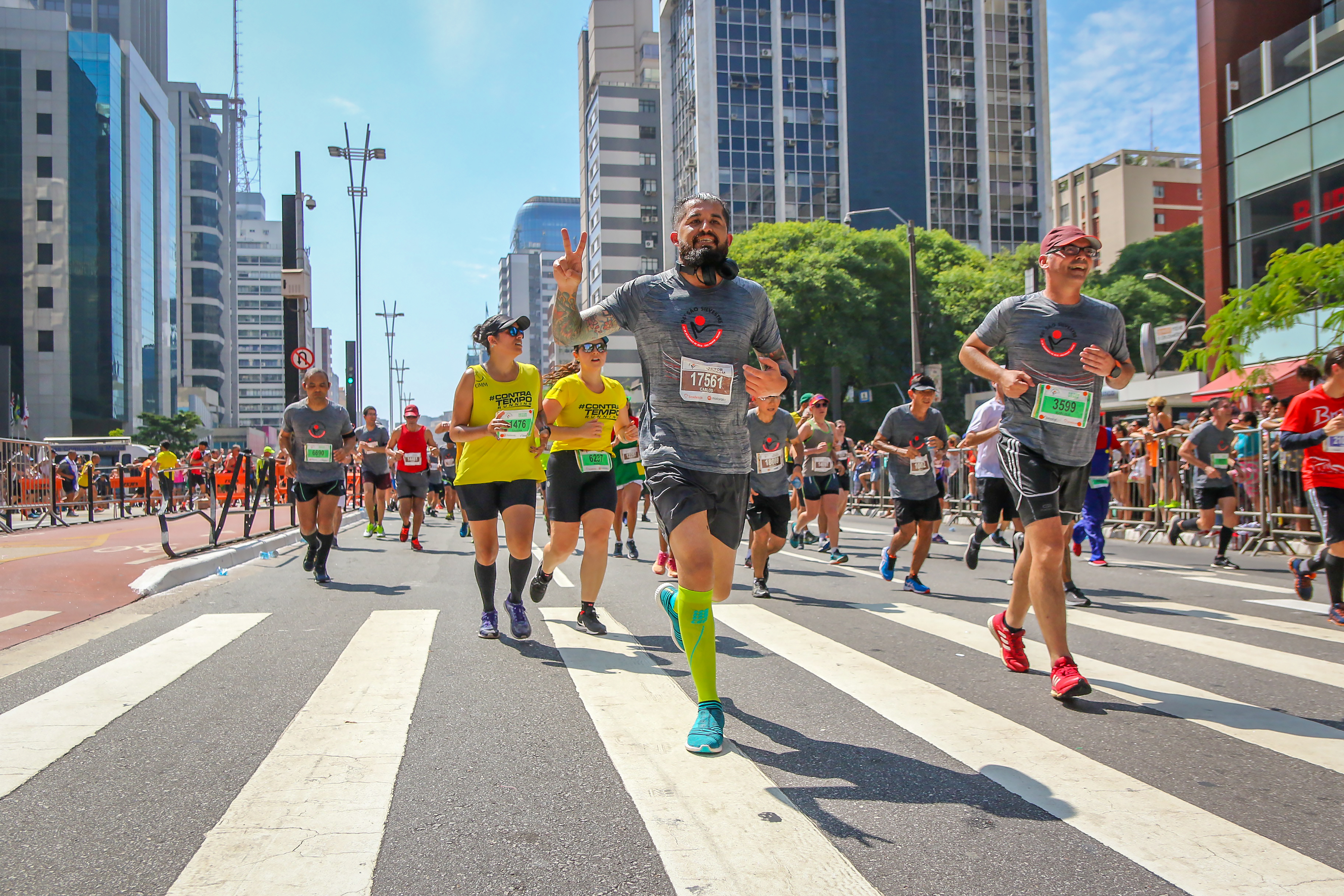
Saint Silvester Road Race in 2018

The city hosts sporting events of national and international importance, such as the São Paulo Grand Prix, held at the Interlagos Circuit. Among the main events that São Paulo hosted are the 1950 FIFA World Cup, the 1963 Pan American Games, the 2000 FIFA Club World Championship, the 2014 FIFA World Cup Opening Ceremony (and five more matches from the same tournament) and The city also has a Jockey Club, where the first race took place on 29 October 1876.

As in the rest of Brazil, football is the most popular sport. The city's major teams are Corinthians, Palmeiras and São Paulo. Portuguesa is a medium club and Juventus, Nacional and Barcelona EC are three small clubs.

Formula One is also one of the most popular sports in Brazil. Three-time Formula One world champion and São Paulo native Ayrton Senna is one of Brazil's most famous sportsmen. The Formula One São Paulo Grand Prix (formally known as the Brazilian Grand Prix) is held at the Autódromo José Carlos Pace in Interlagos, Socorro. The Grand Prix has been held at the Interlagos circuit from 1973 to 1977, in 1979 and 1980, and from 1990 to the present. Four Brazilian drivers have won the Brazilian Grand Prix, all of whom were born in São Paulo: Emerson Fittipaldi (1973 and 1974), José Carlos Pace (1975), Ayrton Senna (1991 and 1993) and Felipe Massa (2006 and 2008). In 2007, a new local railway station Autódromo of the Line C (Line 9) of CPTM, was constructed near the circuit to improve access.

Volleyball, basketball, skateboard and tennis are other major sports. There are several traditional sports clubs in São Paulo that are home for teams in many championships. The most important are Esporte Clube Pinheiros (waterpolo, women's volleyball, swimming, men's basketball and handball), Clube Athletico Paulistano (basketball), Esporte Clube Banespa (volleyball, handball and futsal), Esporte Clube Sírio (basketball), Associação Atlética Hebraica (basketball), Clube Atlético Monte Líbano (basketball), Clube de Campo Associação Atlética Guapira (amateur football) and Clube Atlético Ipiranga (multi-sports and former professional football).

The São Silvestre Race takes place every New Year's Eve. It was first held in 1925, when the competitors ran about 8,000 meters (26,000 feet). Since then, the distance raced varied, but is now set at 15 km (9.3 mi). The São Paulo Indy 300 was an IndyCar Series race in Santana that ran annually from 2010 to 2013. The event was removed from the 2014 season calendar. São Paulo hosted the official 1984 Tournament of the Americas (basketball) where the Brazilian national team won its first out of four gold medals.

In Bom Retiro district, there is a public baseball stadium, Estádio Mie Nishi, while Santo Amaro district is the seat of the Núcleo de Alto Rendimento (NAR) is a high performance sports center focused on Olympic athletes. São Paulo is also rugby union's stronghold in Brazil, with the main rugby field in the city being at the São Paulo Athletic Club, São Paulo's oldest club, founded by the British community. The Cobras Brasil Rugby, Brazilian professional franchise that plays the Super Rugby Americas, is based in São Paulo.

The city has five major stadiums: Morumbi Stadium, owned by São Paulo FC; Pacaembu Stadium, owned by the municipal administration; the Allianz Parque arena by S.E. Palmeiras; Canindé Stadium, owned by Portuguesa de Desportos and Arena Corinthians, owned by Sport Club Corinthians Paulista, located in Itaquera. It also has several volleyball and basketball gyms, tennis courts, and many other sports arenas, such as the Ginásio do Ibirapuera, intended mainly for athletics.

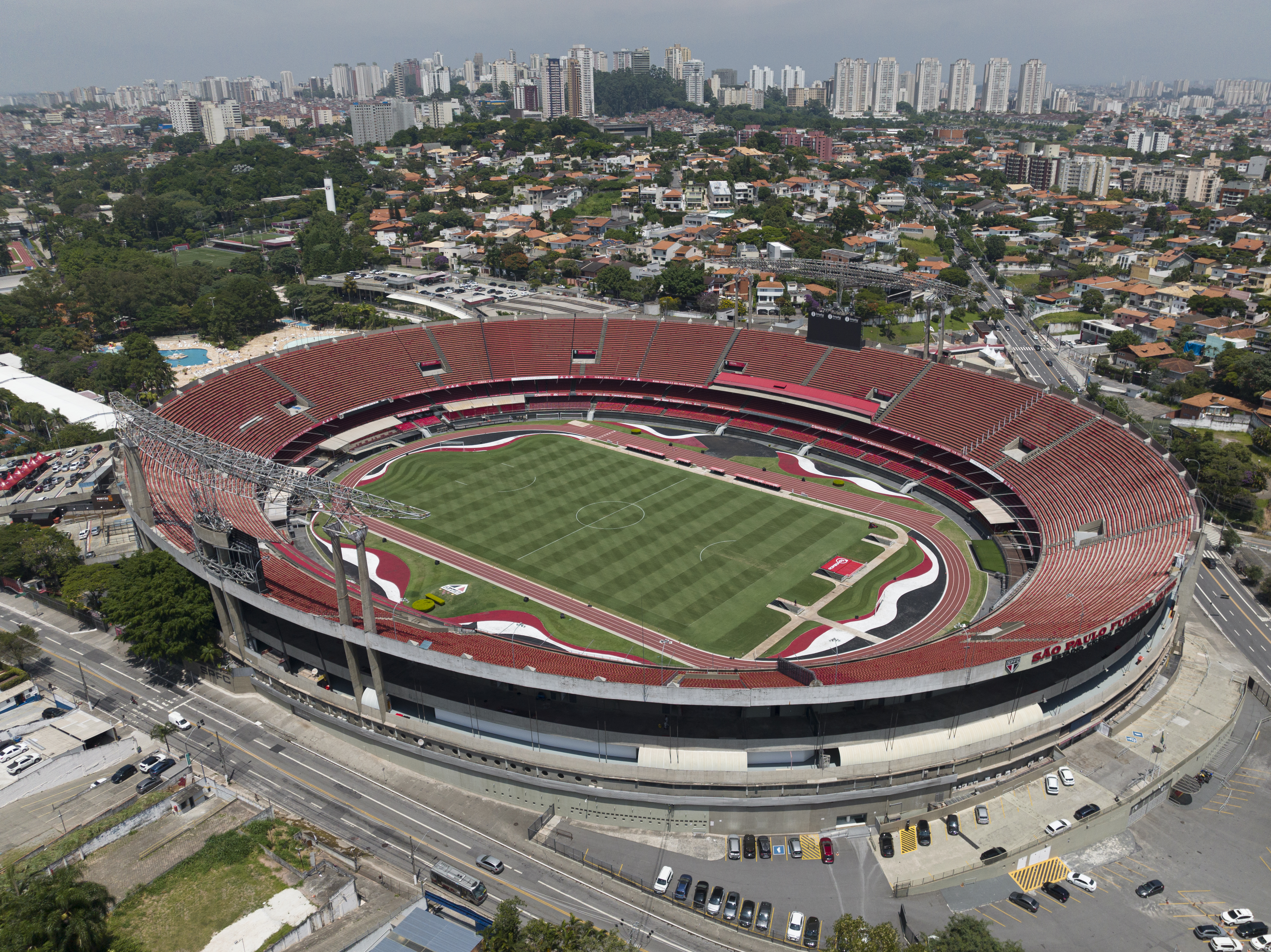
Morumbi Stadium

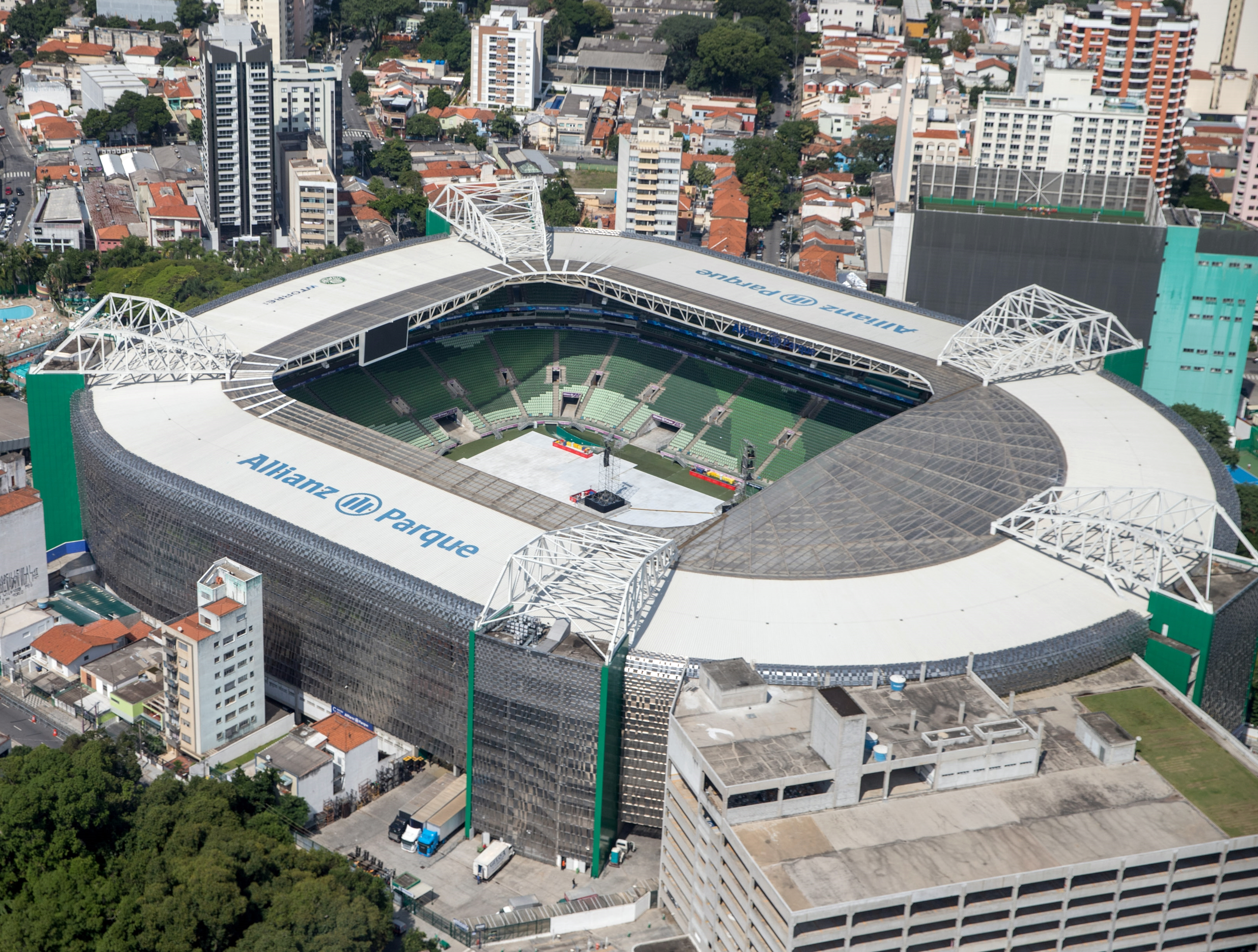
Allianz Parque

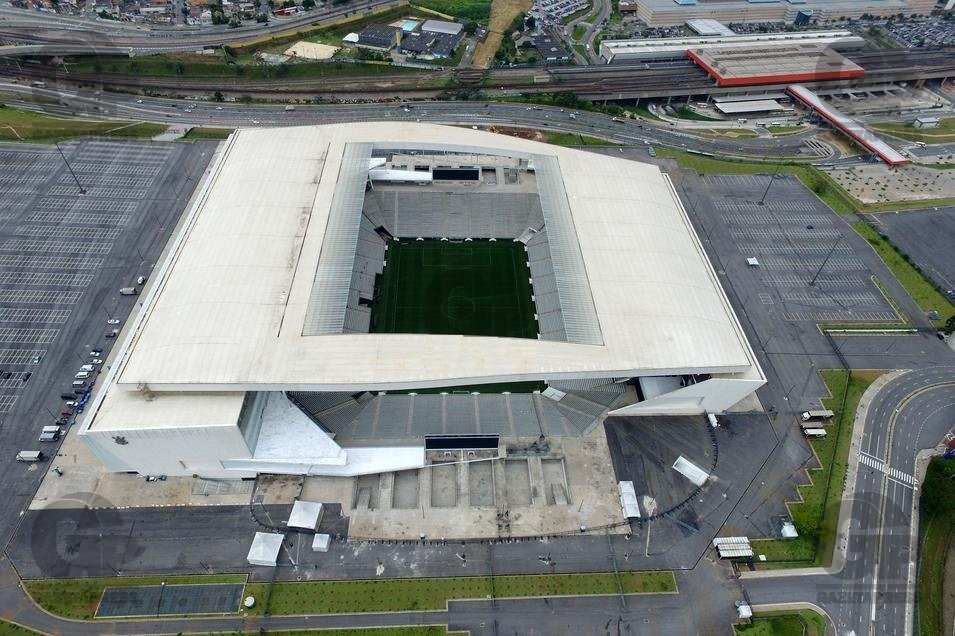
Arena Corinthians

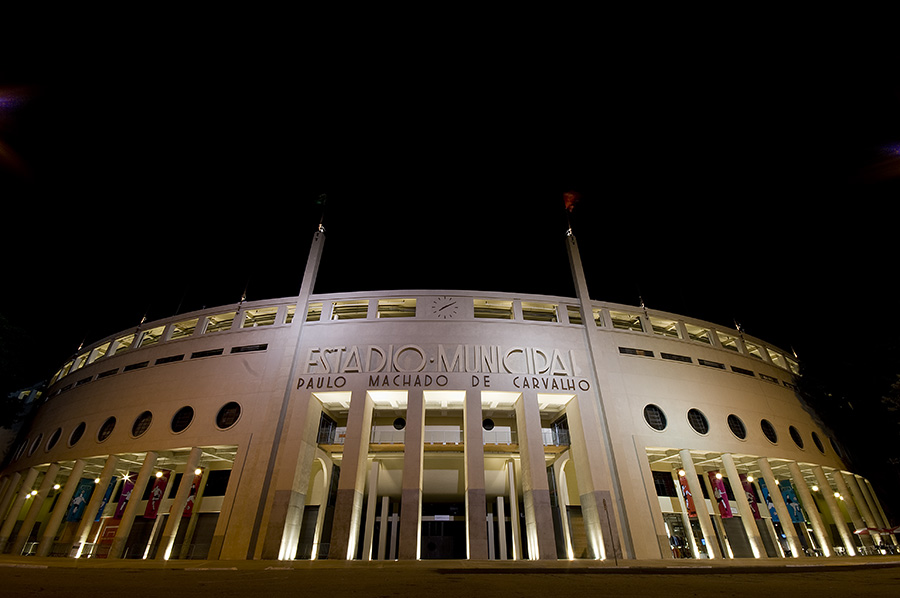
Pacaembu Stadium

== See also ==
- ABCD Region
- São Paulo (song)
- Japanese cuisine in São Paulo
- Large Cities Climate Leadership Group
- Largest cities in the Americas
- List of municipalities in the state of São Paulo by population
- OPENCities
- Caminhada Noturna (night walk)
- Department of Historic Heritage of São Paulo
