= Brooklin Novo =

- Neighborhood in São Paulo
- Location within São Paulo Location within Brazil
- Coordinates: 23°36′26″S 46°41′17″W
- Country: Brazil
- Region: Southeast
- State: São Paulo
- Municipality: São Paulo
- Administrative Zone: West
- Subprefecture: Pinheiros
- District: Itaim Bibi

Brooklin Novo (Portuguese for "New Brooklyn") is a neighborhood in São Paulo, Brazil. It is delimited by Bandeirantes Avenue, Marginal Pinheiros, and Santo Amaro Avenue in the Itaim Bibi District of the city. It is bordered by the neighborhoods of Brooklin Velho, Vila Olímpia, Moema, Vila Cordeiro, and the district of Morumbi.

== History ==
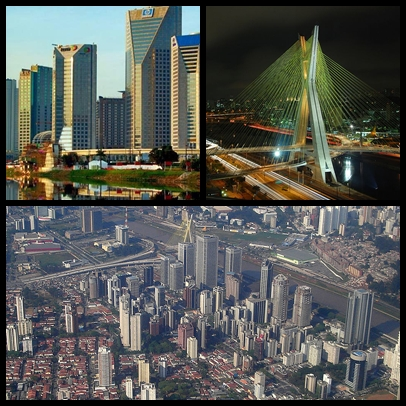
Brooklin, in São Paulo.

Given its proximity to the neighborhood of Vila Olimpia, the neighborhood essentially has the same history, because both were created and developed at the same time. It lies in the floodplain of the Rio Pinheiros, which historically inundated the region.

In 1941, the Paulista Equestrian Society, an important sporting institution in the country, was established. Years later, the area became residential houses and townhouses for middle-class families.

From 1980 onwards, the area went through a process of gentrification by the city council and state government. These improvements attracted a huge industry for the construction of residential and commercial investment. In the 2000s, the Berrini station of CPTM Line 9 (Emerald) and Octávio Frias de Oliveira Bridge were constructed and opened, making the area one of the major financial centers of the city.

== Characteristics ==
Today, the area is residential and commercial and is one of the key financial centers of São Paulo. The neighborhood's principal highway is the Engenheiro Luís Carlos Berrini Avenue which has about 100 commercial buildings along the route through the neighborhood. It houses the headquarters of multinational companies, luxury hotels, central TV channels and consulates.

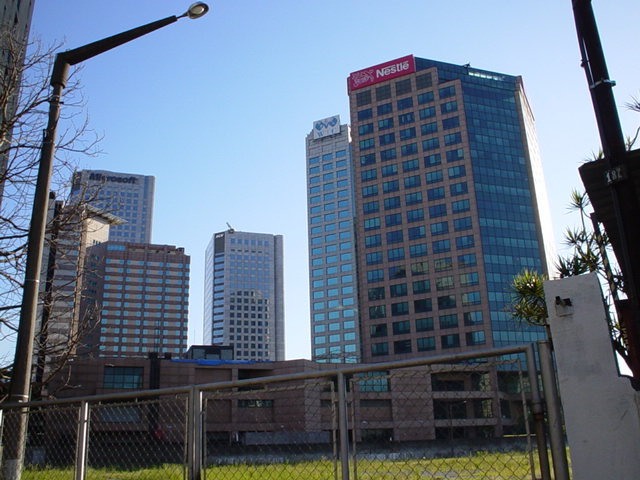
Headquarters of Nestlé, Centro Empresarial Nações Unidas and World Trade Center São Paulo.

On display are various icons of modern architecture in the city, like the Centro Empresarial Nações Unidas business complex where some of the largest buildings in the country are located. It has an underground connection with the World Trade Center São Paulo, another business complex. In front of the Centro Empresarial Nações Unidas, is the Octávio Frias de Oliveira Bridge, which today is one of the most famous postcards of the city. Other landmarks include the Mandarin Building (the tallest residential building in the city) and the Plaza Centenário.

Its residents, "Brooklinians", are represented by the Sociedade Amigos do Brooklin Novo, an institution that aims to maintain the existing green areas and preserve the horizontality of the region. The area is policed by the 4th Company of the 12th Military Police Battalion and the Civil Police are located in the 96th Police District - Brooklin.
