= Centro Empresarial Nações Unidas =

Commercial complex in Brazil

Coordinates: 23.61056°S 46.69711°W

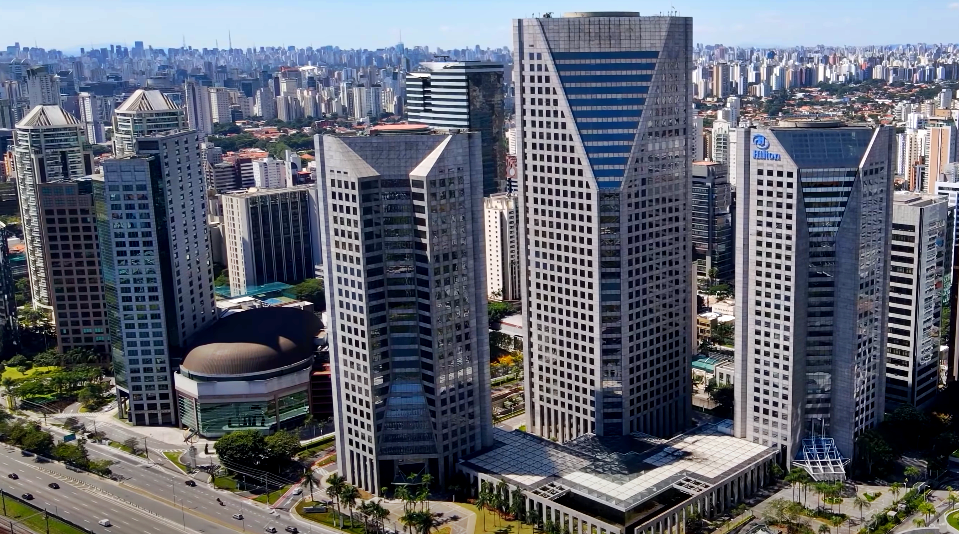
View of CENU - Centro Empresarial Nações Unidas

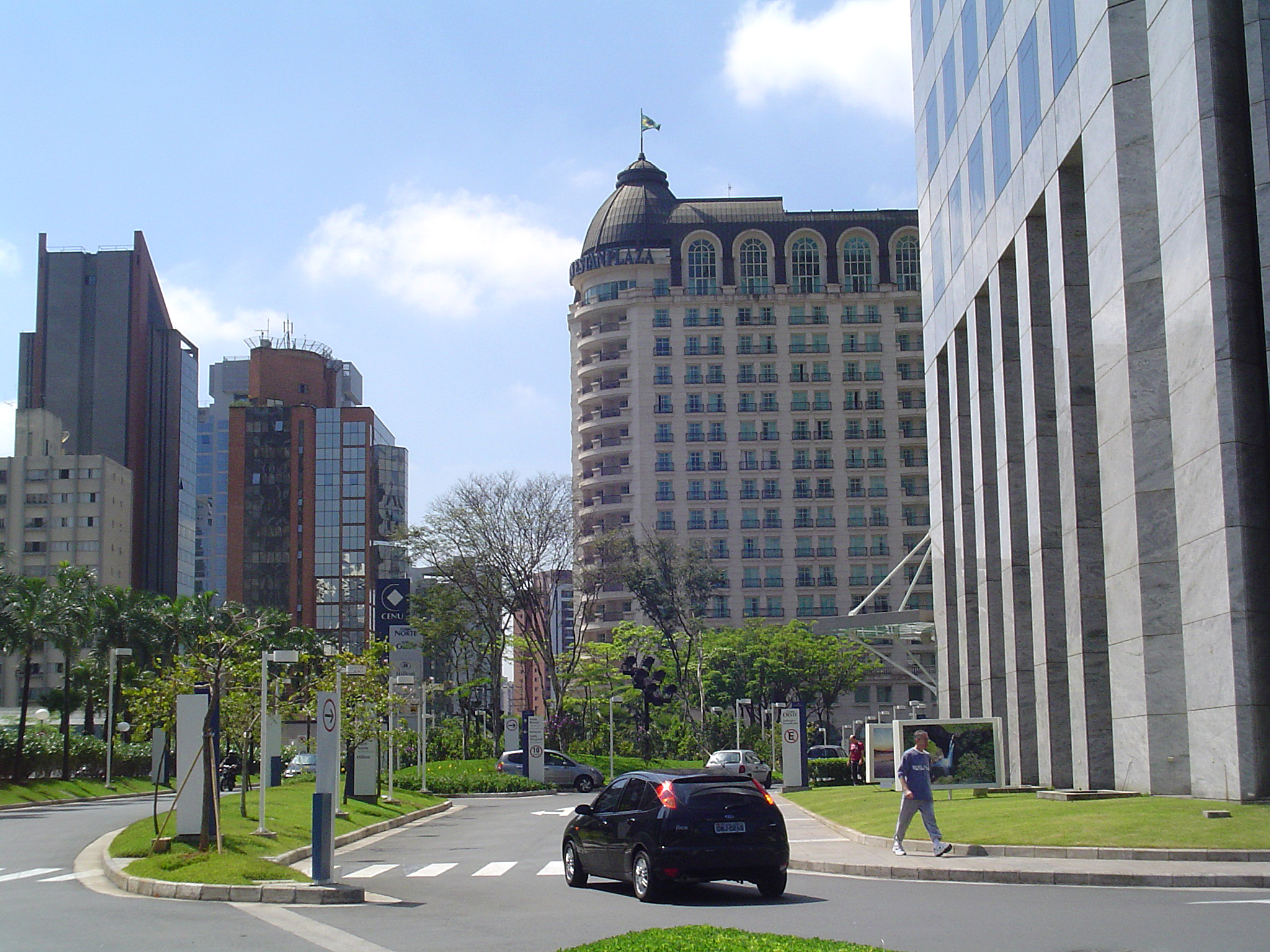
Entrance along Engenheiro Luís Carlos Berrini Avenue.

The United Nations Business Center (Portuguese: Centro Empresarial Nações Unidas) is a commercial complex located in the city of São Paulo, in the Brooklin Novo neighborhood in the district of Santo Amaro. It is located between the Marginal Pinheiros and Engenheiro Luís Carlos Berrini Avenue, with the main entrance along Engenheiro Luís Carlos Berrini Avenue. It has 277,446.18 square metres (2,986,405.8 sq ft) of building area, including shopping center and the West, North, and East Towers. Started in 1989, the project was completed around the year 2000, due to economic problems.

- The North Tower, the tallest of the complex, is one of the largest buildings in Brazil, with a height of 158 metres (518 ft) and 152,000 square metres (1,640,000 sq ft) of constructed area. Currently, the tower is home to several multinational companies, including, Microsoft, Hewlett-Packard, Monsanto, Towers Watson, and GVT Global Village Telecom.
- The East Tower had to be redesigned internally to accommodate a luxury hotel, the Hilton – Morumbi.
- The West Tower is used for offices
- The South Tower has 18 floors
- Plaza I has 17 floors

The complex has an underground connection with the business complex nearby, the World Trade Center São Paulo. On November 8, 2008, the complex hosted the G20 meeting.

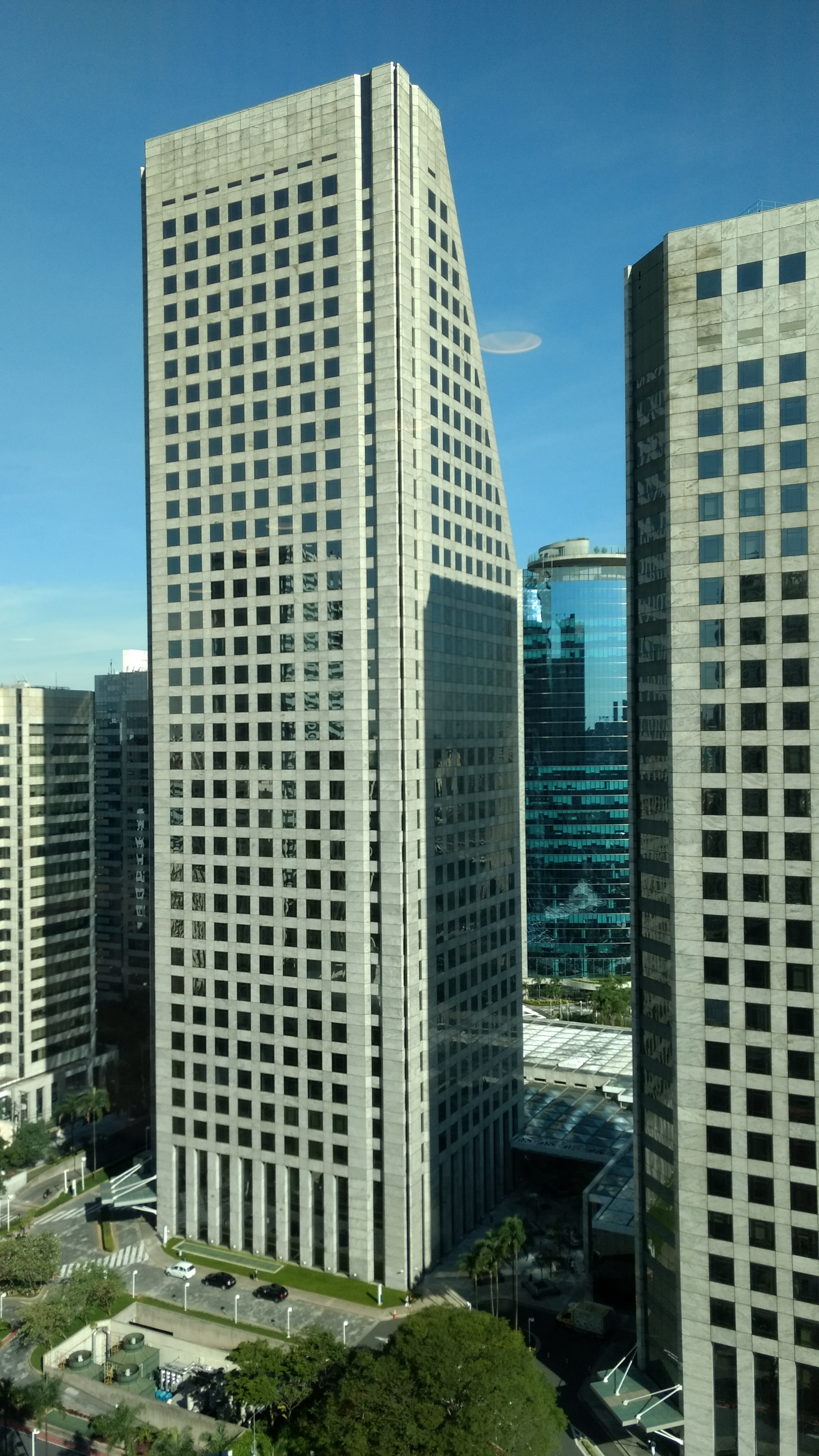

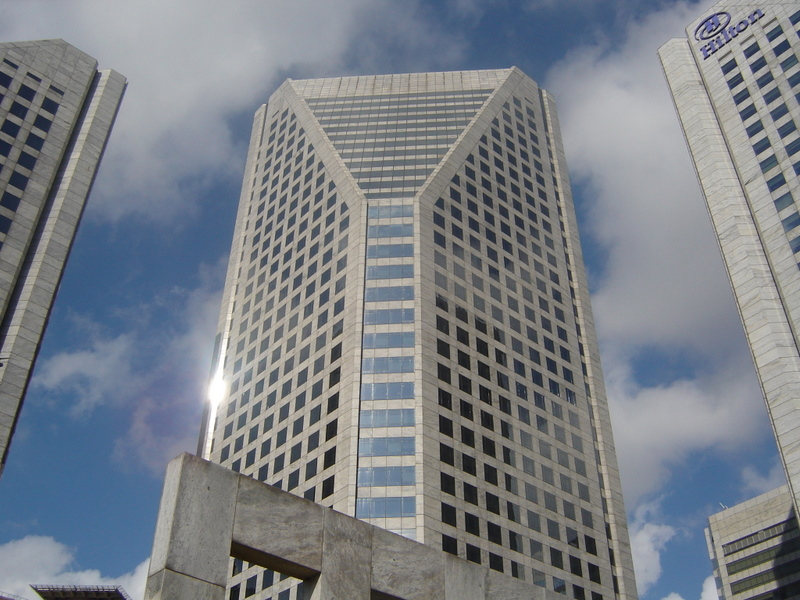

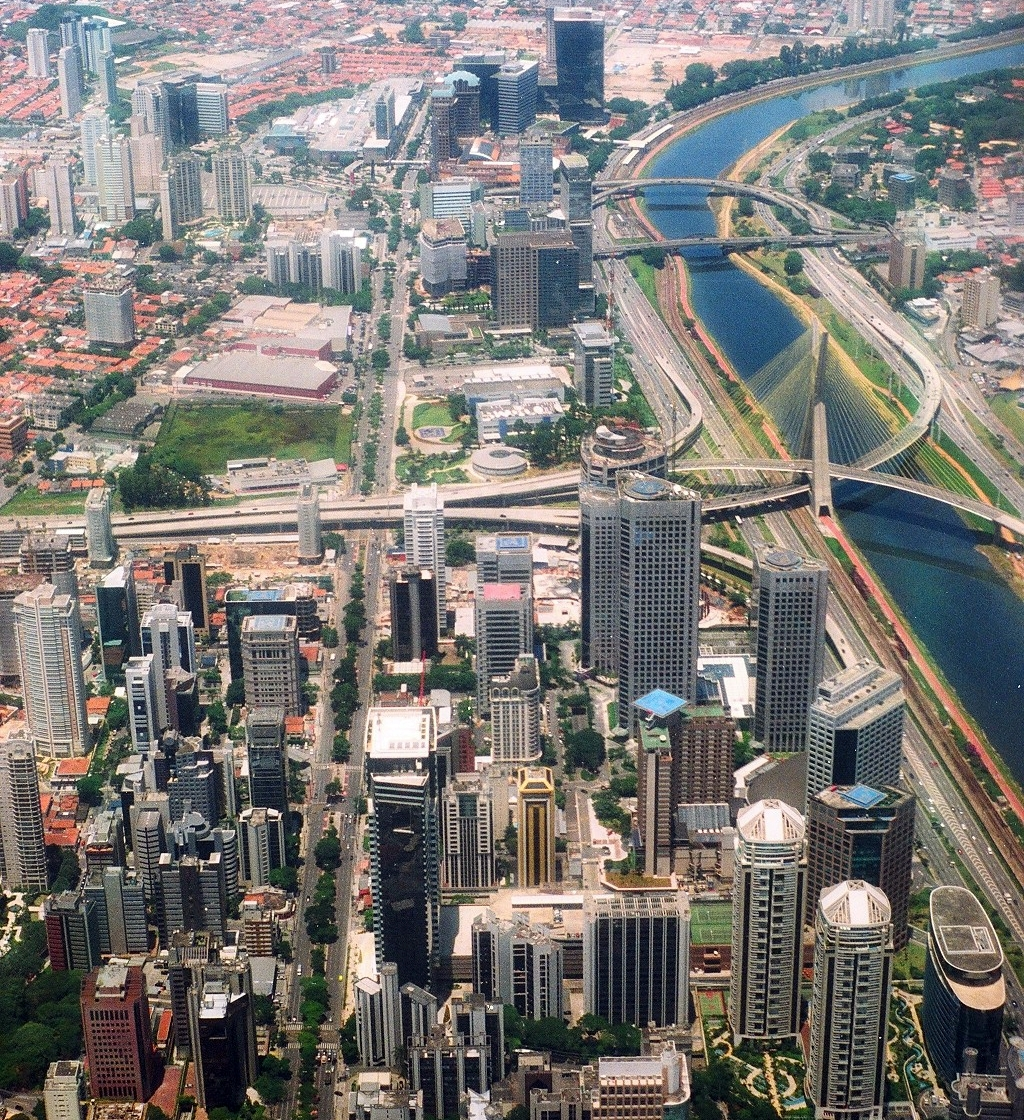

== See also ==
- List of tallest buildings in South America
- List of tallest buildings in Brazil
- Mirante do Vale
- Altino Arantes Building
