= Radial Leste (São Paulo) =

Arterial road in São Paulo, Brazil

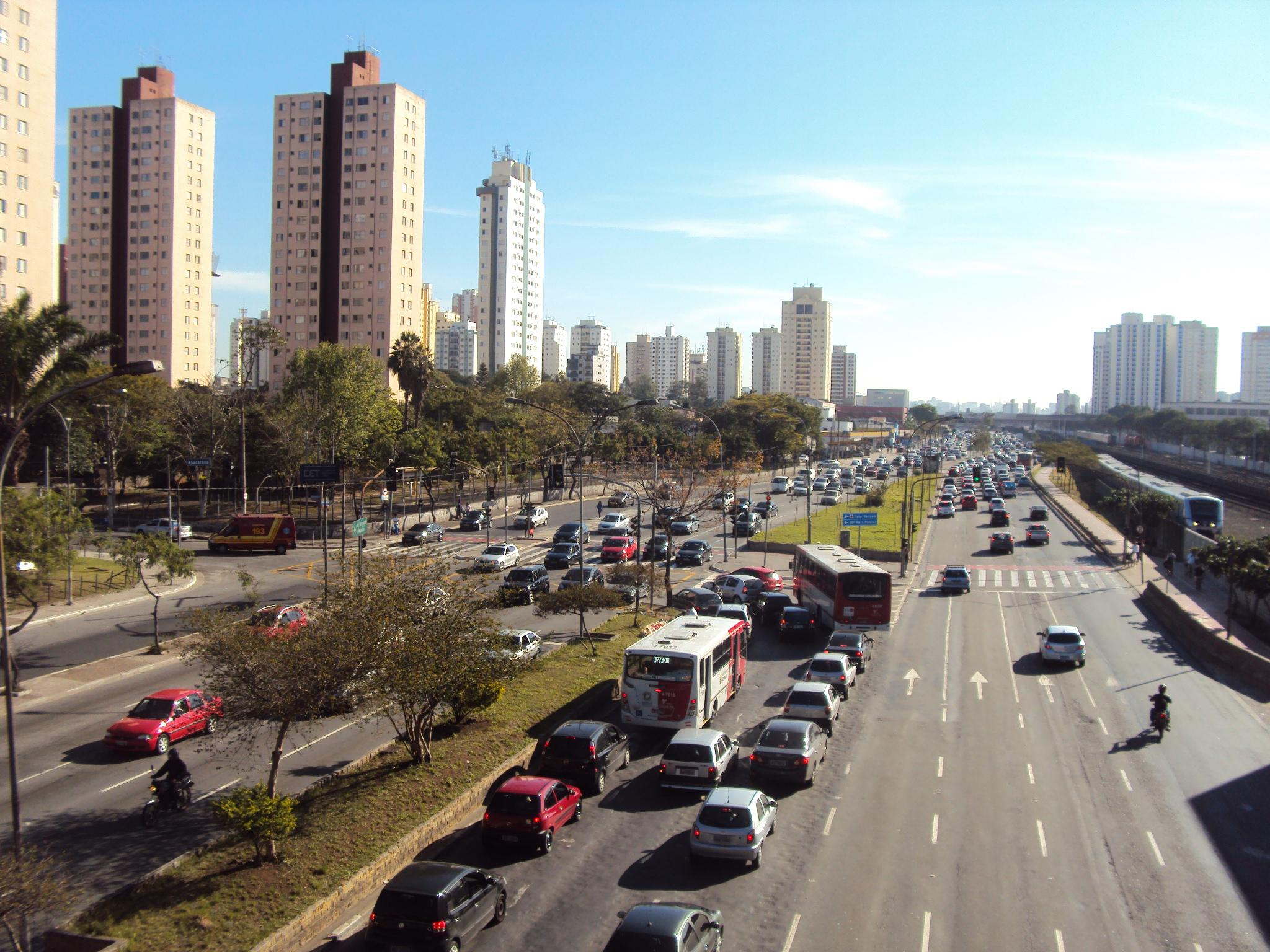
- Radial Leste in the Carrão district.

Route information
- Length: 23.6 km (14.7 mi)
- Existed: 1957–present

Major junctions
- Center end: Figueira Street in São Paulo, SP
- East end: Guaianases train station in São Paulo, SP

Location
- Country: Brazil
- State: São Paulo

Highway system
- Highways in Brazil; Federal

The Radial Leste is a major arterial road in São Paulo, Brazil, running across the city's entire eastern axis toward the central region. It serves the subprefectures of Mooca, Penha, Itaquera, and Guaianases and acts as the primary connection between São Paulo and the municipality of Ferraz de Vasconcelos. In the direction from the city center to the neighborhoods, Radial Leste begins in the Parque Dom Pedro II area at Figueira Street. However, its most significant vehicle flow originates from the Glicério elevated highway, which connects it to the East-West Link and State Avenue.

Planned in 1945, the road was designed to alleviate traffic congestion on Rangel Pestana and Celso Garcia avenues. The name "Radial" refers to the road's conceptual design as a radius extending from the center of São Paulo within a circular network of avenues and streets in the central region. Due to its strategic location, the road is one of the main routes linking São Paulo's East Zone with the city center. Running parallel to Line 3 of the São Paulo Metro, Radial Leste also features a stretch of bicycle lane, inaugurated in 2008.

The Radial Leste was widely regarded as one of the most dangerous roads for drivers and pedestrians during the 1970s. In 1974 alone, it recorded 1,538 accidents, resulting in 2,023 victims. Reports from that time describe a dire situation caused by a lack of proper signage combined with reckless driving, as many drivers sped excessively, leading to frequent accidents. The situation was so severe that an ambulance was stationed on the road from 7 a.m. to 10 p.m. to assist the injured. Today, the road is no longer considered one of the most dangerous in the city.

== History ==
The project to construct the Radial Leste was introduced in 1945 by Prestes Maia, who was the mayor of São Paulo at the time. However, construction only began twelve years later, in 1957. At that time, Rangel Pestana and Celso Garcia Avenues were heavily congested due to the high volume of cars, streetcar lines, and buses in the area. The Radial Leste was conceived as a necessary alternative to alleviate traffic on these avenues and to offer drivers an additional route. A significant portion of the land used for the avenue's construction belonged to the Central do Brasil Railway, which facilitated the project's implementation.

The first segment of the Radial Leste, connecting Parque Dom Pedro II to the Brás district of São Paulo, was completed in August 1957, marked by the inauguration of the viaduct over the tracks of the Santos to Jundiaí Railway. The new road spurred real estate speculation in the area and encouraged the development and settlement of São Paulo's eastern region, which would go on to become the city's most populous area within a few decades.

After more than a decade of inactivity, the extension of the Radial Leste from the Tatuapé region to Vila Matilde resumed in 1966 under Mayor José Vicente Faria Lima. On May 17, 1967, an additional 800-meter stretch between Presidente Kennedy Square (near Trilhos Street) and Bresser Street was inaugurated, along with the 1,150-meter Alcântara Machado viaduct.

Initially, much of the Radial Leste intersected with the Central Railway line, requiring level crossings. The increased traffic on the new thoroughfare led to frequent use of these crossings, which in turn caused numerous accidents involving trains and vehicles. In the early 1970s, the construction of the Bresser, Guadalajara, and Conselheiro Carrão viaducts eliminated the level crossings at Bresser and Belarmino Matos Streets.

Accidents on Radial Leste reached their peak in 1977, when a bus broke through the level crossing gate at Artur Alvim station and collided with a suburban train, resulting in the deaths of 22 passengers and injuries to 17 others. In 1974 alone, the road saw 1,538 accidents and 2,023 victims, a situation attributed to a combination of insufficient signage and reckless driving. The situation was so severe that an ambulance was stationed on the road from 7 a.m. to 10 p.m. to assist the injured.

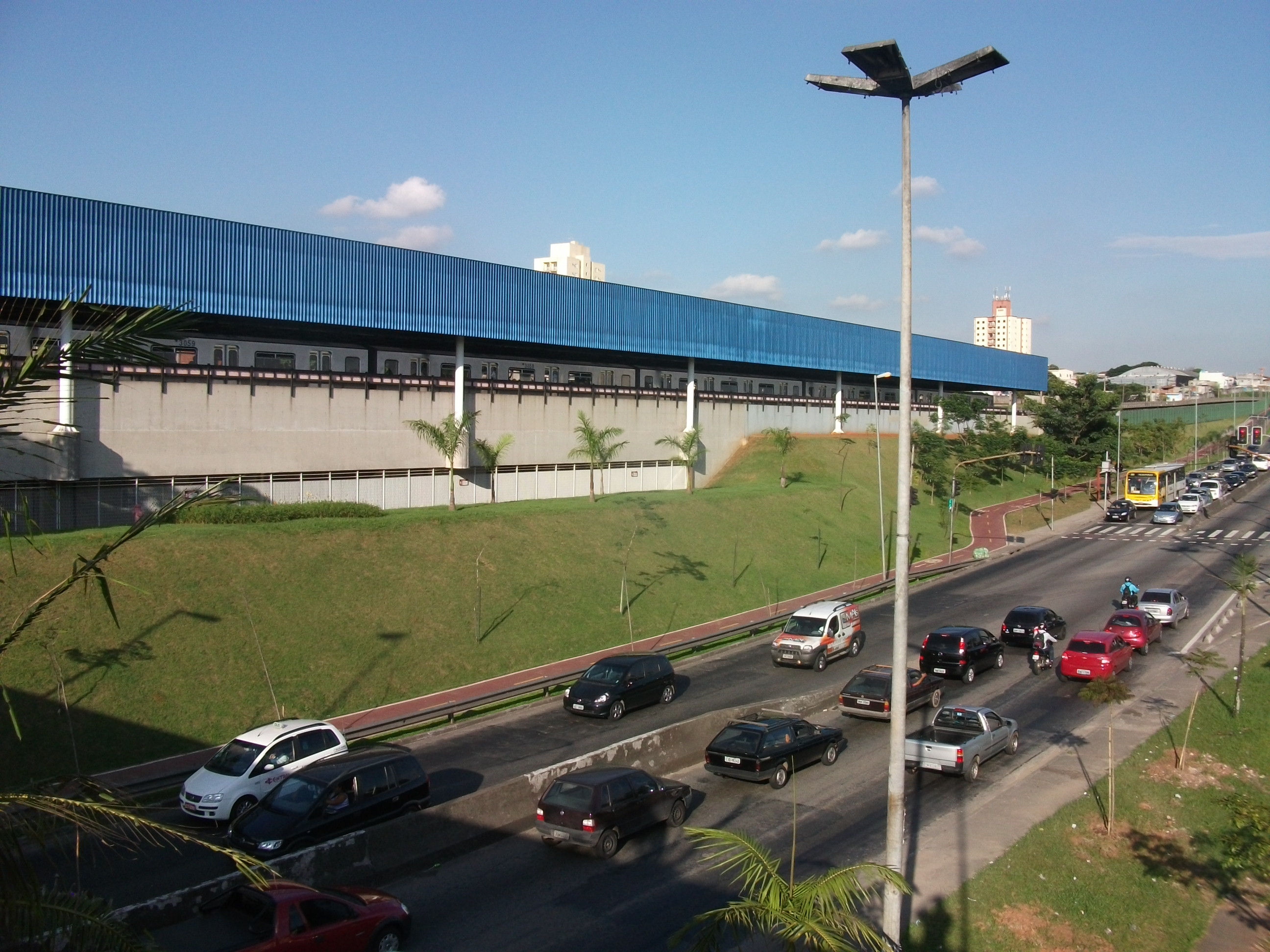
View of the Radial Leste from the Patriarca - Vila Ré subway station.

During this period, construction had begun on the East-West Line of the São Paulo Metro (now Line 3-Red). The city council used the metro expansion as an opportunity to redevelop parts of the surrounding areas and to construct several viaducts, pedestrian walkways, embankments, and other infrastructure. In October 1978, a new 700-meter stretch of the road was inaugurated in the Vila Matilde region, while construction of additional segments extending to Itaquera progressed alongside the metro's expansion.

In 2008, then-Mayor Gilberto Kassab inaugurated a new section of the Radial Leste extension, including a tunnel under Águia de Haia Avenue in the Artur Alvim district. By 2011, the City Hall had already completed the tender process for extending the Radial Leste from Itaquera to Guaianases. The project, estimated to cost 131 million reais, was awarded to the Pontal Leste Consortium, led by Construtora OAS of the OAS Group. Following the contract's signing in early February, the consortium was given two years to complete the new section, aiming for delivery before the 2014 FIFA World Cup.

However, the extension was not completed within the expected timeframe. The 3.5-kilometer stretch is regarded as essential for attracting businesses and improving services in the far eastern region between Artur Alvim and Guaianases. Completion of the project was later projected for 2016.

Radial Leste remains one of the busiest roads in São Paulo, handling the highest vehicle volume among the city's most critical routes, with an average of 2.7 vehicles passing per second during peak hours.

== Official names ==
Radial Leste is an informal term used to refer to the road, as it comprises several sections with different official names along its length:

- Alcântara Machado Avenue: between Dom Pedro II Park and Salim Farah Maluf Avenue.
- Pires do Rio Viaduct: over Salim Farah Maluf Avenue.
- Mello Freire Street: between Salim Farah Maluf Avenue and Antônio de Barros Street.
- Conde de Frontin Avenue: between Antônio de Barros Street and Joaquim Marra Street, in Vila Matilde.
- Antônio Estêvão de Carvalho Avenue: between Joaquim Marra Street and Patriarca - Vila Ré Subway Station.
- Doutor Luís Aires Street: from Patriarca - Vila Ré Subway Station to Artur Alvim Subway Station.
- Sport Club Corinthians Paulista Avenue: from Artur Alvim Subway Station to Corinthians-Itaquera Subway Station.
- José Pinheiro Borges Avenue: from Corinthians-Itaquera Subway Station to Guaianases CPTM Station.

== Cycle paths ==
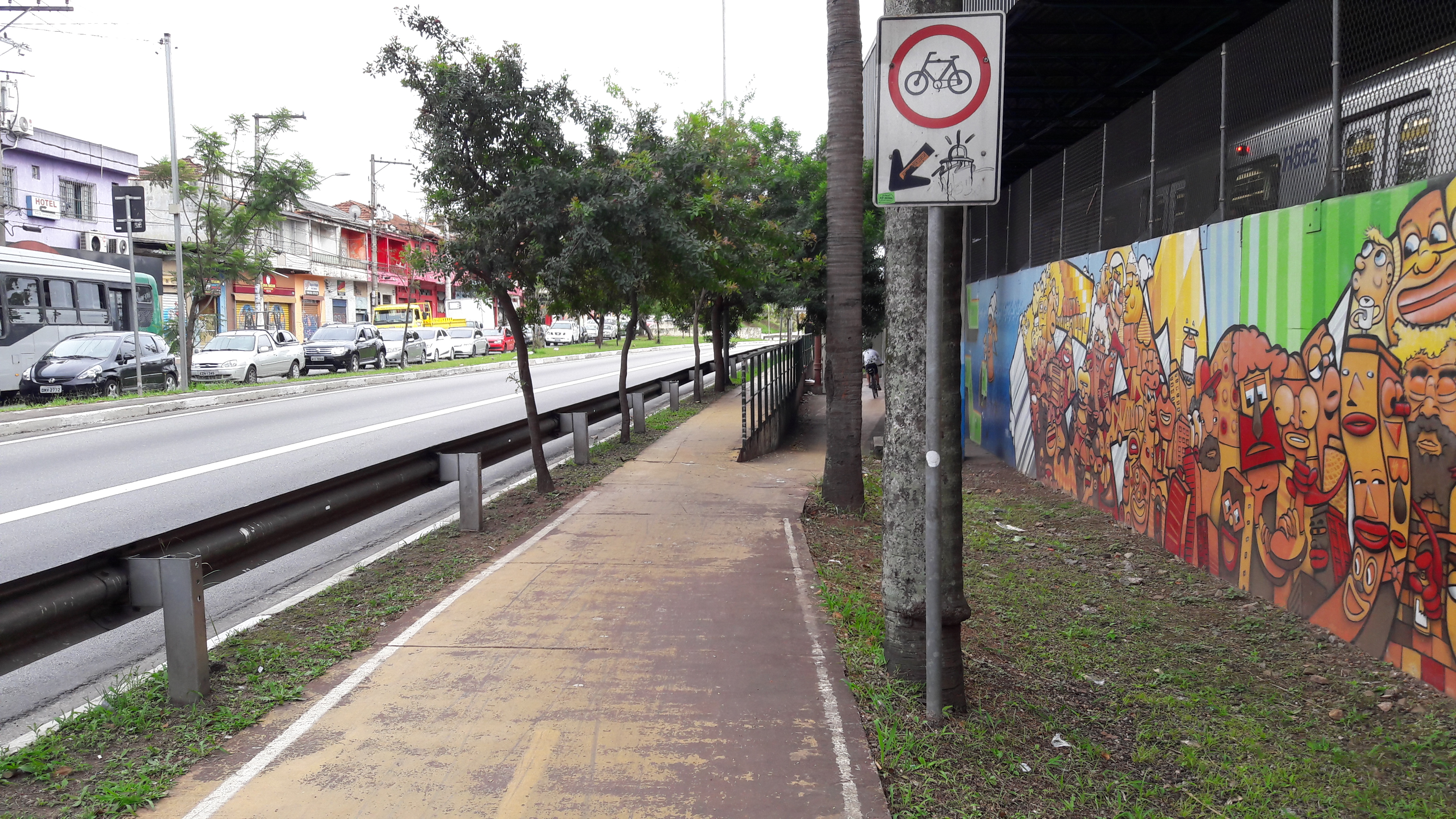
The cycle path is located on Radial Leste in São Paulo.

A 12.2-kilometer bike path, called "Ciclovia Caminho Verde," was inaugurated in 2008 during the administration of then-Mayor Gilberto Kassab. The bike path runs alongside Line 3 of the Metro. This stretch, which features gardens, trees, and flat topography, connects Tatuapé Station to Corinthians Itaquera Station, following the subway line. It attracts cyclists both as a means of transportation and as a recreational area.

In October 2014, during Mayor Fernando Haddad's administration, the municipal transport secretary, Jilmar Tatto, announced a partnership between the City Hall and the Metro to extend the bike path, linking the Parque Dom Pedro II region to the Tatuapé Metro Station. This extension would create a direct route for cyclists from the Itaquera region to the city center. The planned extension will integrate the Jardim Helena bike path with the Radial Leste bike path, forming a major circulation axis connecting downtown São Paulo to the far eastern part of the city. This stretch is expected to be between six and eight kilometers long and will connect with other bike paths in the city center, facilitating cycling mobility.

== Establishments and commerce ==
Along the Radial Leste, there are various types of establishments, including thirteen car dealerships, thirteen restaurants, ten gas stations, six schools, five motels, three hospitals, three supermarkets, two sex shops, two nightclubs, three shopping malls in the vicinity, a tailor shop, two bank branches, and two pet shops.

== Speed reduction ==
During the administration of Mayor Fernando Haddad, the maximum speed limit on the main arterial roads in São Paulo was reduced to 50 km/h. Under the supervision of the Municipal Secretary of Transport, Jilmar Tatto, this speed reduction was implemented across the city, with exceptions for the North-South Corridor between Bandeira Terminal and Bandeirantes Avenue, as well as the central and express lanes of the marginal roads. The speed limit change is part of the São Paulo Traffic Engineering Company's "Life Protection Program," which aims to improve safety for the most vulnerable road users, such as pedestrians and cyclists, and to reduce traffic accidents.

The Radial Leste and the roads forming the East-West Axis also saw their speed limits reduced from 60 km/h to 50 km/h, as part of a plan proposed by former Mayor Fernando Haddad on September 11, 2015.

== 4KM Project ==
During the 2014 FIFA World Cup, the wall separating Radial Leste, the main access road to the Corinthians Arena, from the 3-Vermelha subway line became home to the 4KM project, making it the largest open-air graffiti corridor in Latin America. Developed by the State Department of Tourism and the São Paulo Committee for the World Cup, with funding from both the government and the private sector, the project received 502 graffiti proposals from 389 artists. However, only 70 were selected.

The murals, located on the wall between the Patriarca-Vila Ré and Corinthians-Itaquera stations, near the Corinthians Arena, explored three main themes: tourism in São Paulo, Brazilian fans, and soccer (themes chosen in celebration of the 2014 World Cup being held in Brazil). Artists could also choose to explore other, free themes for their works. The graffiti is visible only to pedestrians along the avenue, not to those inside the subway cars. Each artist was allocated a space 50 meters long by 2.5 meters high, with 40 liters of latex paint and 60 spray paint cans. The government invested R$1.3 million in the project, while an additional R$500,000 came from sponsors, such as Nike. Each of the 70 selected graffiti artists received R$6,500 for their contributions.

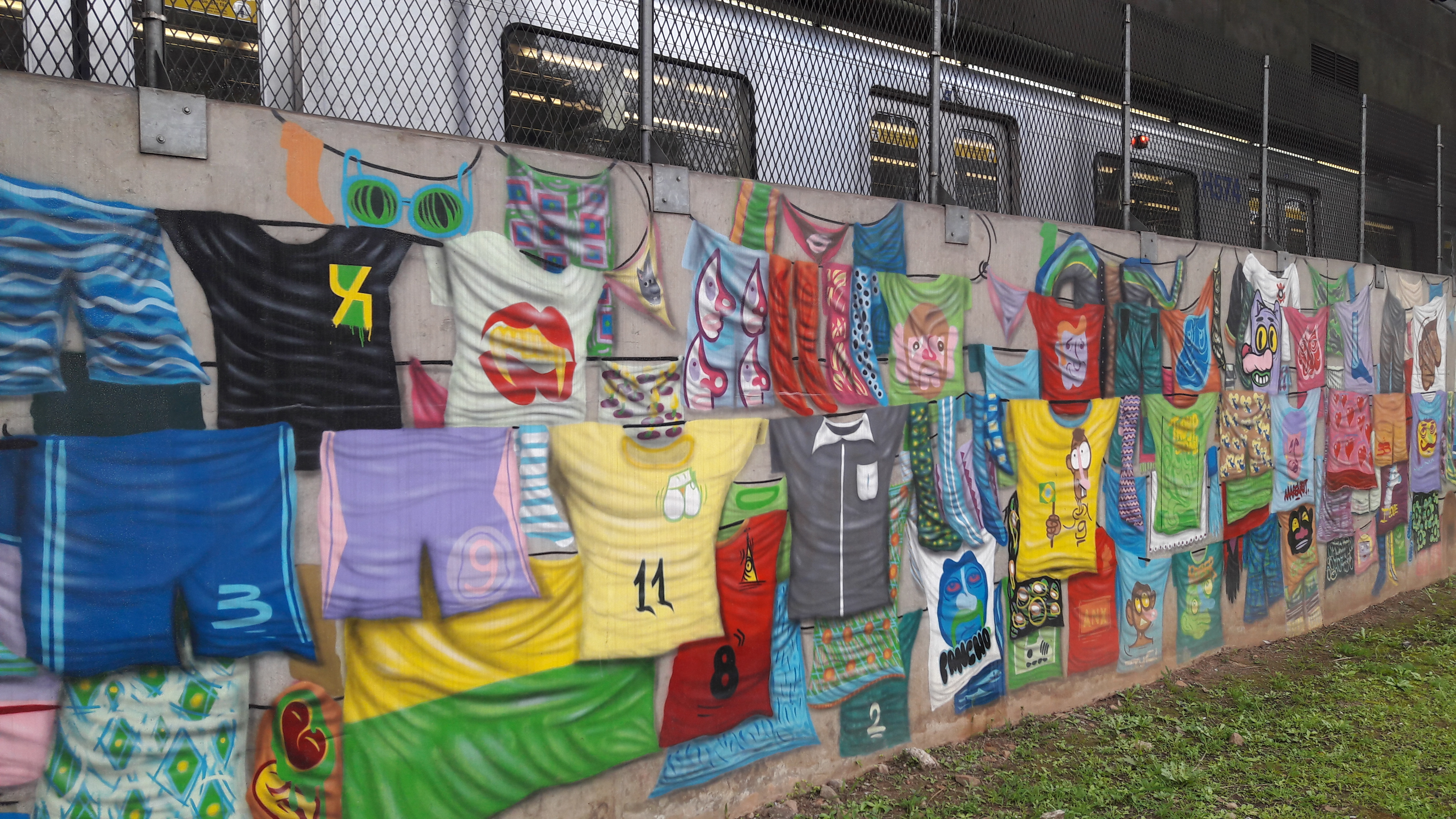
View of the wall graffitied by the 4KM project on Radial Leste.

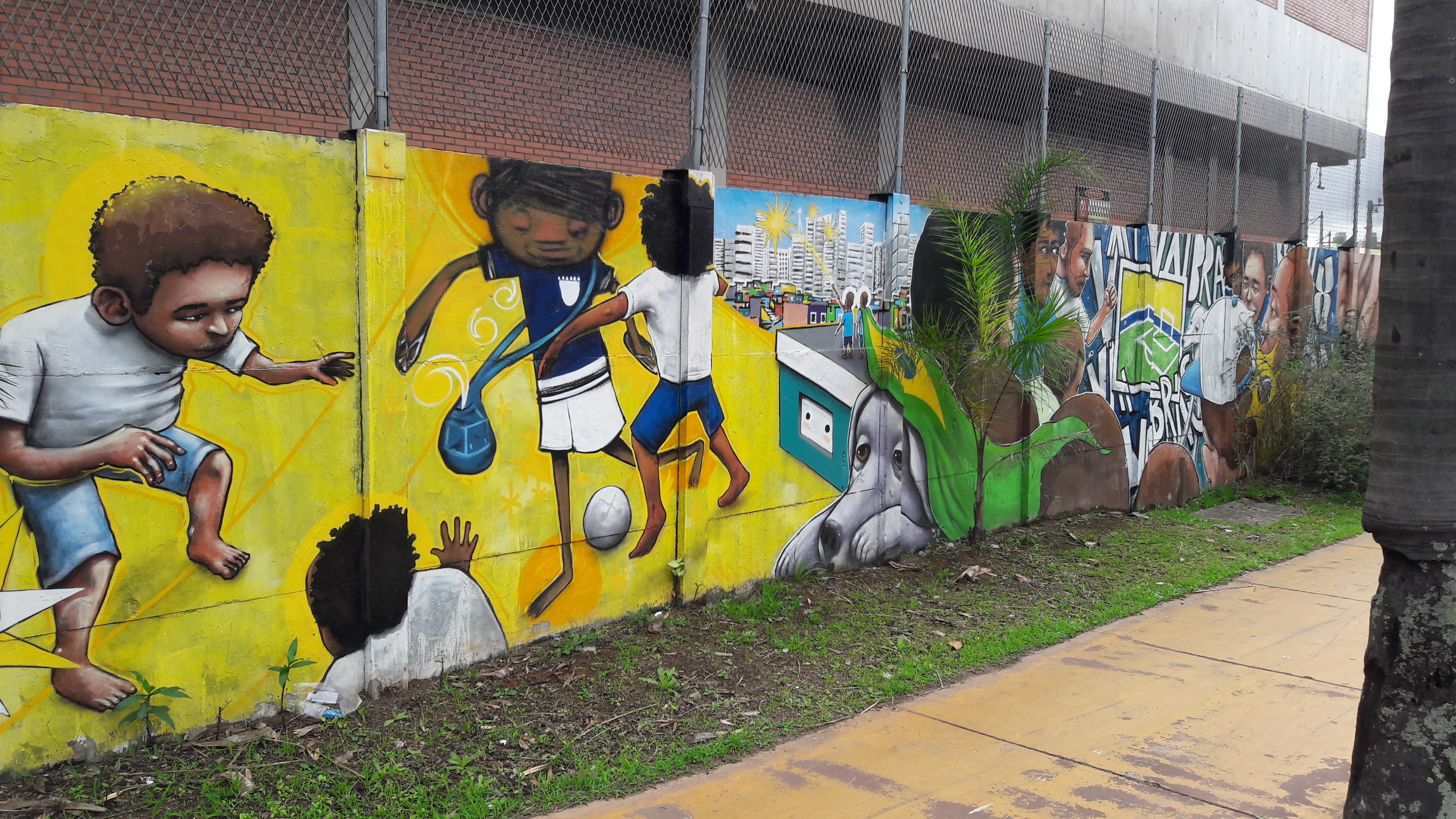
The image refers to the wall of the Artur Alvim Subway Station.

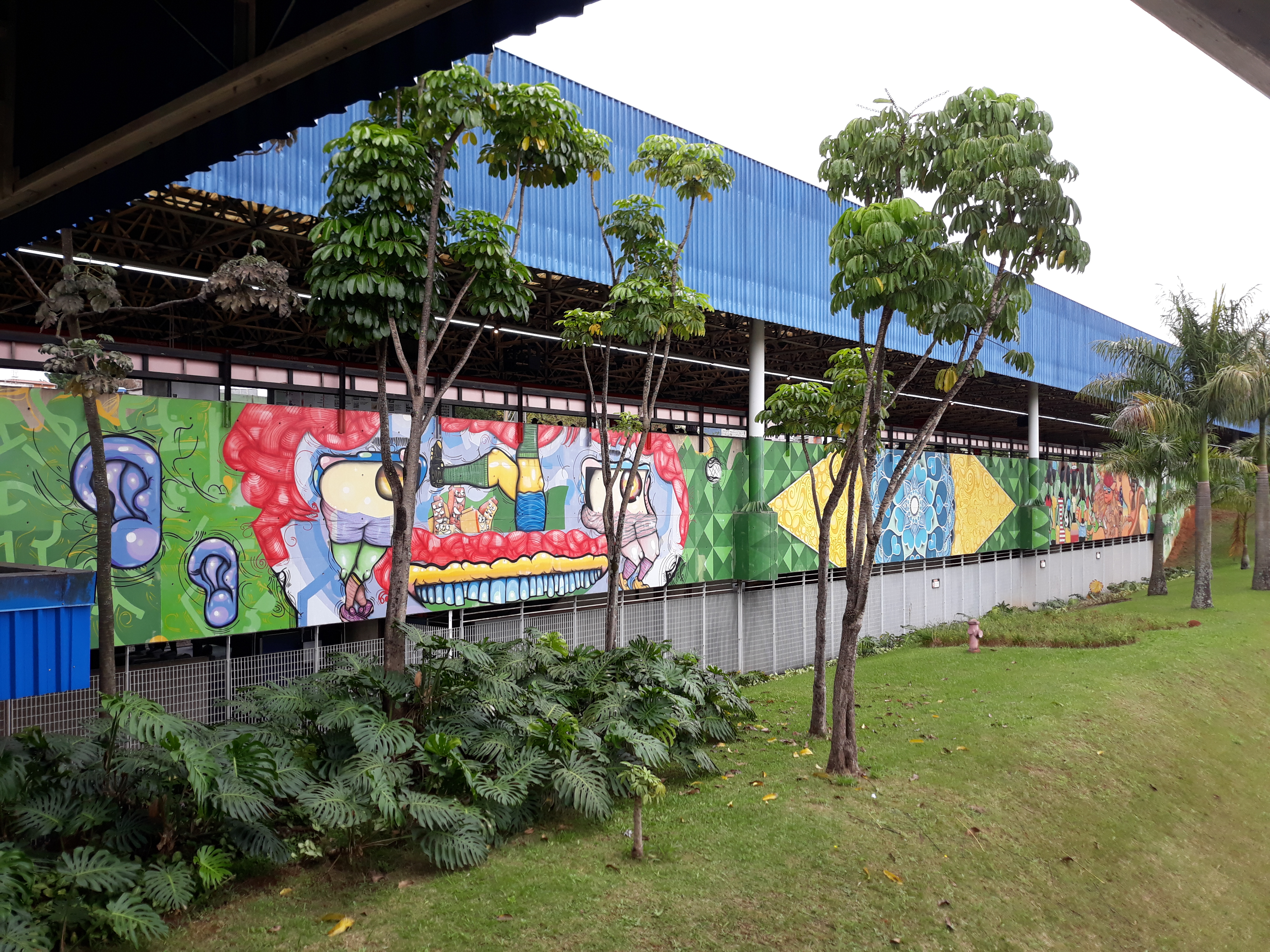
Graffiti mural at the height of Patriarca-Vila Ré Station.

== Curiosidades ==
=== Creation ===
The avenue was designed to be a radius within a circumference, hence the name “Radial”. Another important avenue with this characteristic is 23 de Maio Avenue. The creation of Radial Leste was the result that the city government of the time found to reduce the congestion present on the surrounding avenues, such as Rangel Pestana and Celso Garcia.

=== Accidents ===
Considered one of the most dangerous places for pedestrians and drivers during the 1970s, the Radial recorded more than 1,500 accidents in just one year. Because of this reputation, ambulances were kept along the avenue throughout the day to help with accidents that occurred with a certain frequency throughout the day.

=== Housing and neighborhood ===
The Avenue does not have many residential houses. Being among the busiest avenues in São Paulo, next to the Corinthians Arena and very noisy, means that residents who live there want to move away quickly, leaving the Corinthians Arena region practically isolated from residential areas.

=== Traffic ===
The Radial Leste is the city's busiest thoroughfare when it comes to honking horns, due to the huge flow of motorcycles and cars.

== See also ==
- Bandeirantes Avenue
- Marginal Pinheiros
- Paulista Avenue
- Marginal Tietê
