= Octávio Frias de Oliveira Bridge =

Cable-stayed bridge in the city of São Paulo, Brazil

Octávio Frias de Oliveira Bridge Ponte Octávio Frias de Oliveira
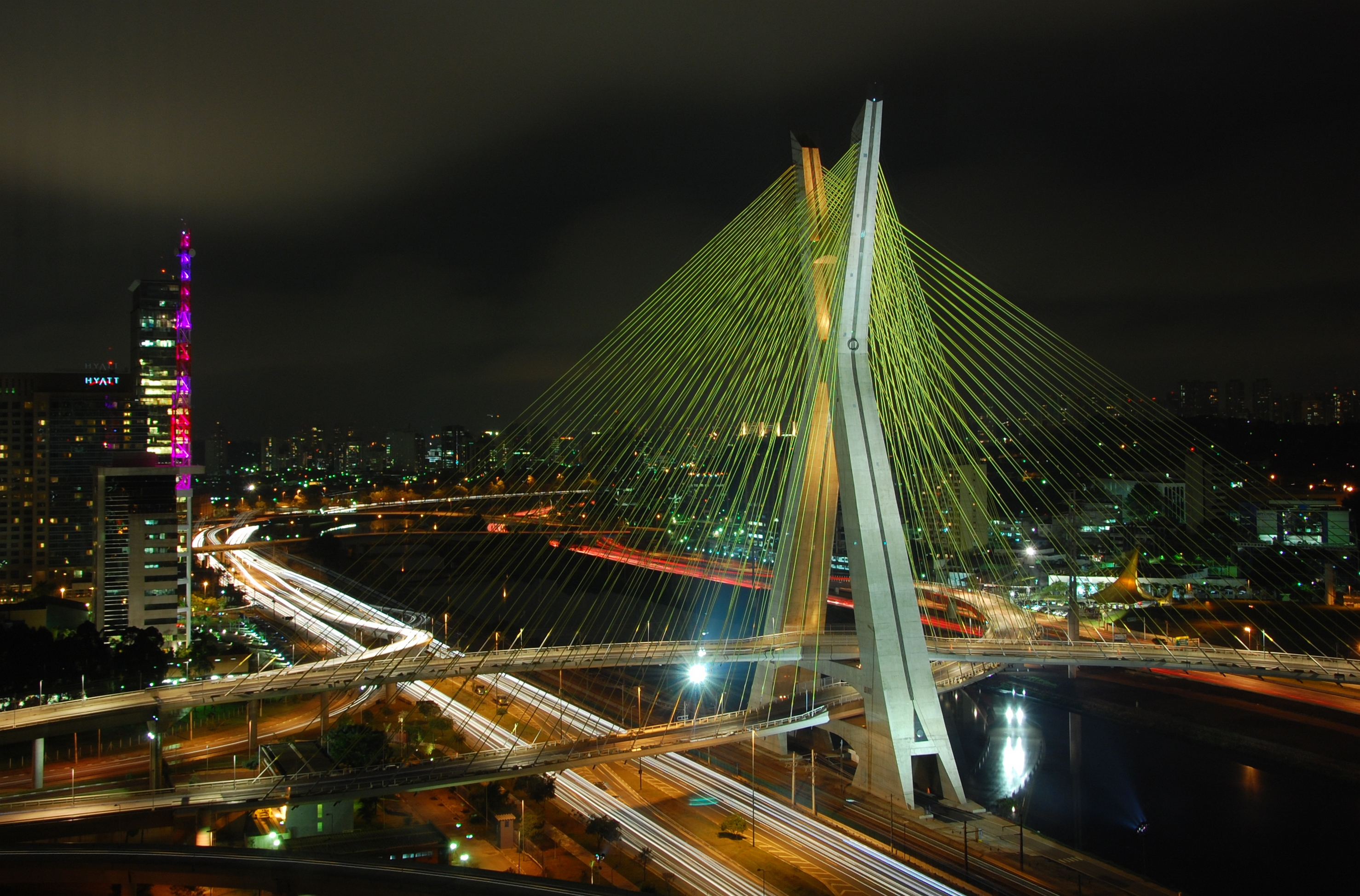
- Octavio Frias de Oliveira Bridge
- Coordinates: 23.61275°S 46.699239°W
- Carries: two oppositely curved roadways, three lanes each
- Crosses: Pinheiros River
- Locale: São Paulo, Brazil
- Other name: Ponte Estaiada

Characteristics
- Design: Cable-stayed bridge
- Material: Concrete sustained by stainless steel cables, coated with polyethylene resistant to sunlight
- Total length: 1,600 metres (5,200 ft) total for two roadways
- Width: 16 metres (52 ft) for each roadway
- Height: 138 metres (453 ft) (X-shaped tower)
- Longest span: 150 metres (490 ft) for each roadway; 290 metres (950 ft) total cable-stayed spans for each roadway

History
- Construction start: 2005
- Construction end: May 2008
- Opened: 10 May 2008; 18 years ago

Location

The Octavio Frias de Oliveira bridge, locally known simply as "Ponte Estaiada" (Portuguese: lit. 'Bridge Cable-stayed'), is a cable-stayed bridge over the Pinheiros River in the city of São Paulo, Brazil, opened in May 2008. The iconic bridge has an "X"-shaped tower, 138 metres (453 ft) tall, and connects the west end of Jornalista Roberto Marinho Avenue to the riverside expressway Marginal Pinheiros in the south area of the city. It is named after businessman Octavio Frias de Oliveira.

== Design ==
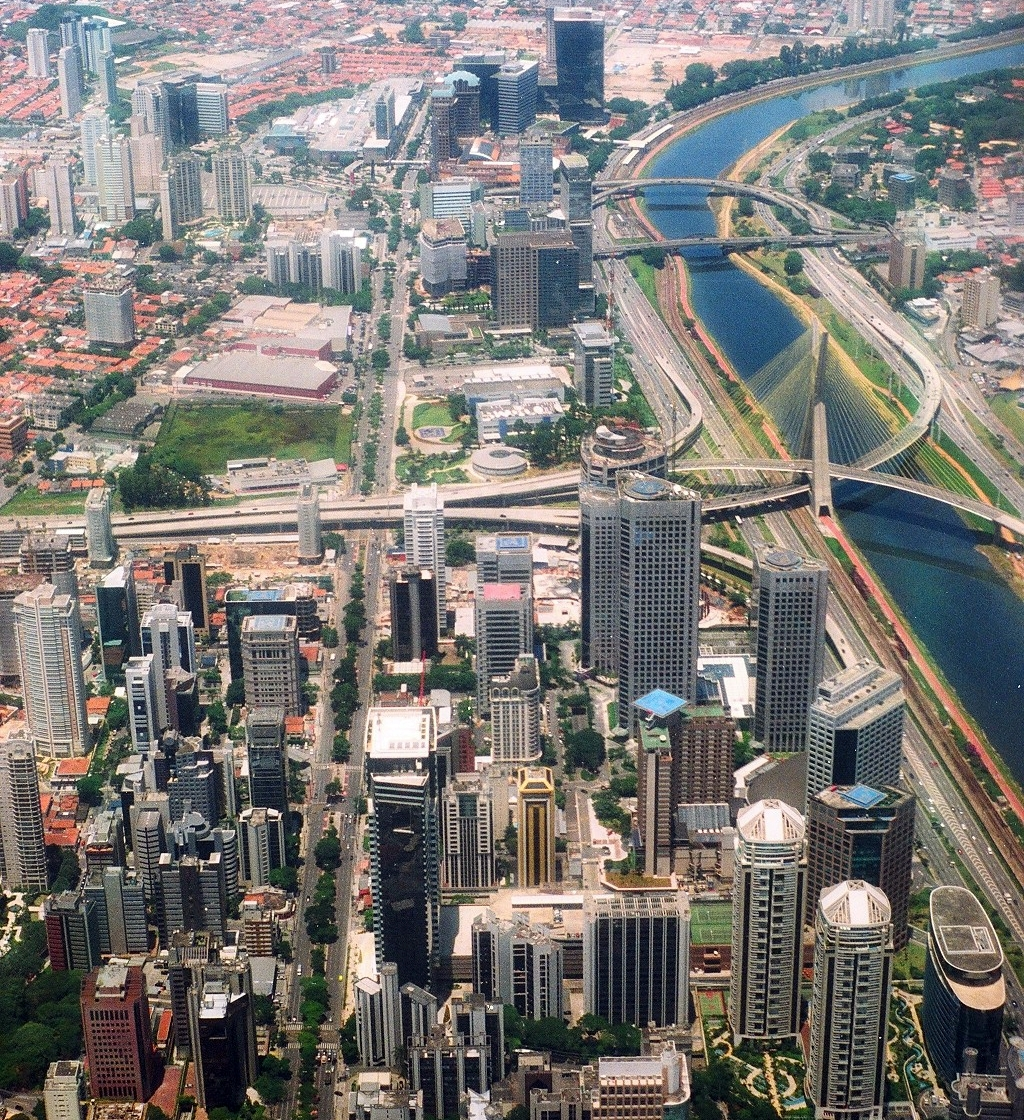
Aerial view looking south: Octávio Frias de Oliveira bridge, connecting the end of Jornalista Roberto Marinho Avenue across Pinheiros River to/from the southbound lanes of Marginal Pinheiros

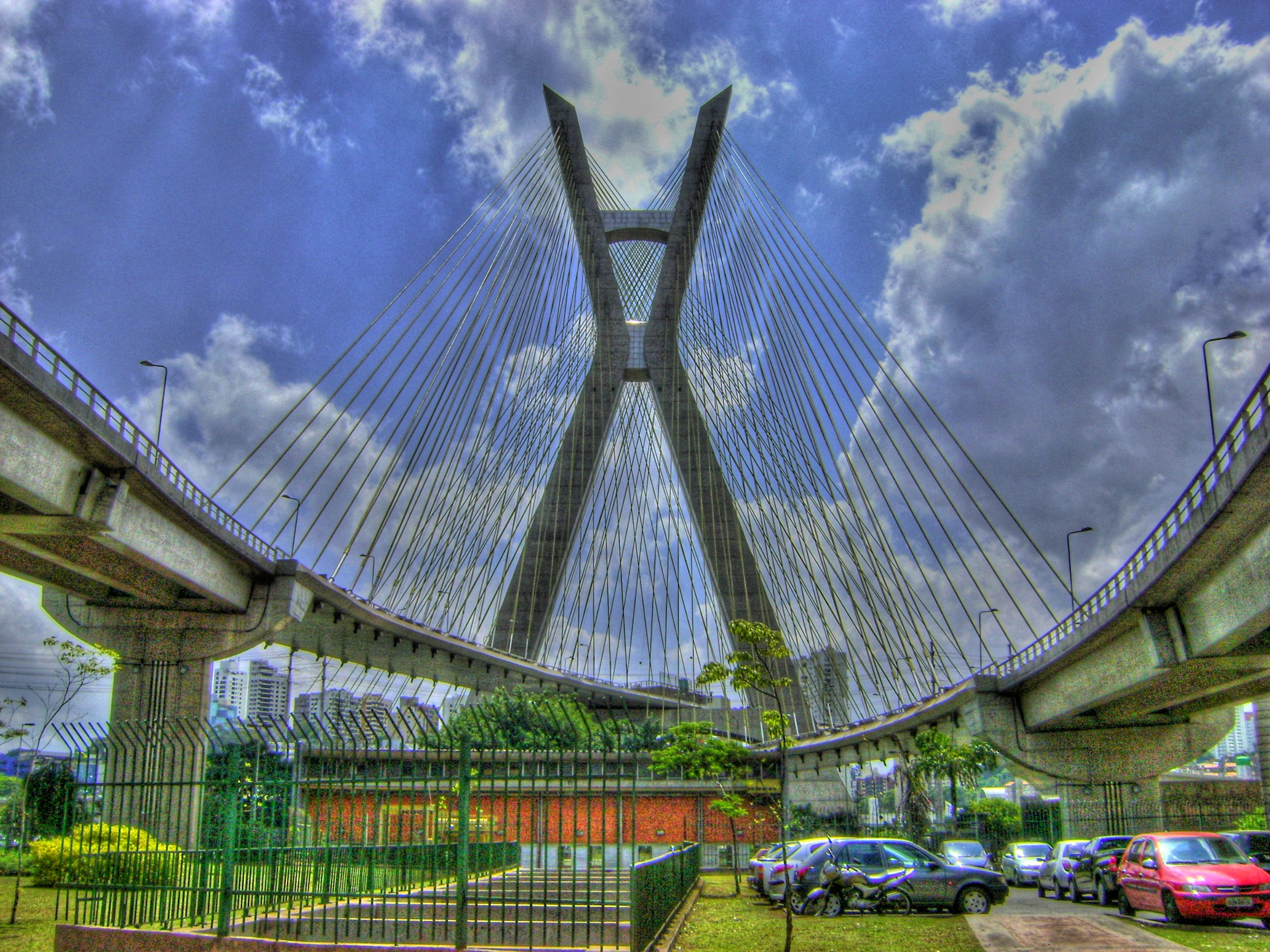
Looking west: "X"-shaped tower with two curved cable-stayed spans and two side piers at different elevations on the Roberto Marinho Avenue side

The bridge is composed of two cable-stayed curved roadways suspended from a single concrete "X"-shaped tower or pylon. It is the only bridge in the world that has two curved roadways supported by a single pylon.

The bridge, conceived by the São Paulo Municipality City Hall, was designed by engineers of the "Enescil Engenharia e Projetos Ltda". The preliminary design called for two separate cable-stayed bridges, each suspending a curved roadway from its mast (pylon) inclined outwardly from the axis of curvature to provide balance and minimum torsion on its mast. More importantly, the two oppositely curved roadways crossed over each other. The critical step in the engineering design was to make the crossover of the two roadways occur vertically below both inclined masts, which led to the two oppositely inclined masts intersecting, bracing each other, forming a single "X"-shaped tower as the central support of the bridge. After the engineering design was established, "Valente e Valente Arquitetos" softened the contours and provided the finishing touches of the work.

In 2005, construction began under the company "Construtora OAS Ltda". After three years of construction, the bridge was inaugurated on 10 May 2008. The total cost, including illumination, came to R$233 million.

== Details ==
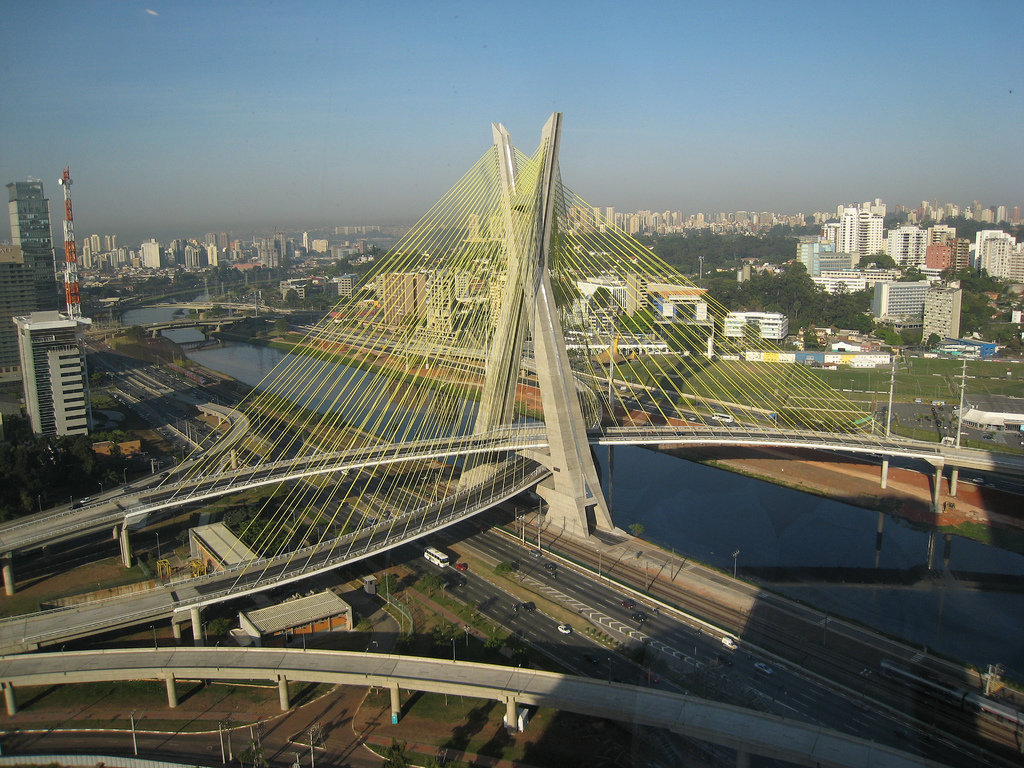
Looking south-southwest: Octavio Frias de Oliveira Bridge carrying two oppositely curved roadways

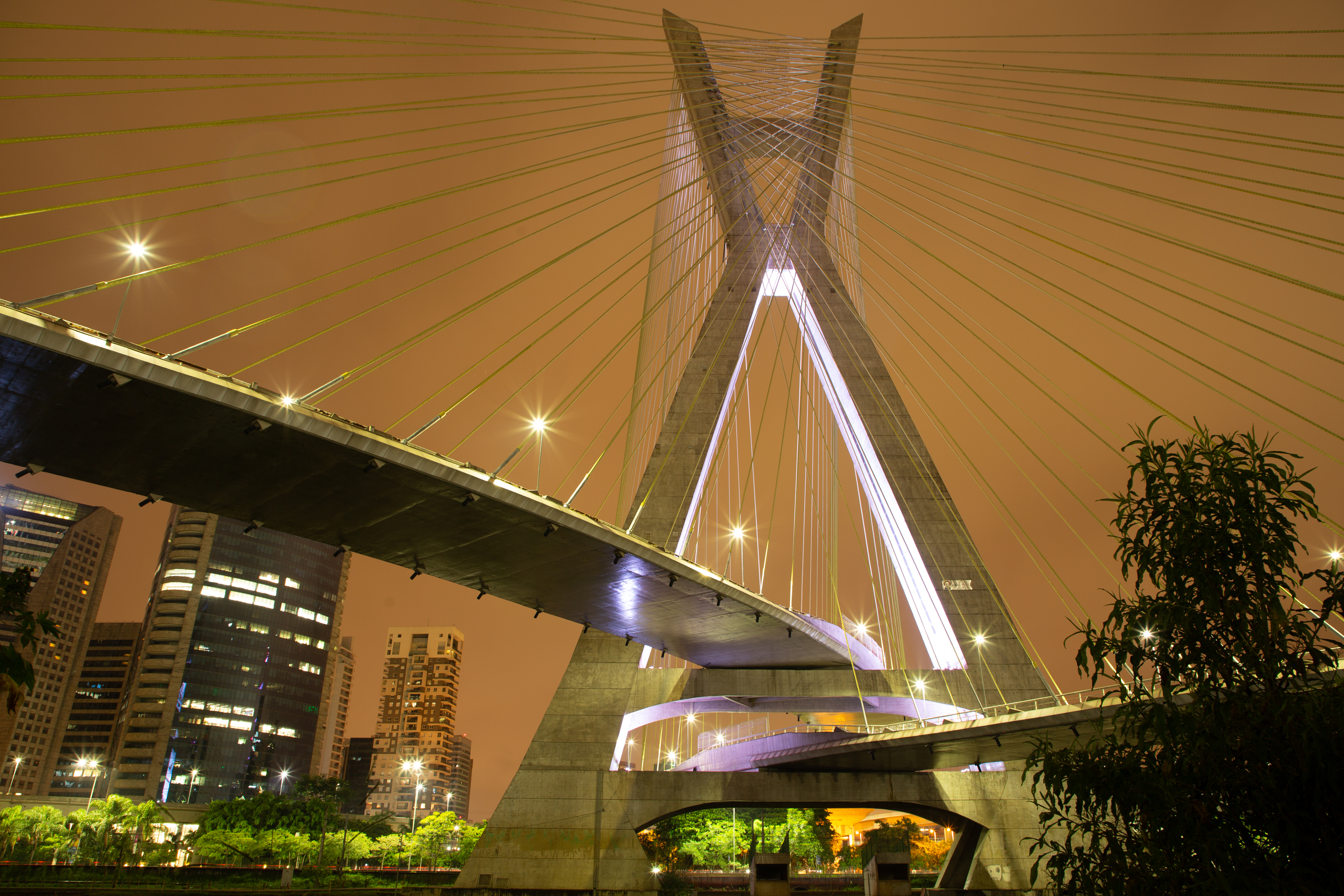
Looking east: Octávio Frias de Oliveira Bridge stay cables crisscrossing on the Pinheiros River side

The "X"-shaped tower is anchored onto the east bank of the Pinheiros River at the end of the Jornalista Roberto Marinho Avenue; it is 138 meters high, 76 meters wide at its base and 35.4 meters wide at the top. The cable-stayed bridge deck is unique due to its complex form: two curved roadways with constant radius of 275.1 meters, oppositely curved, crossing over near the base of the tower, one at an elevation of 12 meters and the other at an elevation of 24 meters, each supported by a strut between the two legs of the X-shaped tower. Both roadways have cable-stayed spans of 140 meters on the Roberto Marinho Avenue side and 150 meters on the Marginal Pinheiros side, for a total of four cable-stayed spans. The curved edge beams of each cable-stayed span are connected to its outwardly inclined arm of the X-shaped tower by 18 pairs of stay cables, for a total of 144 stay cables. On the curved cable-stayed spans over the Pinheiros River, the stay cables are interlaced, creating a crisscrossing geometric arrangement not found in any other cable-stayed bridge in the world.

At the end of December, lights are put up on the cables and illuminated to create color effects like those on a Christmas tree. The bridge is also lit up on special occasions during the year and is often used for automobile advertisements on television.

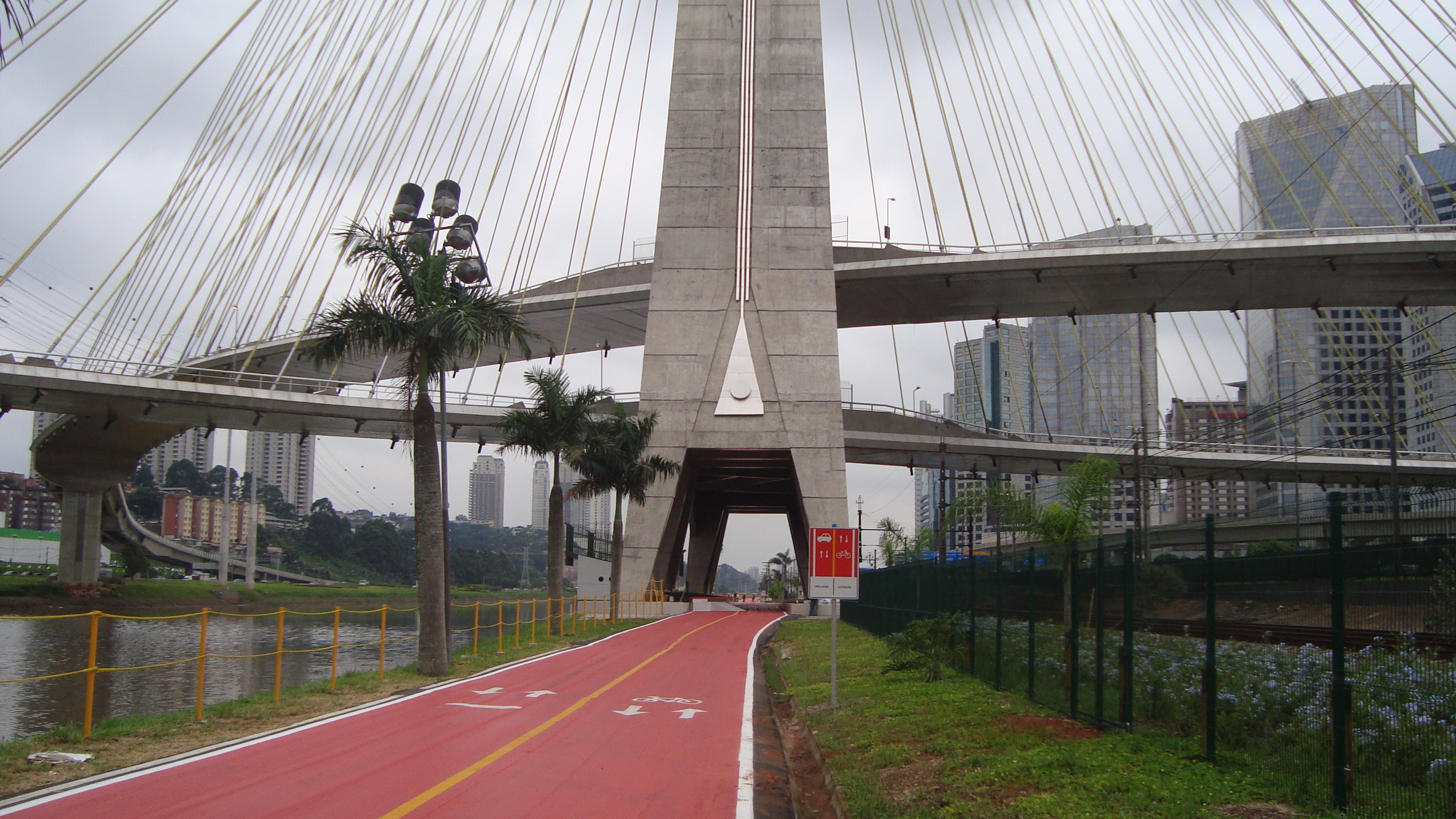
East bank of Pinheiros River looking north: bicycle path through the tower base of Otávio Frias de Oliveira Bridge

Although the Bridge is a well-known sight, it takes intentional effort to see it up close because only motor vehicles are allowed on it. To drive through one of the two cable-stayed curved roadways of the Bridge, one needs either to be westbound on Roberto Marinho Avenue and head southbound on Marginal Pinheiros or to be southbound on Marginal Pinheiros and head eastbound on Roberto Marinho Avenue. Alternatively, the Bridge area by the River can be accessed by bicycle or by foot, although the Pinheiros River is polluted.

The bridge has been attacked by vandals on several occasions. In 2011, thieves stole 6 kilometres (3.7 mi) of wire, worth R$200,000 (US$117,000). Later in August, vandals broke in the bridge's control room and destroyed the panels. On January 9, 2012, vandals stole 94 of the 142 searchlights of the bridge. It will take 90 days and R$1,000,000 (around US$250,000) to completely re-establish the lighting system.

== See also ==
- Franco-Brazilian Binational Bridge, cable-stayed bridge between French Guiana and Brazil
- Newton Navarro Bridge, cable-stayed bridge in the city of Natal, Brazil
- Ponte do Saber, cable-stayed bridge in the city of Rio de Janeiro, Brazil
- Rio Negro Bridge, cable-stayed bridge in state of Amazonas, Brazil
- Wilson Pinheiro Binational Bridge, cable-stayed bridge between Bolivia and Brazil
