= Fasano Group =

Hotel and restaurant chain in Brazil

- Native name: Grupo Fasano
- Industry: Hospitality
- Founded: January 1, 1902; 124 years ago in Sao Paulo, Brazil
- Founder: Vittorio Fasano
- Area served: Brazil, Uruguay, United States
- Key people: Gero Fasano (Chair)
- Products: Hotels, restaurants, food
- Owner: Gero Fasano (37%); JHSF Participações
- Number of employees: 1,500+ (2023)
- Website: fasano.com.br

Fasano Group (Portuguese pronunciation: [ɡ ʁupo fɐsɐno] officially Restaurante Fasano Ltda.) is a Brazilian multinational hospitality company based in Jardins, São Paulo, Brazil. Founded by the Fasano family in 1902, it operates hotels and restaurants in Brazil, Uruguay and the United States. Gero Fasano remains the controlling shareholder with 37% and chairman of the group. As of 2023, Fasano operates 26 restaurants, nine hotels and employs 1,500+ people worldwide.

== History ==
In 1902, Italian immigrant Vittorio Fasano opened Brasserie Paulista, a restaurant on Avenida Paulista. The name later shifted into Restaurante Fasano (Fasano Restaurant) and was operating successfully until the 1930s. The Fasano family subsequently expanded the business to additional restaurants and an Italian bakery.

In the 1980s, Gero Fasano dropped out of the University of the Arts London, returned to his native country and took over the family business. He transformed the regionally organized restaurants company into a multinational luxury hospitality brand.

In 2014, Brazilian real estate development company JHSF agreed to buy 13 Fasano restaurant locations as well as the right to use the brand, for 53 million Brazilians reais ($23.8m). Ever since the previous owner Gero Fasano remains a controlling shareholder with 37% and currently still chairs the company.

Upcoming locations have been confirmed to be open in Sardegna, Cascais, London, Miami, La Barra and Milan.

== Operations ==
Fasano group operates the following hotels:

- Fasano Fifth Avenue, New York City (private residence club)
- Fasano Punta del Este, Punta del Este, Uruguay
- Fasano São Paulo Itaim, Sao Paulo, Itaim Paulista
- Fasano Trancoso Trancoso, Bahia
- Fasano Belo Horizonte Belo Horizonte
- Fasano Salvador Salvador, Bahia
- Fasano Angra dos Reis Angra dos Reis
- Fasano Rio de Janeiro Rio de Janeiro
- Fasano Boa Vista Porto Feliz, São Paulo
- Fasano Sao Paulo Jardins Jardins
