= Colégio Bandeirantes de São Paulo =

Private school in São Paulo

Colégio Bandeirantes
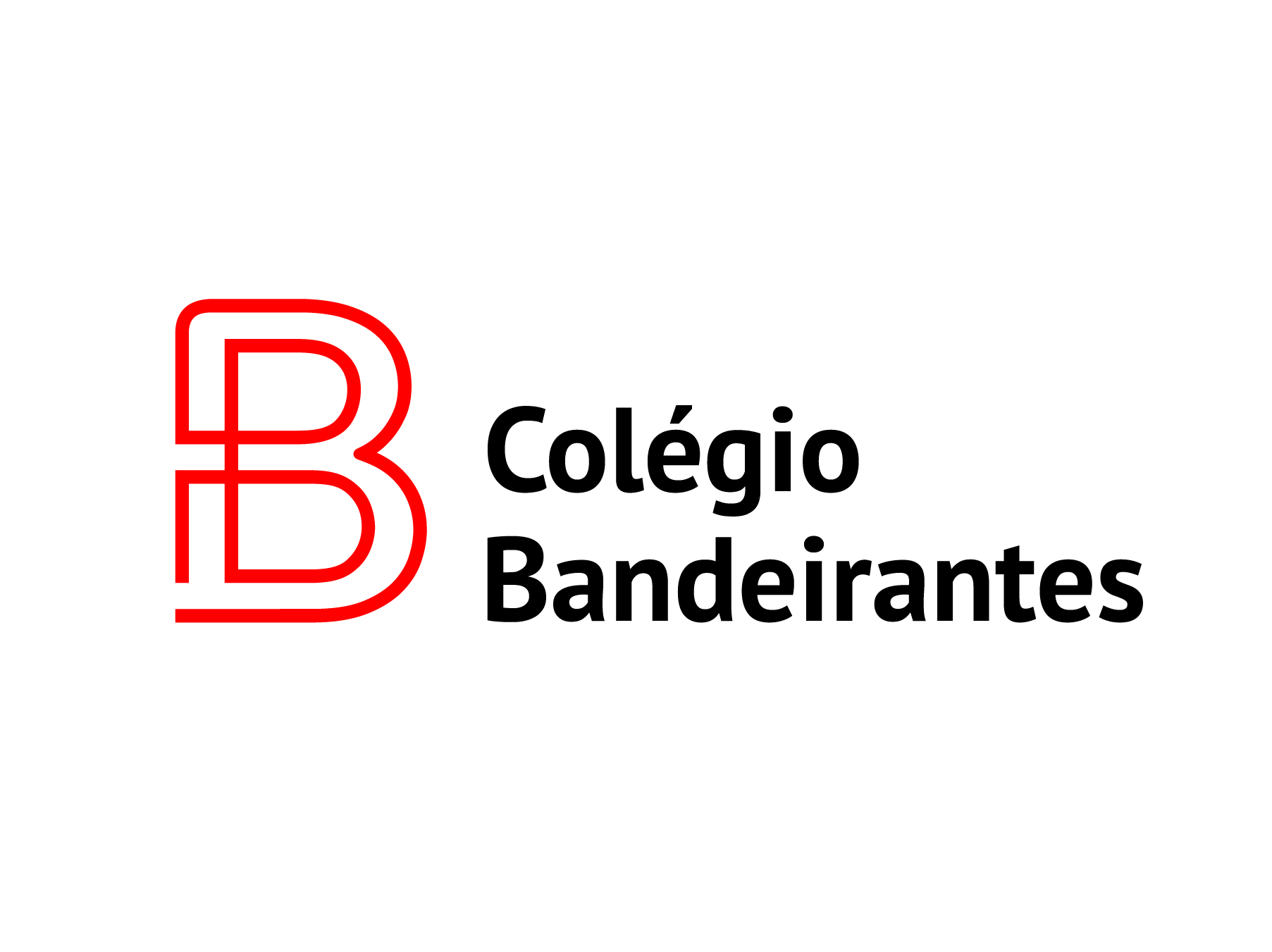
- Colégio Bandeirantes in 1940

Location
- Rua Estela, 268 - Vila Mariana, São Paulo, SP, 04011-001, Brasil; 23°34′40.20″S 46°38′36.60″W

Information
- Established: 1 March 1934; 92 years ago
- Director: Mauro de Salles Aguiar
- Campus Director: Eduardo Tambor Júnior
- Website: https://colband.net.br

Colégio Bandeirantes, known as "Band", is a school in São Paulo, founded in 1934. It offers education from Early Childhood Education to High School.

== History ==
It was founded on 1 March 1934 as Ginásio Bandeirantes, with headquarters at Rua Estela, 268. In 1944, educator and engineer Antônio de Carvalho Aguiar acquired the institution and renamed it Colégio Bandeirantes. At the time, Aguiar was also President Director of Colégio Liceu Panamericano. The name of Antônio de Carvalho Aguiar is currently honoured with the naming of a viaduct on Rua Cubatão, over Avenida 23 de Maio.

In 1989, it was the first school in Brazil to organize debates with candidates for the Presidency of the Republic, mediated by journalists renowned as André Singer. In 2016, the college also held debates with the main candidates for São Paulo City Hall, broadcast live on the institution's social networks.

In 1967, the school's land was expropriated due to the construction of Avenida 23 de Maio, resulting in the need to adapt the facilities. In 1973, Block A and the Gymnasium were completed, marking an important expansion of the infrastructure.

During the 1980s, it introduced computer language teaching, anticipating the growing importance of technology. In the 1990s, the school underwent an update with the adoption of a new visual identity and redesign of its logo.

In 2015, Band implemented new strategic planning and incorporated the STEAM (Science, Technology, Engineering, Arts, and Mathematics) project into its curriculum. Construction of the new Tower began in 2020, after years of planning. After two years, the Tower was completed in 2022.

In 2023, the school began operating Elementary School I with the inauguration of the new Tower, marking an important step forward in its expansion and modernisation. Throughout its history, Colégio Bandeirantes has trained around 50 thousand students since its foundation.

== International approvals ==
Colégio Bandeirantes has a team of advisors specialised in admission processes to international universities. In recent years, the institution has registered several acceptances at universities outside Brazil.

Students from the college have been accepted into several renowned international universities, including Harvard, Stanford, Yale, Princeton, University of Pennsylvania, Columbia, University of Chicago, Duke, Brown, Cornell, Johns Hopkins, University of British Columbia, University of Toronto, Bocconi University, IE University, University of Porto, University of Coimbra, University of Lisbon, NYU Abu Dhabi, among others.

The support offered by the school's International Department includes guidance throughout the students' academic career, with a focus on increasing the competitiveness of profiles for selective universities, support in choosing institutions and the application process, as well as preparing documentation in English. The college also organises visits from foreign universities to the campus and holds workshops and preparatory classes for the SAT.

== Aid programs and scholarships ==
Colégio Bandeirantes participates in several initiatives to promote education for low-income young people, in collaboration with non-governmental organisations (NGOs). Partnerships include the Social Institute to Motivate, Support and Recognise Talents (Ismart), Instituto Sol and Associação Alcance, which have already benefited around 400 young people.

The Ismart Institute is a private, non-profit entity that seeks to enhance the talent of young Brazilians, promoting access to excellent education for development in their future areas of activity. Instituto Sol offers full scholarships to public school students during high school, as well as support with food, transportation, school supplies and health care. Associação Alcance provides education and mentoring to low-income students with high motivation, helping them reach their academic and personal potential.

== Controversies ==
=== 2018 suicides ===
In 2018, two high school students committed suicide within twelve days. The first case occurred on April 10 and the second on April 22, both outside the school environment. After the first suicide, Colégio Bandeirantes hired a psychologist specialised in suicide prevention and implemented psychological support activities for students. With the second suicide, the school administration reinforced these actions. Classes for third-year high school students were suspended on April 23 and 24 to allow for reflection and psychological support activities. Furthermore, spaces for dialogue and welcome were created for the entire school community.

=== 2024 suicide ===
On August 12, 2024, Pedro, a 9th-grade student at elementary school, committed suicide at the age of 14 after suffering bullying, racism and homophobia from fellow students. The school's press office confirmed the death and reported that the incident occurred outside the school premises. The institution declared that it was “deeply shaken” and that its “priority is to offer all the necessary support and assistance to the student’s family and colleagues and friends impacted by this tragedy.”

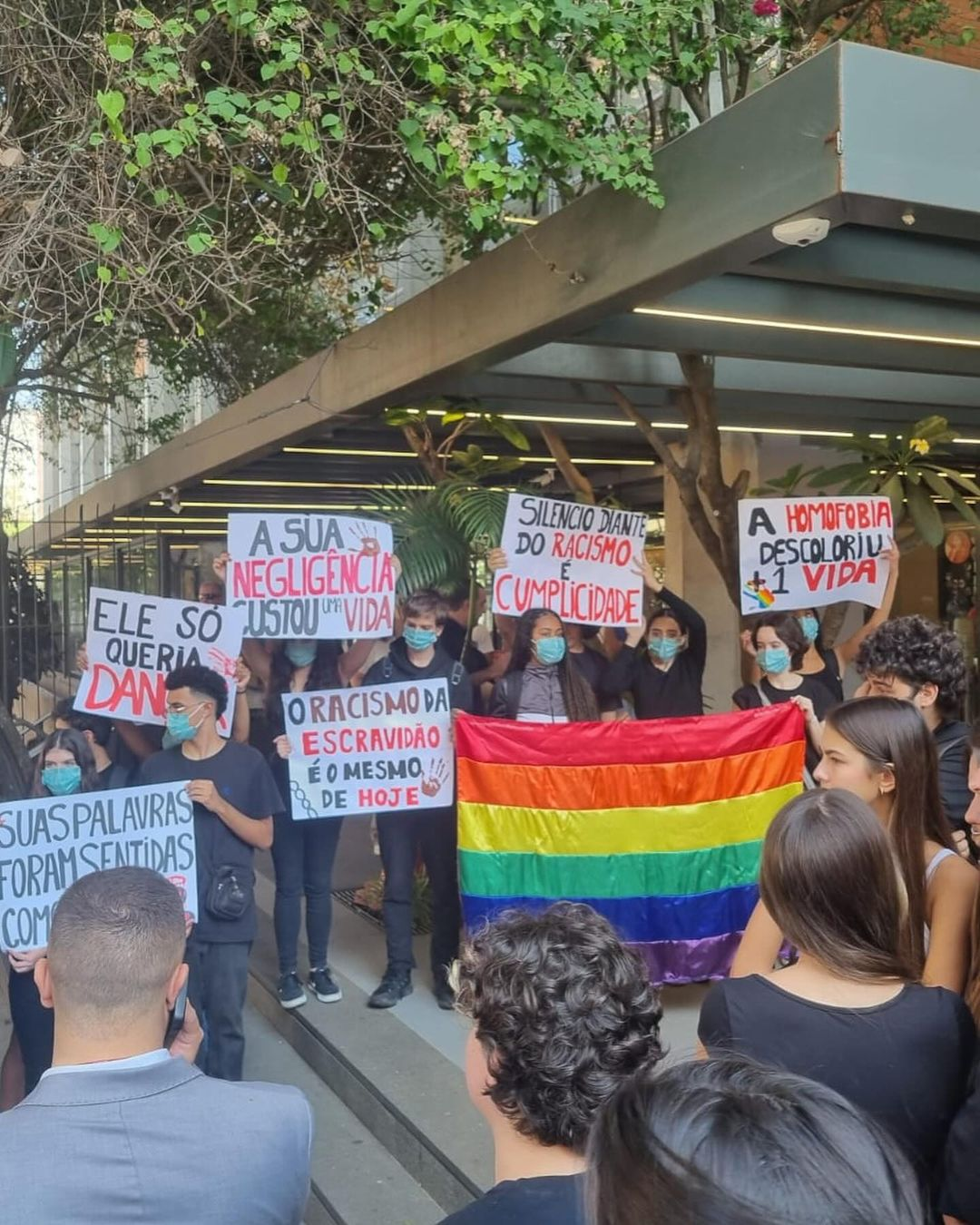
Image of the demonstration, in front of Colégio Bandeirantes, 1 week after a case of suicide

The school's response was widely criticised by Bruno de Paula, Pedro's uncle. He alleged that the school demonstrated negligence by limiting its communication to the delivery of a wreath and a note of condolence, without offering direct support to the family. On his social networks, Bruno expressed his indignation: “Pedro couldn’t stand the ‘jokes’ and racism from his colleagues and succumbed to bullying and homophobia. We lost Pedro to the school’s neglect.” He questioned the institution's lack of effective action, stating: “What action will the college take to prevent other Pedros from leaving us in such a tragic way?” The response from Colégio Bandeirantes, which highlighted the occurrence of the incident outside the school and reaffirmed its commitment to student support programs, was considered insufficient by many. The school mentioned the existence of initiatives such as the “Help Teams” and the “Rational and Emotional Support Committee,” but did not detail specific measures adopted in response to Pedro's case.

Public outrage led to a protest in front of the school, carried out by around 60 young people, which took place on the morning of Monday, August 19, 2024. It was organised by students from several schools in São Paulo, including students from Colégio Bandeirantes, who highlighted the urgent need for action against bullying and homophobia, in addition to demanding a clear position from the school management. Protesters drew attention to the situation and called for more effective measures to prevent similar cases in the future.
