= Gero Fasano =

Brazilian businessman

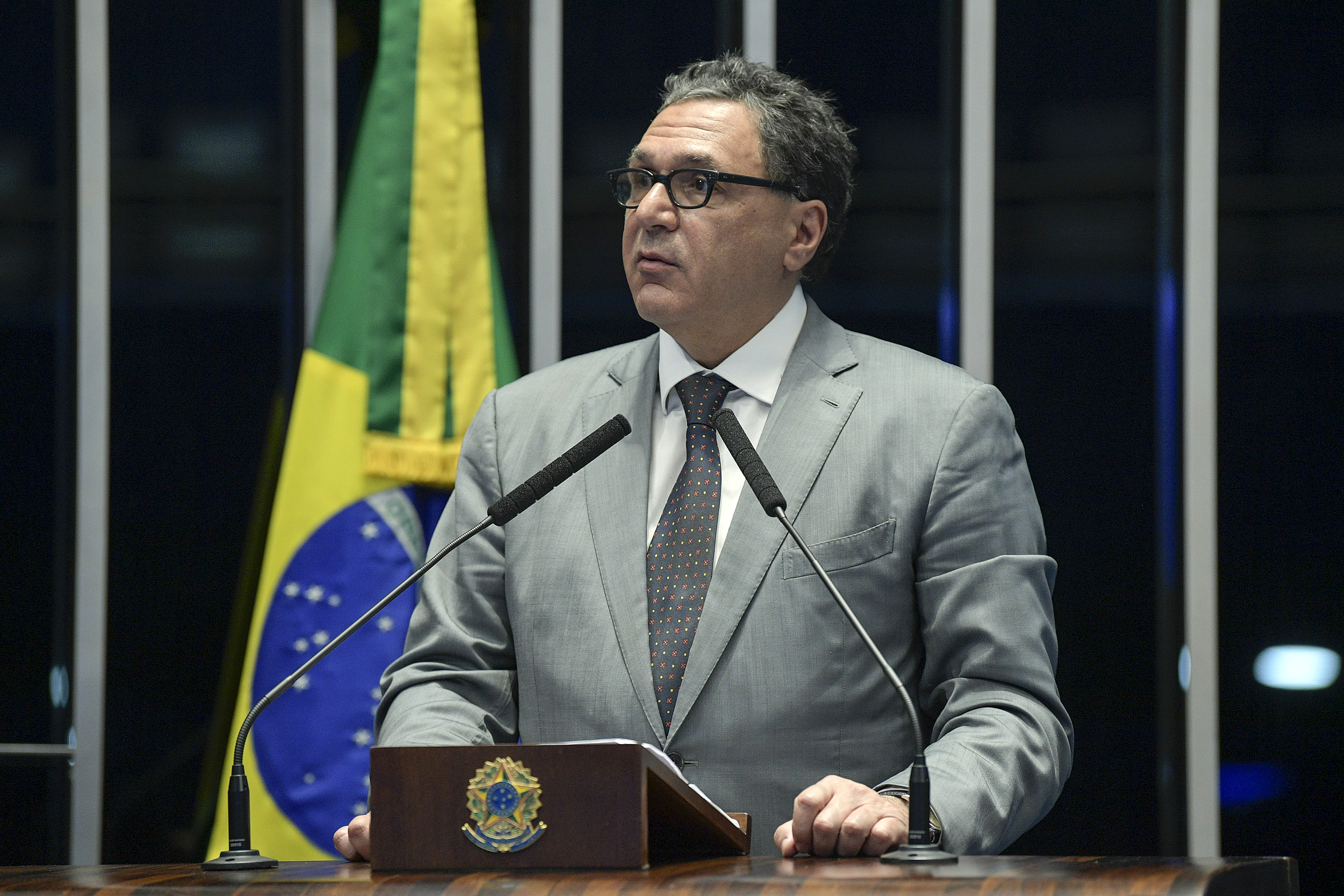
- Fasano in 2018 at the Federal Senate
- Born: Rogério Marco Fasano; 19 April 1962 (age 64); Bela Vista, São Paulo, Brazil
- Education: Colégio Dante Alighieri; University of the Arts London (dropped out)
- Occupations: Businessman, hospitality leader
- Known for: Founding and leading Fasano Group
- Children: 2

Gero Fasano (/fɑːsɑːnɒ/; né Rogério Marco Fasano; born 19 April 1962) is a Brazilian businessman, hospitality entrepreneur and minority owner of Fasano Group. In 2009, he was considered to be among the 100 most influential Brazilians by Época Magazine. In 2022, he became primarily known in the United States for opening two new ventures in New York City, which included Fasano Fifth Avenue, a private residence hospitality operation on Fifth Avenue and Fasano Restaurant in Midtown East.

== Early life and education ==
Fasano was born on 19 April 1962, in Bela Vista, an Italian district of São Paulo, Brazil. He was one of three children born to Fabrizio Fasano and Daisy Apparecida Salles Fasano. His paternal lineage is of Milanese descent and he still retains Brazilian-Italian dual citizenship. Fasano's great-great-grandfather opened the first Fasano Restaurant in 1902. He has two siblings, one brother and one sister.

He was educated at Colégio Dante Alighieri, a public high school recognized by the Italian Ministry of Education. He then studied film at the University of the Arts London before dropping out and entering the family business.

== Career ==
Fasano started his career at the Fasano hospitality business, which back then included only one restaurant on Avenida Paulista in São Paulo, after he dropped out of college. The restaurant legacy was started in 1902 by Vittorio Fasano. An Italian emigrant from Milan and the patriarch of the family who arrived in Brazil in 1890. After Vittorio's death, his youngest son, Ruggero, would resume the family's gastronomic legacy, reopening Fasano on Rua Vieira de Carvalho, also in the city center. The businesses which included a confectionary shop by then became one of the most sought after addresses in São Paulo, an obligatory place for the high society afternoon tea ritual. In 1982, Fabrizio Fasano, son of Ruggero, an executive with a background in business administration in the United States and former owner of a beverage industry, summoned Gero, his fourth-generation son, to open a new restaurant in Shopping Eldorado.

The Fasano Group comprises 26 restaurants, 9 hotels and employs over 1,500 people worldwide. Gero works as president of the Group and has a 37% stake in the business, having sold part of the company to JHSF Participações.

== Personal life ==
In 1992, Fasano married the journalist Kiki Romero, with whom he has one daughter. Since 2004, he is married to Ana Luiza de Aguirre Joma Fasano. With her he has a son, Vittorio Fasano (born 2006), who is currently attending Fordham University. In 2021, he officially changed his name to his former nickname Gero Fasano.
