= JHSF Participações =

Real estate holding company

- Type: Public
- Traded as: B3: JHSF3
- Industry: Real estate and recurring income
- Founded: 1972
- Founder: Fábio Auriemo
- Headquarters: São Paulo, Brazil
- Areas served: Brazil, Uruguay, US. Italy
- Key people: José Auriemo Neto (chairman of the board) and Augusto Martins (CEO)
- Products: Real estate development, residential, commercial, shopping centers, hotels, restaurants, airport, clubs, financial
- Revenue: R$ 1.549 million (in 2025)
- Net income: ▲ R$ 890 million (in 2025)
- Total assets: R$ 15 billion (in 2024)
- Number of employees: 4.757 (in 2025)
- Website: jhsf.com.br/en/

JHSF Participações is a Brazilian real estate holding company, investing in the high-income segment with a focus on recurrent income assets. It is known as the first company in Brazil to prioritize recurrent income assets, including shopping malls, airports, hotels and other real estate projects. The company operates in the Brazilian market, as well as in other countries, such as the United States and Uruguay. In 2023, the company had a market value of approximately R$2.7 billion.

== History ==
The company was founded under the name JHS in São Paulo, Brazil in 1972 by brothers Fábio and José Roberto Auriemo and two other partners. The company focused on construction and real estate development at its inception. By 1990, JHS had split into two companies with Fábio Auriemo taking control of real estate market operations (JHSF Participações), and José Roberto Auriemo heading the other company (JHSJ).

In 2001, JHSF Participações expanded its business into the shopping center segment. The company developed the Shopping Metrô Santa Cruz in São Paulo, Brazil, which was the first mall in the country to have a subway station.

The company also became the majority shareholder of Fasano Group's hotels at that time.

In 2007, the company registered its IPO and began publicly trading. At the end of the same year, JHSF inaugurated the Fazenda Boa Vista development, a summer residential condominium with 12 million square meters, in the municipality of Porto Feliz, in São Paulo.

JHSF negotiated for Shopping Metrô Santa Cruz to be to sold to BR Malls in 2010. By 2016, Hemisfério Sul Investimentos Group had concluded the purchase of Shopping Metrô Tucuruvi. In 2014, JHSF inaugurated Catarina Fashion Outlet, the first outlet in Brazil in the luxury market. The mall is part of a project that includes São Paulo Catarina Executive Airport, the first private airport for executive aviation in the country. In the same year, Vice President Eduardo Camara took over as CEO and José Auriemo Neto became its chairman of the board of directors.

Camara remained in the position until February 2018, when he was replaced by Thiago Alonso de Oliveira, who remained in the position until the beginning of 2024. Augusto Martins took over as CEO of the company in February this year.

By 2017, JHSF had developed more than 6 million square meters of real estate projects.

== Projects ==
JHSF launched the Cidade Jardim complex in 2006, which includes the Shopping Cidade Jardim. In addition to the shopping mall, the complex consists of nine residential towers that are part of the high-end condominium Parque Cidade Jardim, and three commercial towers that make up the Cidade Jardim Corporate Center.

In 2018, JHSF launched its second expansion of the Catarina Fashion Outlet, making it the largest outlet branch in the country. The same year, the sale of five minority stakes in XP Malls assets was closed, with an approximate value of R$650 million.

In December 2019, JHSF opened São Paulo Catarina Executive Airport, Brazil's first private airport, dedicated to executive flights. Located in the city of São Roque, in the interior of São Paulo, the project has a capacity for 200 thousand landings and takeoffs per year, and was built in an area of 5.2 million square meters. The airport is part of the Catarina Integrated Urban Development, which also includes Shopping Catarina Fashion Outlet and the Catarina Corporate Center. The Fasano Cidade Jardim development was also launched in 2019, featuring residential units, a hotel, and club.

The Boa Vista Village, an expansion of the Boa Vista Complex, was also launched in 2019. The expansion includes the first PerfectSwell wave pool in Latin America, with technology that generates waves for up to 22 seconds.

JHSF opened Shops Jardins, a mall integrated into Hotel Fasano, in 2020. The project is a partnership between JHSF and XP Malls Fundo de Investimentos Imobiliarios. Shops Jardim houses the first Isabel Marant and Inès de La Fressange shops in Brazil, as well as the first men's Balmain globally.

In 2021, the executive airport received approval to operate international flights. Also in 2021, Boa Vista Estates, the third development in the Boa Vista Complex, completed its launch. At the end of the year, JHSF acquired 67% of Usina São Paulo, one of the main governmental de-pollution projects for São Paulo's Pinheiros River.

In 2023, Boa Vista Village opened in Porto Feliz. The development features Surf Lodge Residences, the Boa Vista Village Surf Club, a spa, and surf pool with beach access.

=== International ===
JHSF Internacional has developed projects in the United States and Uruguay. The company's most notable buildings are 815 on Fifth Avenue in New York City and the real estate development of the residential condominium Las Piedras in Punta del Este, Uruguay.

In 2021, JHSF opened the Fasano Fifth Avenue in New York City. In 2022, Fasano Fifth Avenue made the list of 8 Best Hotels in New York by Vogue America.

Focusing on its international expansion, JHSF also acquired an art deco building in Miami Beach in 2022. JHSF plans to open Fasano Miami in 2024.

== Managed enterprises ==
- Parque Cidade Jardim - São Paulo
- Fazenda Boa Vista – Porto Feliz
- Boa Vista Village – Porto Feliz
- Shopping Cidade Jardim – São Paulo
- Catarina Fashion Outlet – São Roque
- Fasano group hotels & restaurants
- Shops Jardins – São Paulo
- Faria Lima Shops
- São Paulo Catarina Executive International Airport
- Retail: Emilio Pucci, Aquazzura, Brunello Cucinelli, Balmain, Celine
