= São Paulo Catarina Executive Airport =

São Paulo Catarina International Executive Airport São Paulo Catarina Aeroporto Executivo Internacional
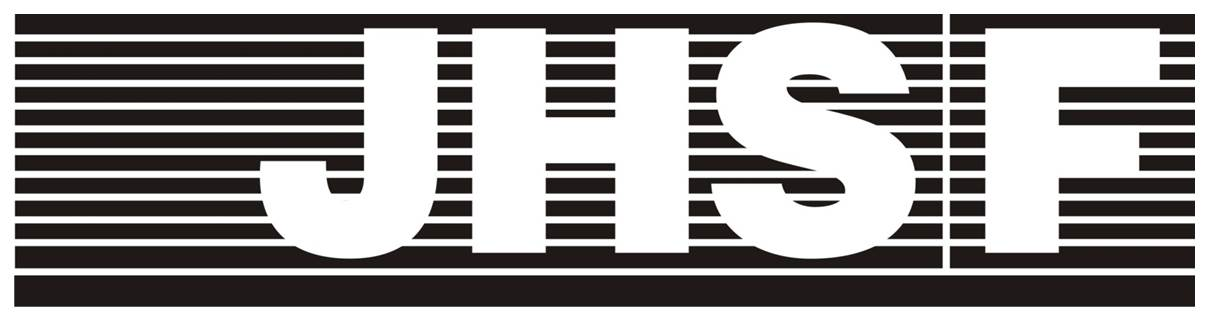
- IATA: JHF; ICAO: SBJH; LID: SP1176

Summary
- Airport type: Public
- Owner/Operator: JHSF Participações
- Serves: São Paulo
- Location: São Roque, Brazil
- Opened: December 16, 2019
- Time zone: BRT (UTC−03:00)
- Elevation AMSL: 777 m / 2,549 ft
- Coordinates: 23°25′37″S 047°09′57″W
- Website: www.catarinajhsf.com.br/aeroporto

Map
- Location in Brazil JHF (Brazil)

Runways
Direction	Length		Surface
Direction	m	ft	Surface
12/30	2,470	8,104	Asphalt
- Sources: Airport Website, ANAC, DECEA

São Paulo Catarina International Executive Airport (IATA: JHF, ICAO: SBJH), is a general aviation airport serving São Paulo Metropolitan Area, Brazil.

It is owned and operated by JHSF Participações.

== History ==
The airport is dedicated to general aviation. It was commissioned on December 16, 2019.

On June 24, 2021 the airport was granted international status.

== Airlines and destinations ==
No scheduled flights operate at this airport.

== Access ==
The airport is located 27 km (17 mi) from downtown São Roque and 74 km (46 mi) from downtown São Paulo.

== See also ==
- List of airports in Brazil
