= Engenheiro Luís Carlos Berrini Avenue =

Avenue in São Paulo

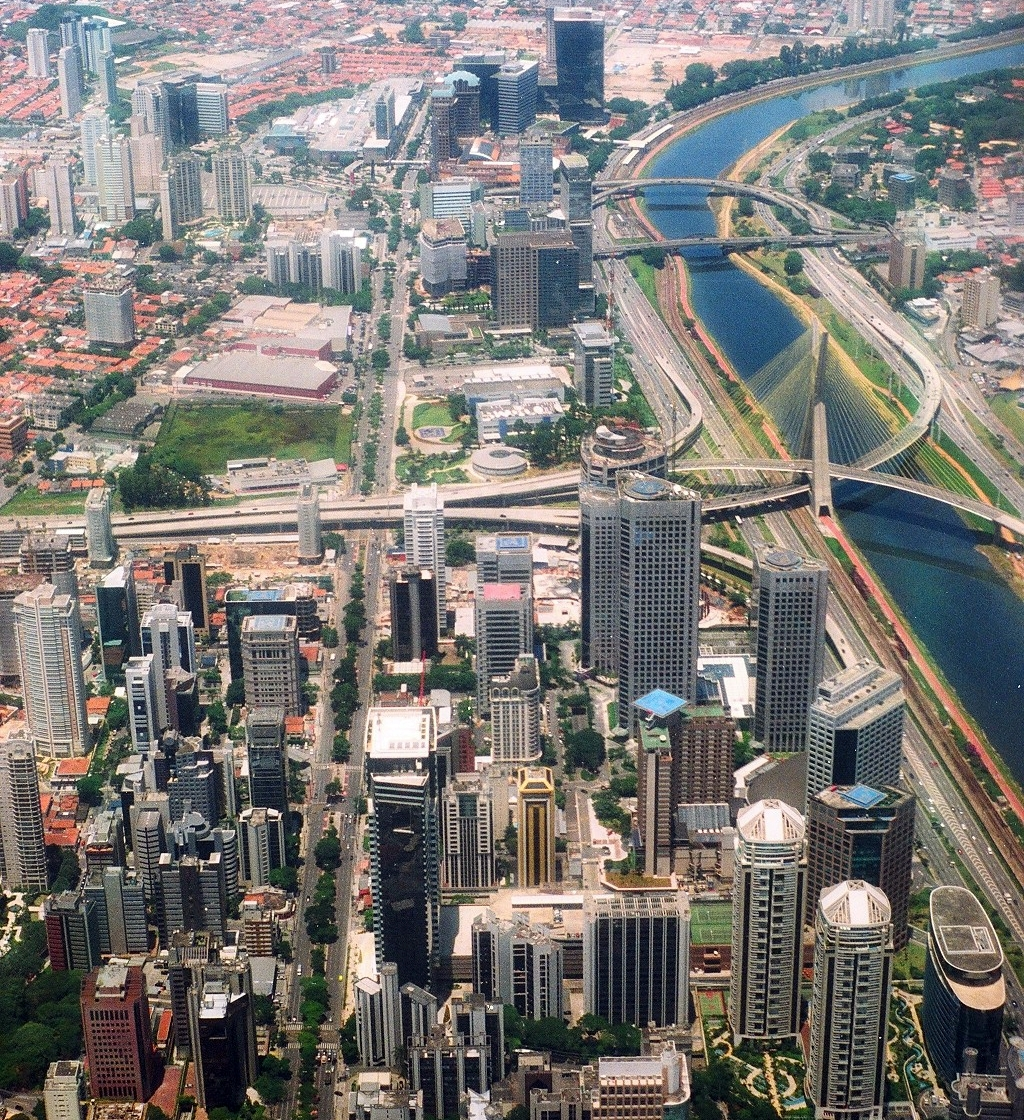
- Aerial view of Engenheiro Luís Carlos Berrini Avenue
- Interactive map of Engenheiro Luís Carlos Berrini Avenue
- Native name: Avenida Engenheiro Luís Carlos Berrini (Portuguese)
- Length: 1,870 m (6,140 ft)
- Location: São Paulo, Brazil
- Coordinates: 23°36′18″S 46°41′34″W
- North end: Rua Funchal
- South end: Avenida Doutor Chucri Zaidan

The Engenheiro Luís Carlos Berrini Avenue (in Portuguese: Avenida Engenheiro Luís Carlos Berrini) is an important arterial route in the city of São Paulo, which concentrates in its extent and nearby offices of companies linked to advanced service providers. The boulevard is part of the city area known as "West Zone of São Paulo", an area of economic expansion that follows the trajectory of the city throughout the twentieth century. The construction of the avenue, however, occurred only in the 1970s and was accompanied by controversy, having been considered by some urban planning scholars as a "social disaster", because the arrival of large companies drove out the low-income people who lived there.

The highway is called Funchal Street in the section before the Engineer Ari Torres Bridge and Doctor Chucri Zaidan Avenue in the stretch after the José Bonifácio Coutinho Nogueira Viaduct.

== Location ==
The avenue is located in West Zone of São Paulo, in the Brooklin Novo neighborhood.
