= 23 de Maio Avenue =

Avenue in São Paulo

- Itororó Avenue; Anhangabaú Avenue
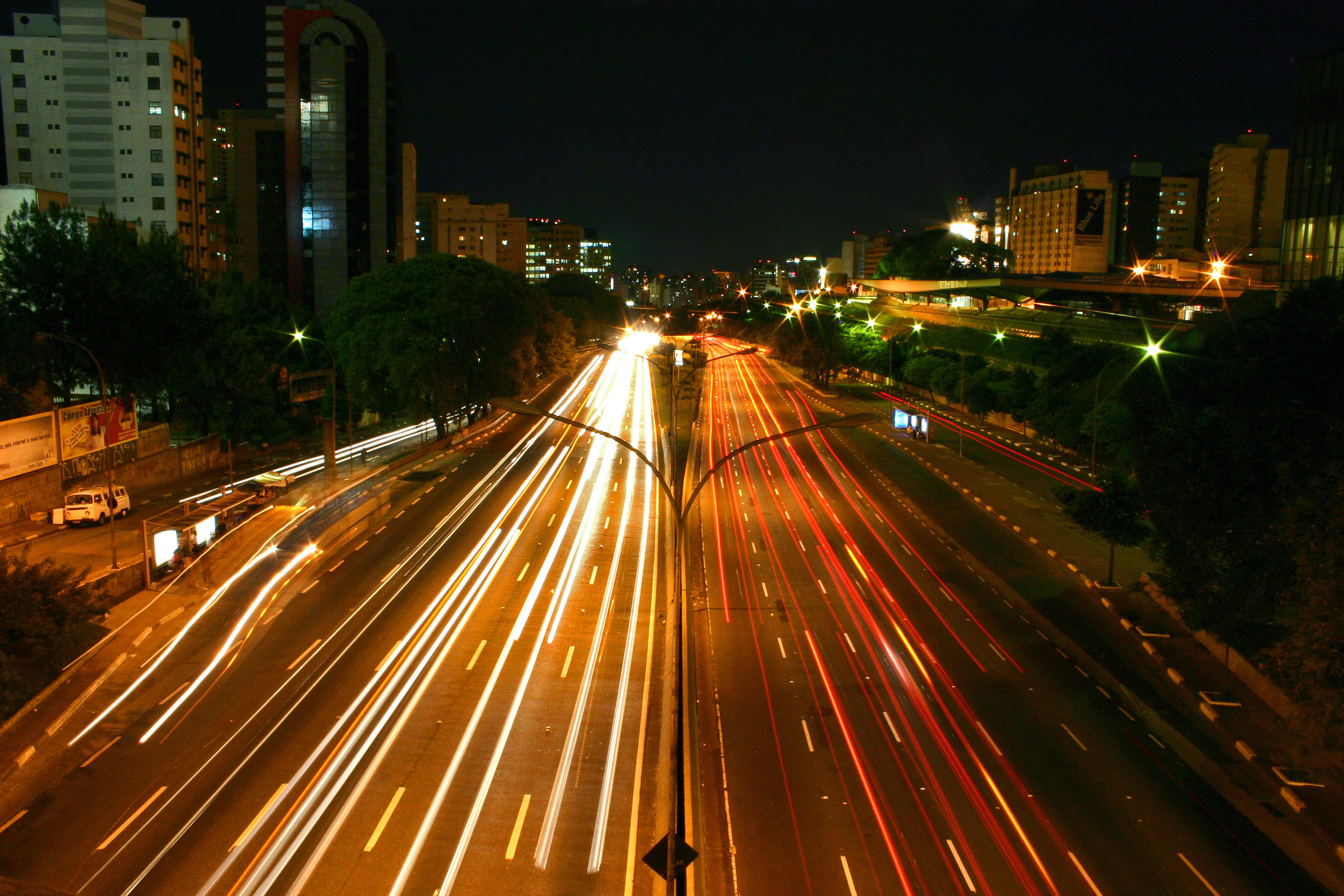
- 23 de Maio Avenue at night.
- Length: 3220 m
- Location: São Paulo, Brazil

23 de Maio Avenue (Portuguese: Avenida 23 de Maio), also known as Itororó Avenue (Avenida Itororó) or Anhangabaú Avenue (Avenida Anhangabaú), is located in the Brazilian city of São Paulo. It is the main route connecting the neighborhoods of the Vila Mariana subprefecture to the central region of the city and belongs to the North-South Corridor. It was named after the students Martins, Miragaia, Dráusio and Camargo, who died on May 23, 1932, during the Constitutionalist Revolution of 1932.

== History ==
=== Project ===
In 1927, former Mayor José Pires do Rio commissioned a road system from a group of urban planners, who suggested the "valley floor theory", which involved the creation of a network of avenues and radial and perimeter roads that would orient and structure the urban growth of the city of São Paulo using valley floor and lowland areas, composed of wetlands and areas of low real estate value. Until then, the city favored long avenues, such as Paulista, Doutor Arnaldo and Lins de Vasconcelos. In the same year, one of the pavilions of the Taco de Ouro Factory on Pedroso Street was expropriated for the upcoming construction work. The remains of the warehouse remained abandoned for many years due to the delay in starting work.

The project for the avenue dates from 1937; in 1940, it already featured on the Guia Levi maps. The original project only envisaged a connection between the city center and Ibirapuera Park; in 1958, it was included in the Urban Diametral Expressway Plan under the name 23 de Maio Avenue, established by Ordinary Law number 4,473 of May 22, 1954.

The original project included widened central medians for a future metro line, wider lanes, less steep ramps and the creation of a "green belt" eighteen meters wide on each side of the lanes. At the time, the capacity of the avenue was expected to be around 4,000 vehicles per hour in each direction.

=== Construction ===
Work began in 1951 on the 200-meter stretch between Bandeira Square and the Dona Paulina Viaduct, which was used for many years as a parking lot as it had no exit. By 1961, the plan was to include Assembleia Street, as the costs of expropriating properties beyond that point exceeded the budget for the project that year by 1,900%.

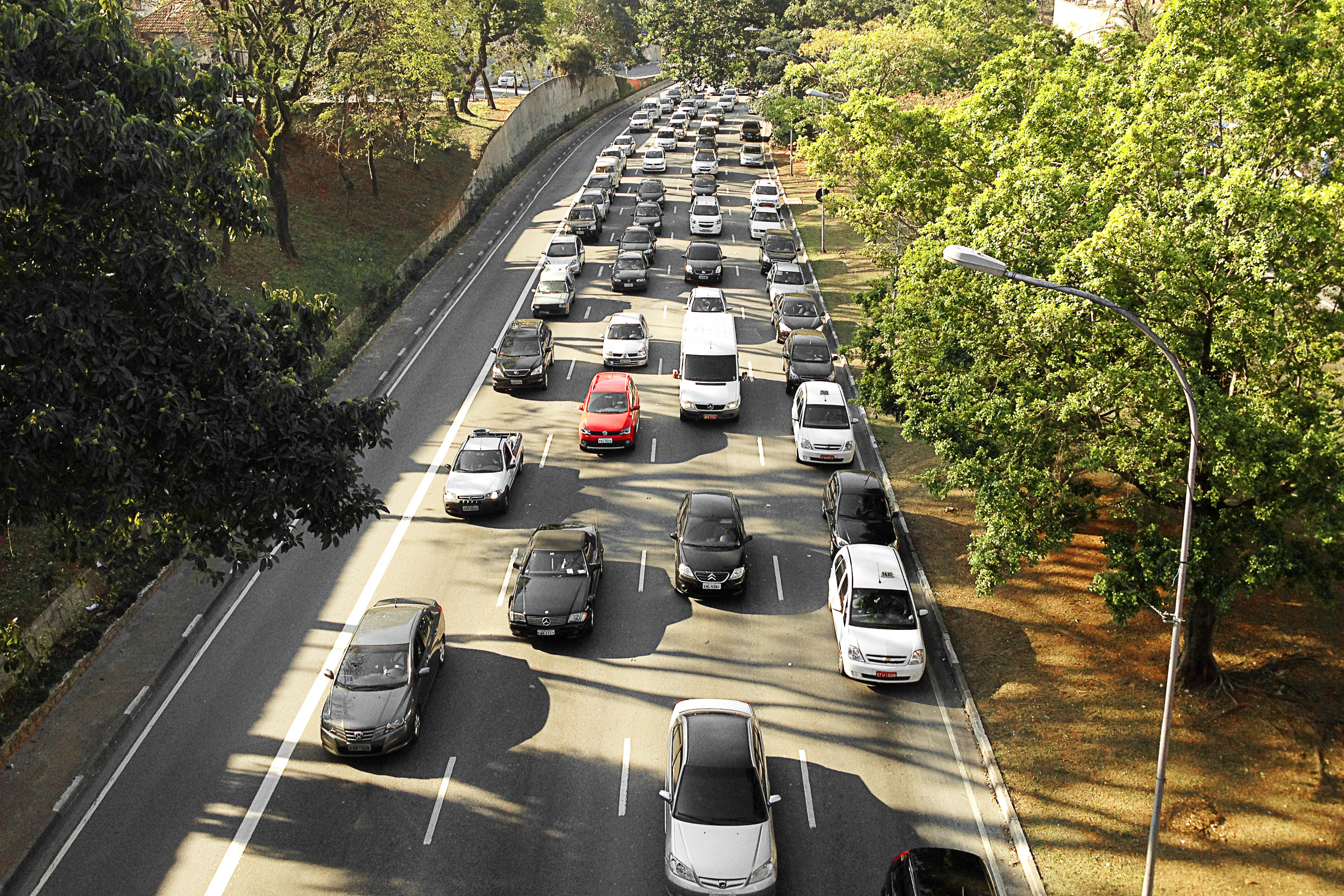
Bus lane on the left, seen from the Pedroso Viaduct.

The São Paulo City Hall faced many difficulties with expropriations, as most of the land to be removed consisted of valley bottoms and backyard areas, restricted by law. The decree expropriating the stretch comprising Jaceguai, Conde de São Joaquim, Condessa de São Joaquim and Liberdade streets was published on November 12, 1960. In 1962, a new decree expropriated an area of around 8,000 to 9,000 square meters covering the block between Cubatão, Estela, Oscar Porto and Tomás Carvalhal streets, where the tunnel that would pass under Largo Guanabara would terminate. However, the tunnel was built in the open at a lower level than the nearby streets until it reached the vicinity of Coronel Oscar Porto Street.

Another problem were the structures that already stood on or next to the route, such as the garages of the Municipal Funeral Service, which occupied the lower part of the Dona Paulina Viaduct, and the large foundations of the planned headquarters of the Department of Highways, located next to the Mauá Palace. The lack of asphalt on the market also affected the pace of construction. In 1961, former Mayor Prestes Maia announced the resumption of work on the avenue, but was criticized by people who thought the Radial Leste was more important. Due to a delay in receiving taxes for 1962, he prioritized other works, but made the necessary expropriations between Assembleia and Paraíso streets.

In November 1963, the City Hall announced that it possessed all the land required to build the avenue. On September 9, 1964, the public notice for the construction of the Condessa de São Joaquim Viaduct was published, with expected investment of R$250 million. One of the buildings demolished was the Church of Santa Generosa, which was located in the old Rodrigues de Abreu Square. The Santa Generosa Viaduct was approved for construction at the end of November 1967. The initial 1,400-meter section, extending from Bandeira Square to the Pedroso Viaduct, began operating on January 25, 1967. In the same month, tenders were opened for the construction of the Rua do Paraíso Viaduct.

On July 8, 1966, the Condessa de Joaquim Viaduct was the first to be inaugurated. Humaitá Street, the only link between Vergueiro Street and Brigadeiro Luís Antônio Avenue, was interrupted with the opening of the new viaduct. On May 29, 1967, the Pedroso Viaduct was delivered. In August 1968, the Beneficência Portuguesa Viaduct was built.

=== Operation ===
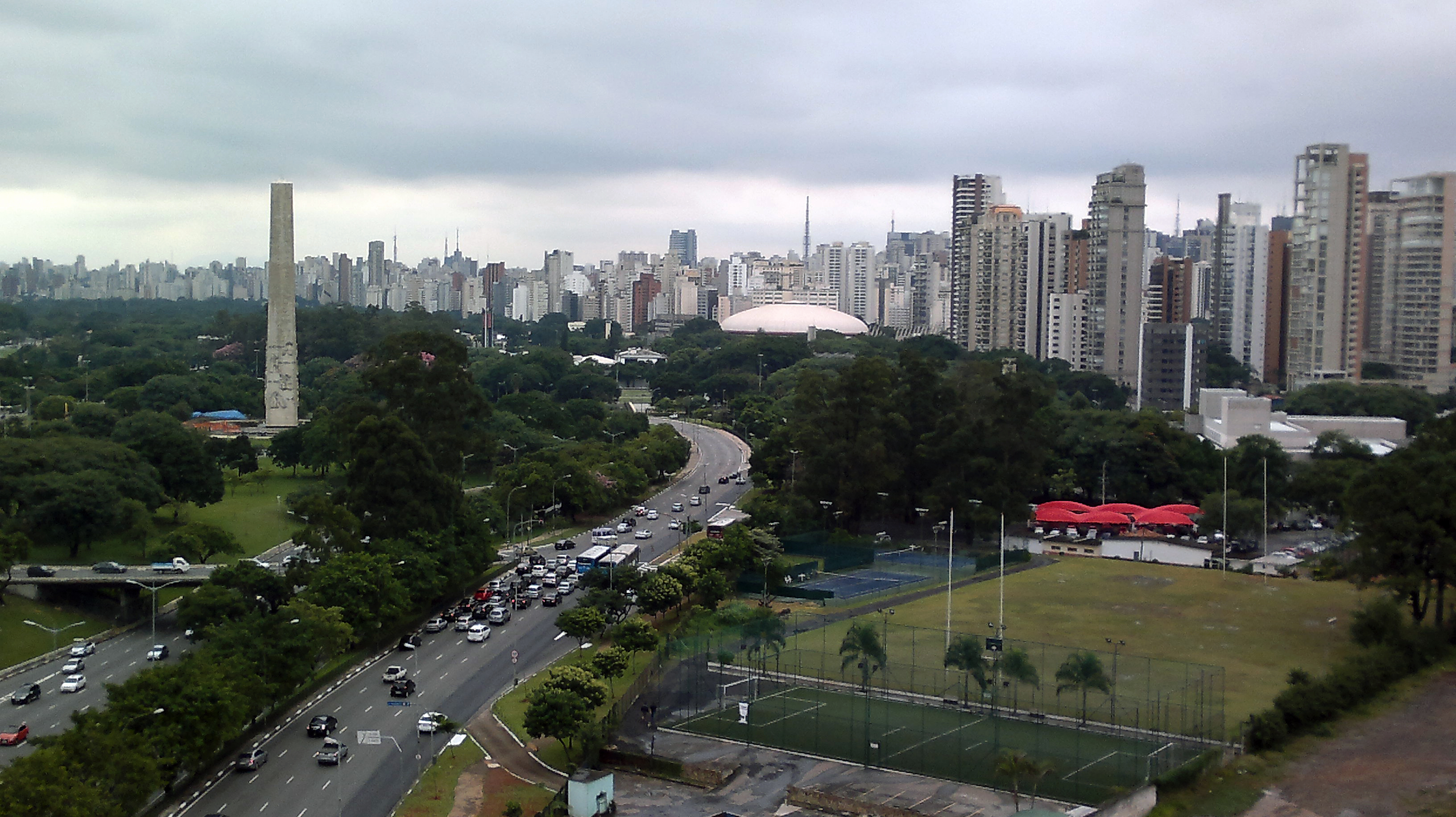
23 de Mayo Avenue, with obelisk at the bottom.

Some stretches of the avenue, such as between Bandeira Square and Paraíso, and Cubatão Street and Ibirapuera Park, were already in operation and in use. The official inauguration took place on January 25, 1969, with some provisional details. In the 1970s, due to poorly designed curves and bad sidewalk, the avenue was considered dangerous and around ten people died every month on average during that time.

On January 25, 2004, the avenue was closed to traffic for the city's 450th anniversary celebrations. In 2010, 23 de Maio Avenue was the second highest for accidents involving motorcyclists in São Paulo. In January 2008, an exclusive motorcycle lane was tested. However, after two days, congestion on the road had doubled and the tests ended after the third day. In July 2010, after the opening of the motorcycle lane on Vergueiro Street, it was discussed banning motorcycles on the avenue, but the Secretary of Transportation, Marcelo Cardinale Branco, halted the proposal. Besides the speed cameras on poles on the road, the Companhia de Engenharia de Tráfego (CET) installed two cameras on the Tutoia and Pedroso viaducts in 2011.

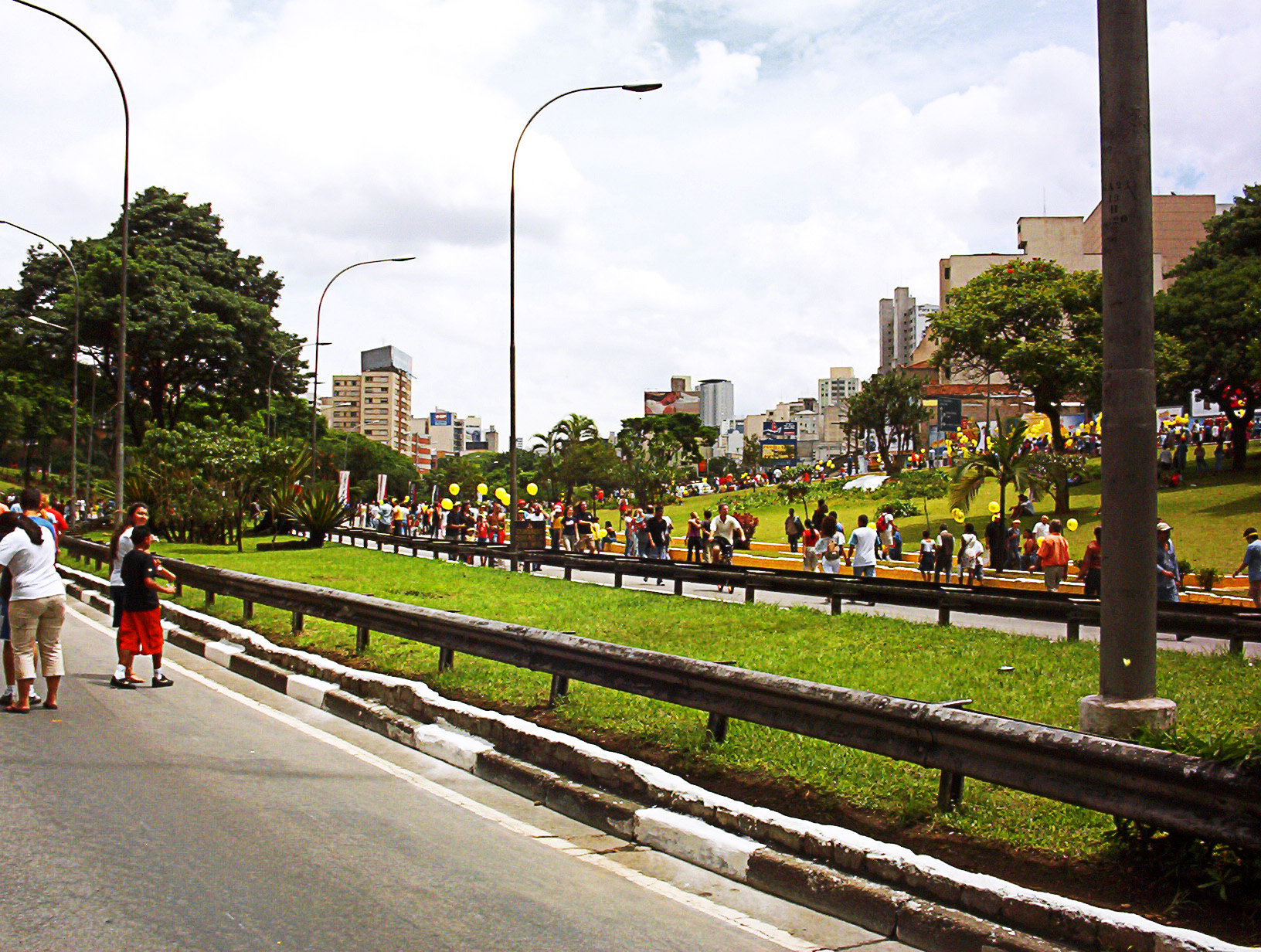
Celebrations for São Paulo's 450th anniversary closed 23 de Maio Avenue to vehicles.

On August 5, 2013, the avenue gained exclusive bus lanes. The lane started operating from Monday to Friday and intended to reduce bus travel times on the North-South Corridor. The following week, the City Hall announced that cars invading the lane would be fined; the infraction was considered light and the amount was R$53.20. On the first day, 708 fines were levied on the North-South Corridor, most of them in the stretch comprising avenues Vinte e Três de Maio, Moreira Guimarães, Rubem Berta and Washington Luís.

After the first week of the corridor's operation, the Companhia de Engenharia de Tráfego (CET) reported that bus speeds had increased by around 40% to 50%, while car speeds had fallen by around 5%. Época magazine considered that the implementation of bus lanes in the city was one of the reasons for Mayor Fernando Haddad's fall in popularity, due to the perception of increased traffic. At the end of the year, the São Paulo City Hall announced a plan for the North-South BRT, which would include viaducts to allow buses traveling on Vinte e Três de Maio to access other avenues in the Ibirapuera region, such as Ibirapuera, Professor Ascendino Reis and Pedro Álvares Cabral.

=== Features ===
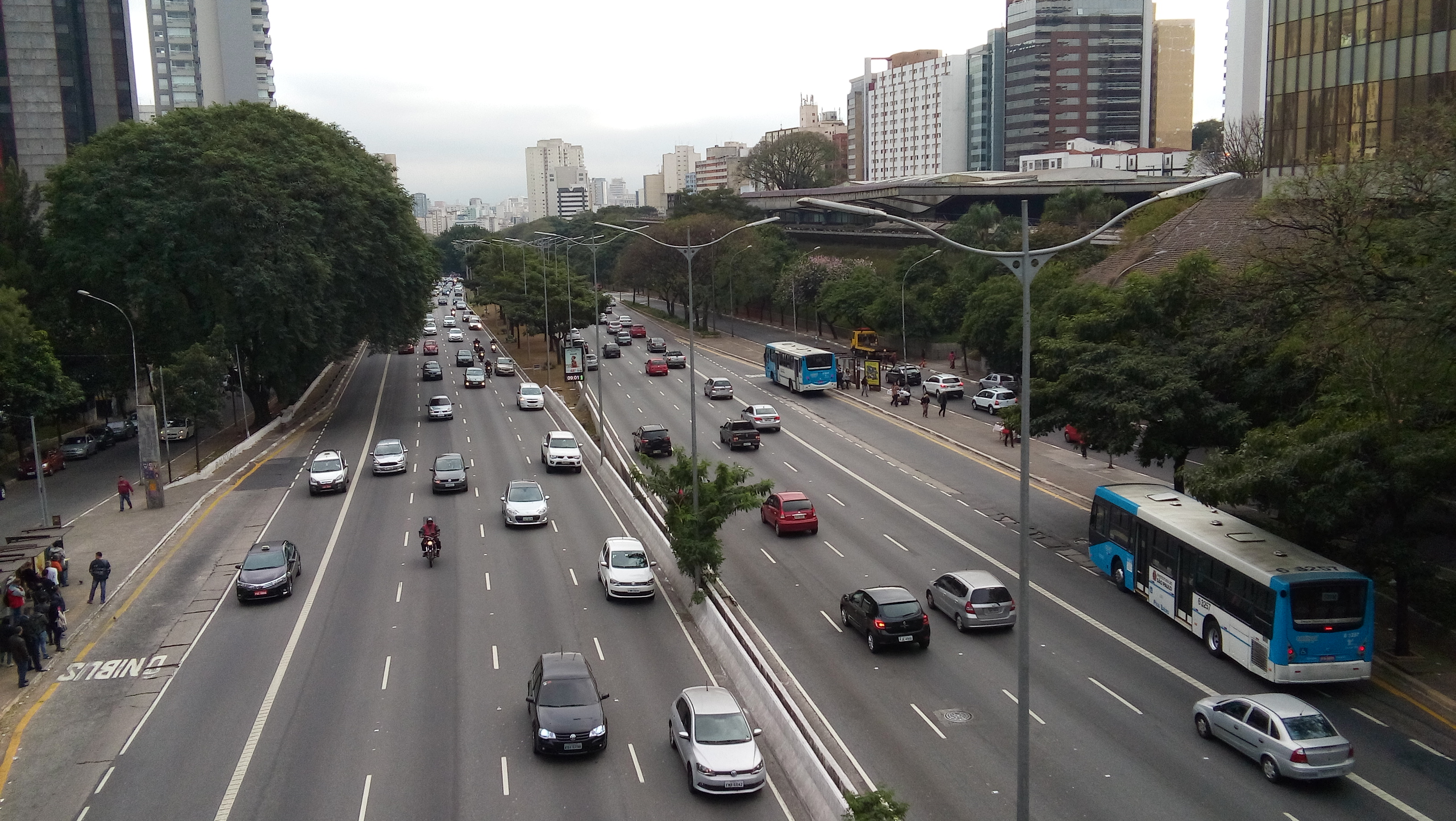
23 de Maio Avenue.

Built over the old Itororó Stream, 23 de Maio Avenue is a divided highway with a total width of 80 meters. It passes under Paulista Avenue at the height of Bernardino de Campos Avenue at a depth of 12 meters. It is named in homage to the day on which four students, two from the Faculty of Law of the University of São Paulo and two from the Polytechnic School of the University of São Paulo, Martins, Miragaia, Dráusio and Camargo, were killed during the Constitutionalist Revolution of 1932.

The Dona Paulina, Condessa de São Joaquim and Pedroso viaducts have an internal structure whose original function was to house future metro stations for the Metro's North-South Line project, which would run in the open air along the avenue's wide central median. The Dona Paulina Viaduct houses the Municipal Funeral Service; the Condessa de São Joaquim, which used to be a hostel, houses homeless families; and the Pedroso Viaduct still functions as a shelter maintained since 1996 by the Methodist Community of Street People.

The speed limit on the avenue, set at 80 kilometers per hour in November 1970, was lowered to 70 kilometers per hour in February 2010. The stretch of the avenue between the Dona Paulina Viaduct and the Anhangabaú tunnel has a speed limit of 60 kilometers per hour because it curves.

== See also ==
- Tourism in the city of São Paulo
