= Bandeirantes Avenue =

Avenue in São Paulo

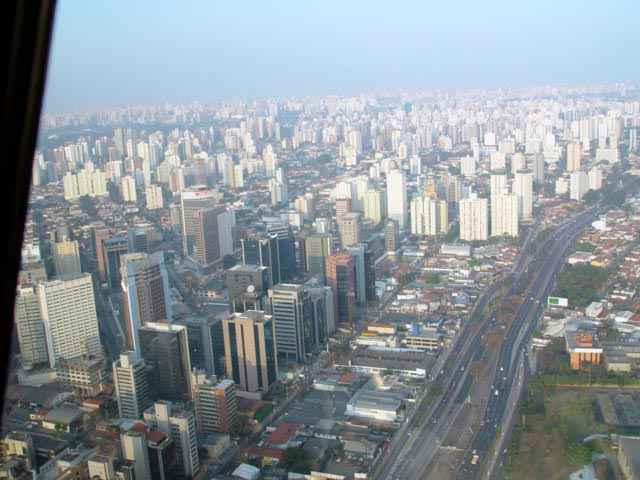
- Aerial view of the avenue
- Native name: Avenida dos Bandeirantes (Portuguese)
- Former name: Estrada da Traição (Betrayal Road)
- Length: 6.01 km (3.73 mi)
- Location: São Paulo, Brazil
- West end: Marginal Pinheiros (Ponte Engenheiro Ari Torres)
- East end: Avenida Afonso D'Escragnolle Tanuay

Construction
- Inauguration: 1970

Bandeirantes Avenue (in Portuguese: Avenida dos Bandeirantes - see Bandeirantes) is one of the most important avenues of São Paulo, serving as one of the main access roads to the Congonhas Airport, as well as a link between Marginal Pinheiros highway and Rodovia Anchieta and Rodovia dos Imigrantes. The avenue had large truck traffic due to the export flow flowing through the Port of Santos, however, after August 2010, the movement of such vehicles on the road was restricted to the nighttime due to the conclusion of the south section of the Rodoanel Mário Covas (see below). The avenue also serves as the southern boundary of the area known as the "expanded central zone." Bandeirantes Avenue originally was called Estrada da Traição ("Betrayal Road"). Traição stream was channeled into a pipeline and the avenue was built on top of this, hence its name.

On July 28, 2010, Mayor Gilberto Kassab announced a ban on trucks on the road on weekdays between 5:00 AM and 9:00 PM (21:00) hours. The measure aims to relieve traffic in the city and encourage the use of the newly opened southern passage Rodoanel Mário Covas, created specifically for the purpose of removing the large cargo trucks from the urban center.
