= Pinheiros River =

Coordinates: 23°31′36″S 46°45′0″W

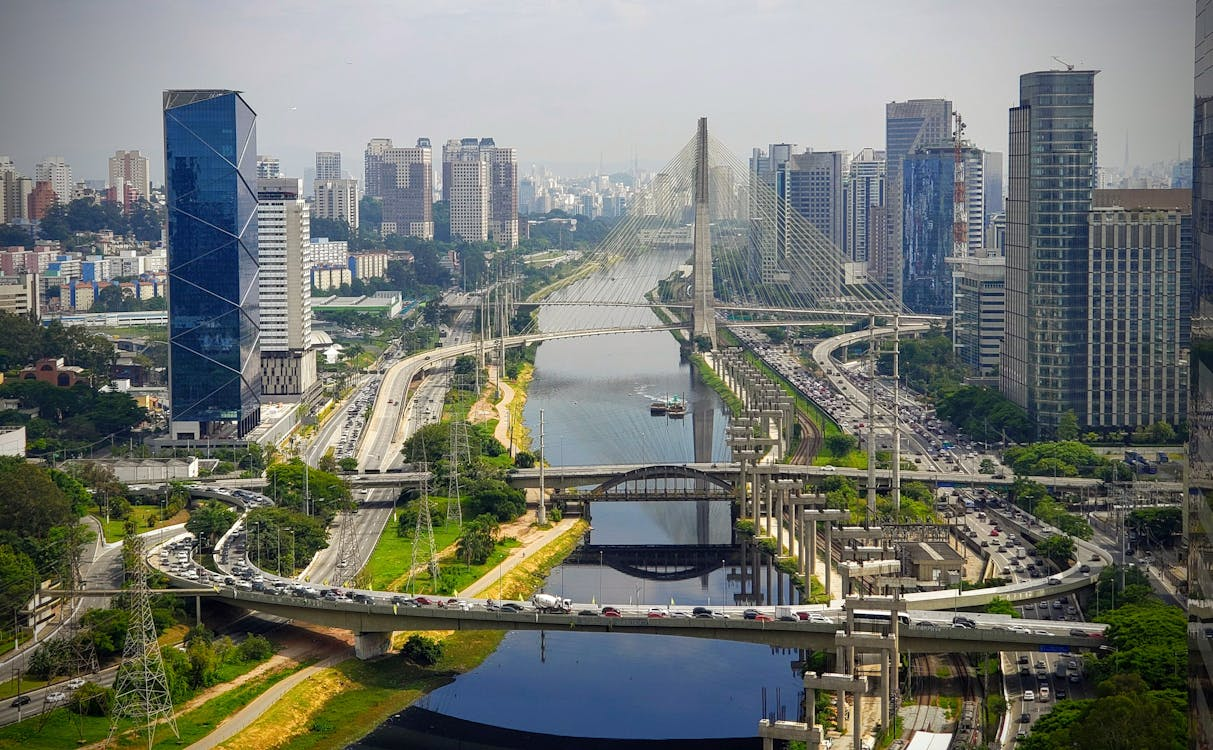
- Pinheiros River
- Native name: Rio Pinheiros (Portuguese)

Location
- Country: Brazil
- Region: São Paulo city, São Paulo state

Physical characteristics
- Source
  - location: confluence of the Guarapiranga River and the Jurubatuba River, São Paulo city
- Mouth
  - location: Rio Tietê, São Paulo city
- Length: 25 km (16 mi)

The Pinheiros River (Portuguese: Rio Pinheiros) is a tributary of the Tietê River that runs 25 kilometres (16 mi) through the city of São Paulo, Brazil. Until 1920, the river was known as Jurubatuba. After being channelized its name was changed to Pinheiros. In southern São Paulo the Pinheiros River is impounded in Billings Reservoir.

== Origin ==
In colonial times, the Pinheiros River was called Jurubatuba, which in the Tupi language means "place with many jerivás palm trees." It came to be called the Pinheiros River by the Jesuits in 1560, when they created an indigenous village called Pinheiros. It was called that because of the large amount of Araucaria (or Brazilian pines) that covered the region. The main road that gave access to the village was Caminho de Pinheiros, which is today Rua da Consolação.

== Geography ==
The Pinheiros river receives the following tributaries: Jaguaré stream, Pirajuçara river, Poá stream, Belini stream, Corujas stream, Verde stream, Iguatemi stream, Sapateiro stream, Uberaba stream, Traição stream, Água Espraiada stream (Jabaquara), Morro do S stream, Ponte Baixa stream, Zavuvus stream and Olaria stream. The sources of these streams are partly in São Paulo, partly in the municipality of Taboão da Serra and partly in the municipality of Embu das Artes.

=== Human usage ===
From 1926 onwards, the river housed sports clubs on its banks, with swimming races and nautical regattas. Pumping stations generated an abundance of cheap energy, capable of supporting the industrialization of the State.

In 1957, the Jurubatuba branch of the Sorocabana Railway was inaugurated, which is now known as Line 9 of the São Paulo Metropolitan Trains.

In 1970, on both banks of the river, Marginal Pinheiros opened, which as an expressway for traffic. However, with so many environmental changes due to human expansion, the riparian forests along the banks of the river dwindled and natural vegetation became extinct. In the small remaining strip of land, power transmission lines, interceptors and sewage outfalls, oil pipelines, telecommunications cables, rainwater galleries and service roads were installed for desilting operations. The Pinheiros River began to receive domestic sewage and industrial waste, which ended up compromising the quality of its waters and the survival of local fauna.

== See also ==
- Tributaries of the Río de la Plata
