= Marginal Pinheiros =

Riverside expressway in the city of São Paulo

SP-015
- Marginal Pinheiros; Via Professor Simão Faiguenboim
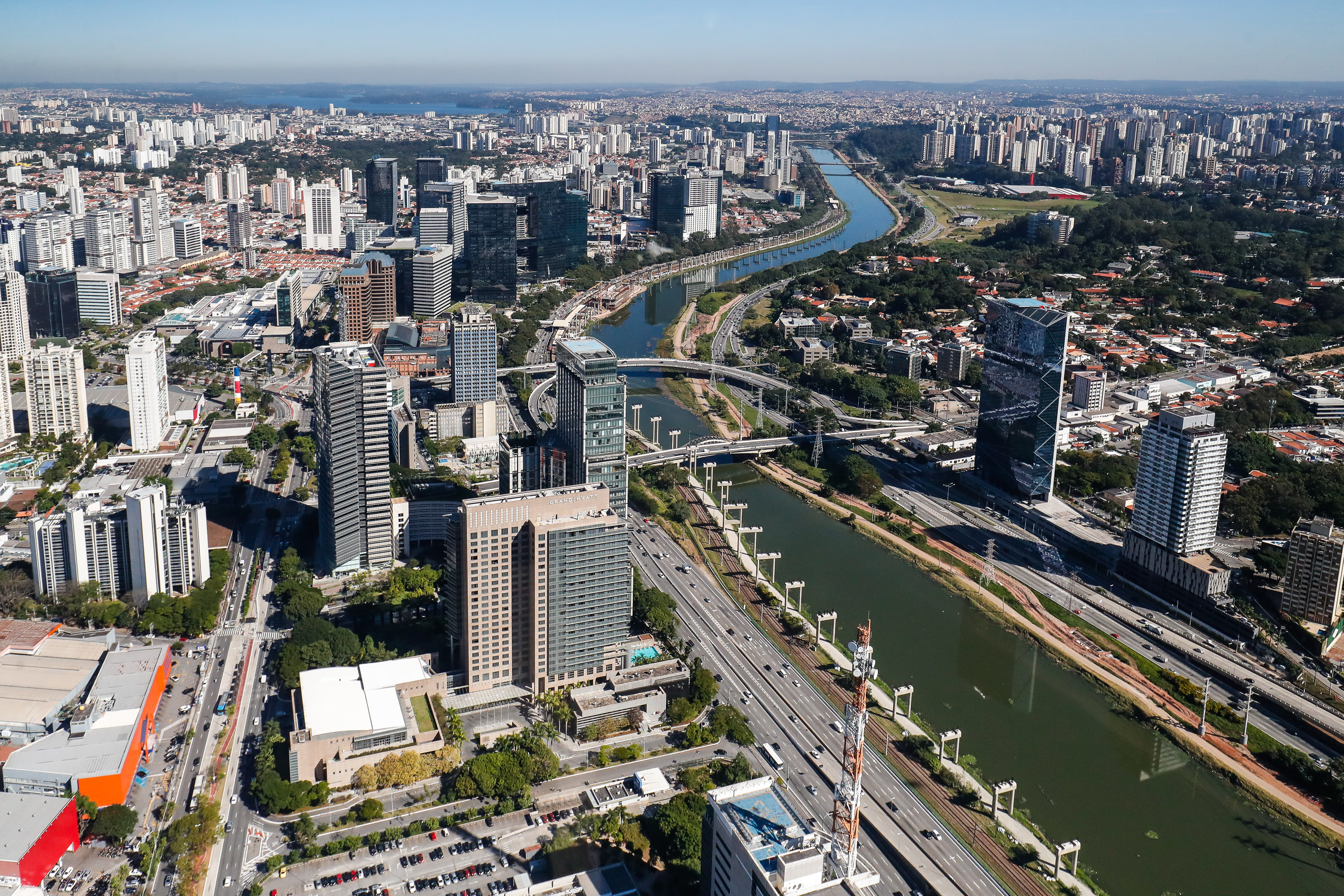
- Marginal Pinheiros

Route information
- Maintained by Prefeitura de São Paulo
- Length: 22.5 km (14.0 mi)
- Existed: 1970 (expanded in 1991)–present

Major junctions
- North end: Marginal Tietê in São Paulo, SP
- C. Branco; R. Tavares (1.5 km (0.93 mi) away); R. Bittencourt (8 km (5.0 mi) away); Imigrantes (9 km (5.6 mi) away); Anchieta (13 km (8.1 mi) away)
- South end: Interlagos Avenue in São Paulo, SP

Location
- Country: Brazil
- State: São Paulo

Highway system
- Highways in Brazil; Federal; São Paulo State Highways

Marginal Pinheiros (officially SP-015) is an expressway that runs along the banks of Pinheiros River through the city of São Paulo, Brazil. It is one of the most important highways in São Paulo, beginning at the triple border of Campos Grande, Cidade Dutra and Socorro and ending at the border of Vila Leopoldina and Jaguaré. It connects the region of Interlagos to the Complexo Viário Heróis de 1932.

It provides access to many important highways of the state of São Paulo, including the Anchieta Highway and the Imigrantes Highway via the Bandeirantes Avenue, the Raposo Tavares Highway and the Régis Bittencourt Highway via the Francisco Morato Avenue, and to the Castelo Branco highway via the Cebolão, a complex of accesses linking Marginal Pinheiros, Marginal Tietê and the aforementioned highway.
