= Zoning in São Paulo =

The zoning of the city of São Paulo, Brazil, is a regulatory way of occupation of the city, with the first zoning plan dating from 1934. The Act 663, from August 10, consolidated the Zoning Legislation and the Buildind Code. It remained under use for four decades and regulated the land use and partial soil occupation of the city. It was replaced in the 70's by the Plano Diretor de Desenvolvimento Integrado/PDDI-Lei nº 7.688/71 (Masterplan for Integrated Development - act 7,688/71), proposed in 1972. It was created to guide and locate the zones, and as a study over the populational density, dimensions, occupancy rate and lot use coefficient.

For forty years, there were no significant changes in the legislation. On September 13, 2002, through the Plano Diretor de Desenvolvimento Estratégico - Lei nº 13.430 (Master Plan for Strategic Development - Act 13,430), new general directions were established related to the land use and soil occupation. This policy for urban development is to be followed by every public and private developer.

This method aims to develop the city, creating industrial, commercial and service dedicated districts. Thus bringing social and cultural development, maintaining the original characteristics of some neighbors and protecting the environment. In other words: a configuration of the urban space guided by the public interest that assures egalitarian well-being of the population.

These norms can halt the construction of irregular edifications throughout all territory, serving as a legal instrument for the population In order to rent or buy a place for Industrial, Commercial or Services use, it is necessary to know the zone in which the building is located.

== Zones ==
- Zone 1

Zone strictly for residential use and low demographic density. Regions consisting in single family units with up to three floors. Usually high end, contributing for the overvaluation of neighboring areas. Concentrated mostly in Central-Southern and Western regions.

Examples (by district): Alto da Lapa, Alto de Pinheiros, Brooklin Velho, Chácara Flora, Cidade Jardim, City Boaçava, City Butantã, Jardim América, Jardim Europa, Jardim Paulistano, Planalto Paulista, Morumbi and Jardim da Saúde. Some areas from region North: City América, Jardim França, Jardim Guapira, Jardim São Bento, Palmas do Tremembé; and from Center-South region: Jardim da Glória.

- Zone 2

Zone for use predominantly residential and with low demographic density. Corresponds to the part of São Paulo that is not included in the other zone's perimeters, characterized by the residential predominance, being also allowed for commercial, services and small industrial and institutional uses. In this zone, the buildings can have a maximum built area equivalent to the lot's area, taking just half of the lot, or it is allowed for the residential to buildings have a built area twice the size of the lot, with an ower surface occupation of the lot. Region 2 is also comprised by single family units with up to three floors, similarly to zone 1, but allowing twinned houses and local businesses.

Examples (by district): Vila Madalena, Alto da Lapa, Vila Olímpia, surrounding areas from Billings and Guarapiranga dams, from Parque do Carmo, and practically all northern city boundary near Cantareira reservation.
