= Second presidency of Lula da Silva =

Brazilian presidential administration since 2023

- Second presidency of Lula da Silva; 1 January 2023 – present
- Vice President: Geraldo Alckmin
- Cabinet: See list
- Party: Workers' Party
- Election: 2022; 2026
- Seat: Palácio do Planalto (workplace); Palácio da Alvorada (residence)

The second presidency of Luiz Inácio Lula da Silva, also known as Lula's third government, began on 1 January 2023, when Luiz Inácio Lula da Silva returned to office for a third term as President of Brazil. A member of the Workers' Party (PT), Lula was elected in the second round of the 2022 presidential election, defeating incumbent president Jair Bolsonaro. He became the first Brazilian president to be elected to three terms and the first since Getúlio Vargas to return to the presidency after an interval between terms. The administration took office amid deep political polarization and the aftermath of the 2022–2023 Brazilian coup attempt, with the 8 January attacks on Brazil's government institutions constituting one of its first major political crises.

The administration has been characterized by the restoration and expansion of social and public policies, changes to Brazil's fiscal and tax framework, and efforts to strengthen the role of the federal government. Major economic measures included the approval of a consumption tax reform and the replacement of the previous spending cap with a new fiscal framework. The government recorded periods of economic growth and declining unemployment, while facing concerns over public debt, fiscal sustainability, interest rates, household indebtedness, corporate financial difficulties, and the rising cost of living, particularly food prices.

Lula's administration has also sought to restore Brazil's international role and expand its participation in multilateral diplomacy, while placing greater emphasis on environmental policy and efforts to combat deforestation. Brazil hosted the 2025 United Nations Climate Change Conference (COP30) in Belém. The government's foreign policy was also affected by international tensions and economic disputes, including the Brazil–United States diplomatic crisis of 2025–2026.

The administration has been marked by political controversies and debates over the regulation of digital platforms, disinformation, freedom of expression, and the protection of children online. Domestically, the government has faced challenges in its relationship with Congress and debates over public spending and economic policy. Initially composed of 37 ministries, the administration underwent changes to its ministerial structure and adopted a new government identity and slogan, "On the Side of the Brazilian People", in 2025.

== Background ==
On 20 May 2021, in an interview with French magazine Paris Match, Lula confirmed that he was a pre-candidate for the next year's elections.

The Workers' Party national committee, on 13 April 2022, approved the nomination of former Governor of São Paulo Geraldo Alckmin (PSB) for vice president. The ticket was officialized on 7 May, in a coalition formed by the Brazil of Hope Federation (formed by Workers' Party, Communist Party of Brazil and Green Party), Brazilian Socialist Party, Solidarity and PSOL REDE Federation. With the withdrawal of André Janones on 4 August, the ticket received official support of Avante and Agir.

The campaign was marked by polarization and Manichaeism, in which Lula's campaign tried to characterize him as the only alternative in the second round for those who believed in democracy and human rights, while Bolsonaro sought to associate Lula with communism/socialism and far-left anti-democratic regimes such as Venezuela, Cuba, Bolivia, and Nicaragua. The new government would face a fairly conservative Congress, with many of Bolsonaro's ministers and figures close to Bolsonarism occupying seats in parliament. On 2 October, the day of the first round, Lula placed first with 48.43% of the valid votes, leading to a runoff with Jair Bolsonaro, who garnered 43.20% of the valid votes. Lula was elected in the second round, on 30 October, being the first President of Brazil elect for three terms and the first since Getúlio Vargas to be elected for a non-consecutive term.

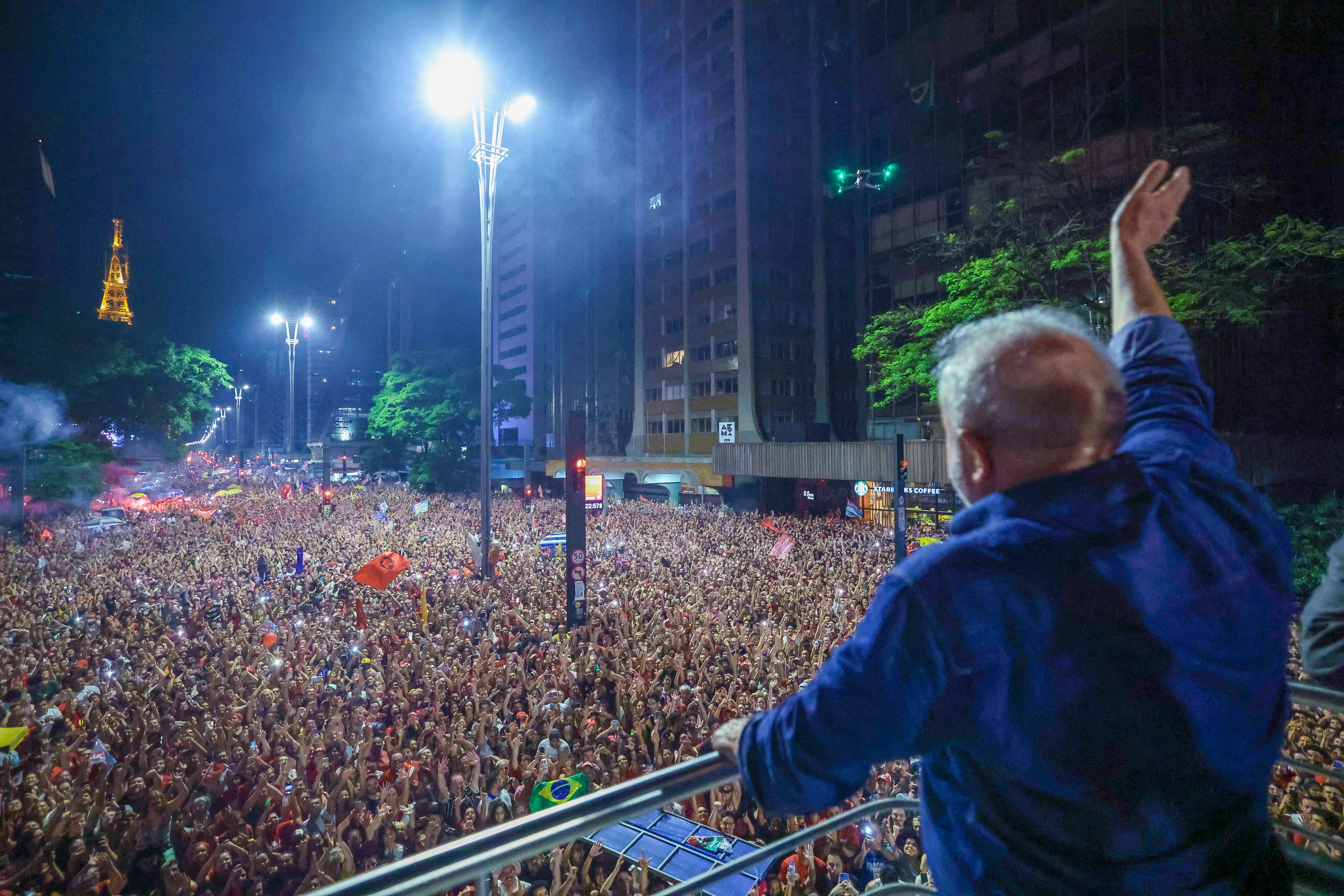
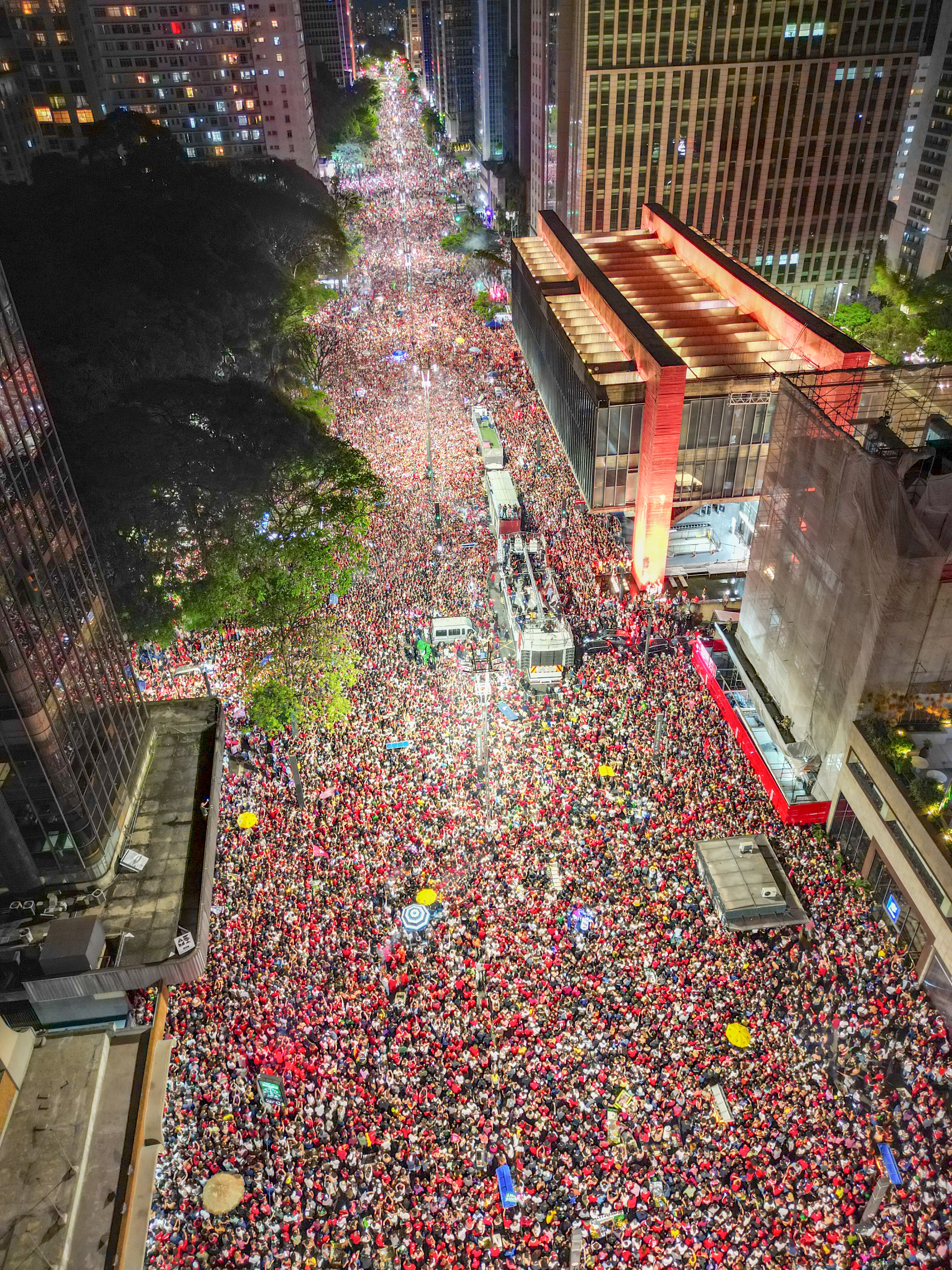
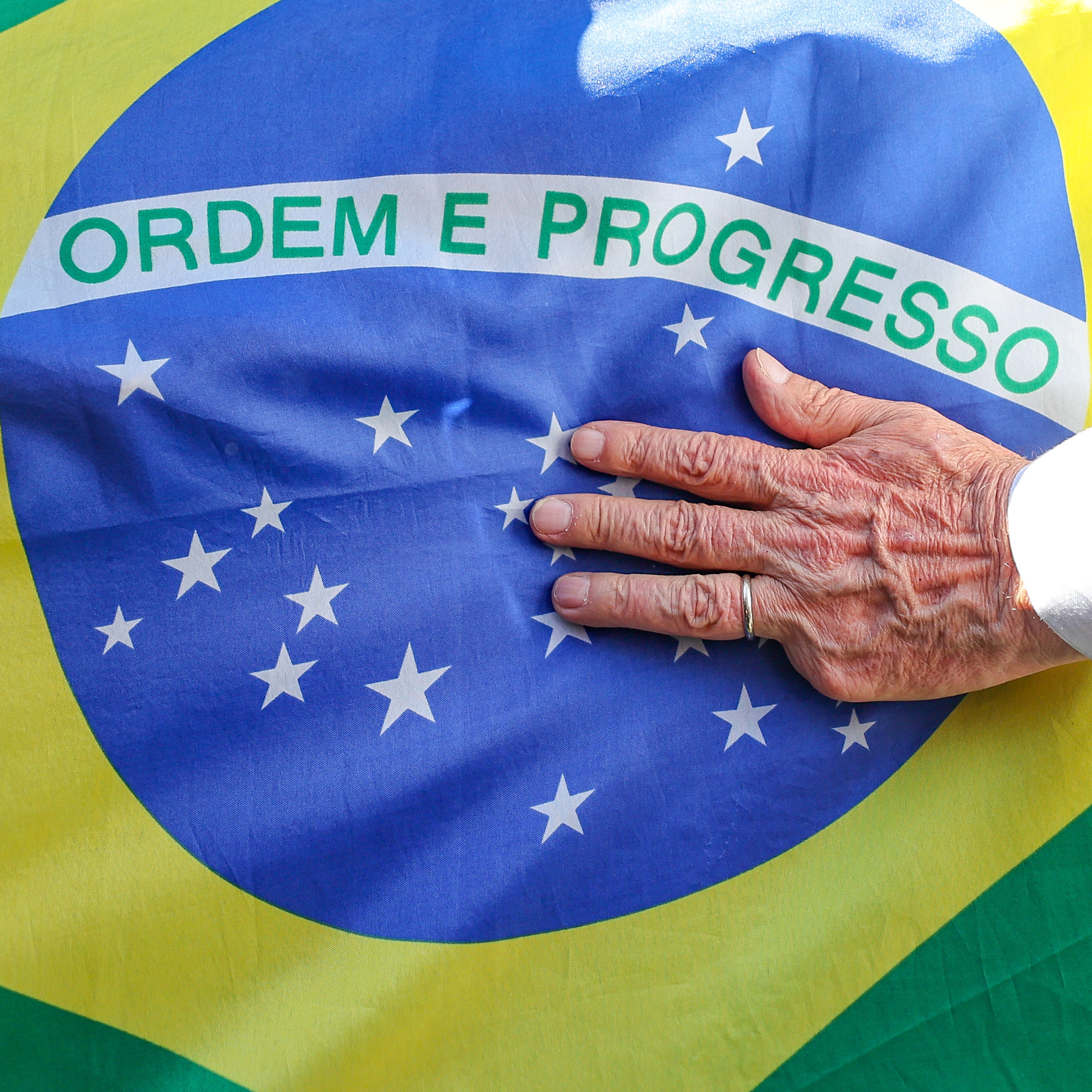
Lula speaking to a crowd on Paulista Avenue

In his post-election victory speech, Lula adopted a more moderate tone, saying that he intends to "pacify the country". Though he later, indirectly, called his political opponent Jair Bolsonaro authoritarian and fascist, by saying that he had "defeated authoritarianism and fascism in Brazil". This was considered to be a repeat of previous rhetoric from during the election campaign, when Lula frequently compared his rival to leaders of the military dictatorship and the fascist regimes of Italy and Germany, as well calling Bolsonaro a "plague of locusts".

He was inaugurated on 1 January 2023. That day Lula and Geraldo Alckmin were sworn in as president and vice-president of Brazil, respectively, for the period 1 January 2023 – 4 January 2027.

== Government plan ==
Lula has as some of his main proposals in his government plan: "the reconstruction of the country facing the economic crisis; with democracy, sovereignty, and peace; with the economic development and stability; with the fight against poverty; with education; with the implementation of a National System of Culture and extension of housing programmes".

=== Planned executive decisions ===
Lula's administration planned several decisions reversing those made by Bolsonaro's administration, including:

- Withdraw from the Geneva Consensus Declaration
- Rejoin the Union of South American Nations and the Community of Latin American and Caribbean States
- Restore recognition of Nicolás Maduro as president of Venezuela and reopen the Brazilian embassy in Caracas
- Restore goals of reduction of greenhouse gas emissions according to the Paris Agreement
- Restore monitoring against deforestation of the Amazon rainforest and illegal mining
- Relaunch the Growth Acceleration Programme
- Relaunch the Minha Casa, Minha Vida programme

== Transition ==
In his victory speech, Lula adopted a moderate tone, saying he wants to "pacify the country". The new government faced a very conservative Congress, with many former ministers and people close to Bolsonarism.

On 1 November 2022, Vice President-elect Geraldo Alckmin was appointed as coordinator of the government-elect transition team. On 3 November, Alckmin and the Chief of Staff of the Presidency, Ciro Nogueira, had a meeting to being the government transition. Lula also met with political leaderships, aiming to adjust the federal budget in 2022, to enable the objectives of the future government.

== 2023 invasion of the Brazilian Congress ==
In response to an attack by supporters of former President Bolsonaro on the Praça dos Três Poderes, Lula announced that he had signed a decree declaring a state of emergency in the Federal District until the end of January.

== Ministers ==
Although he had not yet officially formalized the choices, Lula confirmed, on 1 December, the lawyer Fernando Haddad, former mayor of São Paulo, former Minister of Education and his substitute in the 2018 electoral campaign, for the position of Minister of Finance; the diplomat Mauro Vieira for the position of Minister of Foreign Affairs; the former minister of the Federal Court of Accounts José Múcio for the position of Minister of Defence (being the first civilian to assume the function since Raul Jungmann) and the former governor of Maranhão, Flávio Dino, as Minister of Justice. On 9 December, Rui Costa was announced as the Chief of Staff of the Presidency. On 29 December, Lula finalized the list of ministries, defining 37 ministers in total.

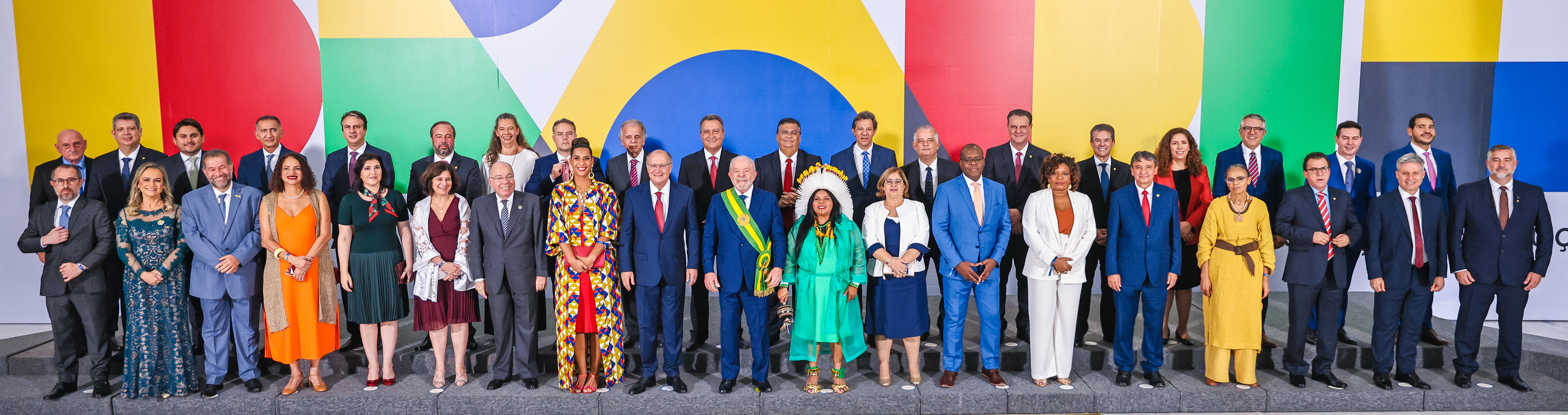
Lula and his ministerial team on 1 January 2023, the day of his inauguration

=== Ministerial changes ===
The first ministerial change occurred in July 2023. Daniela Carneiro, after requesting disaffiliation from União Brasil, was replaced by Celso Sabino (UNIÃO-PA) in the Ministry of Tourism.

On 6 September 2023, the first ministerial reform of the government was carried out, with the aim of obtaining greater governability. Lula replaced Ana Moser with the deputy André Fufuca (PP-BA) in the Ministry of Sport and Márcio França (PSB-SP) with Silvio Costa Filho, of the Republicanos, in the Ministry of Ports and Airports. Márcio França assumed the newly created Ministry of Entrepreneurship and Small Businesses.

On Wednesday, 31 January 2024, Lula officially dismissed Flávio Dino from the leadership of the Ministry of Justice, after having nominated him to the position of justice of the Supreme Federal Court (STF) in the seat left by Rosa Weber with her compulsory retirement. To replace him, Ricardo Lewandowski was appointed, a former member of the Supreme Court who had left the body in the previous year, also due to compulsory retirement.

On 6 September 2024, the Minister of Human Rights, Silvio Almeida, was dismissed from the position after it was disclosed that the NGO MeToo Brasil had received complaints of sexual harassment against him. On 9 September, the president announced that the Minas Gerais State deputy Macaé Evaristo (PT) will occupy the leadership of the Ministry of Human Rights.

== Domestic affairs ==
=== First measures ===
Right after taking office on 1 January 2023, Lula and his ministers took several measures to revert Bolsonaro policies and/or create policies announced during the election campaign and the transition of power. This process, known as "desbolsonarização" (de-'Bolsonarization') or "revogaço" (mass repeal of decrees) by some ministers and party members included a series of federal decrees revoking the previous government's measures involving weapons, environment policies and top officials' data secrecy.

Some of the decrees included temporarily suspending new authorizations for shooting clubs, revoking Bolsonaro government policies that allowed "artisan mining" in the Amazon rainforest area and indigenous lands (which were seen as an incentive to illegal miners). and the creation of the "Secretary of Digital Policies", which was to be established under the Secretary of Social Communications with the stated objective of "combatting the spread of disinformation, fake news and hate speech on the internet".

On the same week, Environment and Climate Change Minister Marina Silva claimed that another "revogaço" was yet to come. Mostly related to the teto de gastos (debt ceiling) fiscal policy, which was seen as impractical by government officials. This policy was later replaced with another debt limit law following its approval in the Federal Congress. On 2 January 2023, more "revogaços" happened, measures included stopping the privatization process of some eight state-owned companies (such as the Correios and Petrobras) and dismissing almost a thousand appointees in federal posts linked in some way to the Bolsonaro government.

On 11 January, Lula signed into law the project which makes the CPF the only necessary document for identification, after its approval by the Federal Congress.

=== Agriculture ===
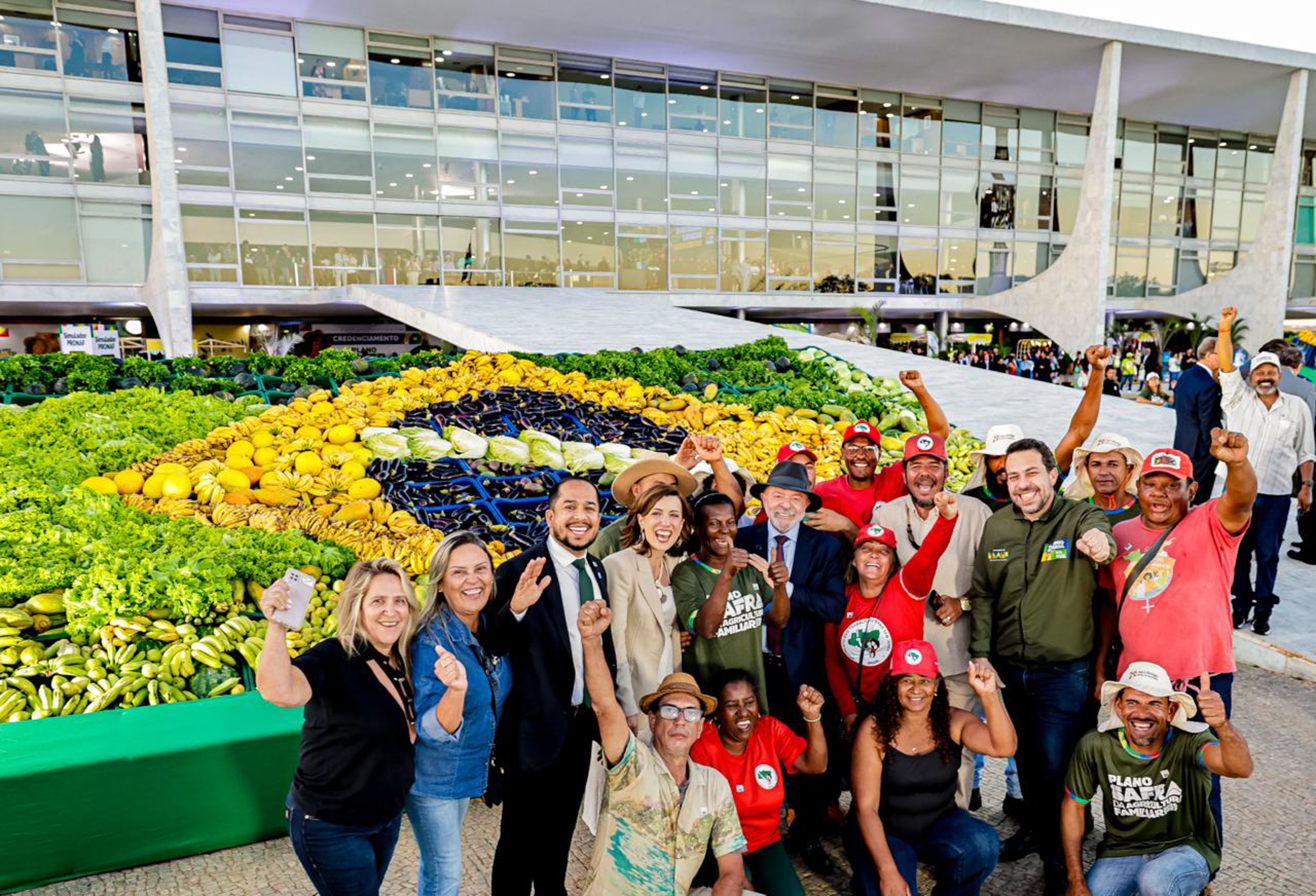
Lula in 2026, during the launch ceremony of the Family Farming Harvest Plan

Seeking to mend ties with the agribusiness sector, the government launched the 2023–2024 Crop Plan, providing R$364 billion in rural credit at interest rates below those prevailing in the financial market. This represented a 27% increase in funds compared to the 2022–2023 edition under the previous administration. The "Family Farming Harvest Plan" was also launched, which sought to strengthen family farming by extending rural credit to small and medium landowners, with around R$77.7 billion in resources being released for this plan in 2023-2024, a 34% increase in funding compared to the 2022–2023 edition.

For the 2024–2025 edition, the government released R$400 billion in resources for large landowners, and R$85,7 billion for small and medium ones. The 2025–2026 edition released another R$516 billion in rural credit for large landowners, and R$78,2 billion for family farming. For the 2026–2027 edition, it released R$525.1 billion in credit for the agribusiness and another R$85 billion for small farms.

=== Economy ===
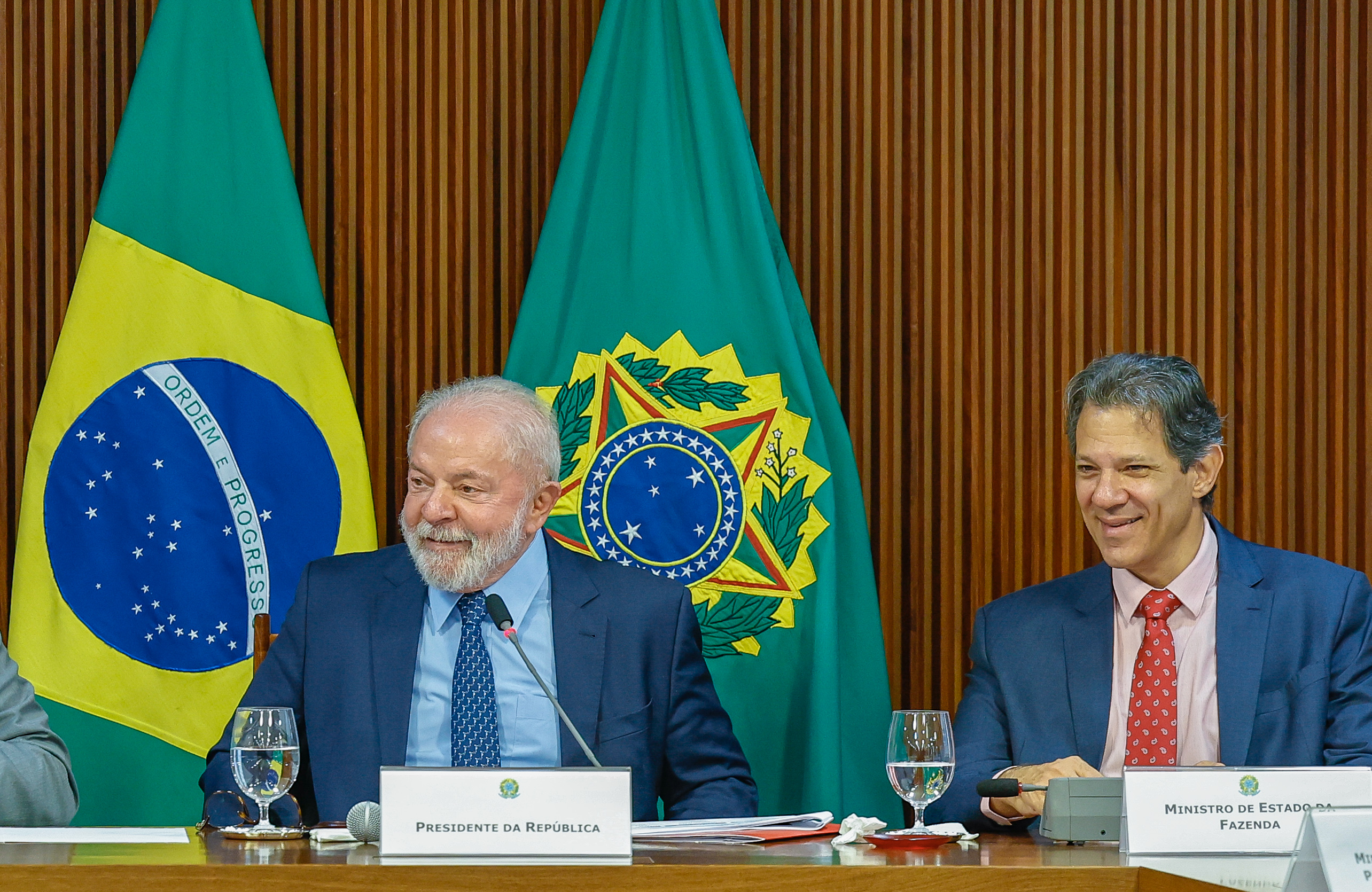
Lula in a meeting alongside finance minister Fernando Haddad

Among the measures on the first day of government, Lula signed a provisional measure extending the fuel tax exemption instituted by Bolsonaro in 2022. Bolsonaro's tax exemption was considered "demagogic" by minister Fernando Haddad and "electoral fraud" with "electoral bias" according to an analysis by several economists, as he did so with the intention of seeking re-election, but without facing "the real problem of fuel prices in the country, which is Petrobras' pricing policy". Federal taxes remained zero for gasoline and ethanol until the end of February, while the exemption for natural gas, diesel and biodiesel was extended until the end of the year; the extension, with an estimated impact of 25 billion reais, was seen as a defeat for Haddad and a victory for the president of the Workers' Party, Gleisi Hoffmann, concerned about the political impact that raising prices on the first day of government would cause. At the end of February, the gradual re-encumbrance of gasoline and diesel was announced, as well as the taxation of crude oil exports for 4 months.

Lula has been criticizing the president of the Central Bank of Brazil, Roberto Campos Neto, for maintaining the basic interest rate at 13.75% per year, and has even considered ending the institution's autonomy in the future. The presidents of the Senate and the Chamber ruled out this possibility. According to some analysts, these attacks by Lula on the president of the BC are "shooting himself in the foot", as they would increase the inflation expectations of economic agents, resulting in more inflation in practice, in addition to increasing future interest rates, having the opposite of the intended effect. Campos Neto, seeking to relax the relationship with Planalto, gave an interview in February to the programme Roda Viva, on the TV Cultura, in which he adopted a calming tone, avoiding confrontation with the government. In a survey carried out with financial market agents in March 2023, 94% reported not trusting Lula, while 68% said they trusted Campos Neto.

In March, The Ministry of Social Security, through the National Social Security Council, determined the reduction of the maximum monthly interest rate on loans allocated to benefits paid by the National Social Security Institute, from 2.14% to 1.70% per month. The measure, which was not approved by the Treasury or the Civil House, caused almost all financial institutions to stop offering this line of credit, as they now considered it economically unviable.

Haddad announced, in March 2023, that an agreement was signed with the states and the Federal District to compensate for the loss of revenue resulting from the modifications made in 2022 of the criteria for charging ICMS on fuels, electricity, communications and transport; 26.9 billion Reals will be transferred until 2026, through the reduction of debts owed by federal entities to the Union. In November 2023, supported by a decision from the Supreme Federal Court, the government announced that it will pay off, through extraordinary credit (which is not included in the spending ceiling) the stock of court orders left by the Jair Bolsonaro government, estimated at between 90 and 95 billion reais.

According to the magazine Veja, Brazil recorded 2,273 corporate judicial recovery requests in 2024, the highest number in the historical series.

==== Record GDP growth ====
At the end of 2023, Brazil once again became one of the ten largest economies in the world, according to the IMF, the country had dropped out of the ranking between 2019 and 2022, when it fell to 13th place. Also at the end of 2023, the Brazilian trade balance marked the largest surplus in its history, with 98 billion dollars, a significant jump in relation to the 2022 surplus, of 61 billion dollars, which was the previous record. This increase was sustained by the 1.7% increase in exports and the 11.7% drop in imports, resulting from the 8.8% decline in the price of imported items, such as fertilizers, whose price decreased by 44.9% in comparison with 2022. The current account showed a deficit of 28 billion dollars in 2023 and direct investment in the country totaled 62 billion dollars.

Released on 1 March 2024, Brazil's GDP grew 2.9% in the first year of the Lula government. The increase was driven especially by the super harvest in the agricultural sector, the recovery of the services sector and the job market, the maintenance of social spending, and the expansion of fiscal space opened by the New Fiscal Framework; growth surpassed the first year of the Bolsonaro, Temer, Dilma 2, Lula 1 and FHC 2 governments, being lower only than the first year of the Dilma 1, Lula 2 and FHC 1 governments.

==== Unemployment decline ====
During Lula's third term, Brazil recorded a series of historic reductions in unemployment according to data from the Brazilian Institute of Geography and Statistics (IBGE).

In 2024 the country achieved an average annual unemployment rate of 6.6%, the lowest in the historical series at that time.

In early 2025, the downward trend continued, reaching 6.2% in the quarter ending in May and later 5.8% in the quarter ending in June. By the quarter ending in September 2025, unemployment reached 5.6%, consolidating the best labor market result in more than a decade.

==== Tax Reform ====
For the first time since the redemocratization in Brazil (over 30 years ago), a tax reform was approved in congress; among its main points is the exemption from taxes for basic food products, as well as the creation of the VAT (Value Added Tax) and the "selective tax", (or "sin tax", a tax on items considered harmful to public health and the environment). Medicine, vegetables, medical devices, among other goods, will also be exempt from VAT charges, while other products such as speedboats, jets and yachts will become susceptible to IPVA charges. The reform also creates progressive taxation on inheritances, which received mild criticism from some sectors of the society.

The National Congress enacted the reform on 20 December 2023, in a solemn session attended by the three heads of the republic's powers (executive, legislative and judiciary), as well as ministers Fernando Haddad, from the finance ministry, and Simone Tebet, from the planning ministry; Senate President Rodrigo Pacheco described the promulgation of the reform as "not only a historic milestone, but also a turning point" and claimed that this would "change Brazil's trajectory". After the approval of the reform, the risk rating agency S&P Global Ratings raised Brazil's credit rating and highlighted "better prospects for economic growth".

==== Desenrola Brasil ====
In July 2023, the Ministry of Finance launched the first phase of the "Emergency Debt Renegotiation Programme for Indebted Individuals" (popularly known as the Desenrola Brasil programme), a debt renegotiation programme which was divided into two phases. In October of the same year, the second phase, in which non-bank debts were renegotiated, was launched.

Desenrola Brasil is made up of four "participants" (the federal government, debtors, creditors (such as financial institutions, public utility services, retail companies, service providers in general, including individual microentrepreneurs and small businesses), and financial agents, such as banks) and has the stated objective of reducing debt among the population (especially the low income and middle classes), as well as facilitating access to credit by the general population.

==== New fiscal control framework ====
Due to the provision included in the Transition constitutional amendment proposal, the government needed to submit to the National Congress a new fiscal framework to replace the spending ceiling, the government soon presented the proposal to the congress, which was accepted on 22 August. With the new law coming into effect, it established a floor and ceiling for the real growth of tax expenditures of 0.6% and 2.5% respectively; investments now also have a minimum correction floor at the level of inflation; furthermore, growth in fiscal spending is limited to 70% of the growth in government revenues of the previous year; the new framework also determines the application of gradual spending containment triggers in the case where the government is systematically unable to meet fiscal targets.

With approval, the government said it hoped to be able to eliminate the primary deficit in 2024 and obtain surpluses of 0.5% and 1% of GDP in 2025 and 2026, respectively; the expectations were seen with skepticism not only by the market, but also by members of the government itself and parliamentarians. Lula himself later stated that the 2024 target is unlikely to be achieved, defending the expansion of spending on public works, even at the expense the increase in debt.

=== Social policies ===
==== Minimum wage and income tax reforms ====
On 16 February, Lula increased the value of the minimum wage from 1,302 reals to 1,320 reals, correcting it above inflation. In December, there was another increase on the minimum wage, going from 1,320 to 1,412 reals, the increase became effective on 1 January 2024. According to Lula, these actions are the result of a new "minimum wage valorization" project idealized by him, which will adjust the minimum wage over inflation every year, as a way to keep up with the price changes for basic products.

In early 2023, there was also an increase in the exemption from Income tax to 2,640 reals, compared to the previous amount of 1,900 reals. In February 2024, continuing the increase in income tax exemption, Lula issued a provisional measure that exempts those who receive up to 2,824 reais from payment (equivalent to two minimum wages per month).

==== Bolsa Família ====
The Bolsa Família programme had been replaced by the previous government with the Auxílio Brasil. However, due to criticism of the latter, Bolsa Família was reimplemented by the Lula government, replacing Auxílio Brasil. The amount of R$600 reserved for the year 2022 in Auxílio Brasil was guaranteed by Bolsa Família, which would maintain it indefinitely, increasing its value to R$670; the new Bolsa Família started to be paid from March 2023. In July 2023, the federal government announced that more than 43.5 million people had left the poverty line in June, largely attributing the achievement to the reopening and reformulation of Bolsa Família, which now had the average payment of R$705,40 per family, the highest average in its history.

Throughout 2023, the Cadastro Único (CadÚnico), the information base used to define families eligible for Bolsa Família, was revised and 1.7 million single-person families were excluded, according to the government, some members of families benefiting from Bolsa Família had separated themselves and formed, nominally, an independent family, in order to receive individual payment of the benefit, taking advantage of the declaratory feature of the registration.

==== Public housing ====
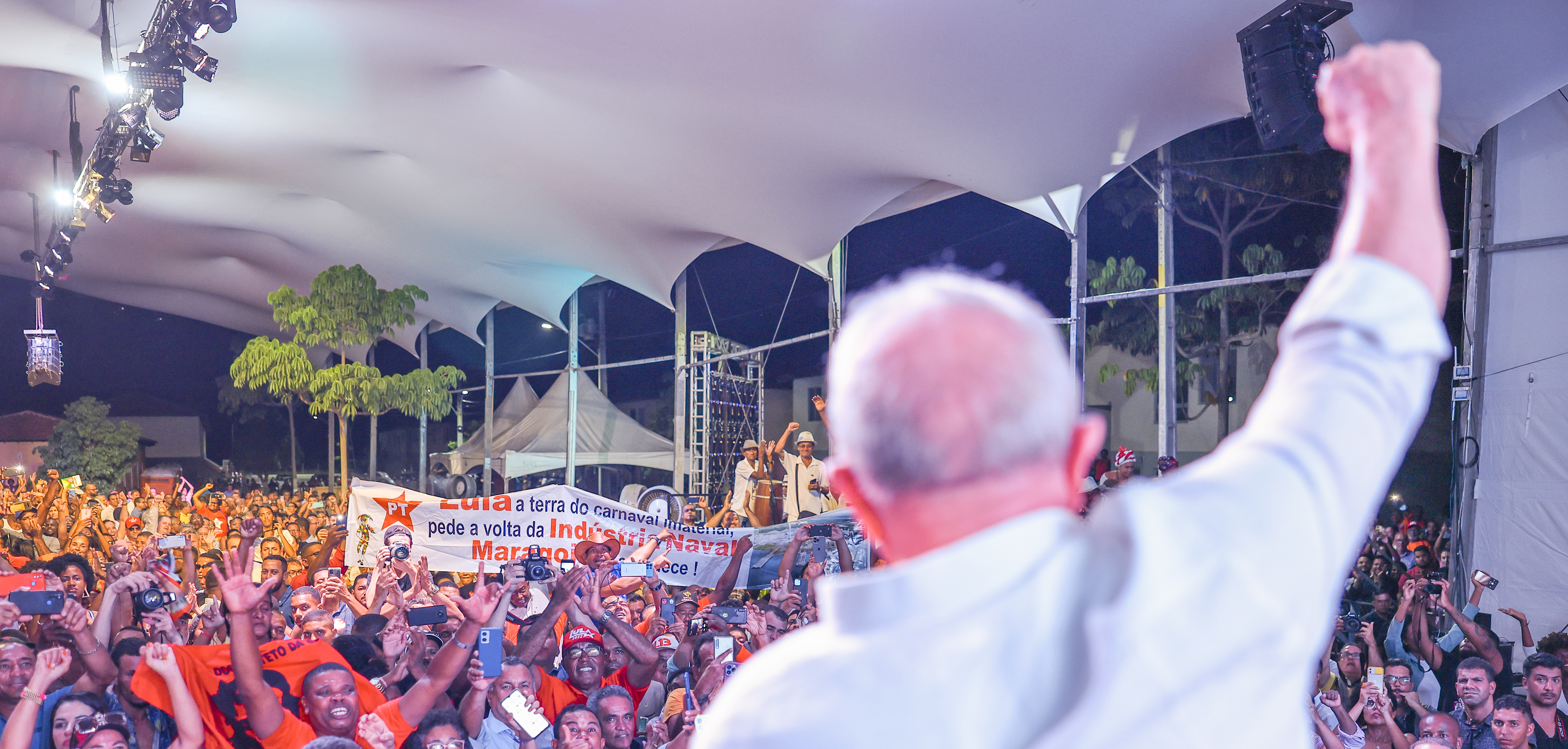
Lula during the relaunch of the Minha Casa, Minha Vida in Santo Amaro, Bahia

On 14 February, Lula, alongside the Governor of Bahia Jerônimo Rodrigues, the Chief of Staff of the Presidency Rui Costa, the President of the Caixa Econômica Federal Maria Rita Serrano, the transport minister Renan Filho, the Minister of Cities Jader Filho, as well as state and municipal authorities (such as the mayor of the city and federal/state deputies from Bahia), announced the return of the Minha Casa, Minha Vida programme during a visit to the city of Santo Amaro, Bahia; the programme will replace the Bolsonaro government's Casa Verde e Amarela programme (which in turn had replaced Lula's first Minha Casa, Minha Vida, created during his previous presidency), the programme is expected to create over 2 million houses for the low-income population by the end of 2026 (the last year of Lula's presidency). The programme was also restructured, with the proposal to serve families with a monthly income of up to R$8,000 in urban areas, and an annual income of up to R$96,000 in rural areas. In order to reduce the housing deficit, in September 2023, an ordinance was published that exempted beneficiaries of Bolsa Família and the Continuous Installment Benefit from paying installments on properties purchased under the programme.

==== Fight against hunger ====
During his first two governments, Lula prioritized the fight against hunger, as well as extreme poverty and social exclusion as part of his projects, he created several projects such as Fome Zero, which granted him several prizes, such as the World Food Prize by the World Food Prize Foundation in 2011, in recognition of his efforts to combat hunger. In 2014, under Dilma's presidency, Brazil left the ONU Hunger Map, but returned to it in the following years due to the 2014/2020 economic crises and subsequent mass unemployment and bankruptcy, as well as the lack of public policies aimed at the area during the following governments, according to analysts.

On 28 February 2023, Lula reinstalled the National Council for Food and Nutritional Security (Consea), deactivated by Bolsonaro in 2019. On 22 March, Lula relaunched the Programme of Food Acquisition (PAA), whose objective is to guarantee food and nutritional security and encourage the production of food from family farms.

==== Gás do Povo ====
In November 2025, the Gás do Povo program began, replacing Auxílio Gás. The program guarantees the free refill of the LPG cylinder (13 kg) at retailers accredited by the government. The measure aims to promote access to LPG (Liquefied Petroleum Gas), avoiding the use of precarious alternatives such as firewood, charcoal, and kerosene, which can expose families to toxic smoke, chronic respiratory diseases, and the constant danger of burns. The benefit is intended for families registered in the Cadastro Único (CadÚnico), with an income of up to half the minimum wage, with priority given to those who receive Bolsa Família.

Caixa Econômica Federal is responsible for the operationalization of the benefit, being in charge of distributing the refill vouchers, registering participating retailers, and validating the beneficiaries' means of access.

=== Visas ===
Seeking to reverse a policy of Bolsonaro — which, according to the current government, made the decision to "break with the pattern of Brazilian migration policy, historically grounded in the principles of reciprocity and equal treatment" — the government instructed the Itamaraty to once again require visas for entry into Brazil by citizens of Australia, Canada, the United States, and Japan, just as these countries already do when it comes to Brazilian citizens. The decision was taken after consultations with the governments of these four countries regarding the possibility of also exempting Brazilians from visas, in accordance with the principle of reciprocity; a principle that the Ministry of Foreign Affairs had already defended since 2017, when it opposed a proposal by the Ministry of Tourism to permanently remove the visa requirement for these countries. The Itamaraty's decision had also taken into account a decree issued by then president Donald Trump in January 2017, intended to complicate the granting of visas to citizens of several countries, among which Brazil was included.

"Brazil does not grant unilateral exemptions of visitor visas, without reciprocity, to other countries. [...] In attention to the interests of Brazilian citizens, the Brazilian government will be ready to continue negotiating, with the four aforementioned countries, visa waiver agreements on reciprocal bases." — Ministry of Foreign Affairs (Itamaraty).

The return of visa charges was received with criticism by some entities linked to the tourism and hospitality sector. For Feliciano Sá Guimarães, director of the Brazilian Center for International Relations, the measure is an obstacle to the development of national tourism and "a vain retrograde nationalist defense". Although the National Confederation of Tourism (Cntur) "did not view it favorably", Wilson Luis Pinto, executive president of the entity, stated that he believed the government took a calculated measure and that the country would not cease to be an option for foreign travelers. "Whoever decided they want to come here will come." Luis Pinto also expressed support for the proposal: "I, as a Brazilian, do not think it is fair to spend months in line and pay a fee to obtain a visa, while an American can buy a ticket and come to Brazil".

The government assessed that the resumption of visas would have a low impact on tourism and, according to the Polícia Federal, although in 2019 there were some peaks in the entry of people from North America into Brazil after the visa exemption, this number did not show much increase compared to the period before the measure. On the other hand, the number of Japanese tourists declined after the exemption took effect. In addition, citizens of these countries will be allowed to use the electronic visa, which had been in effect before the unilateral exemption.

The reinstatement of the visa requirement for tourists from the aforementioned countries, which was originally to occur starting in October 2023, was initially postponed to January 2024 and then to April 2024. Officially, the government declared that the measure sought not to harm tourism during the high season. In reality, the postponement resulted from the inability of local consulates to deal with the new demand, making it impossible for thousands of American and Canadian tourists to obtain visas in time to travel to Brazil.

In 2024, Brazil reached a historic record in the entry of foreign tourists, with more than 6.6 million international travelers in the country. In 2025, the Brazilian passport ranked 16th among the 20 most powerful in the world according to the American consultancy Henley & Partners, while the international Passport Index ranking placed it 11th.

Between January and September 2025, Brazil reached a historic record of 7 million tourists for the first time. According to Marcelo Freixo, president of Embratur, the record is the result of the government's effort to "rebuild Brazil's image in the world as a destination of diversity and sustainability".

=== Civil servants ===
The government increased by 9%, starting in May 2023, the remuneration of civil servants and civilian public employees of the Federal Executive Branch, with an estimated annual cost of about 14 billion reais, and increased by 200 reais the meal allowance paid to active servants and employees.

Civil servants of the other branches received an increase at a higher rate (18%), staggered in three installments until 2025. The salary cap of the public service became 41,650 reais starting in April 2023, and will be 44,008 reais in February 2024 and 46,366 reais in February 2025.

The federal government also created 665 new commissioned positions, with remuneration of up to 14,849 reais, and 1,578 commissioned functions, with compensation of up to 8,909 reais. Commissioned positions do not need to be occupied by career civil servants, unlike commissioned functions, which can only be occupied by those who are already public servants and which add the value of the function's compensation to the remuneration.

The Concurso Público Nacional Unificado (CPNU), also called the Concurso Nacional Unificado (CNU), is an initiative of the Ministry of Management and Innovation in Public Services (MGI) of the Federal government of Brazil to centralize and streamline the process of hiring new federal civil servants.

=== Education and research ===
"People have to know that investment in education is the best and cheapest investment a state can make"

— Lula

On 2 January, Lula revoked a bill made during the Bolsonaro government, which created schools exclusively for persons with disabilities, with the revocation of this law, these students are now able to study in the same schools as other students, while keeping the need for special treatment in some severe cases. On 11 January, Lula signed in a bill called the "National Digital Education Policy", which deals with expanding access to digital education in the country.

Another measure taken by the government was the increase in the amount for research grants, Lula later stated that "this government is forbidden to treat [as] wasted money what goes to education, money that goes to scholarships, money that goes to healthcare and research".

On 10 March, Lula announced a readjustment in the values of the school meals of public schools, after having been frozen for more than five years. The increase is 39% and the value is 5.5 billion per year. In April, after severe pressure from Student and Teacher unions, the Ministry of Education announced the temporary suspension of the "New High School" programme, however, there was no revocation of the project, and it would later be reinstated in August by Minister of Education Camilo Santana, although with some changes.

Also in April, Lula announced that the government would invest over 6 billion in a project to restart the construction of several works in the education area, such as public schools. On July, the Ministry of Education announced that the federal programme for creation of civic-military schools would be stopped, and that each state would have the option to keep or extinguish the programme. On the same month, Lula also signed in the Education Ministry's "full-time school program" after modifications to the original project, which dealt with increasing government investments in these schools, as well as reforming many part-time ones to also allow for the offering of these options, were approved by the Chamber of Deputies.

On 6 November 2023, education minister Camilo Santana announced that people with FIES debts could now renegotiate them with the federal government, the attitude is similar to the Desenrola Brasil programme, also created during the Lula government in an effort to reduce indebtedness among the people, especially those of lower classes.

The government announced on 12 March 2024 the construction of 100 new Federal Institutes of Education, Science and Technology in all federative units in Brazil by 2026. The ministry of education announced that it would be Investing ~R$3.9 billion in the construction of these units, with the funds being made possible through the New PAC. The government estimates the creation of 140 thousand new enrollments, the majority in technical courses integrated into secondary education (high school). The region that will receive the most Institutes will be the Northeast, with 38 new units planned, while the State that will receive the largest number of Institutes will be São Paulo, with 12 new units.

==== Pé de Meia ====
On 16 January 2024, Lula sanctioned the Pé de Meia programme, which provides the payment of a monthly financial incentive to high school students, encouraging them to continue studying until completing basic education. The programme aims to contain school evasion or dropouts, which had doubled during the pandemic, and will target students from low-income families registered in CadÚnico, with a per capita family income of up to 218 reais per month. Coming into effect on 26 January 2024, the value of the programme was R$2,000 annually, R$200 upon registration, plus 9 payments of R$200 per school month. In December 2024, the Brazilian Federal Court of Accounts asked for the programme to be blocked after an audit found that the programme was not financially viable.

==== More Teachers ====
In January 2025, the "More Teachers" program was launched with the aim of increasing the presence of teachers in regions farther from the country's main urban centers. The program provides monthly scholarships of 2,100 reais to teachers with specific training who work in regions with a greater shortage of professionals, such as in the areas of physics, mathematics and biology. The program includes integrated actions to strengthen teacher training, encourage entry into public teaching, and enhance the professional recognition of educators. A National Teacher Examination will be implemented to assist states, the Federal District and municipalities in recruitment and hiring processes for teaching positions, and the Pé-de-Meia Licensure Scholarship will aim to promote entry into, retention in and completion of teacher training courses.

==== National Strategy for Connected Schools ====
In September 2023, the government launched the National Strategy for Connected Schools (ENEC). The program is structured around four main connectivity pillars: deployment of high-speed internet access infrastructure; provision of adequate internet connectivity; installation of Wi-Fi networks in schools; and supply of electrical power. ENEC will receive investments of 8.8 billion reais, of which 6.5 billion reais come from the “Digital Inclusion and Connectivity” axis of the New PAC. Funding comes from four sources: the 5G auction, the Universal Service Fund for Telecommunications (Fust), the Connected Education Innovation Program (PIEC) and Law No. 14,172 of 2021.

=== Science and technology ===
The National Science and Technology Council (CCT) and the National Fund for Scientific and Technological Development were also restructured, with the Minister of Science, Technology and Innovation Luciana Santos saying that the government would increase investments in that area. On 16 February, Lula announced yet another readjustment in the value of scholarships during an event in the Planalto Palace. and stated that "in this government it is forbidden to treat money that goes to education, scholarships, or healthcare as an expense." He later restructured the National Council for Science and Technology (CCT) and restored the National Fund for Scientific and Technological Development (FNDCT). The minister of science, technology and innovation, Luciana Santos, stated that investment in the area is a priority for the government.

==== TV 3.0 ====
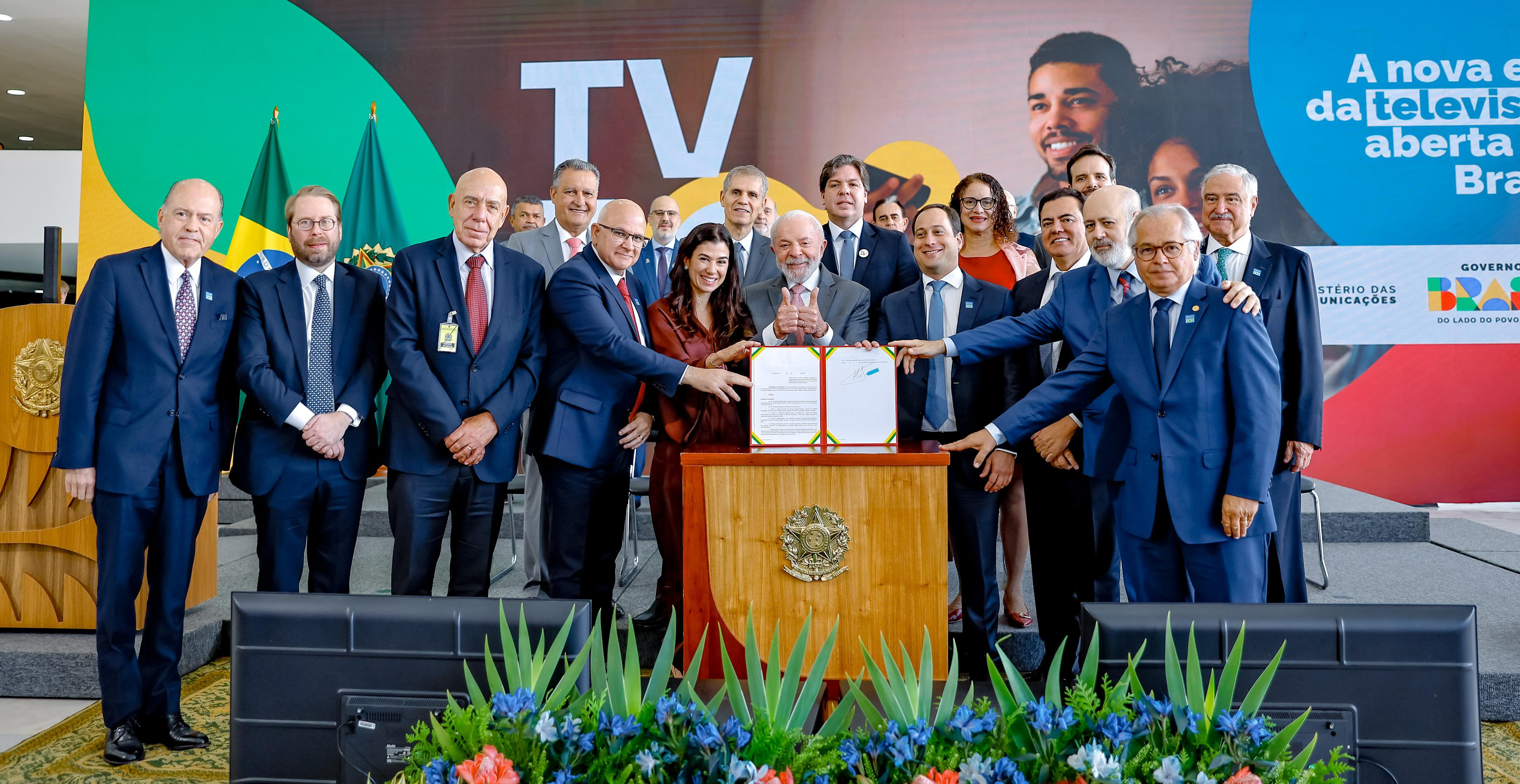
President Lula during the ceremony signing the decree implementing TV 3.0 at the Palácio do Planalto, in August 2025.

On 27 August 2025, President Luiz Inácio Lula da Silva signed Decree No. 12,595/2025, establishing the DTV+ system (also called TV 3.0) as the new standard for Brazilian free-to-air television, based on ATSC 3.0. The standard covers physical, transport, video, audio, subtitles and emergency alert layers. The preparatory phase is expected to be completed in 2025, with the first TV 3.0 transmissions beginning in the first half of 2026 in major capitals. The expansion process to reach coverage across the entire national territory is estimated to take up to 15 years. The system also incorporates internet integration, greater interactivity, accessibility and public services via the television platform. The signing of the decree followed years of studies, research, discussions and debates led by the MCom, involving companies in the sector, academics and specialists. Following the regulation, Brazilian broadcasters may begin implementing the new system.

According to the minister of communications, Frederico Siqueira, the signing of the decree marked a historic moment for Brazil, strengthening free-to-air television as a democratic and popular meeting space. He highlighted that TV 3.0 will not change a central principle: free access. The new technology will modernize Brazilian digital television, offering 4K and 8K images, immersive sound, greater interactivity and integration with the internet. The goal is to provide a richer and more personalized experience for viewers, bringing free-to-air television closer to streaming services.

=== Healthcare ===
On 11 January, Lula signed into law the "National Policy for the Prevention of Self-Mutilation and Suicide", created by the Health Ministry with the objective of giving mental health support for public security agents.

On 20 January, Lula signed a bill, classifying community and disease control agents as health professionals. Also on 20 January, under pressure from religious entities, Lula created the "Department of Support for Therapeutic Communities", aimed at treating drug addicts; after the measure was criticized by human rights organizations, the Ministry of Social Development and Fight against Hunger announced that it would review the decision. The Brazilian Association of Mental Health had also spoken out against the measure in a repudiation note.

On 8 March, International Women's Day, Lula announced the creation of the "Programme for the Protection and Promotion of Menstrual Dignity", which provides distribution of menstrual pads by the Sistema Único de Saúde (SUS) to people in vulnerable situations, below the Poverty threshold. The document regulates the Law nº 14.214/2021, which had been vetoed by Jair Bolsonaro in 2021. 8 million people will benefit from the initiative, according to specialists, with an investment of 418 million reals per year, according to the Ministry of Health.

On 20 March, Lula and health minister, Nísia Trindade, announced the re-creation of the Mais Médicos programme, first created in 2013 with the purpose of expanding the number of health professionals in less economically developed areas and in the interior of the country. The programme had been partially replaced by Bolsonaro's "Doctors for Brazil"; the "Mais Médicos para o Brasil", as it is now called, should prioritize Brazilian professionals and, according to Paulo Pimenta, chief minister of the Secretary of Social Communication, increase the number of health professionals and improve the Sistema Único de Saúde (SUS).

==== Dengue vaccine ====
In December 2023, Nine months after Anvisa's approval, which took place in March 2023, the Health Ministry purchased and incorporated a dengue vaccine into Brazil's public healthcare system (SUS), becoming the first country in the world to do so. Nine months after approval by Anvisa in March 2023, the Ministry of Health announced, in December of that year, that Brazil would include in the national immunization program, starting in 2024, the dengue vaccine developed by the pharmaceutical company Takeda. Vaccinations through the National Immunization Programme began in 2024. However, the quantity of doses initially made available by the SUS was small, being intended only for children and adolescents between 10 and 14 years of age living in about 10% of the country's municipalities. The vaccine could be administered by the private network from the time of Anvisa's approval.

=== Public security ===
The Federal Government presented a proposed constitutional amendment (PEC) aimed at modernizing and integrating public security in the country. The initiative, led by the ministry of justice and public security, Ricardo Lewandowski, seeks to strengthen the fight against organized crime and improve cooperation among the Union, states and municipalities. Among the main points are the creation of a Unified Public Security System (SUSP) with constitutional status, the expansion of the responsibilities of the Federal Police and the Federal Highway Police – which would be renamed the Federal Ostensive Police – and the consolidation of permanent financial instruments, such as the National Public Security and Penitentiary Policy Fund, guaranteeing stable resources for the sector.

The government argues that the proposal does not remove the autonomy of the states, but seeks to promote greater coordination and efficiency in police action, especially in the face of the advance of criminal factions operating beyond state borders. Even so, the text faces resistance from sectors of the right and the opposition. Despite the criticism, the Ministry of Justice states that the proposal was built in dialogue with governors and specialists, and that it represents an effort to make the fight against crime more integrated, technological and effective throughout the national territory.

=== Infrastructure ===
==== Energy ====
The Lula government inaugurated, on 22 March, the first hybrid Renewable energy park in the country authorized by the National Electric Energy Agency (Aneel): the "Neo-energy Renewable Complex – Fountain Wind Farm", which consists of renewable Wind power and solar energy, located in Santa Luzia, Paraíba.

In a meeting with the Minister of Mines and Energy, Alexandre Silveira, Lula showed support for the use of electricity derived from renewable sources, in particular for reducing the cost of the service, especially for the poor; goals were also discussed to place Brazil in a "leading global position in the generation of clean energy", in addition to encouraging more sustainable public transport.

==== Transport ====
===== Aerial transport =====
Despite normally being categorized as centre-left, the Lula government continued with the privatization of elements of the Brazilian infrastructure, such as in May 2023, when it carried out the auction of the Natal International Airport through its Ministry of Ports and Airports, which resulted in the purchase of this airfield by the Swiss state-owned company Flughafen Zürich AG (Zurich Airport Ltd.)

By decision of the Ministry of Ports and Airports, in August 2023, flights arriving and departing from Santos Dumont airport were restricted from 2024, which could only occur with origin or destination up to 400 kilometers away. it limited, in practice, flights from the airport between Rio de Janeiro, São Paulo and Belo Horizonte; the measure sought to divert part of the flights to the Galeão International Airport, managed by the company RIOgaleão, controlled by the Changi Group, from Singapore; however, the decision was revised in November, exchanging the distance restriction for a restriction on passenger volume, which will be limited to 6.5 million per year.

===== Rail transport =====
The government intends to start a new wave of investment in the expansion of the Brazilian railway network, with the strategy being to increase investments in railway lines led by the ministry of transport; within the New PAC, the government intends to invest R$94.2 billion in 35 projects, R$55.1 billion by 2026 and more $39.1 billion in subsequent years, the majority of the investments will be through the private sector. The focus, this time, will be the passenger transport, the newspaper Poder360 found that there are 7 most advanced passenger train projects, stretches averaging 100 km connecting municipalities and metropolitan regions, among these, the longest would be the one that connects Fortaleza with Sobral, in Ceará, a stretch of more than 200 km, the others would be in the states of Maranhão, Bahia, Rio de Janeiro, Paraná, Rio Grande do Sul and the Federal District. Currently, there are only two regular passenger lines: between Vitória and Belo Horizonte, and between São Luís and Parauapebas (PA), both are also used to transport cargo; for the construction of these lines, the government sees it as essential to take advantage of the existing railway infrastructure, aimed at transporting cargo, but which is underutilized or in a precarious state of maintenance.

==== São Francisco River transposition and water infrastructure ====
On 9 February 2022, water from the São Francisco River transposition project reached Jardim de Piranhas in the state of Rio Grande do Norte, in the Seridó region. However, the flow lasted only 15 days, as the transposition structures had not yet been completed. Only on 13 August 2025 did the waters of the São Francisco transposition reach Rio Grande do Norte without interruption, following the completion of the works. In the state, the water flows through the bed of the Piranhas–Açu River toward the Oiticica Dam in Jucurutu and the Armando Ribeiro Gonçalves Dam between the municipalities of Açu, Itajá and São Rafael.

In May 2025, a service order was signed to double the water pumping capacity across the entire Northern Axis at the pumping stations EBI1 in Cabrobó (Pernambuco), EBI2 in Terra Nova (Pernambuco), and EBI3 in Salgueiro (Pernambuco). The flow is expected to increase from 24.75 m^{3}/s to 49 m^{3}/s, benefiting 237 municipalities and about 8.1 million people in the states of Ceará, Pernambuco, Paraíba and Rio Grande do Norte. The project is expected to cost 491.3 million reais and to be completed in 2027.

The government has also supported works on the Apodi branch in Rio Grande do Norte and the Salgado branch in Ceará, parts of the original PISF project, scheduled for completion in 2026 and 2027, as well as the Adutora da Fé in Bahia and the Canal do Sertão Baiano. In addition, state projects such as the Cinturão das Águas do Ceará, the Eixão das Águas (Ceará), the Seridó Norte water pipeline, the Agreste Potiguar water pipeline, the Vertentes Litorâneas da Paraíba, the Agreste Pernambucano water pipeline and the Canal do Sertão Alagoano have received federal funding for their development.

==== New driver's license system ====
The National Traffic Council (Contran) approved a resolution in December 2025 ending the requirement that all theoretical and practical classes for obtaining a Brazilian driver's license (CNH) in categories A (motorcycles) and B (cars) must be taken exclusively at driving schools (CFC).

The government will provide a free digital theoretical course. Practical lessons may be conducted with accredited independent instructors, including using a personal vehicle, or at driving schools. The minimum duration of lessons has been reduced from 25 hours to 2 hours. Biometric registration, theoretical and practical examinations, and medical tests remain mandatory. The reduction in costs is estimated at 70%.

The Brazilian Manual of Driving Examinations was updated with unified guidelines for driving tests nationwide, eliminating parallel parking as a mandatory stage and revising the criteria for approval and failure. Each infraction now receives a specific score, and candidates are approved only if they do not exceed a limit of 10 points. The rule of a single infraction leading to immediate failure was eliminated.

Beginning in January 2026, automatic and free license renewal was introduced for drivers considered to have a good record—those who have no points on their license in the previous 12 months, no recorded traffic infractions in that period, and who are registered in the National Positive Drivers Registry (RNPC). Drivers over the age of 70 are not eligible for automatic renewal, and drivers over 50 may renew automatically only once.

==== Growth Acceleration Programme ====
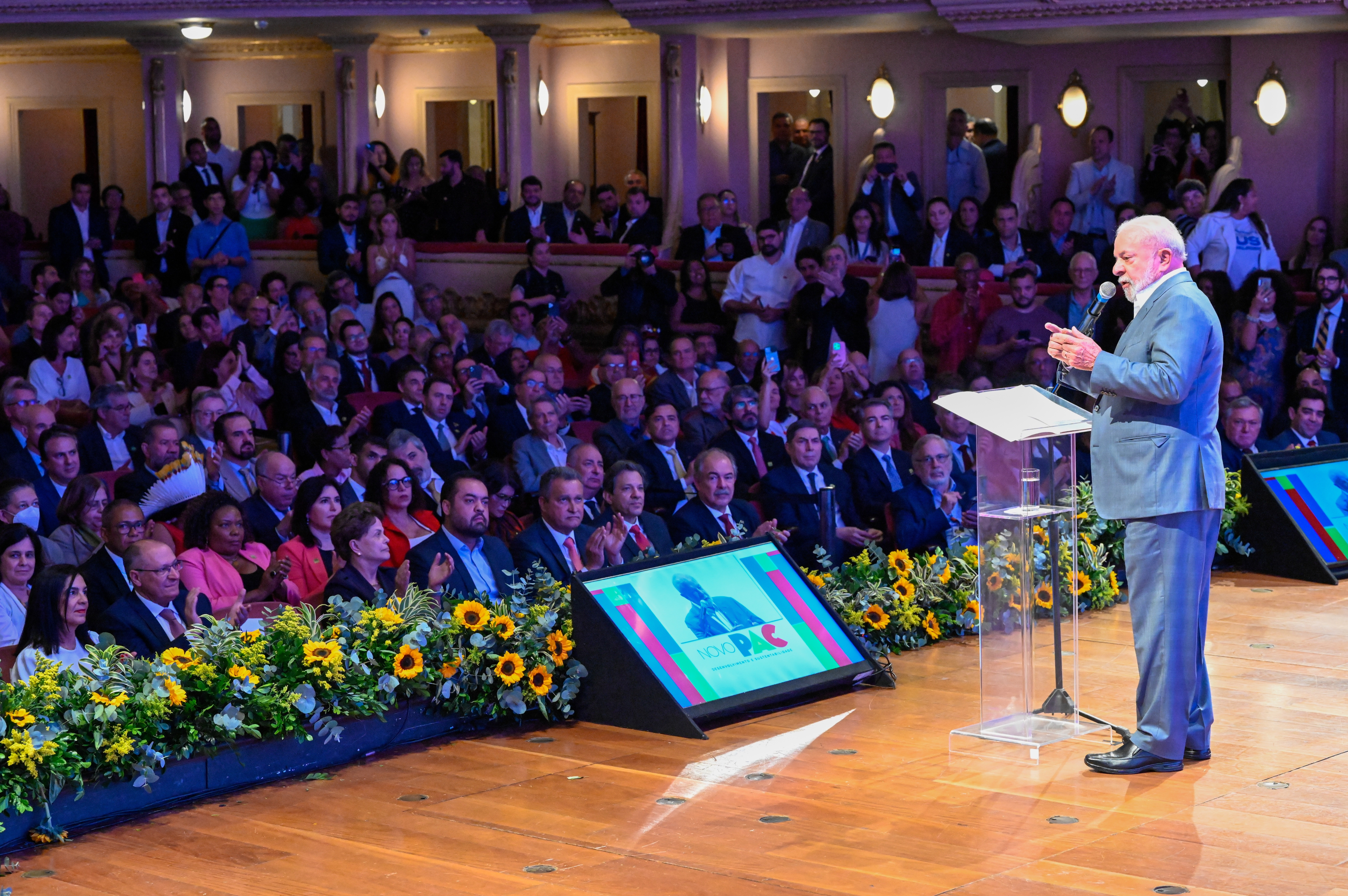
Lula during the announcement of the new Growth Acceleration Programme at the Municipal Theater of Rio de Janeiro, August 2023

On 11 August, Lula and ministers unveiled a new Growth Acceleration Programme, according to the proposal, an estimated 1.7 trillion reais (worth around US$350 billion at the time) will be spent over the following 4 years. Of this, 610 billion is expected to be spent on slum urbanisation programmes, including the development of housing, public transport, sanitation, energy and protection from natural disasters, this includes further investments on social infrastructure programmes such as Minha Casa, Minha Vida, Luz Para Todos and Água Para Todos, as well as creation and expansion of ports, airports, motorways and railways. 540 billion is expected to be spent on expanding the electric grid and petrochemical industries, with 80% of the newly developed electric production capacity being expected to come from renewable sources; 349 billion is expected to be spent on transportation infrastructure, including for motor vehicles, trains, marine vehicles, and aeroplanes.

Lula also announced the construction of the "West-East Integration Railway (FIOL)" as the first project of the programme, which will connect the southwest of Bahia to the coast of southern Bahia. Other areas of investment include "digital inclusion and connectivity" (expansion of 4G and 5G networks and digital education), healthcare (construction of new basic health units and maternities, as well purchase of ambulances and vaccines), education (construction, expansion and modernization of day care centers, full-time schools and federal institutes and universities) and defence infrastructure. The programme is also expected to create over 4 million jobs in the next 4 years (2.5 million direct jobs and 1.5 million indirect jobs).

Some economists have criticised the plan, citing Brazil's poor track record of investment quality and worries regarding fiscal responsibility. Of the energy investments, 343 billion will be made through Petrobras, a state-owned corporation notable for its involvement in a corruption scandal during Lula's previous presidency.

=== Environment ===
Deforestation in the Brazilian Amazon rainforest fell 61% in January 2023 from a year earlier following a series of anti-logging and anti-mining operations launched by government agencies under Lula, according to satellite data.

In June 2023, the Environment Ministry announced a plan to curb deforestation in Brazil's Legal Amazon, and immediately embargoed all activities being developed inside conservation parks in the region. Additionally, the government announced the creation of 3 million hectares (7,413,161.44 acres) in protected areas until 2027/ the creation of tracking system using geopositioning for Amazon agricultural products and ecolabels were announced as well.

In July 2023, deforestation in the Brazilian Amazon was reported to have fallen 34% over the previous six months while deforestation in the Brazilian Atlantic forest dropped 42% from January to May 2023 comparatively to the same period of time in 2022. In November 2023, Brazil's National Institute for Space Research (INPE) reported that the Amazon deforestation rate fell 22% between August 2022 and July 2023, compared to its previous 2021–2022 report (during Jair Bolsonaro's presidency). Considering only the period of the Lula government, the drop is accentuated to 49.7% compared to the same period of the previous year. Deforestation in protected areas fell the most, being the lowest in 9 years. In total, Imazon highlighted that 2023 had the lowest deforestation rate since 2017.

In 2024, the National Institute for Space Research (INPE) identified a 100% increase in the number of fires compared to the same period in 2023, with 50% of these fires recorded in the Amazon, and 32% in the Cerrado. In October 2024, MapBiomas and Amazon Environmental Research Institute (IPAM) reported that the burned area was 150% larger than in 2023, equivalent to the size of the state of Roraima, through the MapBiomas Fire Monitor. According to the Copernicus Programme, Brazil broke a record for carbon emissions, releasing 180 megatonnes of carbon into the atmosphere, largely due to the increase in fires, bringing it close to that recorded in 2007, when the country broke the previous record, with the states of Amazonas and Mato Grosso being the biggest emitters. According to INPE, in 2024, Brazil had the highest number of fires of the century.

=== Human rights ===
==== Women's rights ====
"[We are doing] what was lacking from the previous government, when it chose to destroy public policies, cut essential budgetary resources and even encouraged violence against women. I am pleased to tell you that Brazil has finally returned. returned to fight discrimination, sexual harassment, rape, femicide and all forms of violence against women".

— Lula

To guarantee policies that secure women's rights, the Lula government created, on 8 March, the International Women's Day, numerous actions and measures for this purpose. One of the measures was the Equal Pay Bill, which requires companies to be more transparent and strengthen inspection and combat wage discrimination between women and men.

On 4 April, Lula decreed that Women's police stations would be open 24/7, even on holidays; another measure was also made, with the objective of fighting sexual harassment in public agencies and private institutions that provide services to the government.

==== Racial equality ====
On 6 January, Lula signed into law a bill creating the Day of the Traditional African religions. Later, on 11 January, Lula signed in a bill that equalized the crime of "racial injury" to racism.

On 21 March, the National Day to Combat Racial Discrimination, Lula signed the Racial Equality Bill, made up of seven measures, among which is the "Aquilomba Brasil" programme and the goal of having black people in at least 30% of commissioned positions and functions. On 21 December 2023, Lula sanctioned a bill approved in the deputies' chamber that turned the "Dia Nacional do Zumbi e da consciência negra" (black consciousness day) into a national holiday.

==== Indigenous affairs ====
Upon taking office, Lula also issued the Provisional measure No. 1,154, of 1 January 2023, which created the Ministry of Indigenous People, and also renamed the Fundação Nacional do Índio ("National Indian Foundation, FUNAI") to Fundação Nacional dos Povos Indígenas ("National Indigenous People Foundation"), in addition to linking this foundation authority to the newly created ministry (it was previously linked to the Ministry of Agriculture). He appointed Sônia Guajajara as Indigenous minister, and Joenia Wapichana to head FUNAI, being the first indigenous women to head such offices.

On 3 January 2023, Joenia Wapichana announced the creation of several working groups to resume the demarcation of indigenous lands that had been paralyzed in the previous years (such as the Jeju and Areal Indigenous Lands in Pará, Tekoha Porã, Karugwá and Pyhaú lands in São Paulo, Ka'aguy Poty in Rio Grande do Sul, Cambirela in Santa Catarina, Passo Piraju/Nu Porã in Mato Grosso do Sul and the area claimed by the Mukurin people in Minas Gerais), in addition to establishing new groups (for the Aranã and Aranã Caboclo Índio indigenous lands in Minas Gerais and the areas claimed by the Cassupá and Salamãi ethnic groups in Rondônia).

Other measures included shifting the National Council of Traditional Peoples and Communities (CNPCT) from the Ministry of Human Rights and Citizenship to the Ministry of Environment and Climate Change, as well as the establishment of the "National Secretariat for Traditional Peoples and Communities and Sustainable Rural Development" under the same ministry.

===== Yanomami crisis =====
On 20 January, the Brazilian Ministry of Health declared a national emergency following reports of deaths among Yamomami children due to malnutrition and easily curable diseases. The president of the FUNAI also led the creation of a task force to deal with the humanitarian crisis. Between 2019 and 2023, at least of 570 Yanomami children died from malnutrition, hunger and mercury contamination.

Lula accused Jair Bolsonaro's government of having committed genocide against the Yanomami, several researchers blamed the entry of illegal miners into protected native lands for the high amount of deaths between the local indigenous peoples, as well as alleged connivance and omission of the federal and local/state administrations during the previous government.

Due to the high number of deaths since 2023, reports on the situation decreased, until they stopped being published at the beginning of 2024, when there was a further increase in deaths due to violence.

==== LGBT rights ====
On 7 April 2023, Lula re-established the National Council for LGBTQIA+ Rights, a 38-member body of advisors charged with proposing policies and supporting campaigns aimed towards support for the LGBTQIA+ community in Brazil. The Ministry of Human Rights and Citizenship will be charged with funding for the council. The body previously existed from 2010 until the Bolsonaro presidency.

== Foreign affairs ==
Lula stated during the 2022 election campaign and after taking office that his government will consistently focus on to "bring back Brazil to the world stage", meaning the country will seek to rebuild ties cut or damaged during Bolsonaro's presidency, and expand its foreign relations worldwide. On 9 December 2022 Lula announced that to head the Ministry of Foreign Affairs (Itamaraty) he had chosen Brazilian ambassador, career diplomat and former foreign minister Mauro Vieira. As an effort to empower women diplomats, he picked ambassador and career diplomat Maria Laura da Rocha as Itamaraty's deputy foreign minister and Maria Luiza Ribeiro Viotti as Brazil's ambassador to the US, both the first women to ever hold those positions. More women are also expected to be appointed to top positions.

=== Americas ===
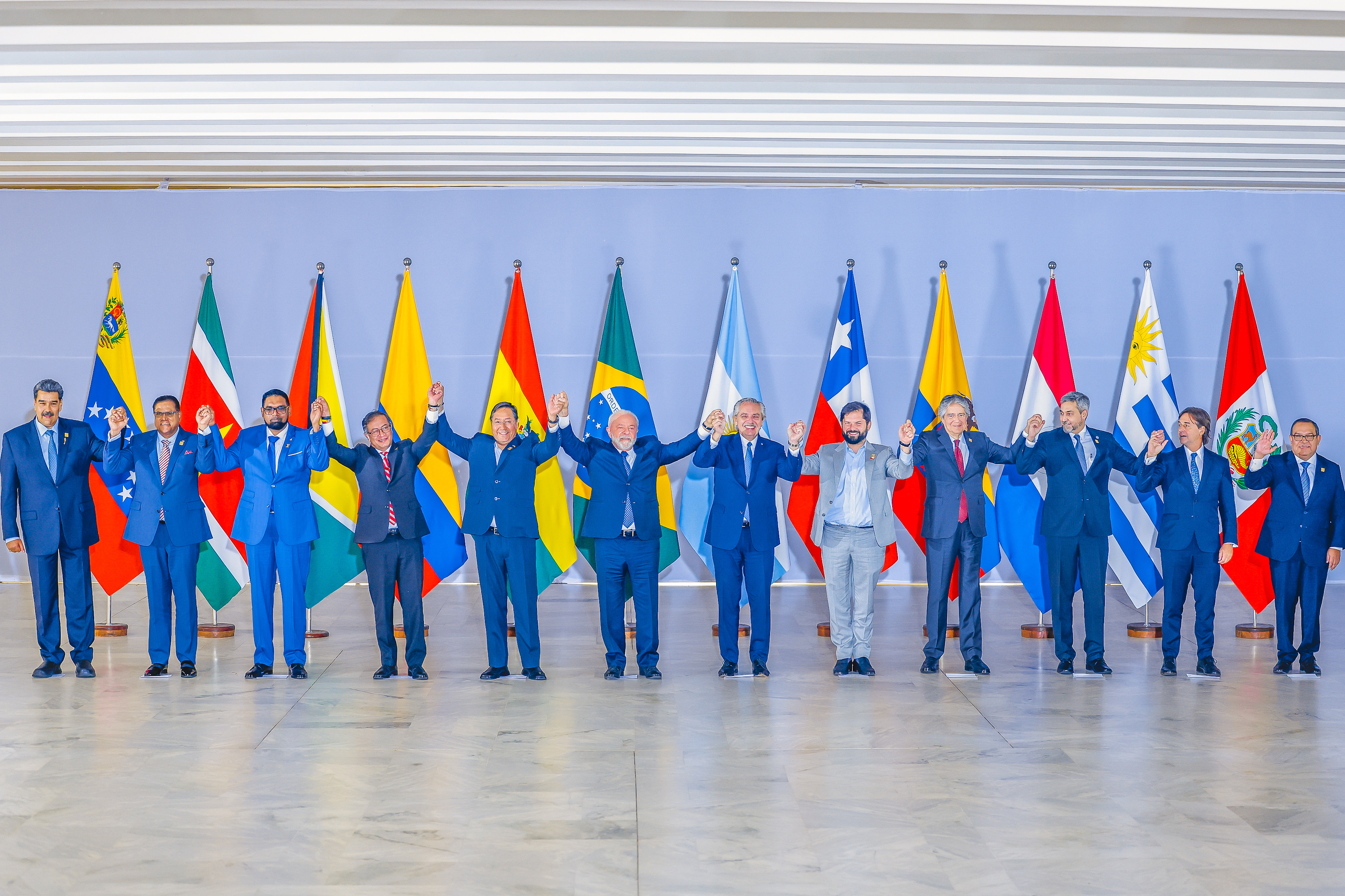
Lula and other South American presidents during the 2023 South American summit in May 2023, in Brasília, Brazil

==== South America ====
In May 2023, Brazil hosted the South American Summit, attended by Lula and leaders of all South American nations, including Guyanese president Irfaan Ali, Surinamese president Chan Santokhi and Ecuadorian president Guillermo Lasso. The initiative aimed to seek regional cooperation in South America and address topics such as energy, finance, climate change and crime.

===== Argentina =====
====== Under Fernández ======
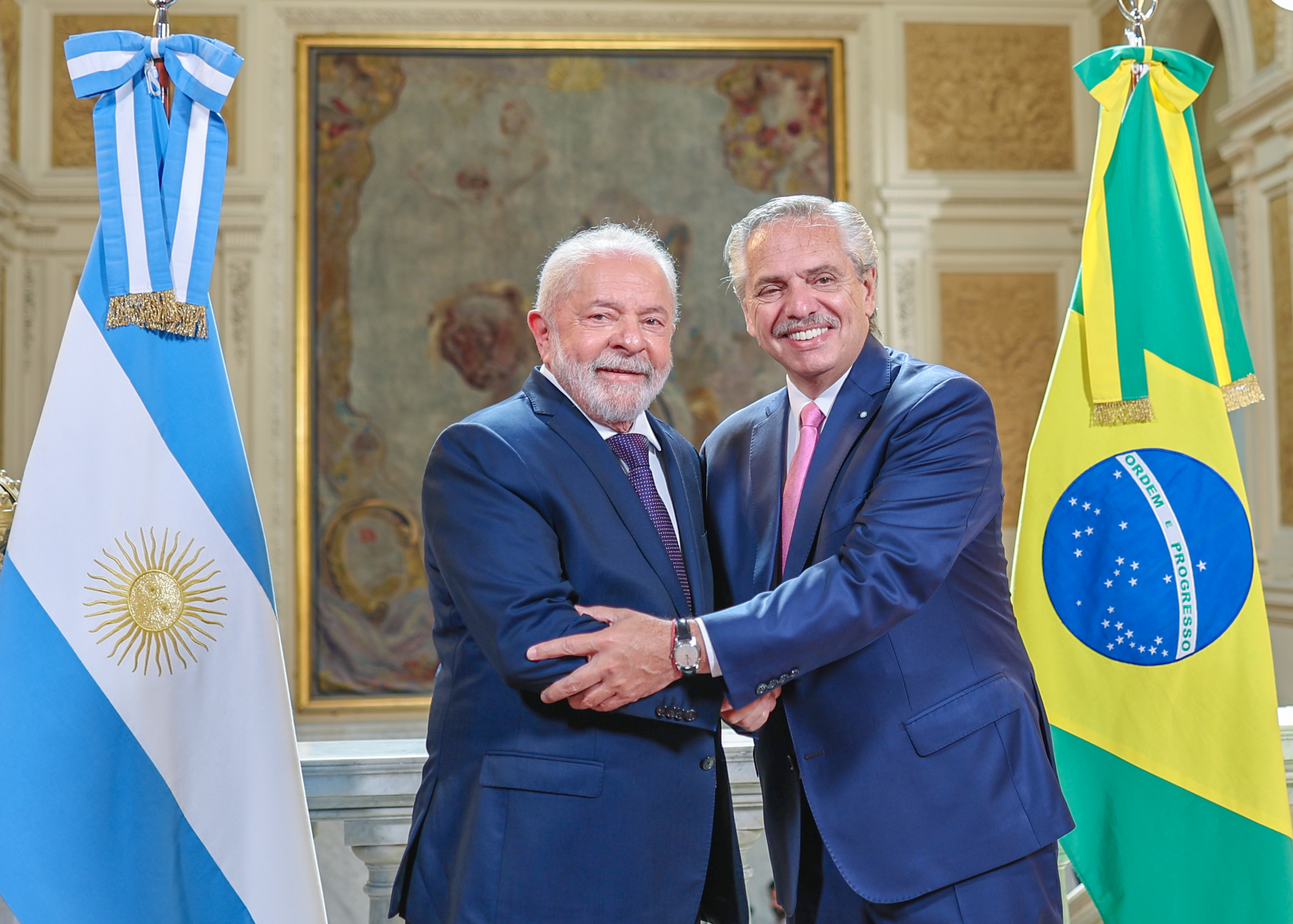
Lula and Fernández in the Casa Rosada, Buenos Aires on 23 January 2023

After assuming the presidency, Lula made his first international trip as president to Buenos Aires, where he announced that Brazil would resume its relations with Latin America and that the government would be willing to finance infrastructure works in neighbouring countries through the BNDES again. Lula also defended the construction of a gas pipeline between Brazil and Argentina to transport the shale gas extracted in the Vaca Muerta field. The idea was criticized by some experts, as the project may cause damage to the region's environment. The announcement also generated several criticisms from economists, as this practice has already caused the country to suffer from defaults in the past.

In May 2023, Lula and Argentine president Alberto Fernández – a Peronist and Lula ally who while still a candidate had visited Lula in prison – in Brasília to discuss the economic crisis in Argentina as well as trade and energy between Argentina and Brazil. Lula stated that he has committed to make "each and every sacrifice so we can help Argentina in those hard times" including reaching out to both the IMF and the BRICS and that he will back up Brazilian exporters operating in the country.

Lula welcomed Fernández in Brasília in June 2023 to celebrate the 200th anniversary of the establishment of diplomatic relations between Brazil and Argentina during which Fernández was rewarded with Brazil's highest award the Order of the Southern Cross. Lula said Brazil and Argentina were looking into a broad line of credit for Brazilian companies and workers in Argentina and the creation of a trade coin between both nations.

====== Under Milei ======
Fernández had in April 2023 announced that he, despite being eligible for a second, would not seek re-election. The Lula government openly supported the candidacy of governing coalition Sergio Massa, defeated in the second round by the libertarian Javier Milei, who during the campaign referred to Lula as "communist" and "corrupt". Lula did not call to congratulate Milei, limiting himself to publishing a protocol message on social media in which the Milei's name was absent.

The minister of the Secretariat of Social Communication, Paulo Pimenta, suggested that only after Milei "calls to apologize" would there be dialogue between him and Lula. Days after the victory, Milei sent a letter to Lula, received by Mauro Vieira, in which Milei deviated from his harsh campaign rhetoric and invited Lula to his inauguration. Despite this, Lula did not participate, acting in the same way as Bolsonaro in 2019, who campaigned against Fernández, sending diplomat Mauro Vieira.

===== Chile =====
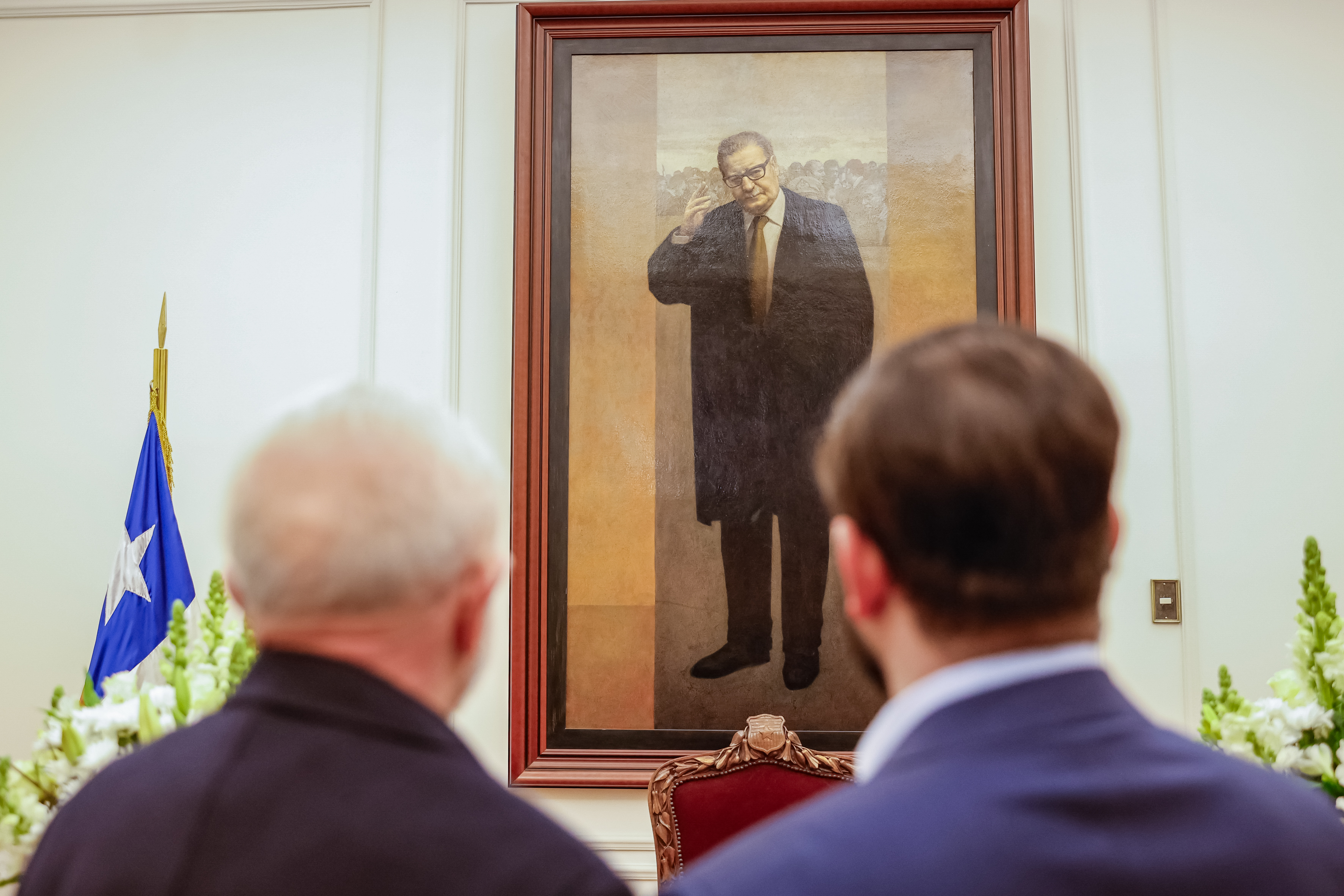
Lula and Chilean president Gabriel Boric stand in front of a portrait of former Chilean president Salvador Allende in August 2024 at La Moneda Palace.

On 5 August 2024, Lula made a state visit to Chile where he separately met with president Gabriel Boric, Chile's Supreme Court chief justice Ricardo Blanco Herrera as well as Chile's Senate president José García Ruminot and House Speaker Karol Cariola. During the visit Lula and Boric signed a total of 19 treaties regarding tourism, space cooperation, mutual recognition for driver's licenses and extradition among other things. A group of 250 Brazilian business people accompanied Lula during the events.

===== Colombia =====
In July 2023, Lula and Colombian president Gustavo Petro met in Leticia to discuss the details of an Amazon Cooperation Treaty Organization (ACTO) summit scheduled to take place a month later. Both presidents also discussed trade and defence between Colombia and Brazil.

In April 2024, Lula visited Colombia and opened the 2024 Bogota International Book Fair alongside president Gustavo Petro. The two countries later signed six cooperation agreements regarding several topics including human trafficking. Lula and Petro also discussed the crisis in Venezuela.

===== Cuba =====
On 15 September, Lula and four of his cabinet minister visited Cuba where they met with Cuban president and first secretary of the Communist Party of Cuba Miguel Díaz-Canel. During his visit, Lula also attended a summit of the Group of 77 plus China in Havana where he lamented the United States embargo against Cuba stating that the island "is the victim of an illegal economic embargo, Brazil is against any unilateral coercive measure". Lula also criticized the inclusion of Cuba in the US list of states sponsors of terrorism.

===== Guyana =====
In February 2024, president Lula announced he would visit Guyana and meet president Irfaan Ali to discuss topics such as the Essequiba border dispute with Venezuela and a potential hydro-power energy sharing agreement between Guyana and Brazil. On 28 February, Lula spoke at a CARICOM summit in Georgetown in which he said he intends Brazil to resume having diplomatic missions in the Caribbean nations. Lula added Brazil was making a monetary contribution to the Caribbean Development Bank.

===== Peru =====
In October 2024, Lula confirmed he'll attend the APEC Summit in Peru.

===== Uruguay =====
In December 2024, Lula visited Uruguay to attend a Mercosur summit that culminated in the signing of the EU–Mercosur Association Agreement. He also met with former Uruguayan former president José Mujica, whom he decorated with the Order of the Southern Cross, Brazil's highest award, and president-elect Yamandú Orsi.

===== Venezuela =====
In May 2023, ahead of a South American summit to which all the presidents of the region were invited, Lula met with Venezuelan president Nicolás Maduro and stated that "you know the narrative that was built against Venezuela, of anti-democracy, of authoritarianism" and "it is in your hands, comrade, to build your narrative and turn this party around so that we can definitively win and Venezuela becomes a sovereign country again where only its people, through a free vote, say who will govern". Chilean president Gabriel Boric and Uruguayan president Luis Lacalle Pou, who were some of the summit attendees, disapproved of Lula's comments.

====== Guyana–Venezuela crisis ======
After a diplomatic crisis started between Venezuela and Guyana (both Brazilian neighbours) in October 2023, President Lula tried to mediate a de-escalation while stating that "we do not want and we do not need a war in South America". Officials from Brazil, along with those from the CARICOM, Colombia, the United Nations and the CELAC attended a meeting between Venezuelan and Guyanese presidents in December 2023 to ease tensions between the nations. Brazil offered to host further talks to promote peace in the region, which was agreed by the two countries, and a meeting between Venezuelan and Guyanese Foreign Ministers took place on 25 January 2024, with both parties pledging to keep the peace and hold further talks.

==== North America ====
===== Mexico =====
In March 2023, Brazilian presidential office said Mexican president Andres Manuel Lopez Obrador invited Lula to visit Mexico and discuss expanding economic cooperation between Mexico and Brazil including the removal of trade tariffs between their countries.

In September 2024, Lula visited Mexico and separately met with President Andrés Manuel López Obrador and president-elect Claudia Sheinbaum. He later attended Sheinbaum's inauguration and joined the Brazilian-Mexican business forum which 400 business people attended.

===== United States =====
====== Under Biden ======
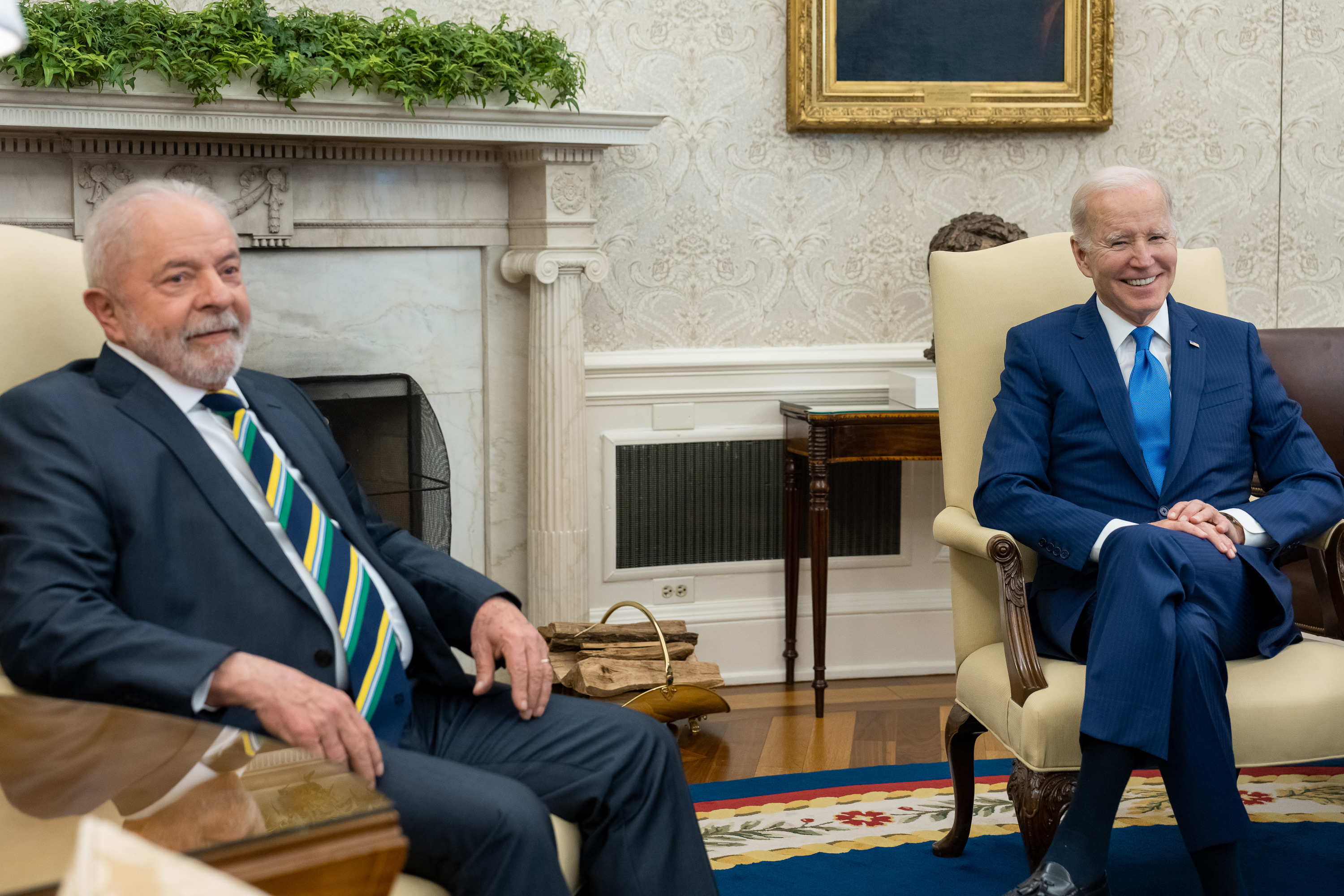
President Lula and US President Joe Biden at the White House on 10 February 2023

In January 2023, US president Joe Biden invited Lula to meet him in Washington, D.C., in February 2023 following a phone conversation between them on the 2023 Brazilian Congress attack. White House press secretary Karine Jean-Pierre confirmed the meeting adding that it would address "U.S. support of Brazil's democracy and how the two countries can continue to work together to promote inclusion and democratic values in the region and around the world". Climate change, migration, economic development and security matters were also discussed.

In February 2023, Lula and a delegation including his Foreign Affairs special advisor Celso Amorim, Foreign minister Mauro Vieira, Finance minister Fernando Haddad, Racial Equality minister Anielle Franco, Environment e Climate Justice minister Marina Silva travelled to the US. During the trip Lula met with US Senator Bernie Sanders, Democratic House Representatives Alexandria Ocasio-Cortez, Pramila Jayapal, Sheila Jackson Lee, Brad Sherman and Ro Khanna before he met with US president Joe Biden at the White House. On 10 February, at a meeting with American president Joe Biden, Lula proposed the creation of a group of negotiators made up of countries "not involved in the war" (either directly or indirectly, i.e. by sending weapons to one of the sides) between Russia and Ukraine to negotiate an end to the conflict and invited the US to join Brazil in a new global climate governance On 28 February, Brazilian Environment minister Marina Silva met with John Kerry, the White House envoy for climate change during his visit to Brazil, and announced the resumption of a US-Brazil environment group created in 2015 to debate energy transition, low carbon economy, climate change mitigation, indigenous peoples protection and bioconomy among others between the two countries. Nevertheless, no contribution to the Amazon Fund was announced by Kerry during the visit.

In September 2023, Lula and Biden met on the sidelines of the 78th United National General Assembly (UNGA), in New York, to launch an initiative to promote worker's rights.

In June 2024, it was reported that Brazil and the US were preparing to launch a joint green transition partnership involving lithium, niobium and other strategic minerals to expand and develop both countries' supply chains.

====== Under Trump ======
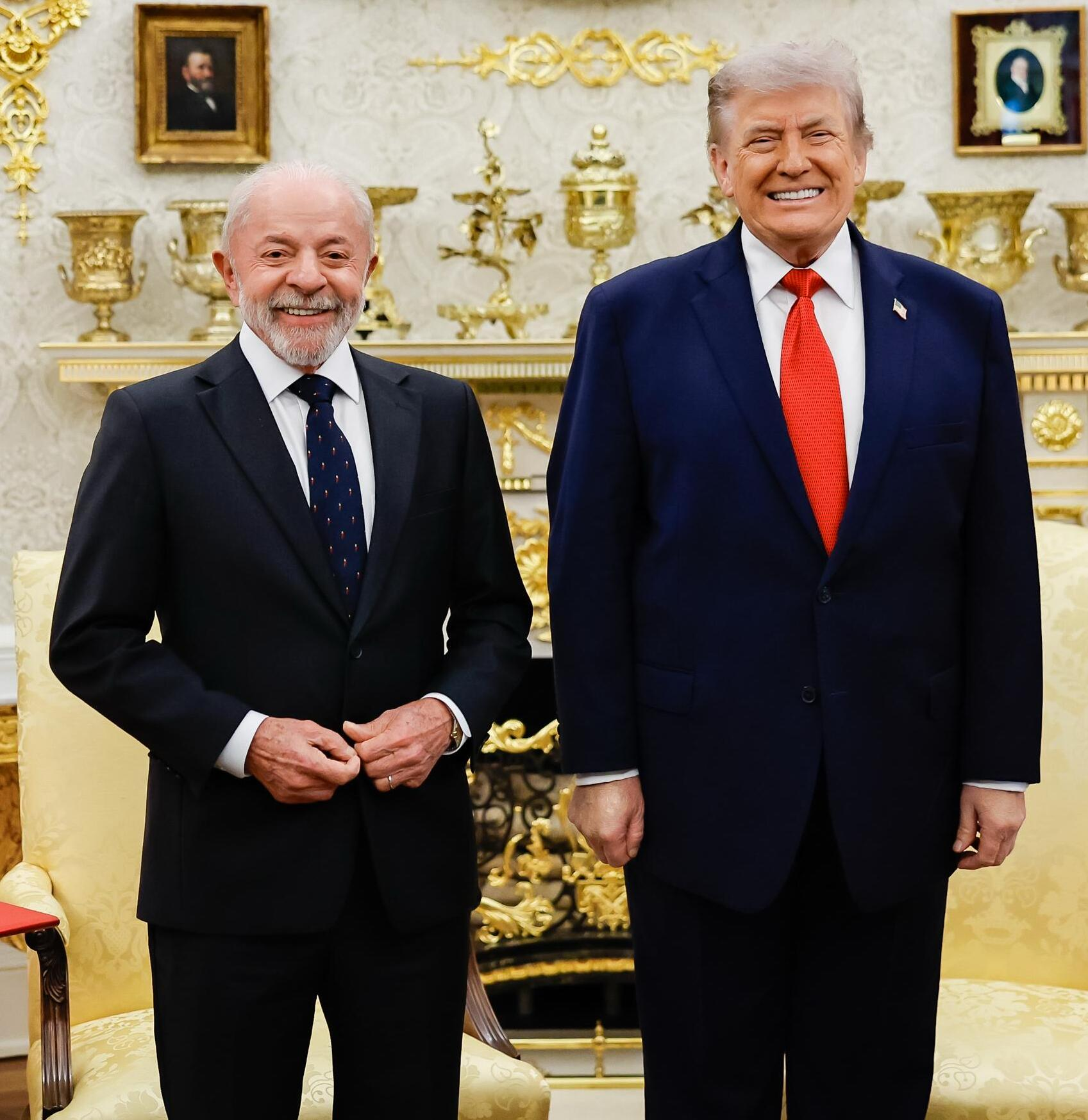
President Lula and US President Donald Trump at the White House on 7 May 2026

Following the re-election of Donald Trump in November 2024, Lula congratuled Trump on X (formerly Twitter) and again, after his inauguration, in January 2025, when Lula also highlighted Brazil-United States historical friendship.

After Trump first threatened to impose tariffs on steel and aluminium in February 2025, and fulfilled that in March, Lula warned the United States economy could self-inflict damage, and promised to open a complaint against the 25% tariffs imposed on Brazilian steel and aluminum exports bound to US at the World Trade Organization. He also said he would not hesitate to call Trump to disscuss such tariffs, and hoped he answered his call.

=== Europe ===
==== European Union ====
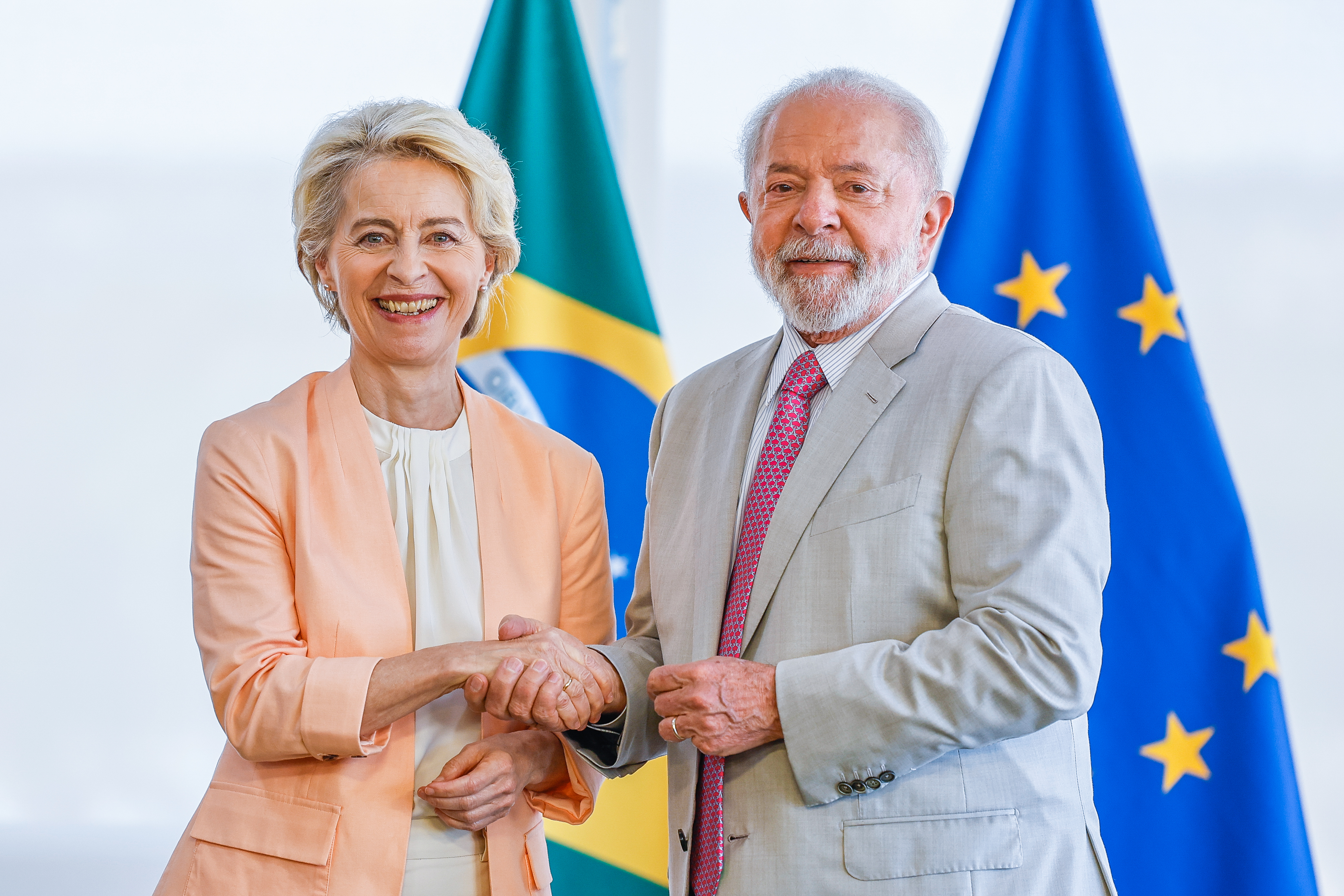
Lula and European Commission president Ursula von der Leyen during a meeting in Brasília, in June 2023

In January 2023, Vice President Geraldo Alckmin met with Vice President Frans Timmermans of the EU Commission in Brasília. During his visit to Brazil, Timmermans said that President Lula's efforts to end destruction in the Amazon deserves support and cooperation from the European Union, adding that the EU could donate up to €750,000 to help the Yanomami people facing a humanitarian crisis.

In March 2023, the EU's commissioner for competition Margrethe Vestager met with Vice President Alckmin and other Brazilian officials during a meeting in Brasília to unveil the EU-Brazil bilateral Investment Map.

In June 2023, Lula met with EU president Ursula von der Leyen to discuss areas such as environment, science and technology and trade, namely the EU-Mercosur trade deal. Lula expressed concerns over a European Union's side letter proposal of sanctioning Mercosur goods in case they fail to meet environmental goals saying that "between partners there should be mutual confidence not mistrust and sanctions" and that the sanctions could hurt genuine Brazilian green efforts. During the meeting the European Union pledged to donate 20 million euros to the Amazon Fund.

In July 2023, numerous Latin American, Caribbean and European leaders, including Lula, attended the III EU-CELAC summit in Brussels to discuss topics such as global hunger, inequalities, poverty and climate change. On the sidelines of the summit, Lula made the case for the EU-Mercosur trade deal and expressed concern for protectionist policies in the agreement. He also met with King Philippe of Belgium and Belgian prime minister Alexander de Croo as well as with former Swedish prime minister Stefan Löfven, Danish prime minister Mette Frederiksen and other leaders.

In September 2023, Finance Minister Fernando Haddad said Lula was pushing for the EU-Mercosur trade deal to be concluded in 2023. In November 2023, Lula told EU's Commission chief Ursula Von der Leyen that he wished to finish the deal by the end of 2023 when Brazil still presided Mercorsur's rotating presidency.

==== France ====
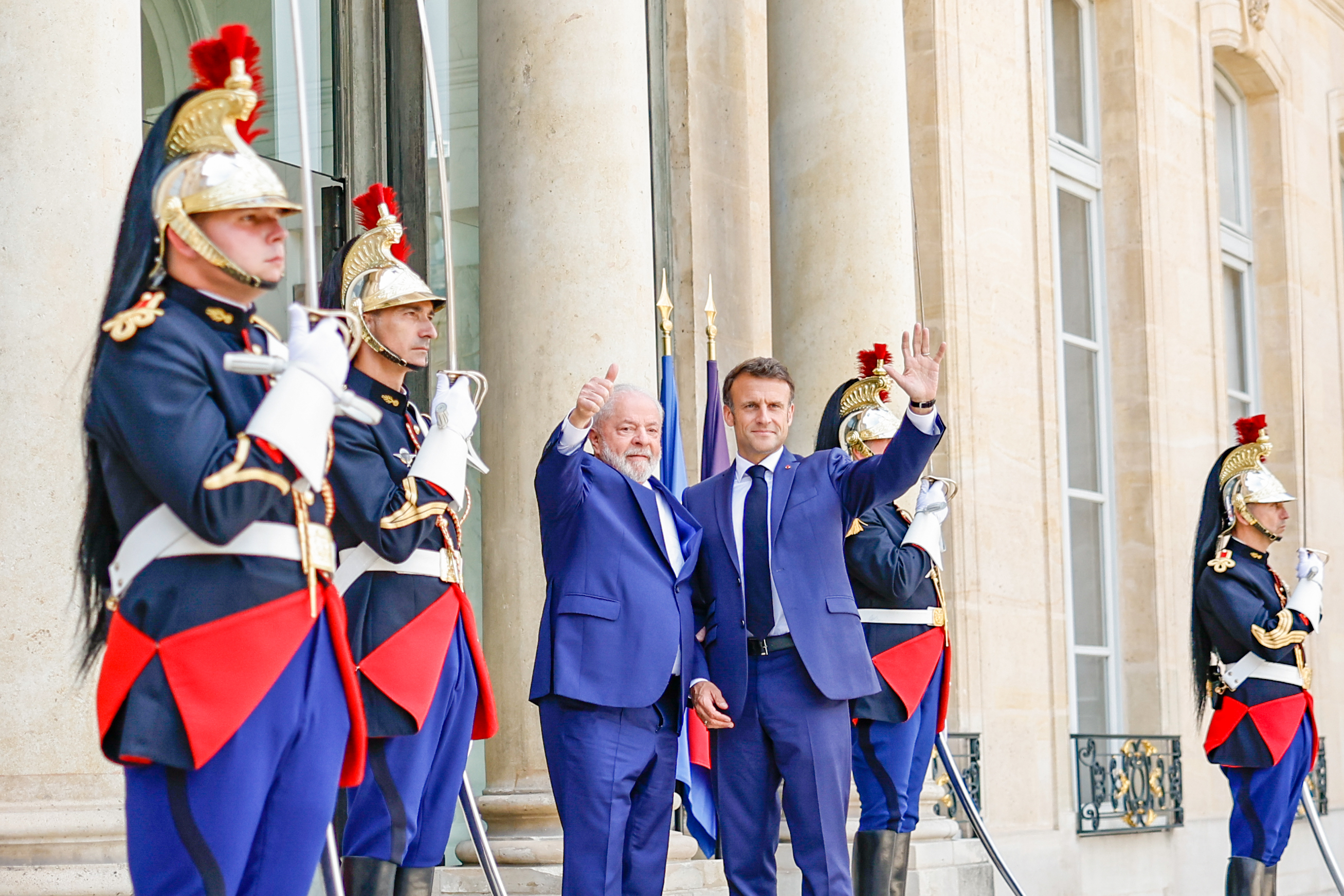
Lula and French president Emmanuel Macron wave at the press at the Élysée Palace in June 2023

In February 2023, French Foreign Minister Catherine Colonna met with President Lula and stated that "Brazil is one of the main actors on the global stage and its comeback is highly expected", highlighting that France and Brazil share a strong, centuries-old relationship. She also said that France supports a Brazilian OECD membership and that both France and the European Union are considering monetary contributions to the Amazon Fund. On 11 February, French president Emmanuel Macron expressed his approval for a peace plan on the Russia-Ukraine war proposed by Lula, which consists of creating a group of countries not involved in the conflict (either directly or indirectly, i.e. by sending weapons to one of the sides) to mediate a peace process.

On 3 June 2023, Macron's office said Lula confirmed he would visit Paris in late June as part of the "Summit for a New Global Financial Pact" promoted by France to "tackle the reform of multilateral development banks (MDB), the debt crisis, financing for green technologies, the creation of new international taxes and financing instruments", among other things. On 22 June, president Lula delivered a speech during the Power Our Planet festival in Paris in which he said "actually, those who have polluted the planet over the last two centuries are the same ones who made the Industrial Revolution, and that's why they must pay their debt to the planet Earth" while calling for climate justice to Latin-American, African and Asian peoples and inviting the world to attend the COP30 climate conference in the Brazilian city of Belém. On 23 June, Lula separately met with French president Emmanuel Macron and Paris mayor Anne Hidalgo.

In October 2023, Brazil said Macron accepted an invitation by Lula to visit the country in the first half of 2024, which was subsequently confirmed by Macron himself during a bilateral meeting with Lula during the COP28 on 2 December 2023. In March 2024, Macron was welcomed by Lula for a three days-long state visit in the northern Brazilian city of Belém, where they met indigenous leader Raoni Metuktire who was awarded the Legion of Honour). Both leaders also announced France and Brazil were launching a four years-long investment plan worth of €1.1 billion to develop the Amazon region including French Guiana. Macron and Lula also visited Itaguaí to launch a third out of four conventional submarines being developed through the French-Brazilian Submarine Development Programme (PROSUB), before visiting Brasília to sign twenty bilateral agreements on 28 March 2024. Macron announced France will help Brazil build its nuclear-powered submarine under PROSUB. During the visit, Lula stated that "Among traditional powers, none is closer to Brazil than France".

==== Germany ====
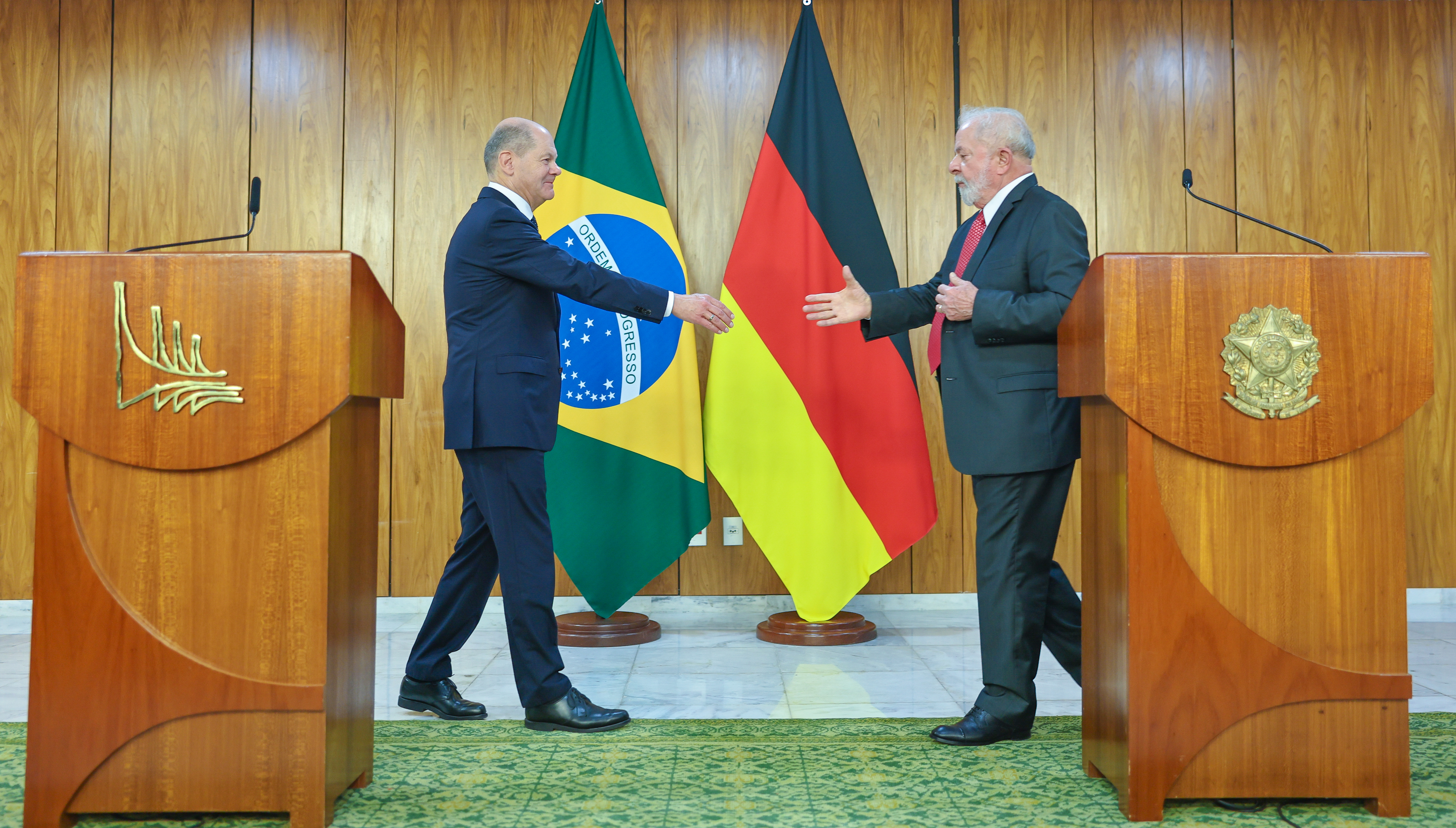
Joint press conference of Lula and German Chancellor Olaf Scholz following their meeting on 30 January 2023

In January 2023, Germany ambassador to Brazil Heiko Thoms confirmed Chancellor Olaf Scholz would visit Brazil on 30 January. According to a statement, the main subjects to be addressed would be environment (including the re-establishment of the Amazon Fund) and trade between Germany and Brazil. On 30 January, Germany development minister Svenja Schulze announced the country will donate €204 million (US$222 million) to Brazil aiming to help restore farming degraded areas through low-interest rate loans, as well as it will make fresh monetary contributions to the Amazon Fund and provide local aid to Brazilian states in the Amazon region; new sustainable agriculture and green hydrogen projects in Brazil are also being looked upon by the German government, according to Schulze. During the meeting with Scholz, Lula proposed creating a group of countries, including India, Indonesia and China, that would "mediate a peace process" in the Russo-Ukrainian War.

In March 2023, Germany's Vice Chancellor Robert Habeck and Agriculture Minister Cem Özdemir, as well as several German business people, attended the German-Brazilian Economic Meeting in Belo Horizonte where they met with vice-president Geraldo Alckmin.

==== Italy ====
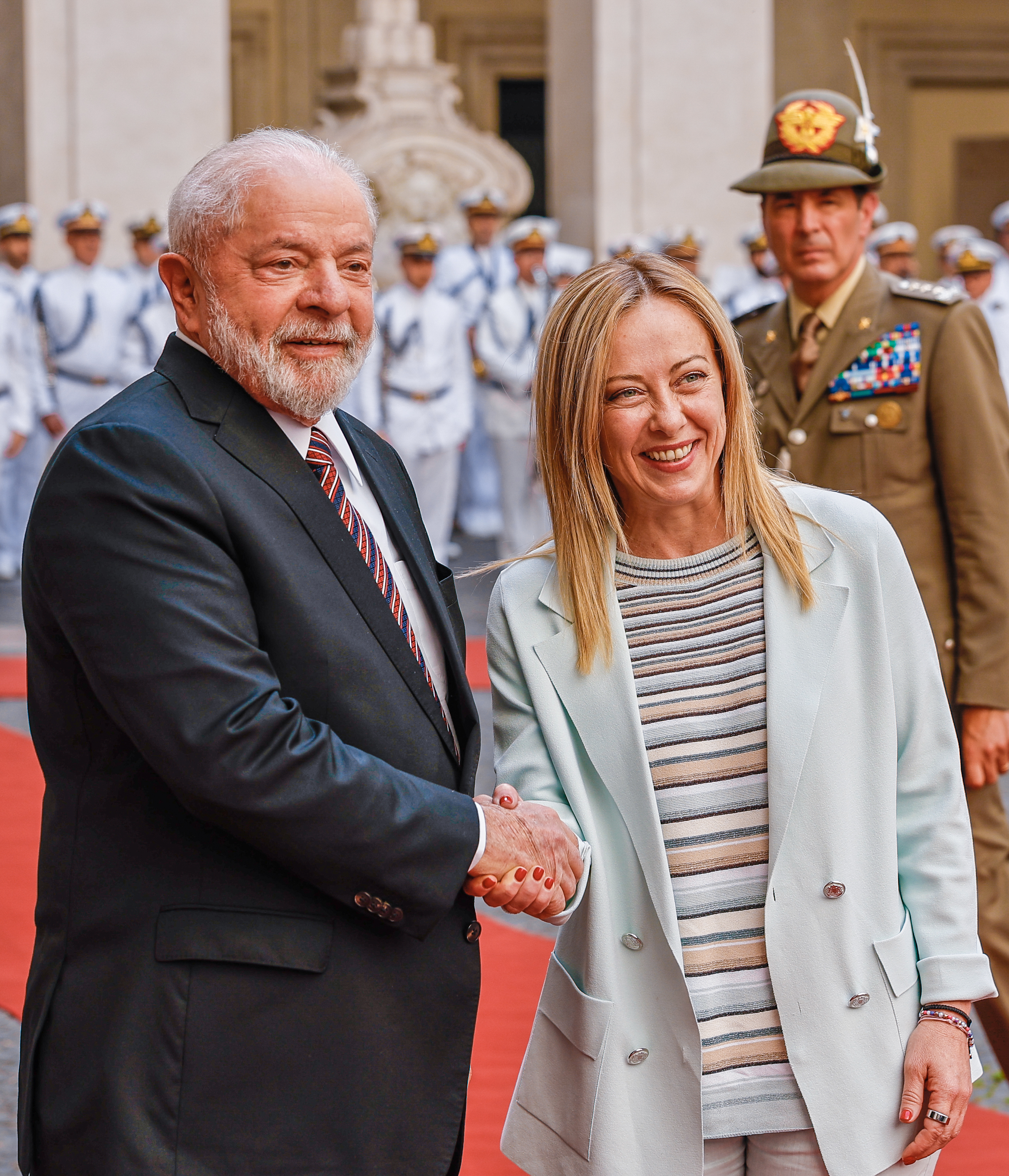
Lula with Italian prime minister Giorgia Meloni after their meeting at the Chigi Palace in Rome on 12 June 2023

In an interview to Italian newspaper Corriere della Sera on 20 June, Lula asserted that Italy is a priority for Brazil, especially because Brazil has "30 million Brazilians of Italian descent and great relations with Italian trade unions, intellectuals and companies".

On 20 June, Lula met with left-wing sociologist and professor emeritus at the Sapienza University of Rome Domenico De Masi during his visit to Rome. On 21 June, Lula met with General Secretary of the Democratic Party (PD), Elly Schlein, and former Prime Minister Massimo D'Alema, with whom he reportedly had talks about "democracy, world peace, climate change, inequality and challenges common to several countries". Brazilian government officials also said that Lula and Schlein had a talk about "gender violence and sexism in politics". Lula also met and dined with Italian president Sergio Mattarella at the Quirinal Palace to reportedly discuss about the relations between Brazil and Italy, as well as the Mercosur-European Union deal.

Upon returning from his visit to the Vatican, he also had a meeting with Italian Prime Minister Giorgia Meloni at the Chigi Palace. During an interview to the press after the meeting, he praised Meloni, saying that "ideological differences wouldn't end diplomacy" between the two countries. Lula also had a meeting and private dinner with Rome mayor Roberto Gualtieri.

==== Vatican ====
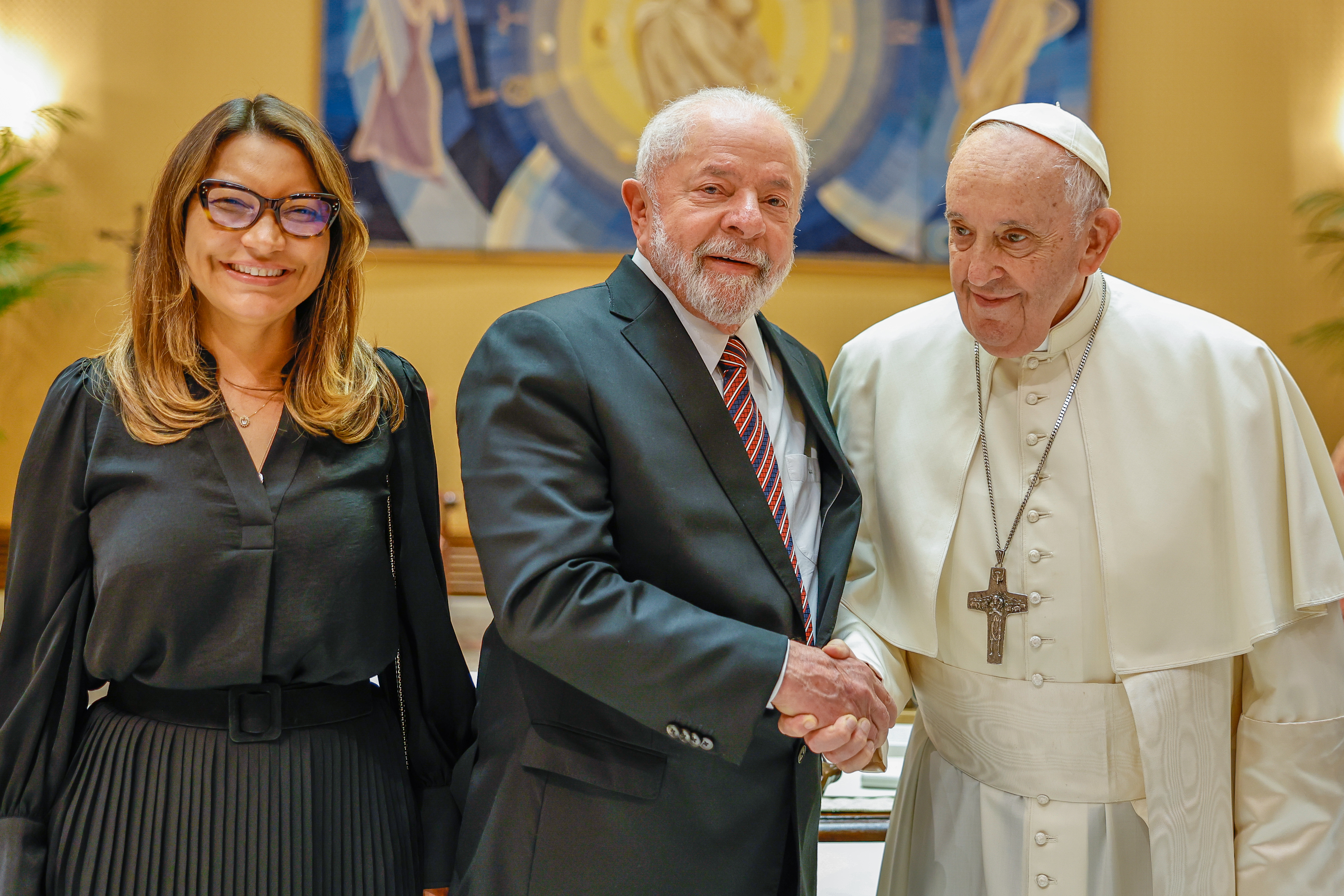
Lula and Rosângela with Pope Francis after their meeting in Brasília, June 2023

Lula met with Pope Francis on the Vatican City on 12 June after his diner with Italian President Sergio Mattarella, during the meeting at Paul VI's room, they reportedly discussed "peace and reconciliation, environmental preservation, respect for indigenous populations and the fight against hunger, inequality and poverty in the world", according to Brazilian and Holy See officials, although there was no explicit mention to the current Russo-Ukrainian war, Lula reportedly wanted to talk about a possible peaceful solution of the conflict with the Pope, but neither side mentioned any talks about that particular subject.

Lula gave the Pope an engraving of the Holy Family made by Pernambuco artist J. F. Borges, while Rosângela brought the Pontiff an image of Our Lady of Nazaré, patroness of the Amazon, while the Pope gave Lula and Janja a bronze art with the phrase "Peace is a fragile flower", he also presented the couple with a copy of his Message of Peace for 2023, the document on Human Fraternity and the book with the prayer he did in a deserted St. Peter's Square, on 27 March 2020, praying for the end of the COVID-19 pandemic, Lula and Janja also invited the priest to travel to Pará to participate in the "Círio" in October of that year, but acceptance must depend on the state of health of the Pontiff, who was discharged from his most recent hospitalization, the second in two months, on Friday, after the meeting with the Pope, Lula had met with Dom Edgar Peña Parra, responsible for General Affairs at the Vatican Secretariat of State. In both meetings, according to him, "the good relations between Brazil and the Holy See and the harmonious collaboration between Church and State in favour of the promotion of moral values and the common good" were highlighted.

==== Portugal ====
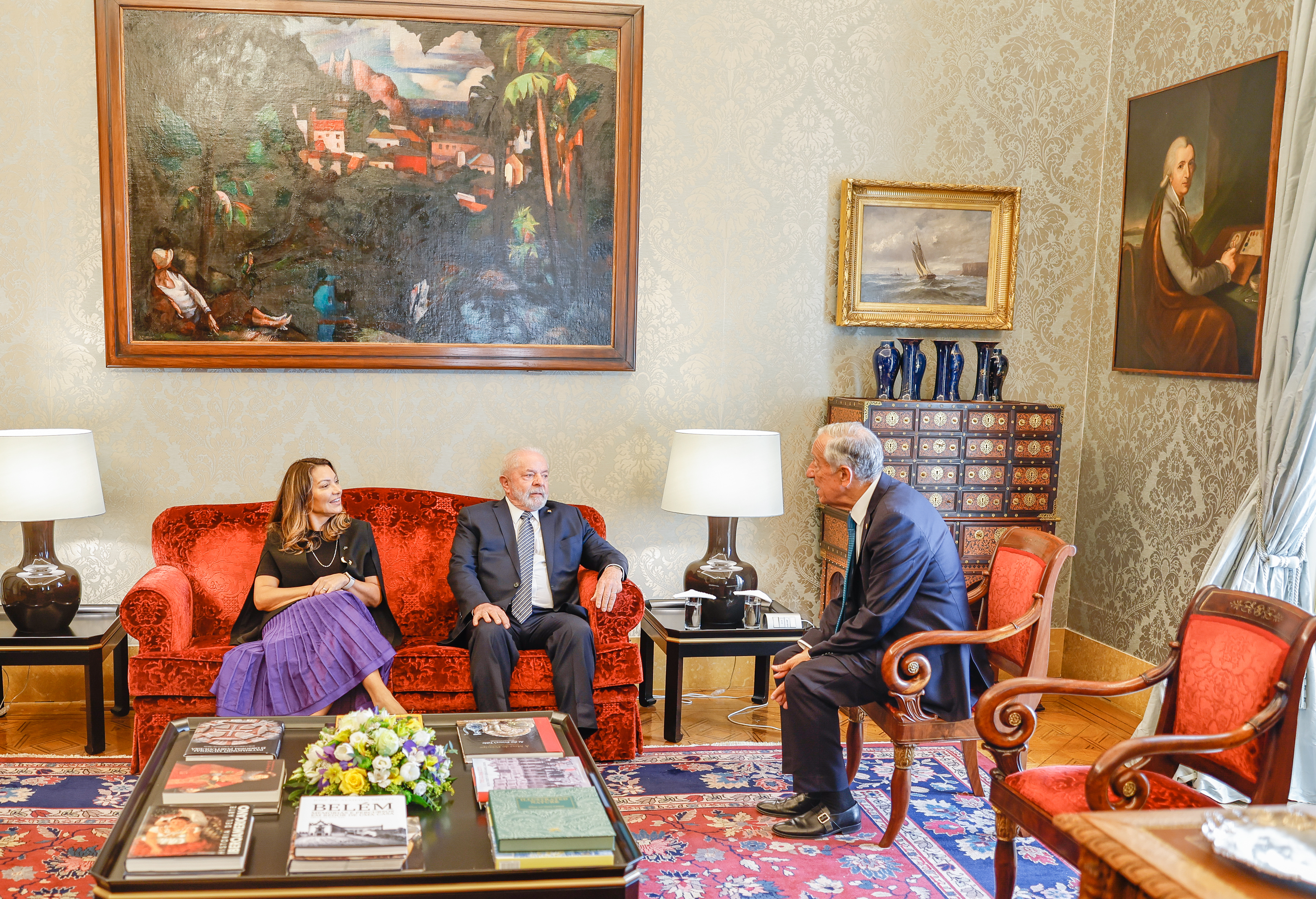
Lula, Rosângela and Portuguese president Marcelo Rebelo de Sousa in a meeting in the Belém Palace on 22 April 2023

In November 2022, then president-elect Lula visited Portugal after attending the COP27 in Egypt, making it his first bilateral trip after being elected. He met with Portuguese president Marcelo Rebelo de Sousa and prime minister António Costa.

In March 2023, Brazilian minister Alexandre Padilha confirmed Lula's first visit to Portugal as president.

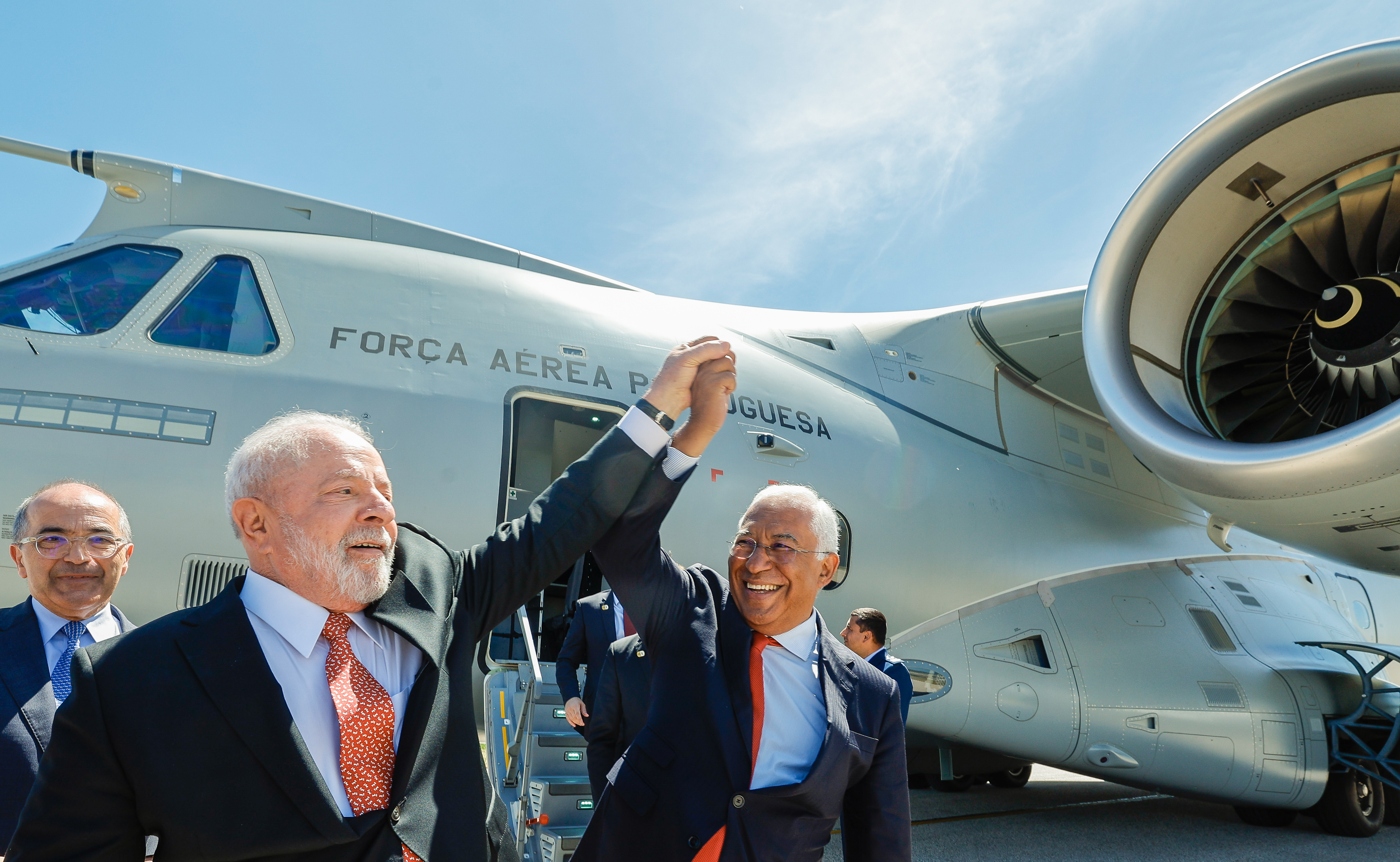
Lula and Portuguese Prime Minister António Costa visit an OGMA facility in Alverca on 24 April 2023

In April 2023, President Lula began his four-day trip during which he called Portugal relations with Brazil "extraordinary" and stated that "Portugal is not simply a foreign country but our home extension". In the 13th Brazil-Portugal Summit the countries signed several agreements such as a mutual recognition of professional degrees, driver's licenses, rights of persons with disabilities and a witness protection programme in both countries. Other agreements signed during the visit include education, science, tourism, energy and audiovisual areas. Lula also attended a high-level Brazilian-Portuguese business meeting in Matosinhos in which Brazilian aerospace giant Embraer and four Portuguese companies (OGMA, EMPORDEF, GMVIS Skysof and CEiiA) announced a deal to build a Brazilian-designed aircraft. Also in the meeting, Prime Minister António Costa announced Portugal companies EDP and Galp will be investing a total of €5.7 billion in projects in Brazil over the next years. On 24 April, Lula took part in a ceremony at the Queluz Palace to award Brazilian singer and songwriter Chico Buarque the Camões Prize.

==== Spain ====
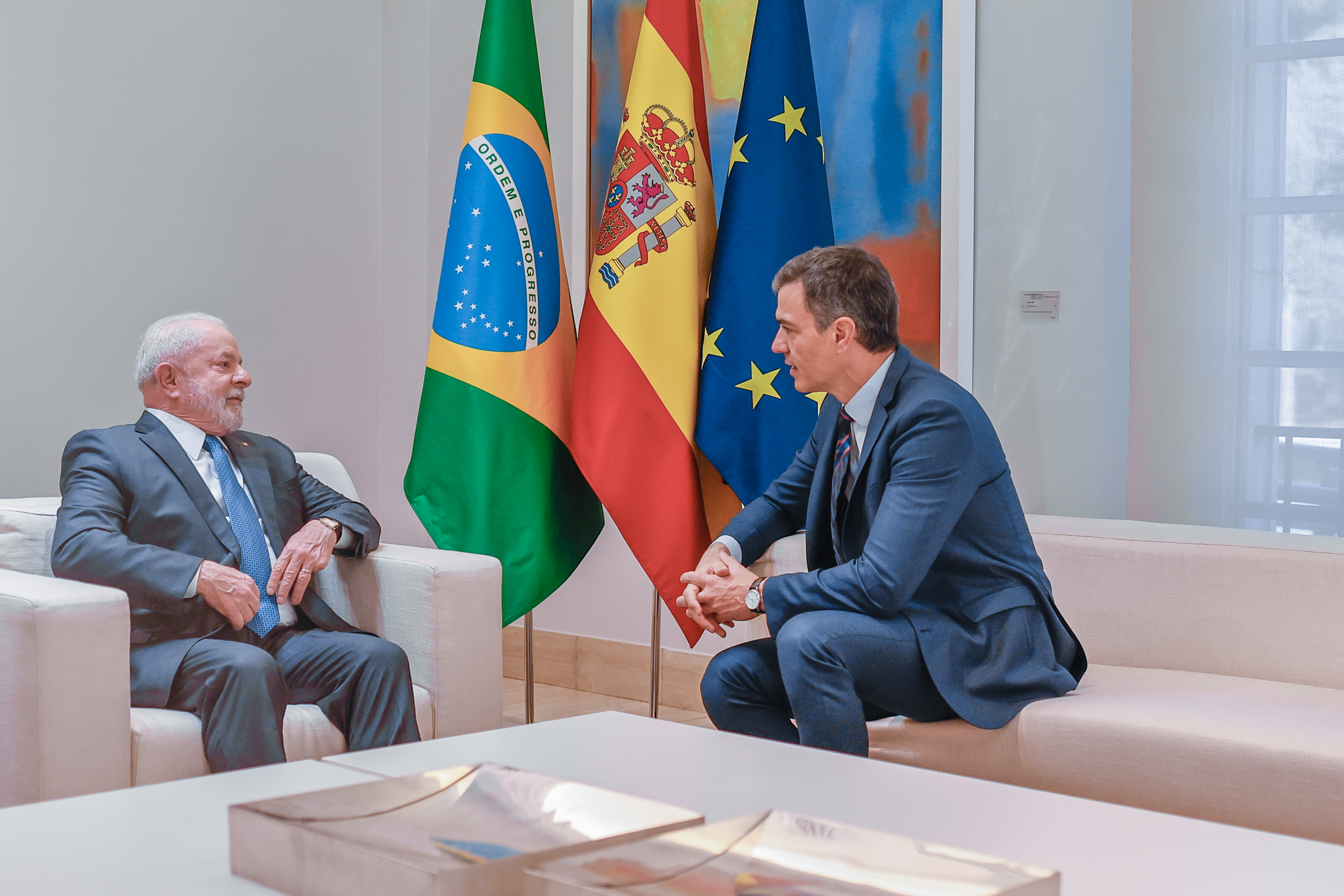
Lula with Spanish PM Pedro Sánchez at the Moncloa Palace on 26 April 2023

In April 2023, Lula met with union leaders and took part in the Brazil-Spain Business Forum in Madrid. On 26 April, Lula, alongside several of his cabinet ministers, met with Spanish prime minister Pedro Sánchez at the Moncloa Palace, where he signed two different deals regarding education and work areas, which includes facilitating student exchange programmes between universities in both countries, expanding cooperation between in higher education and adopting regulations for IT companies Later on that day, Lula, Rosângela and FM Mauro Vieira met with King Felipe VI at the Royal Palace of Madrid.

In March 2023, Lula received Sánchez in Brasília ahead of the 2024 G20 Rio de Janeiro summit to discuss trade relations between Brazil and Spain including the EU-Mercosur Association Agreement as well the reform of world institutions such as the United Nations and the World Bank.

==== United Kingdom ====
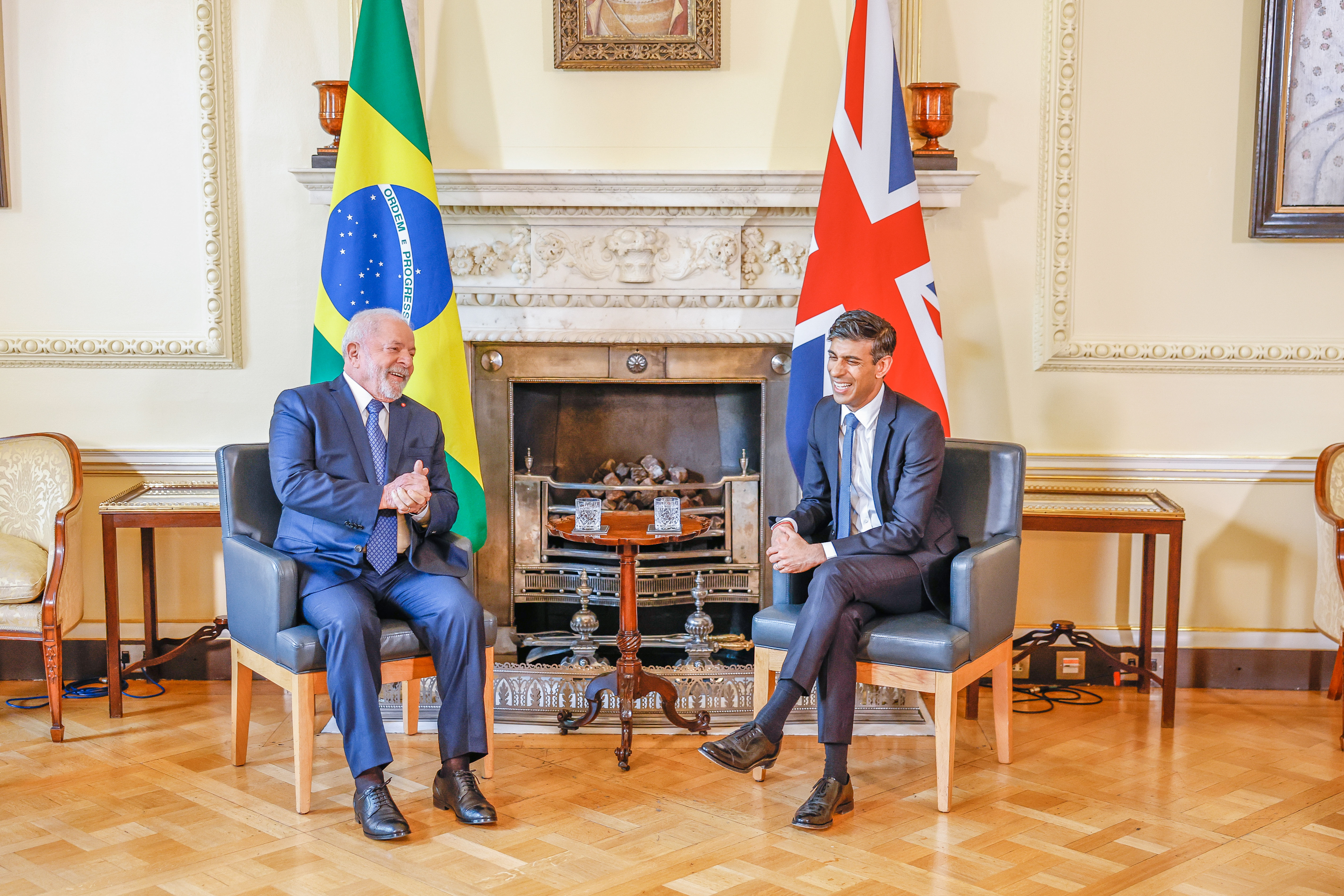
Lula and PM Rishi Sunak on 5 May 2023

In May 2023, Lula and Rosângela travelled to the United Kingdom to attend the coronation of Charles III and Camilla and had a separate meeting with the King. Lula also met with the UK's Prime Minister Rishi Sunak, who announced his country was donating £80 million (BRL 500 million) to the Amazon Fund initiative, run by Brazil. During his trip, Lula called for the release of WikiLeaks founder Julian Assange, adding that "we talk about freedom of speech [but] the guy is in prison because he denounced wrongdoing" and "it is an embarrassment that a journalist who denounced trickery by one state against another is arrested, condemned to die in jail and we do nothing to free him. It's a crazy thing". Lula urged to create an international media movement to lobby for Assange's release.

==== Russia ====
===== Russo-Ukrainian war =====
President Lula has taken a neutral instance on the war in Ukraine while highlighting the human cost of the war, as well as its impact on food security, cost of living and global supply chains, among others, as he has stated the importance of a peace process led by non-directly or indirectly involved nations such as India, Indonesia and China.

In January 2023, Lula stated that he was "against the occupation Russia has done in Ukraine" for which he was praised by the Ukrainian World Congress

During his trip to the US in February 2023, Lula and US president Joe Biden jointly criticized Russia for its invasion of Ukraine. On 24 February 2023, Brazil voted to condemn Russia over its invasion of Ukraine at the UNGA.

In April 2023, Lula commenting on peace negotiations said "Putin must not take the Ukrainian territory. Crimea might not be on the table, but when it comes to what he [Putin] invaded again, he must reconsider it", with some media outlets mistranslating his statements as urging Ukraine to give up Crimea to Russia.

Lula has also insisted in seeking peace, which is a binding foreign policy principle under the current pacifist Constitution , (Note: See Article 4, VI, VII) as he turned down Brazilian military weaponry sales proposed by Germany and France to be sent to Ukraine.

In April 2023, Lula stated after a state visit to China that "the United States needs to stop encouraging war and start talking about peace". U.S. National Security Council spokesman John Kirby responded by accusing Lula of "parroting Russian and Chinese propaganda", describing his comments as "simply misguided" and "suggesting the United States and Europe are somehow not interested in peace, or that we share responsibility for the war."

On 19 May 2023, Lula said he was "upset" after Ukrainian president Volodymyr Zelesnkyy did not attend a meeting between both on the sidelines of the G7 Summit in Hiroshima. On 22 May, Danish foreign minister Lars Løkke Rasmussen said that Denmark was interested in hosting a summit aimed at "finding peace between Ukraine and Russia". but "it is necessary to build interest and involvement from countries like India, Brazil and China."

In September 2023, Lula and Ukrainian president Volodymyr Zelenskyy met on the sidelines of the 78th United National General Assembly (UNGA), in New York; Lula pledged to maintain an open dialogue between their countries to end the war.

=== Asia ===
==== China ====
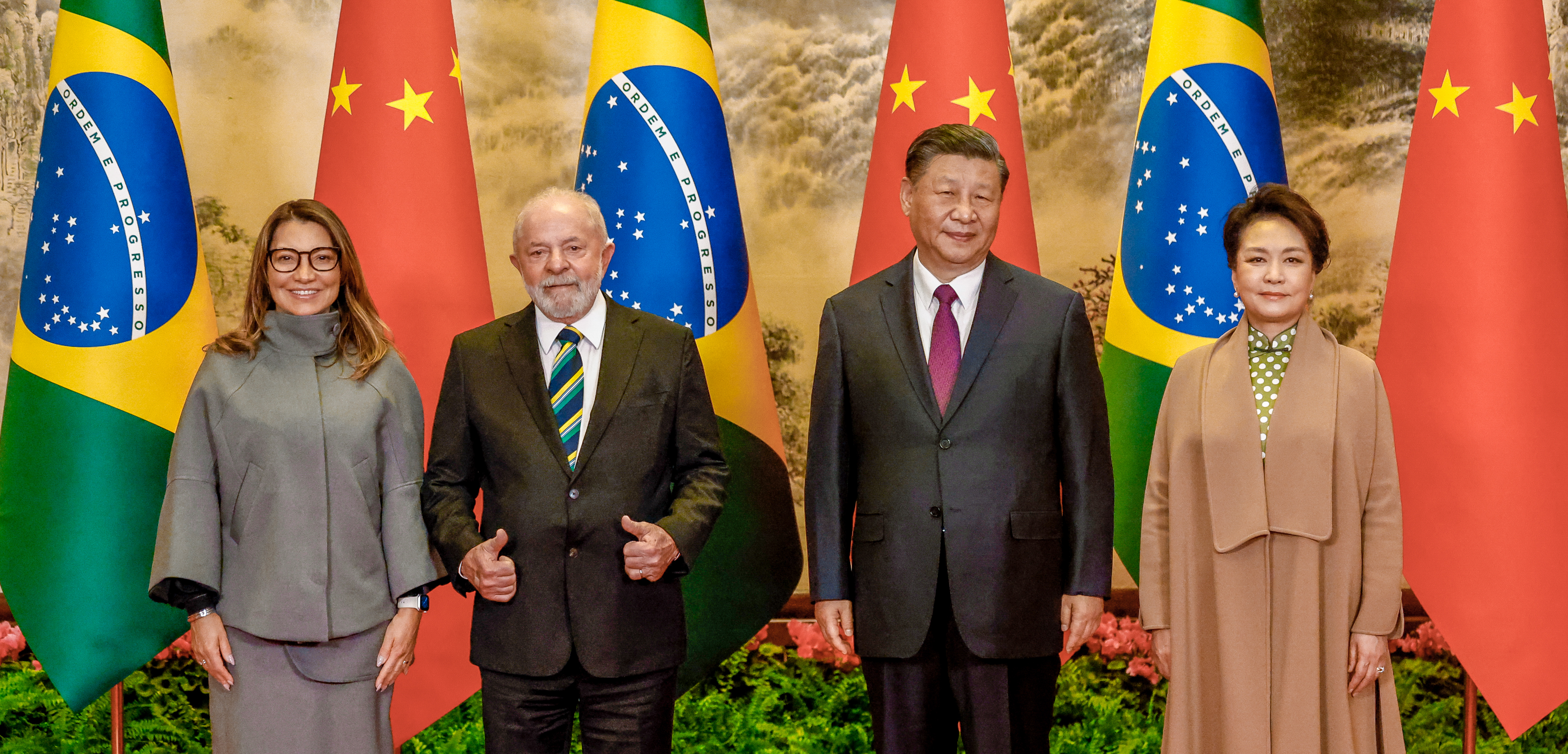
Lula, Rosângela with Chinese leader Xi Jinping and his first-lady Peng Liyuan in Beijing, 14 April 2023

In February 2023, Reuters reported that President Lula would meet with General Secretary of the Chinese Communist Party Xi Jinping during a four-day trip to China on 28 March to hold talks about trade, including green economy, digital inclusion, reindustrialization and the Russia-Ukraine War.

On 17 March 2023, Itamaraty confirmed Lula's trip to China, adding that he would also meet with Chinese premier Li Qiang and National People's Congress chairman Zhao Leji. A week later, New Development Bank (NDB), whose headquarters are in Shanghai, elected Brazilian former president Dilma Rousseff as its new CEO after president Lula made his official appointment. On 24 March, however, due to health issues Lula canceled his trip which was later rescheduled for 11–14 April. As part of a separate high-level business forum between Brazilian and Chinese officials and hundreds of business people in Beijing, both countries announced on 29 March they were starting to trade in their own currencies (the Real and the Renmimbi) instead of in the US dollar.

In April 2023, President Lula, who was accompanied by many of his cabinet ministers, Brazilian state governors and lawmakers, met with Chinese deputy foreign minister Xie Feng upon their arrival in Shanghai, where Lula also attended Brazilian former president Dilma Rousseff inauguration as the new NDB CEO, visited a Huawei center and spoke with several Chinese chairpeople including BYD CEO Wang Chuanfu and China Communications Construction Company (CCCC) CEO Wang Tongzhou. During his stay in Shanghai, Lula criticized US dollar dominance stating "Who was it that decided that the dollar was the currency after the disappearance of the gold standard?" and "why can't we do trade based on our own currencies?". He also urged developing nations to find an alternative currency to the dollar.

On 14 April, Lula separately met with Congress chairman Zhao Leji, Chinese premier Li Qiang and Chinese leader Xi Jinping in Beijing and signed numerous agreements (worth BRL 50 billion – nearly US$10.1 billion) aiming at mutual cooperation such as to further develop the CBERS-4 constellation, to create a pannel to follow the Sustainable Development Goals in both countries and to open a Sino-Brazilian trade fair mainly focused on green, low-carbon economy and digitalization, among other agreements. China and Brazil also urged developed countries to speed up climate change mitigation funds following the rich countries' commitment at the COP 15 to donate US$100 billion a year to do so from 2009 on.

In July 2024, Brazil and China signed an agreement to extend tourist and business visas validity from 5 to 10-years long.

In July 2024, Vice-President Geraldo Alckmin visited China amid the celebrations of bicentenary of the establishment of the Brazilian-Chinese relations, and also reportedly as a preparation for Brazil to join the Chinese Belt and Road Initiative. During the visit Chinese leader Xi Jinping praised Sino-Brazilian relations as a "friendship" that "goes far beyond the bilateral relations". China also announced a loan to help the Brazilian state of Rio Grande do Sul after the April 2024 floods.

==== Japan ====
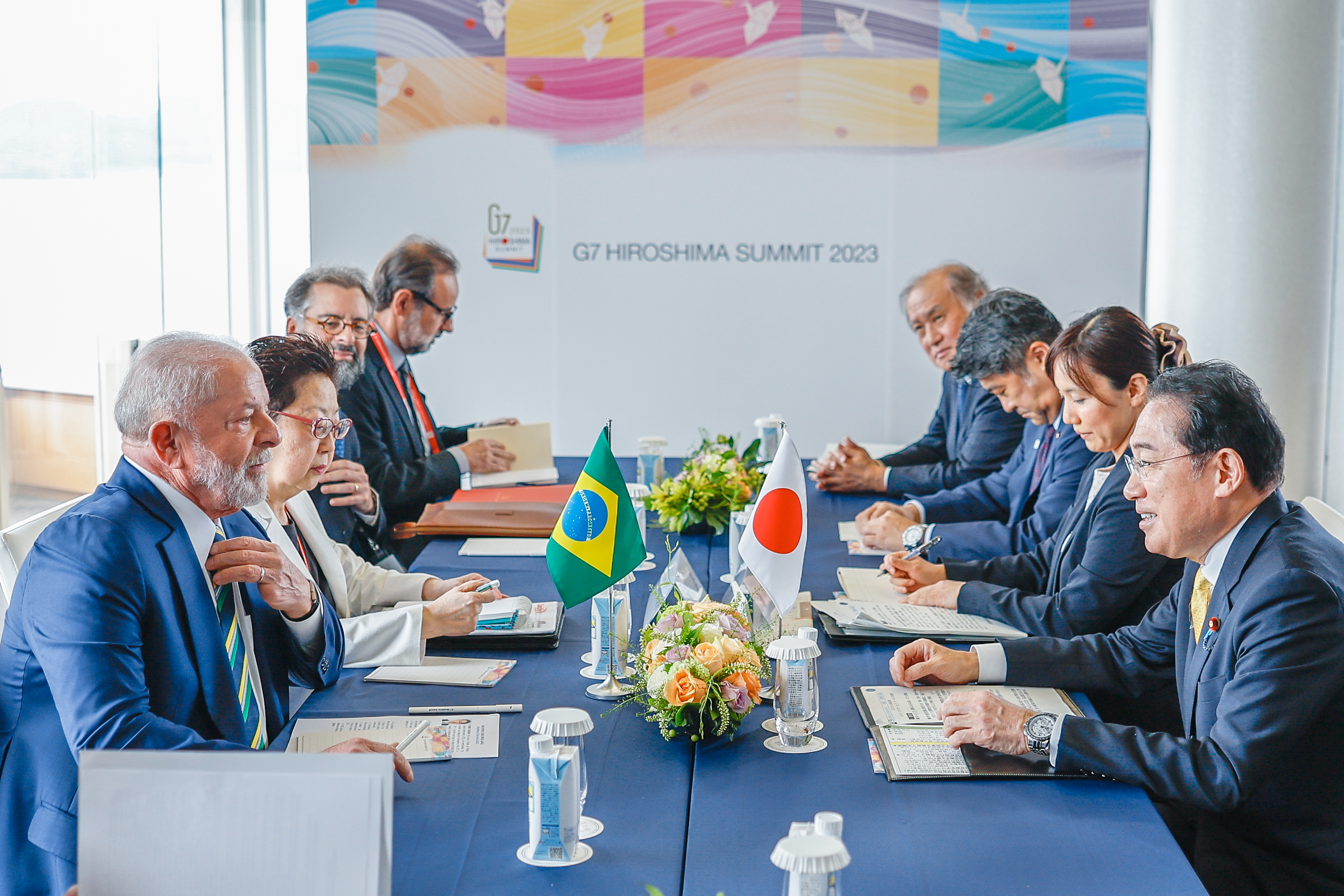
Lula and Japanese FM Fumio Kishida meet on sidelines of the 49th G7 summit in Hiroshima, May 2023

On 21 March, Japanese ambassador to Brazil Teiji Hayashi confirmed that prime minister Fumio Kishida would invite president Lula to the 49th G7 summit to be held from 19 to 21 May 2023 in Hiroshima, which formally took place on 6 April.

In May 2023, Kishida met with Lula and announced that Japan was starting procedures to grant Brazilians travel visa exemptions and was opening a ¥30 billion line of credit to support health companies and other businesses in Brazil through Japan International Cooperation Agency (JICA). Lula said Brazil and Japan need to further develop their commercial, cultural, political and scientific relationship adding that "we have cultural bonds with Japan and a great Japanese-Brazilian community". Both leaders also discussed education, climate change, development and peace.

==== United Arab Emirates ====
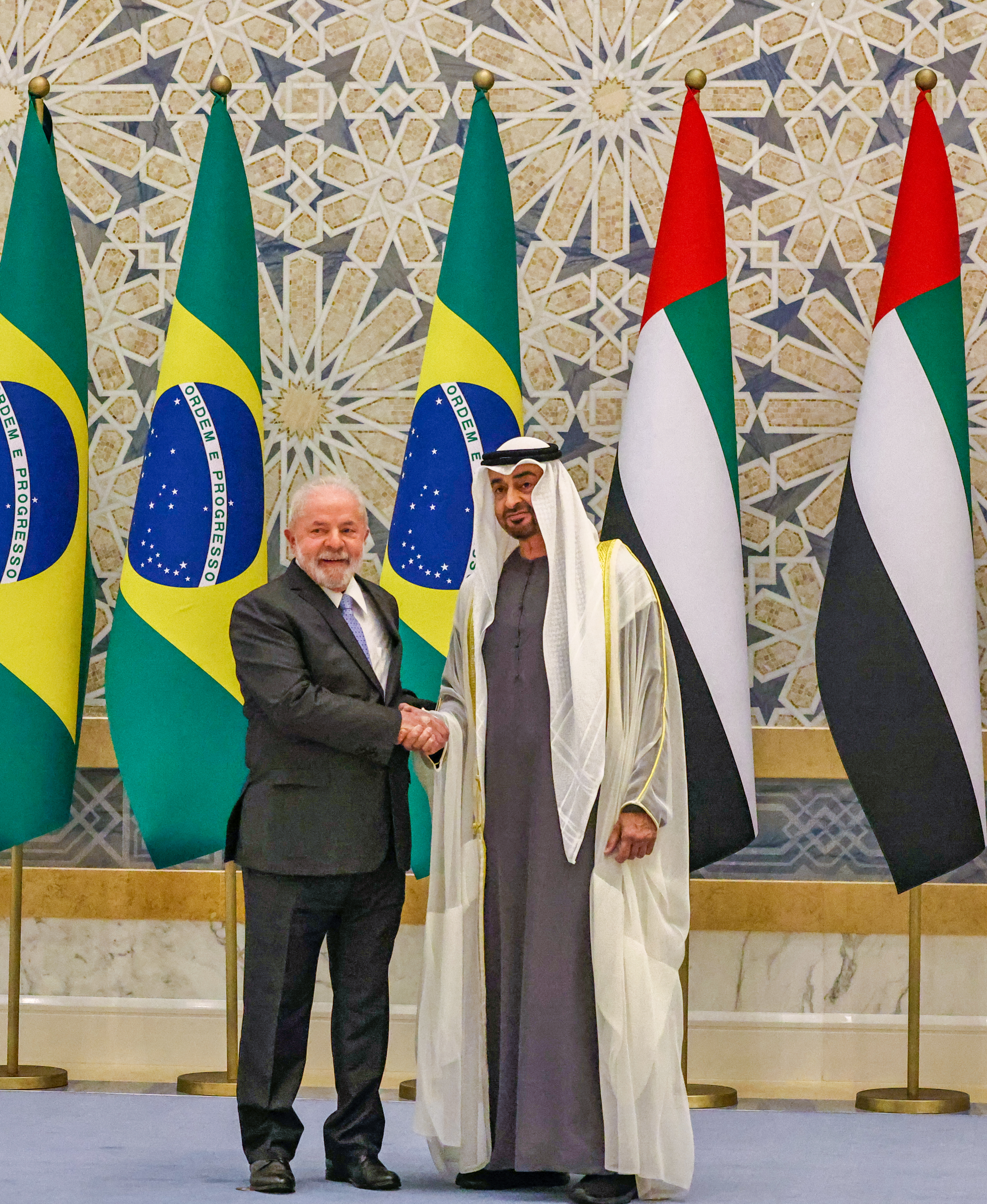
President Lula is welcomed by Emirati president sheikh Mohamed bin Zayed Al Nahyan in the Qasr Al Watan palace on 15 April 2023

In April 2023, President Lula visited the UAE where he met with sheikh and Emirati president Mohammed bin Zayed Al Nahyan. During the visit, Emirati state-owned Mubadala Investment Company announced a deal to invest up to $2.5 billion in biofuels in a refinery in Brazil. The countries signed a series of agreements including one aimed at mutual cooperation against climate change and another on artificial intelligence. Lula also meet with the organizers of the COP28 which will take place in Abu Dhabi in late 2023.

==== Israel–Gaza war ====
On 7 October 2023, a geopolitical conflict began between the State of Israel and Hamas in the Gaza Strip region, which significantly shook the international community. Brazil, at first, did not classify Hamas as a terrorist organization, since the country's policy on this issue directly agrees with the UN classification, which also did not classify it as a terrorist. On the same day, the Ministry of Foreign Affairs and the federal government organized a rescue operation for Brazilians who were in Israel, being the first country to do so. Days later, several planes belonging to the Brazilian Air Force were sent to the region of Israel in order to rescue Brazilians who wanted to go back to Brazil.

On his social networks, President Lula made a post in which he condemned the Hamas attacks and described Brazil as capable of "finding a path to peace". Lula also published that he spoke to Israeli president Isaac Herzog and ratified his repudiation of the events, while also calling for Israel to take all measures to prevent a humanitarian crisis. He also later spoke with the Mahmoud Abbas, president of the Palestinian Authority, and Abdul Fatah Khalil Al-Sisi, president of Egypt. On 20 October, Lula spoke out again on social media, classifying the Hamas attack as an "act of madness" and "terrorism against Israel", and Israel's response as "insane", citing the high mortality rate (especially of children and infants) in Gaza during the bombings and invasion. On 18 October, the Brazilian government took a resolution to the UN Security Council that dealt with the Israel-Hamas conflict. In the proposal, plans to provide basic supplies to civilians in conflict situations, such as water and medicine, as well as calls for the release of Israelis held hostage by Hamas, creation a humanitarian corridor and protection of the physical integrity of civilians were some of the topics discussed; the resolution received 12 votes in favour, but was vetoed due to the opposing vote by the United States.

=== Africa ===
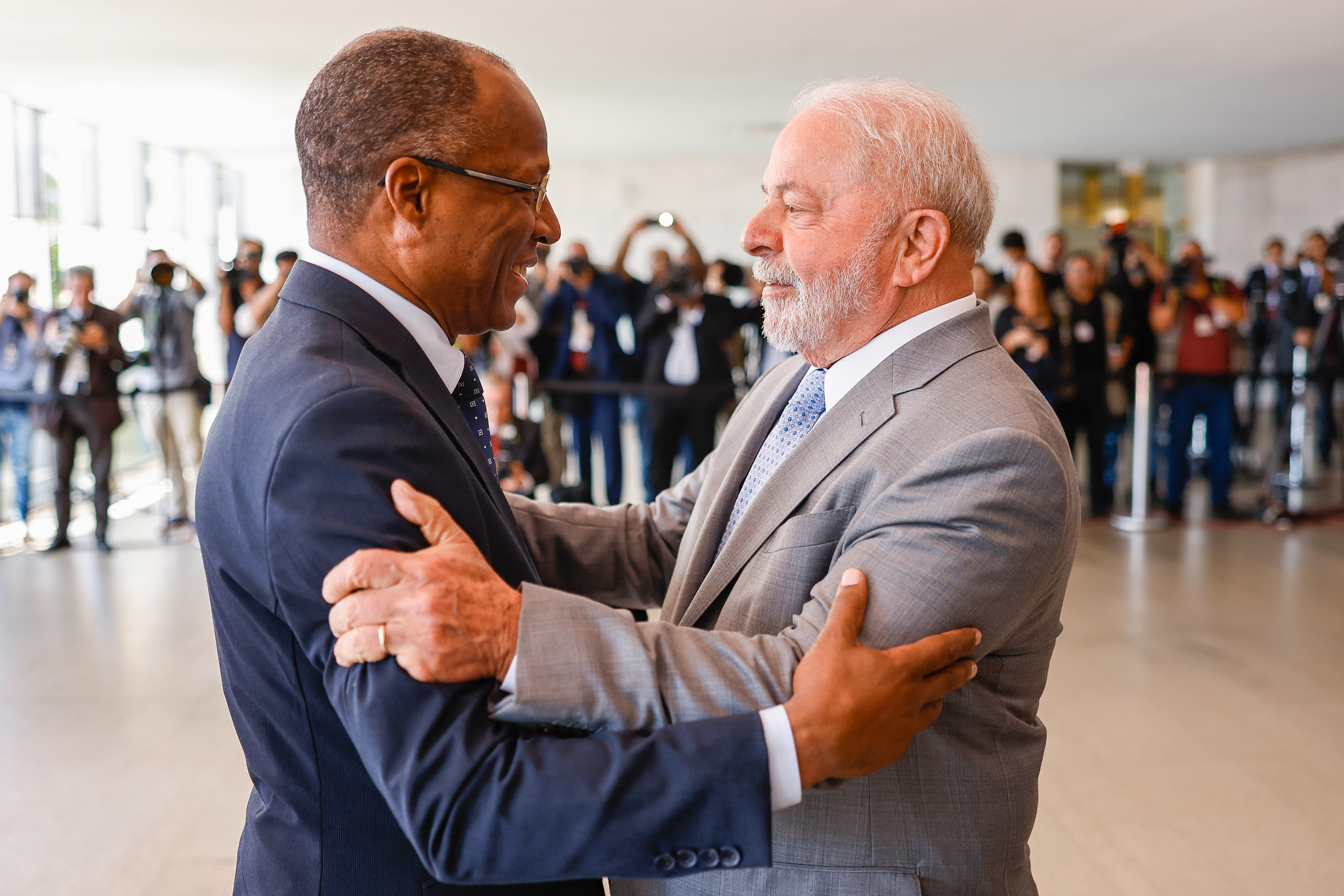
Lula greets Cape Verde prime minister Ulisses Correia e Silva at the Itamaraty Palace in May 2023

In February 2023, President Lula said he was planning to visit Angola, Mozambique and South Africa, and that Brazil should "repay its historical, cultural debt with Africa" through strengthening scientific and technological assistance to African nations.

==== Angola ====
In August 2023, Lula visited Angola, and met with president João Manuel Lourenço, whom he signed seven cooperation agreements in areas such as agriculture, health and education. During his two-day trip Lula was awarded an order of merit, and paid tribute to Angolan independence wartime statesman António Agostinho Neto. He also said Brazil considers opening a general-consulate in Luanda.

==== Cape Verde ====
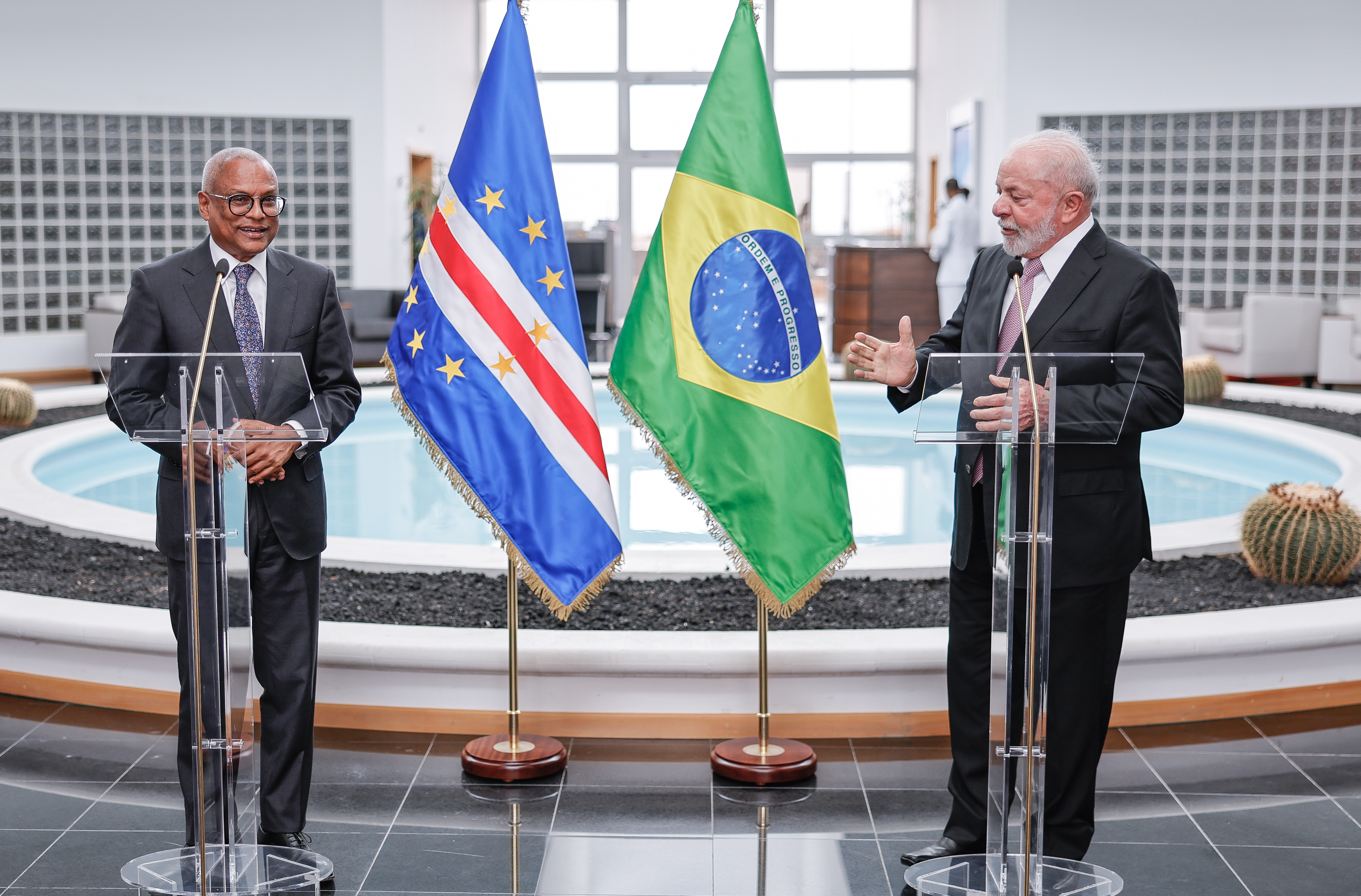
President Lula and Cape Verde president José Maria Neves at the presidential palace in Praia in July 2023

In May 2023, Lula met with Cape Verde prime minister Ulisses Correia e Silva in Brasília. Correia e Silva said his country could play an important role in bringing Brazil closer to ECOWAS countries while Lula stated that "Brazil believes in a solidary, mutually beneficial South-South cooperation based on shared experiences" between countries with Africa being a top priority. Lula said that he intends to step up cooperation programmes with Cape Verde in education and agriculture areas and that he plans to visit at least two African countries in 2023, namely Cape Verde and South Africa, respectively for the 2023 CPLP Summit and the 15th BRICS summit.

In July 2023, Lula visited Cape Verde and met with president José Maria Neves who greeted "Brazil's comeback to international forums". Lula said he wants to "recover the good and productive relations Brazil used to have with Africa", and expressed his desire to open more Brazilian embassies in African countries and to pay another visit to Cape Verde to attend to 2023 CPLP Summit.

==== Egypt ====
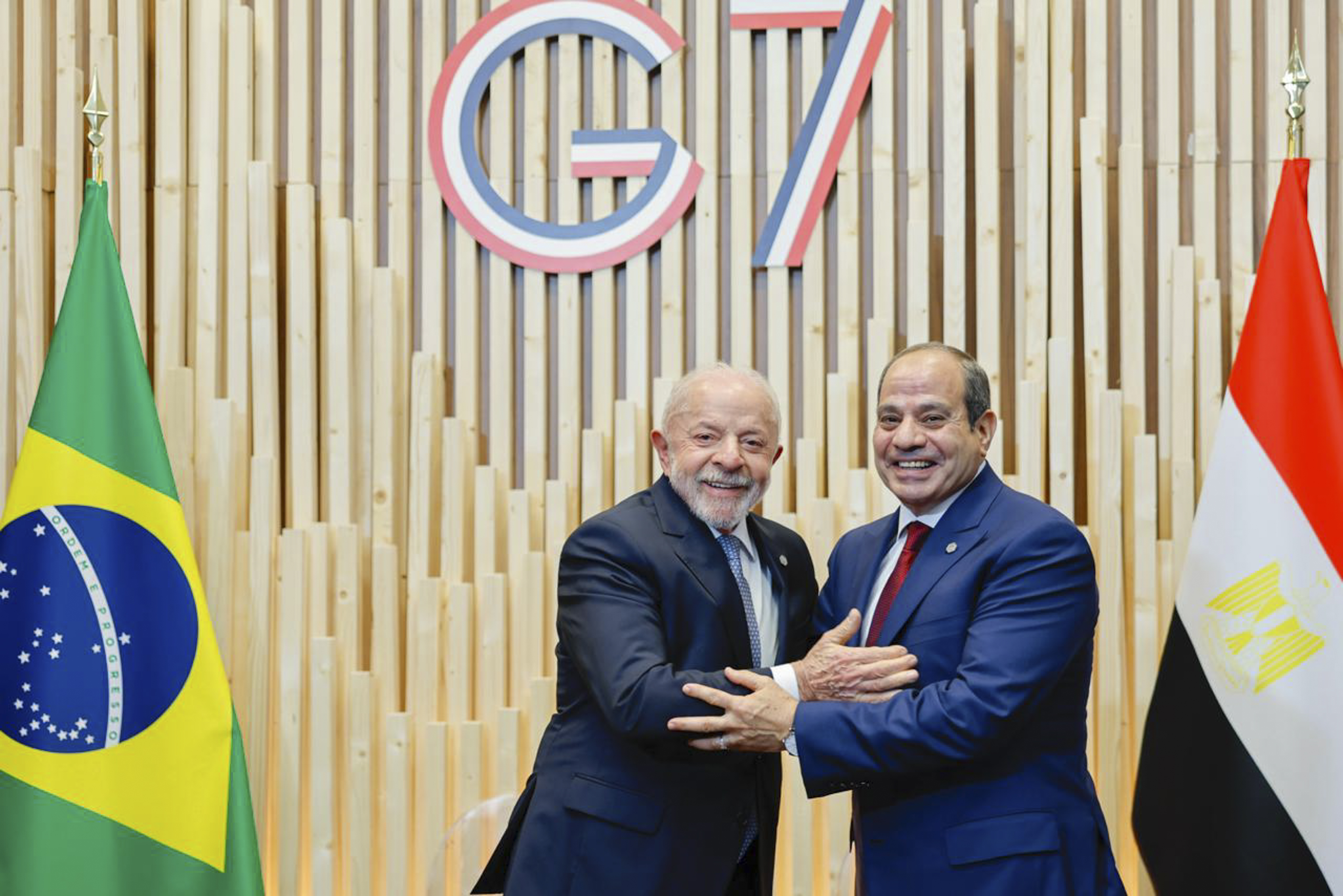
Lula and Egyptian President Abdel Fattah el-Sisi during a meeting in Évian-les-Bains, in June 2026

In January 2024, Lula accepted an invitation by Egypt president Abdel Fattah el-Sisi to visit the country, which took place on 15 February. At the meeting, Brazil and Egypt signed two agreements regarding agriculture and science cooperation.

Lula also met with Arab League's secretary-general Ahmed Aboul Gheit at the League's headquarters, where he called the Israeli campaign in Gaza "inhumanity and cowardice", urging "the collective punishment" of Palestinians by Israel to stop, thus calling for a ceasefire, and all the hostages taken by Hamas to be unconditionally and immediately released. Lula equally defended the international recognition of the Palestinian state, with East Jerusalem as its capital.

==== Ethiopia ====
On 15 February, Lula separately met with Addis Ababa's mayor Adanech Abebe, with whom he attended a ceremony in honour to the fallen of the Battle of Adwa, and Ethiopian prime minister Abiy Ahmed, with whom he called for international climate funding (following rich countries' commitment to yearly donate US$100 billion) in order to secure green energy transition in poor and developing countries.

=== Oceania ===
==== Australia ====
On 10 March 2022, Brazil's Agriculture Ministry announced the country was holding talks with Australia about agricultural trade agreements regarding wheat, barley and pork trade as well as sustainable agriculture including research projects between both countries.

=== International organizations and forums ===
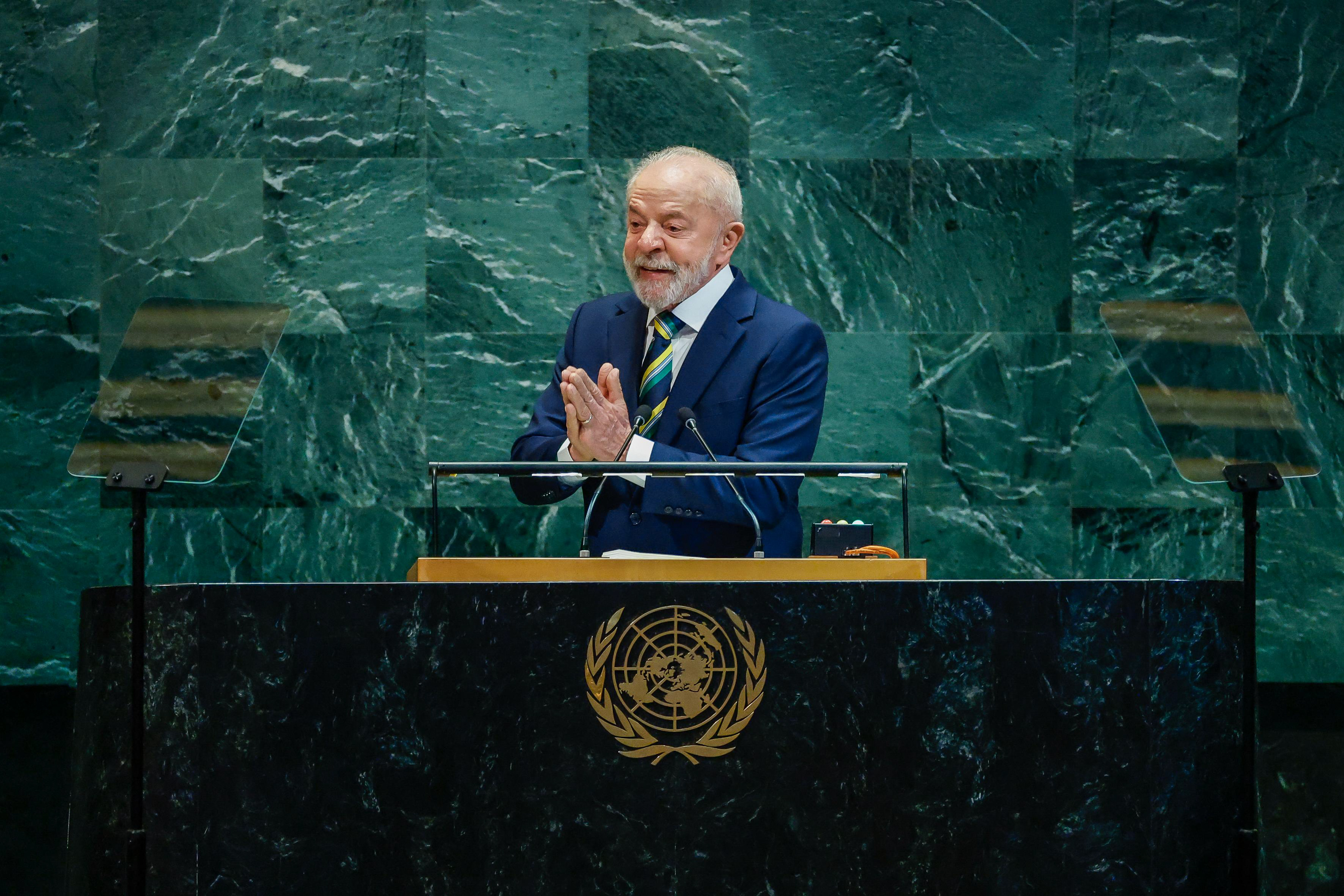
Lula speaking at the 80th session of the United Nations General Assembly

==== Global Compact for Migration ====
On 8 January 2023, Foreign Minister Mauro Vieira announced Brazil rejoined the Global Compact for Migration from which the Bolsonaro government withdrew on 9 January 2019 The UNHCR welcomed the decision stating that ensures "the people's rights and the means so that migrants and refugees can contribute positively to the host countries". According to the Foreign Ministry, the party's mutual benefits of the pact also reflect on the "Brazilian government's commitment to the protection and promotion of the rights of more than 4 million Brazilians living abroad".

==== Geneva Consensus Declaration ====
On 17 January, Lula withdrew Brazil from the Geneva Consensus Declaration on Promoting Women's Health and Strengthening the Family. Signed by Bolsonaro in 2020, the document stated that "there is no international right to abortion nor any international obligation on the part of States to finance or facilitate abortion". The document, which also limits families to only those formed by heterosexual couples, was signed by countries such as Saudi Arabia, Uganda, Egypt, Indonesia, Hungary, the United Arab Emirates, Sudan and Belarus, as well as the United States (which left the declaration in 2021), totaling 31 countries.

==== United Nations Climate Change Conference ====
On 1 November 2022, the COP27 host Egypt invited then President-elect Lula to visit the summit which raised hopes among climate activists and international organizations officials that Brazil will strengthen its environmental policies. Lula accepted the invitation and, while attending the COP27, promised to fight for a zero deforestation in the Amazon and other biomes. He also promised to have a United Nations Climate Change conference held in the Amazon. On 11 January 2023, Lula announced Brazil was making an official bid for the Brazilian city of Belém to host the COP 30. In May 2023, the UN announced that Belém had been chosen to host the summit, a first for a city in the Amazon region. During the COP28, Lula announced that Brazil would join the OPEC+ initiative, which focuses on integration and discussion between members of the group and other countries. He also announced a plan to recover degraded pasturelands, and to boost overall agriculture productivity through loans by Brazil's BNDES.

==== Mercosur and CELAC ====
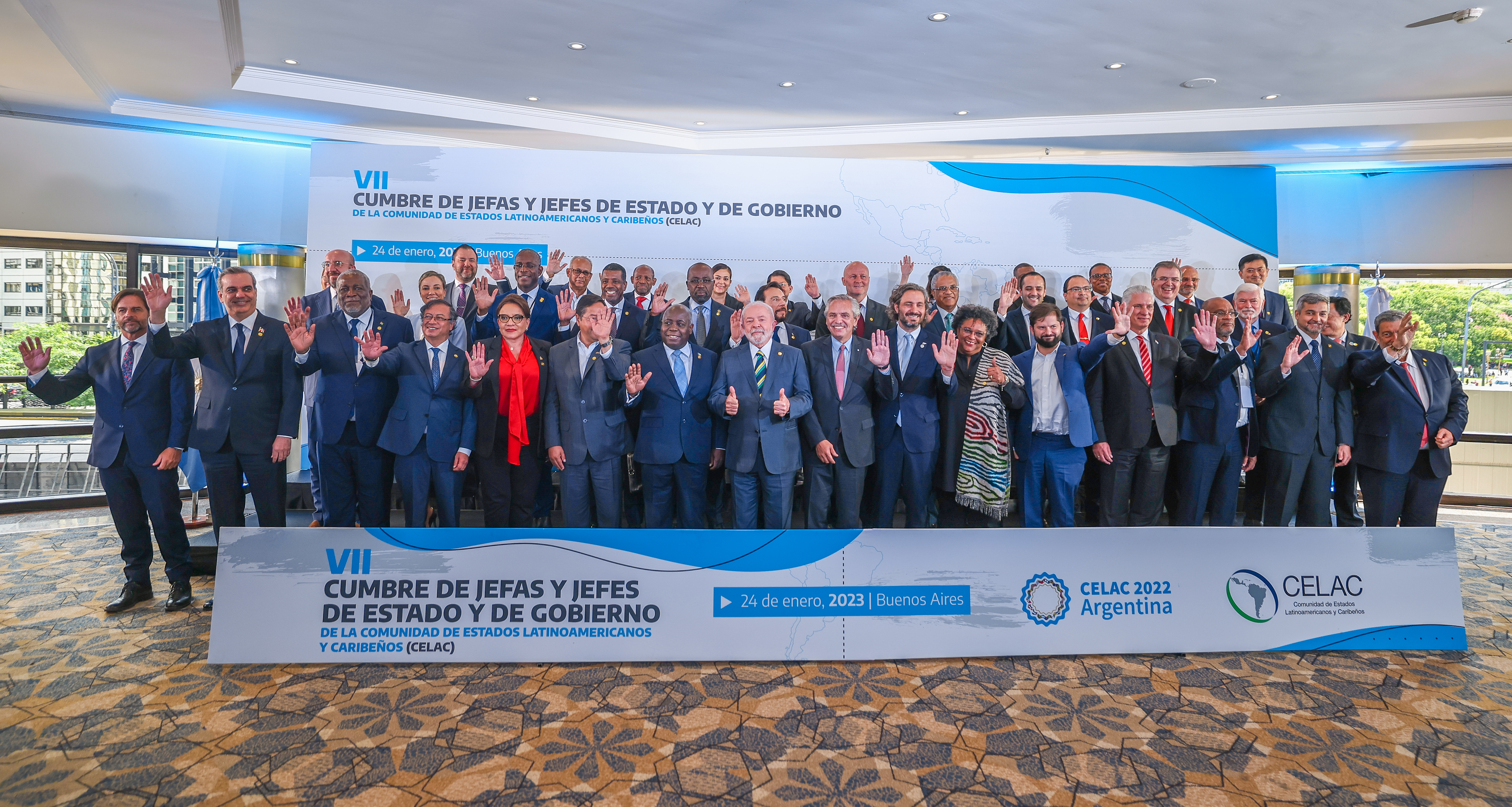
Lula and other Latin American leaders at the 7th CELAC Summit in Buenos Aires, Argentina

In January 2023, Foreign Minister Mauro Vieira announced Brazil's return to the Community of Latin American and Caribbean States (CELAC). During the 7th CELAC summit, Lula expressed support for a modernization of the South American customs union Mercosur and the creation of a common unit of account between Argentina and Brazil which other South American nations could also join to boost regional integration and skip US dollar dominance.

On 25 January, during a trip to Uruguay, Lula called for the European Union-Mercosur trade deal to be sealed and a China-Mercosur trade agreement to be explored. Lula and Uruguayan president Luis Lacalle Pou held talks over infrastructure projects to be developed in Uruguay, including a joint Uruguayan-Brazilian administration of the Rivera International Airport.

In March 2023, Uruguayan and Brazilian top officials jointly detailed the said infrastructure projects in Brasília. Brazil also invited Paraguay and Uruguay to join the works of the G20 ahead of the 2024 G20 Brazil summit, as Brazilian rotating presidency in the group was to begin on 1 December 2023.

In December 2024, during a summit in Montevideo attended by Lula and Ursula von der Leyen, Mercosur struck a definitive free trade agreement with the European Union representing nearly a quarter of the global gross domestic product (GDP).

==== Amazon Cooperation Treaty Organization ====
On 4 January 2023, it was reported that Brazil was seeking an Amazon summit between members of the Amazon Cooperation Treaty Organization (ACTO) and other non-members, which was reportedly well received by the ACTO countries. On 26 January, Lula invited French president Emmanuel Macron to attend the ACTO summit due to the French department of French Guiana location in the Amazon region.

==== BRICS Summits ====
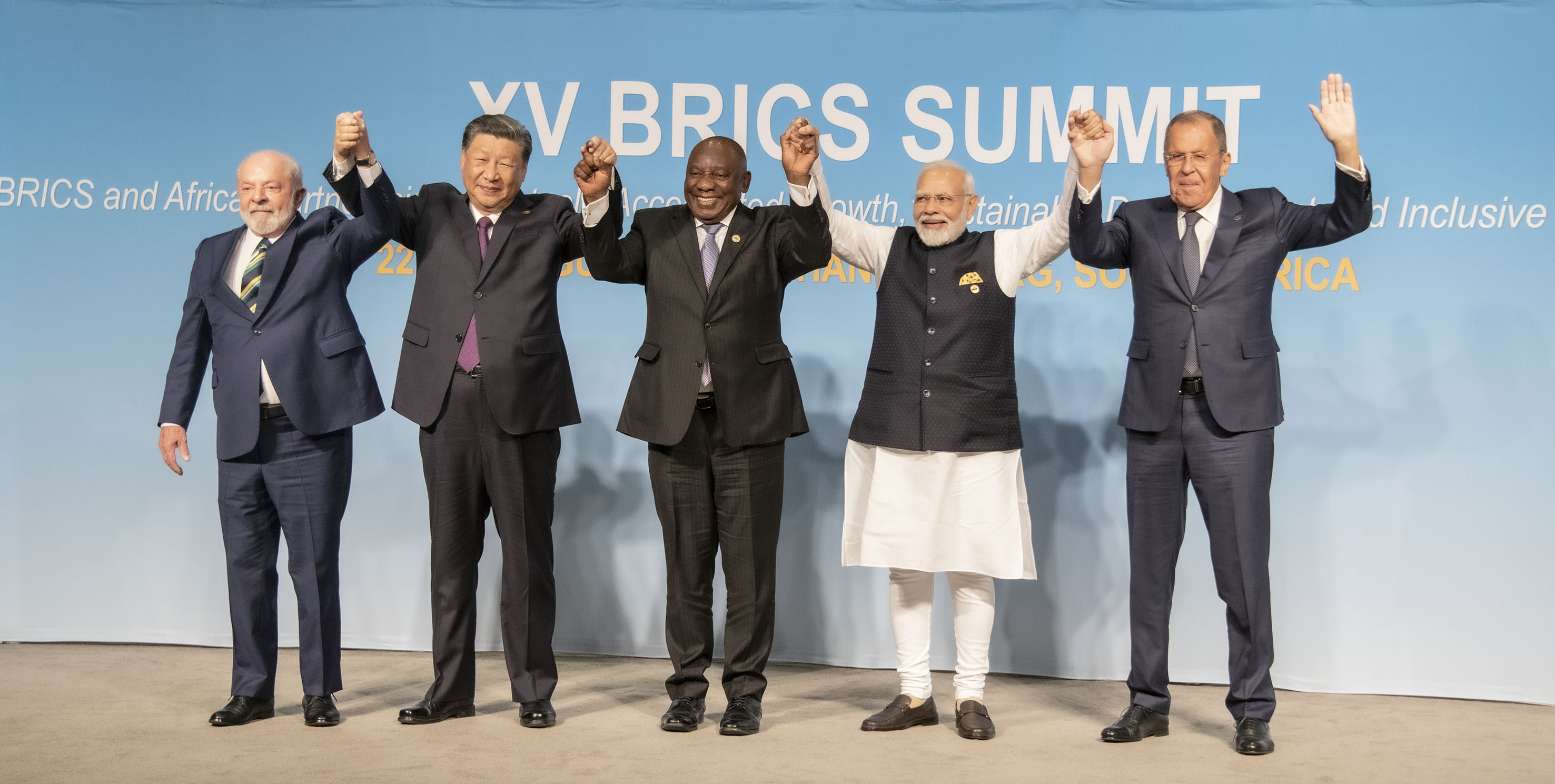
Lula and other BRICS leaders during the 15th BRICS Summit in August 2023, in Johannesburg

Lula attended the 15th BRICS summit in August 2023. During the event he spoke in favour of more countries joining the BRICS, including Brazil's neighbour Argentina and Indonesia; called for a common currency between BRICS members and said the group is not meant to challenge either the G7 or the US. Lula criticized the United Nations Security Council which he considered to be "limited" in face of the 2022 Russian invasion of Ukraine and reiterated Brazil's position of "defending sovereignty, territorial integrity" and the principles of the United Nations.

=== International aid ===
On 8 February 2023, President Lula authorized immediate emergency aid, including several Brazilian fire brigades, Brazilian Air Force air tankers and other emergency services and equipment to be sent to Chile after severe wildfires broke out across the country. In the following day, Brazil sent aid, rescue crews, including search and rescue dogs, among other equipment and staff to Turkey and Syria following the 2023 Turkey-Syria earthquake. In July 2023, Lula also sent Brazilian firefighters teams to Canada to help with the 2023 Central Canada wildfires.

=== State visits ===
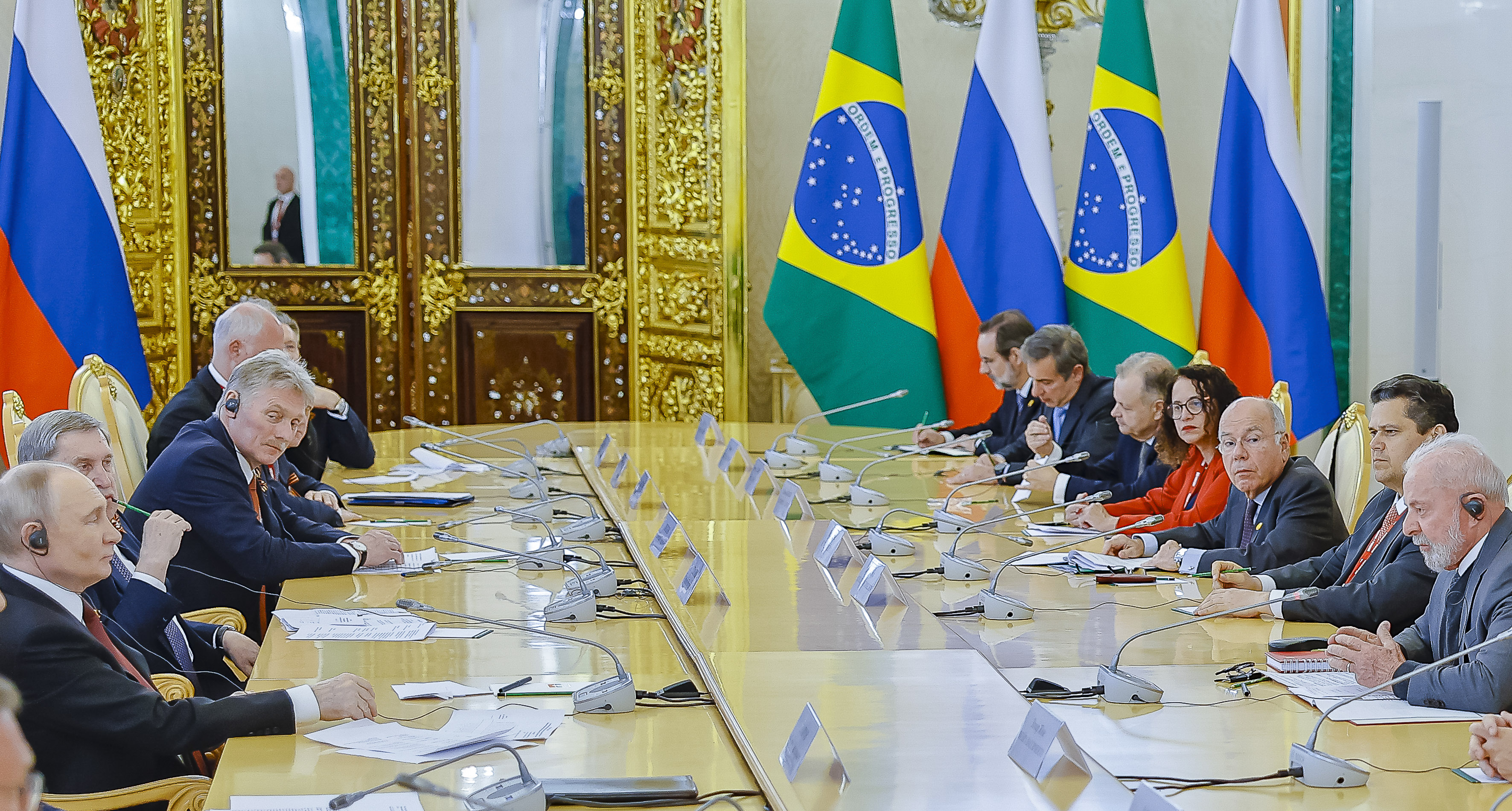
Lula and Vladimir Putin in Moscow, in May 2025

Start	End	Destination	Ref.
22 January 2023	25 January 2023	Argentina; Uruguay	
9 February 2023	11 February 2023	United States	
11 April 2023	15 April 2023	China; United Arab Emirates	
20 April 2023	26 April 2023	Spain; Portugal	
5 May 2023	6 May 2023	United Kingdom	
17 May 2023	21 May 2023	Japan	
20 June 2023	21 June 2023	Italy; Vatican City	
22 June 2023	24 June 2023	France	
3 July 2023	8 July 2023	Argentina; Colombia	
16 July 2023	19 July 2023	Belgium; Cape Verde	
22 August 2023	27 August 2023	South Africa; Angola; São Tomé and Príncipe	
9 September 2023	11 September 2023	India	
16 September 2023	21 September 2023	Cuba; United States; United Nations	
21 September 2024	1 October 2024	United States; Mexico	

== Popularity ==
=== Approval ratings ===
In a survey conducted by Ipespe/Febraban and released in February 2023, Lula's third government was rated as good or excellent by 40% of Brazilians, regular by 27%, and bad or terrible by 28%, while 5% did not respond.

In the following month, between the 2nd and 6th, Ipec conducted an analysis that was released on the 19th; in it, 41% of Brazilians rated the government as "good or excellent", 30% considered the administration "regular", and 24% thought it was "bad or terrible"; 5% did not know or preferred not to respond. In this way, Lula began his third term with higher approval than his predecessor, Jair Bolsonaro, who in March 2019 was considered "good or excellent" by 34%. Regarding confidence in Lula, 53% of the population said they trusted him, while 43% stated that they did not trust him and 4% preferred not to express an opinion. Finally, the survey found that the president's way of governing had the approval of 57% of Brazilians.

On 29 and 30 March, Datafolha interviewed 2,028 people in 126 municipalities, and the Lula government was rated as excellent or good by 38%, regular by 30%, and bad or terrible by 29% of respondents. On 23 May, according to a new survey, 54% of respondents approved of the government, while 39% of respondents disapproved of the government.

In June 2023, according to a new Ipec survey, the Lula government had the approval of 37% of the population, while 32% considered it regular, 28% disapproved of it, and 3% did not know how to answer.

Between 12 and 14 June, Datafolha interviewed another 2,010 people in 112 Brazilian municipalities, and the Lula government received a good or excellent rating from 37% of respondents, regular from 33%, and bad or terrible from 27%. Three percent of respondents did not express an opinion. According to the survey, Lula's third term maintained a good "balance" of approval and regular ratings over five months, surpassing the ratings of the previous governments of Collor, Temer and Bolsonaro, but still being surpassed by the ratings of the first-term governments of FHC and Dilma.

Between 15 and 18 June, the Genial/Quaest institute interviewed 2,029 voters over the age of 16, and the survey showed an increase in the rating from 51% to 56% again compared with the survey released in April of that year. That percentage represents those who said that Lula governs the country well, and the decrease from 42% to 40% represents those who said that Lula governs the country badly.

From the end of June to the beginning of July, Lula's third government was measured by the newspaper PoderData, with 2,500 respondents from 262 municipalities across the country, ending the first half of the year with a "balance" in approval. Fifty-one percent of respondents rated Lula's administration positively, while 43% disapproved of the administration and 6% did not know how to rate it. The newspaper also asked respondents how they rated Lula governing the country, and in 3 months the percentage for good governance rose by two points (from 39% to 41%). The percentage for terrible governance fell from 35% to 32%, and those who rated governance as regular rose from 22% to 25%.

Between 10 and 14 August, the Genial/Quaest institute carried out its fourth survey on Lula's and his government's performance, interviewing 2,029 voters, and the results were that 42% rated the Lula government positively, while 29% classified it as regular and 24% as negative. Those who did not know or did not respond accounted for 5%.

Another Ipec survey was conducted between 1 and 5 September with 2,000 voters responding in 127 municipalities, all aged over 16. Respondents who said the government was excellent or good accounted for 40% (3% higher compared with June of that year). For those who still considered it a regular government, the figure remained 32%, and those who said the government was terrible or bad accounted for 25% (3% lower). The same percentage of 3% applied to those who did not know how to rate it. The survey also showed that 56% of Brazilians approve of Lula's way of governing the country, while 39% reject it and 6% did not respond.

In a Febraban/Ipespe survey released in September 2023, the popularity of the Lula government increased by 4 percentage points, reaching 55%. Disapproval, meanwhile, fell by two percentage points, to 38%. Also, 59% of Brazilians said the country would improve by the end of the year, as opposed to 18% who were pessimistic. The highest approval rating for the government was in the Northeast (65%), among people with up to a completed elementary education (60%), those earning two minimum wages (59%), and among women (59%).

In a survey conducted by PoderData between 24 and 26 September with 2,500 people, a margin of error of 2 percentage points, and a confidence level of 95%, the government obtained 48% approval and 45% disapproval. The regions that most approve of the Lula government are the Southeast and the Northeast, and his government is more approved among younger and older poor and middle-class women. Lula as a person received 36% of mentions as excellent or good, 25% as regular, and 35% as bad or terrible. The survey also asked whether respondents liked Lula's administration more than Bolsonaro's. Forty-eight percent agreed with the statement, 40% disagreed, and 9% said there was no difference. Among evangelicals, government approval fell by two percentage points to 32%, and rejection rose to 64%. Among Catholics, approval fell by 3 percentage points to 57%, and disapproval rose to 36%.

In a survey released by Paraná Pesquisas on 13 January 2025, it was revealed that the negative evaluation of President Luiz Inácio Lula da Silva's government exceeded the positive one. According to the survey data, 11.1% of Brazilians considered the government excellent and 22.7% classified it as good, totaling 33.8% positive evaluation. On the other hand, 42.6% of respondents evaluated the government as bad (8.4%) or terrible (34.2%). In addition, 22.5% considered the federal administration regular, while 1.1% did not know or did not express an opinion. The survey was conducted with 2,018 people eligible to vote, presenting a confidence level of 95% and a margin of error of 2.2 percentage points.

The Quaest institute conducted a survey between 23 and 26 January 2025, showing that for the first time in the institute's polling Lula's disapproval surpassed his approval. Disapproval stood at 49%, while approval stood at 47%. This survey heard 4,500 voters.

In another survey conducted by PoderData between 25 and 27 January 2025, the negative evaluation of President Lula reached 40%, the highest rate since the start of his third term. Positive evaluation stood at 24%, while 33% considered his government regular. The survey also found that 51% of respondents disapproved of the president's administration, against 42% who approved of it. The loss of support was greater among voters who voted for the president, with the disapproval rate rising from 10% to 23%. In the Northeast, his main electoral stronghold, rejection increased by 8 percentage points. Economic and political factors, such as the rise of the dollar and the impact on food prices, in addition to the controversy over the "Pix taxation", contributed to the wearing down of the government's image. The survey heard 2,500 voters, with a margin of error of 2 percentage points and a confidence level of 95%.

The Latam Pulse survey, carried out by Atlasintel and released on 11 February, showed that President Lula had 45.9% approval and 51.4% disapproval, the worst mark in the historical series. Rejection is higher among men, young people aged 16 to 44, evangelicals, and residents of the Central-West, North, South, and Southeast regions. In the Northeast, the rates are balanced. The overall evaluation of the government also worsened, with 46.5% considering the administration bad or terrible. Concern about the economy doubled, being cited by 29% of Brazilians, behind only crime (58%) and corruption (49%). Inflation is the biggest economic problem, mentioned by 75% of respondents. On tax reform, 41.5% considered it progress in need of improvement, 23% saw it as progress, and 35% classified it as a setback.

The Datafolha survey, released by Folha de S.Paulo on 14 February, points to a fall in President Lula's approval, recording the lowest rate of his three terms. According to the survey, 24% of respondents rated the government as excellent or good, while 41% considered it bad or terrible. Another 32% classified the administration as regular, and 2% did not know how to respond. Compared with the previous survey, carried out in December 2024, approval fell from 35% to 24%, while disapproval increased from 34% to 41%. The fall was observed in different segments. Among voters with income of up to two minimum wages, approval fell from 44% to 29%. Among those earning more than ten minimum wages, it went from 32% to 18%. Among Catholics, the positive rating decreased from 48% to 24%, and among evangelicals, from 30% to 21%. In the Northeast, traditionally a region of greater support for the president, approval fell from 49% to 33%. The survey was carried out between 10 and 11 February, with 2,007 voters from 113 cities, and has a margin of error of two percentage points.

On 29 May, the study "Vida Digital de Lula", launched by the Ativaweb agency, identified that Lula lost one million followers on the social networks Instagram and Facebook. According to the study, the reasons would be the triggering of the INSS fraud scheme initiated in 2019 and the taxation of the Tax on Financial Operations (IOF). According to the portal O Antagonista, one of the reasons would be the embarrassments caused by first lady Janja.

The AtlasIntel survey carried out on 30 May showed that disapproval rates of Lula's government reached the record level of 53.7%, according to the survey conducted in partnership with Bloomberg. This is the highest rate of dissatisfaction with the current administration since January 2024, due to the start of the investigations into the INSS fraud scheme. Approval of the PT government remained stable at 45.5% – in April, it was 46.1%, and in March, 44.9%. The Quaest survey released on 16 July indicated a recovery in the rating, according to the survey, because the difference between approval and disapproval was 17 points in June and 10 now. Disapproval, however, remained above approval, with 53% disapproval and 43% approval.

Between 25 and 28 July, the evaluation indices of the Lula government increased and surpassed disapproval, with 50.3% approval. According to AtlasIntel/Bloomberg, the recovery in Lula's popularity ratings took place amid the firm stance adopted by the Brazilian president in the face of the increase in tariffs announced by Donald Trump, then president of the United States, and the sanctions imposed by the U.S. government on Brazil, largely articulated by Eduardo Bolsonaro.

=== Approval charts ===
Local regression chart of opinion polls on the Lula government, 2023–present

Opinion poll	Fieldwork date	Sample	Excellent/Good (%)	Regular (%)	Bad/Terrible (%)	Don't know/No response (%)	Difference (%)
AtlasIntel	22 - 27 November 2025	5510	44.4	7	48.6	0.1	4.2
CNT/MDA	19 - 23 November 2025	2002	34	29	36	1	2
Genial Quaest	6 - 9 November 2025	2004	31	28	38	3	7
Genial Quaest	2 - 5 October 2025	2004	33	27	37	3	4
Genial Quaest	12 - 14 September 2025	2004	31	28	38	3	7
AtlasIntel	20 - 25 August 2025	6238	43.7	5.1	51.2	0.1	7.5
AtlasIntel	25 - 28 July 2025	7334	46.6	5.1	48.2	0.1	1.6
Genial Quaest	29 May - 1 June 2025	2004	26	28	43	3	15
AtlasIntel	19 - 23 May 2025	4399	41.9	6	52.1	0.1	10.2
Datafolha	1 - 3 April 2025	3054	29	32	38	1	6
Genial Quaest	27 - 31 March 2025	2004	27	29	41	3	12
IPEC	7 - 11 March 2025	2000	27	30	41	2	11
CNT/MDA	19 - 23 February 2025	2002	29	26	44	1	15
Datafolha	10 - 11 February 2025	2007	24	32	41	3	9
Genial Quaest	23 - 26 January 2025	4500	31	28	37	4	6
Datafolha	12 - 13 December 2024	2002	35	29	34	2	1
IPEC	5 - 10 December 2024	2000	34	30	34	2	-
Genial Quaest	4 - 9 December 2024	8598	33	34	31	2	1
CNT/MDA	7 - 10 November 2024	2002	35	32	31	2	3
Datafolha	7 - 8 October 2024	2029	36	29	32	3	4
Genial Quaest	25 - 29 September 2024	2000	32	33	31	4	1
IPEC	5 - 9 September 2024	2000	35	28	34	3	1
Datafolha	29 - 31 July 2024	2040	35	30	33	2	2
Genial Quaest	5 - 8 July 2024	2000	36	30	30	4	6
IPEC	4 - 8 July 2024	2000	37	31	31	1	6
Datafolha	4 - 13 June 2024	2008	36	31	31	2	5
Genial Quaest	2 - 6 May 2024	2045	33	31	33	3	-
CNT/MDA	1 - 5 May 2024	2002	37	31	30	2	6
Datafolha	19 - 20 March 2024	2002	35	33	30	2	2
IPEC	1 - 5 March 2024	2000	33	33	32	2	-
Genial Quaest	25 - 27 February 2024	2000	35	28	34	3	1
CNT/MDA	18 - 21 January 2024	2002	43	28	28	1	5
Genial Quaest	14 - 18 December 2023	2012	36	32	29	3	4
Datafolha	5 December 2023	2004	38	30	30	2	8
IPEC	1 - 5 December 2023	2000	38	30	30	2	8
Genial Quaest	19 - 22 October 2023	2000	38	29	29	4	9
CNT/MDA	27 Sep - 1 October 2023	2002	41	30	27	2	11
Datafolha	12 - 13 September 2023	2016	38	30	31	1	7
IPEC	1 - 5 September 2023	2000	40	32	25	3	12
Genial Quaest	10 - 14 August 2023	2029	42	29	24	5	13
Genial Quaest	15 - 18 June 2023	2029	37	32	27	4	10
Datafolha	12 - 14 June 2023	2010	37	33	27	3	4
IPEC	1 - 5 June 2023	2000	37	32	28	3	5
CNT/MDA	11 - 14 May 2023	2002	43	28	25	4	15
Genial Quaest	13–16 April 2023	2015	36	29	29	6	7
IPEC	1 - 5 April 2023	2000	39	30	26	5	9
Datafolha	29 - 30 March 2023	2028	38	30	29	3	8
IPEC	2 - 6 March 2023	2000	41	30	24	5	11
Genial Quaest	10–13 February 2023	2016	40	24	20	16	16

== Controversies ==
=== Corruption ===
==== Appointment of ministers ====
===== Waldez Góes =====
At the beginning of January, the NGO Transparency International issued a statement criticizing the choice of Waldez Goés, former Governor of Amapá and affiliated with the PDT, as Ministry of National Integration, due to his previous prison sentence for misappropiation of public resources. On its official Twitter profile, the institution published:

This week, a man sentenced to prison for embezzlement of public resources was sworn in as Minister of National Integration. He entered through the Centrão quota, which can undermine any government, on the right or on the left. In 2019, Waldez Goés was sentenced by the STJ (Supreme Court of Justice) to 6 years in prison for embezzlement. His defence filed an appeal, which is pending at the STF (Supreme Federal Court) following a request from Minister Alexandre de Moraes. Still, despite the seriousness of the case, he was sworn in as Minister of the Lula Government.

According to several sources, Waldez was presented and nominated by Davi Alcolumbre (União Brasil), senator for Amapá and former President of the Senate from 2019 to 2021. Two days before leaving the Government of Amapá, Waldez announced work to pave a highway that connects the state capital, Macapá, to the south of the state. The work, valued at R$100 million, the most expensive of his government, was handed over to the company Reflorestadora Rio Pedreira, belonging to Breno Chaves Pinto, second deputy of senator Davi Alcolumbre, and will have the majority of its finances through resources from the "secret budget" sent by the parliamentarian himself. After taking office as minister, Waldez left his party, also denying that he would join União Brasil, contrary to the expectations of the party's parliamentarians and Alcolumbre's allies.

===== Daniela Carneiro =====
In the same month Minister of Tourism Daniela Carneiro came under scrutiny for her association with individuals believed to command militias in Rio de Janeiro.

Carneiro, a member of the Brazil Union party, had been included by the Lula government in the Ministry of Tourism in order to increase its alliance with parties of different political positions. According to a report by Veja, Daniela, the most voted federal deputy in Rio de Janeiro in 2022, was introduced to Lula by Washington Quaquá, coordinator of Lula's campaign in Rio, and was also chosen for other characteristics considered important for the PT: being a woman and evangelical. After the appointment of Daniela, previously known as Daniela do Waguinho, press outlets began publishing a series of reports showing involvement of Carneiro's political group with militias in the Baixada Fluminense, which had also previously shown involvement and links with other politicians from right-wing parties. On 3 January, g1 published a 2018 photo of Daniela alongside Juracy Alves Prudêncio, better known as Jura, a former military police sergeant identified as the leader of a militia responsible for killings in the Baixada Fluminense. Juracy appears in videos working as a campaign worker for her. He was sentenced to 26 years in prison for murder, moved to the semi-open prison regime in 2017, and went to work at the city hall of Belford Roxo, where the mayor was Wagner dos Santos Carneiro, known as Waguinho, Daniela's husband.

Two days after the controversy, Metrópoles revealed that Waguinho appointed the sister and father of third-sergeant firefighter Márcio Cardoso Pagniez, better known as Marcinho Bombeiro, a former councilor from the right- to far-right party Social Liberal Party (PSL) – Bolsonaro's former party that merged with DEM to form Brazil Union – to positions in the Belford Roxo city government. Marcinho Bombeiro had been arrested in October 2019 after the Public Prosecutor's Office of Rio de Janeiro accused him of homicide and of leading a paramilitary group operating in the Baixada Fluminense.

According to the newspaper O Globo, the minister also had contact with another militiaman who campaigned and requested photos with Daniela in 2022. This was Fábio Augusto de Oliveira Brasil, known as Fabinho Varandão. He is a defendant in court, accused of leading a paramilitary group that monopolizes illegal television and internet signals as well as the sale of cooking gas in 10 neighborhoods of Belford Roxo. Brasil participated in campaign marches and a rally for the then federal deputy candidate. On social media, he celebrated Daniela's appointment to the Ministry of Tourism. On 7 January, UOL reported that the minister's husband appointed former military police lieutenant Fernando Cardoso do Amaral and his wife Helen Borsoi Ribeiro do Amaral to commissioned positions in the Municipal Health Secretariat of Belford Roxo on 11 February 2022. Lieutenant Amaral, as he became known, was arrested in December 2011 accused of participating in an extermination group operating in Belford Roxo.

Two other militiamen were identified as supporters of Daniela Carneiro's campaign. One of them is Cristiano de Oliveira Gouveia, known as Babu, who in a video posted on a social network appears with a sticker displaying Daniela's number. In addition, Babu appears on stage at a rally alongside Daniela and other candidates during the October elections. The other is Eduardo Araújo, a Belford Roxo councilor who was suspended after being appointed municipal secretary of Sustainable Energy of Belford Roxo. Eduardo participated in campaign motorcades with Daniela. The Public Prosecutor's Office says he was responsible for preventing the arrest of other members of the gang.

Daniela Carneiro denied such involvement, stating that she does not condone "any illicit act" and that it is up to the courts to "judge and punish"; she also stated that she received support from numerous voters from various municipalities during her campaign.

Deputy Marcelo Freixo, who gained notoriety by presiding over the CPI das Milícias in Rio de Janeiro, was appointed president of Embratur, an agency subordinate to the Ministry of Tourism. When questioned about the relationship, Freixo said that "it was up to her [Daniela] to speak about it" and that "my relationship with her is very recent, but very good and full of dialogue".

On 16 February, Lula minimized the minister's links with militias in an interview with CNN Brasil, describing the case only as a "photograph":

She appeared in a truck there with a militia guy. Honestly, if we take into account people who appear in photographs next to other people, we will not talk to anyone, because I am the guy who takes the most photographs in the world.

On 3 March, Lula said in an interview with journalist Reinaldo Azevedo on BandNews FM that he felt "gratitude" toward Daniela because of the support she gave him in the presidential elections. In addition, he stated that the minister would be dismissed from office "if the link with militias goes beyond photos":

For now I think it is no more than that. If evidence appears that it is [greater than a photo], she will leave the government.

After disagreements with leaders of her own party and requesting disaffiliation from Brazil Union, Daniela was dismissed from the Ministry of Tourism at the party's request and on 14 July was replaced by federal deputy Celso Sabino (UNIÃO/PA). However, on 29 September, Daniela, now affiliated with Republicanos, was appointed vice leader of the government in the Congress.

===== Juscelino Filho =====
After having strongly criticized the secret budget, a controversial legislative practice initiated during the Jair Bolsonaro government that consists of allocating funds from the public budget to projects defined by parliamentarians with little transparency, Lula appointed Juscelino Filho, affiliated with União Brasil, to the Ministry of Communications. From the end of January onward, a series of allegations fell upon the minister.

It was found that Juscelino had used 5 million reais from the Secret Budget for his own benefit, carrying out an asphalt paving project in front of his farm that benefits at least eight people connected to him in Vitorino Freire, a municipality of Maranhão previously governed by his father and currently governed by his sister, where about one-third of the population lives on dirt roads.

Another accusation against Juscelino is related to the falsification of information regarding the payment of 385 thousand reais in air taxi services during the 2022 electoral campaign. The information was published by the newspaper O Estado de S. Paulo. Juscelino informed the Superior Electoral Court that he made 23 trips through the company Rotorfly Taxi Aéreo from August to September 2022 during the campaign. In the accounting of expenses, it is stated that three alleged campaign workers carried out the trips.

In addition, Juscelino is suspected of having favored the contractor Engefort in a public works project of the Codevasf. The Federal Court of Accounts points to the construction company as the main beneficiary of an alleged cartel scheme of paving companies in Codevasf initiated during the Bolsonaro government.

Another controversy involving the name of Juscelino Filho was his omission to the Superior Electoral Court in 2022 of 2.2 million reais in pedigree horses in his campaign declaration for federal deputy. In addition, in the late afternoon of Thursday, 26 January, he used an aircraft of the Brazilian Air Force to depart from Brasília bound for São Paulo on a trip that he justified as urgent. His official commitments lasted 2 hours and 30 minutes, but the trip extended until 30 January. During that weekend, the minister, passionate about horses, devoted himself to an entirely private agenda: he advised buyers of animals, promoted one of his own, participated in pedigree horse auctions, received the "Oscar" of breeders, and inaugurated a square in honor of a horse belonging to his partner.

In response to Estadão, the Ministry of Communications released a statement with its position regarding the trip. The statement affirms that the minister had official commitments during the trip to the state of São Paulo:

The minister fulfilled an official agenda on 26 and 27 January, participating in meetings with the operator Claro, where the company's investment plan in the country was presented; [he also participated in] a technical meeting with the team of the regional office of the affiliated Telebrás; a meeting with the regional manager of the affiliated agency Anatel; and [participated in] a visit and meeting with the BYD group in SP.

In an exclusive interview with journalist Reinaldo Azevedo on BandNews FM, Lula declared:

I tried this week to talk with Juscelino; minister Juscelino is traveling, he is abroad on ministry business discussing at the telecommunications meeting. I have already asked minister Rui Costa to summon him for Monday so that we can have a conversation because he has the right to prove his innocence, but if he cannot prove his innocence he cannot remain in the government. I guarantee everyone the presumption of innocence.

Pressured by allies and opponents regarding the permanence or dismissal of the minister, the president met with Juscelino on 6 March to demand explanations from him regarding the accusations. After the meeting, Lula decided to keep the minister. On his official Twitter profile, Juscelino published:

I have just left the Palácio do Planalto, where I had a very positive meeting with president Lula. On the occasion, I clarified the unfounded accusations made against me and detailed some of the many projects and actions of the Ministry of Communications. We have much work ahead.

==== "Traffic Lady" case ====
In November 2023, a report by Estadão disclosed that a member of the Comando Vermelho, Luciane Farias, known as the "Amazonian traffic lady", attended the Ministry of Justice on two occasions, without a record in the official schedules, being received, according to the ministry, by secretaries of Flávio Dino, Minister of Justice. On the second occasion, her daily allowances and tickets were paid by the Ministry of Human Rights, costing R$5,909.07 to the public coffers, later confirmed by the ministry itself.

Luciane is married to Clemilson dos Santos Farias, "Tio Patinhas", one of the leaders of the Comando Vermelho in Amazonas. She was convicted on appeal to ten years in prison for association for trafficking, money laundering, and formation of a criminal organization. After the publication of the report, the ministry established stricter rules for access control, making prior verification of the criminal records of those entering the building for meetings with authorities necessary.

Journalist Andreza Matais, responsible for the story, was the victim of virtual lynching by supporters of the government, in retaliation for the report.

The National Association of Newspapers spoke about the case in a statement:

The ANJ follows with concern and expresses its repudiation of attempts at intimidation against O Estado de S.Paulo and its Politics editor, Andreza Matais, after the newspaper disclosed the access of the wife of a leader of organized crime in Amazonas to offices of the Ministry of Justice.

The use of intimidation methods against outlets and journalists is not consistent with democratic values and demonstrates blatant disrespect for freedom of the press. It also shows a practice characteristic of autocratic regimes of, with the support of political leaders, pro-government sites and influencers, attempting to divert attention from uncomfortable reporting by attacking those who investigate and disclose it.

The ANJ expects such intimidation methods, especially against women journalists already employed in the recent past, to cease immediately, in the name of respect for freedom of the press and the free exercise of journalism and communication outlets.

National Association of Newspapers - ANJ

==== Operation Sem Desconto ====
On 23 April 2025, the Federal Police (PF) and the Comptroller General of the Union (CGU) launched Operation Sem Desconto, to combat a criminal scheme that, since 2019, had been promoting the diversion of more than 6.3 billion reais from retirement and pension payments made by the National Institute of Social Security (INSS), by using entities constituted solely for the purpose of including payroll deductions directly in the payment of their benefits, without the beneficiary's authorization.

The legal authorization for deduction of association dues directly from payments to retirees and pensioners has existed since 1991. According to the CGU and the Ministry of Justice and Public Security, class entities, such as associations and unions, formalized Technical Cooperation Agreements (ACT) with the INSS, which justified payroll deductions from the agency's beneficiaries. However, the authorization for the deductions was, in many cases, forged. In this way, the CGU began a series of investigations after identifying the surge in the collection of the entities and in the deducted amounts from 2023 onward. Among the reasons for the increase in deductions are the loosening of rules, motivated by lobbies in the National Congress, failures by the INSS in control and oversight, and political appointments to the agency. Most of the deductions investigated by the operation could have begun as early as 2016 (the last year of the Dilma Roussef government), with many of them also continuing through the presidencies of Michel Temer and Bolsonaro; some deductions were even reported to be occurring up until 2024 (the second year of Lula's administration), when the scheme was first reported to the CGU.

The entity that received the most values transferred by the INSS was the National Confederation of Workers in Agriculture (CONTAG), suspected by the PF of diverting 2 billion reais from retirees and pensioners since 2019. One of the entities involved, the National Union of Retirees, Pensioners and the Elderly, has as its vice president Lula's brother José Ferreira da Silva (also known as Frei Chico), who had previously been investigated in Operation Car Wash.

Despite warnings made by an INSS advisor as early as 2023 to the Minister of Social Security, Carlos Lupi, no concrete measures were adopted to curb the fraudulent deductions. By judicial decision, the president of the INSS, Alessandro Stefanutto, appointed in July 2023 in place of Glauco Wamburg, who was serving as interim president of the institution, was removed from the exercise of the function, along with other INSS authorities. Subsequently, after the removal, they were dismissed by Lula.

=== Economy ===
==== Taxation of e-commerce ====
In early 2023 the government announced plans to remove tax exemptions for international purchases up to US$50 between individuals. After negative reactions the government maintained the rule, but later introduced the “Remessa Conforme” program in August 2023.

==== Government and state enterprises budget deficits ====
The year 2023 ended with a primary deficit of 230 billion reais, the second worst in history, behind only 2020, the year of the COVID-19 pandemic. According to Haddad, the result was increased, in part, by the decision to immediately pay the stock of court orders not paid during the Jair Bolsonaro Government, amounting to 92 billion Reals. Later, in 2024, According to the Central Bank of Brazil, federal state-owned enterprises recorded major losses during that year, totalling around 6.7 billion reais, the largest deficit in 23 years.

==== Fake news about the alleged "Taxation of Pix" ====
At the beginning of January 2025, a regulation (IN RFB No. 2219/2024) entered into force, which changed the way the Federal Revenue of Brazil monitors transactions via Pix and credit card in order to reinforce the fight against illicit operations. With this measure, all financial institutions, including digital banks and payment apps, became obliged to report monthly movements above 5,000 reais for individuals and 15,000 for companies. The Revenue Service stressed that financial transactions would not suffer increases in taxes, only that they would be subject to additional inspection to monitor atypical movements, such as the non-declaration of income tax by individuals who move more than 5,000 reais monthly. Since 2003, financial monitoring has been carried out through Decred (current e-Financeira), the Revenue Service system that tracks transactions made with credit cards. With the regulation that entered into force in 2025, monitoring was expanded to include transactions via Pix, sales made through card readers, payments with debit cards, store cards and virtual currencies, movements that would be reported to the Federal Revenue Service.

However, with the beginning of the inspection, fake news about the alleged taxation of Pix began circulating on social media. According to the false information, the Federal Revenue Service would create or increase taxation on the system, which would lead companies to pass on the costs to consumers. The fake news, fueled by disinformation, mainly from right-wing figures such as Nikolas Ferreira, which circulated widely, was denied both by the government and by the Federal Revenue Service, the Central Bank, and news outlets.

Despite the denials, the negative repercussions affected users' confidence, resulting in the biggest drop in the use of Pix since the creation of the system. Between 4 and 10 January 2025, 1.25 billion reais in Pix transactions were carried out, a reduction of almost 11% compared with December. This was the largest monthly drop recorded since January 2022. However, according to the Central Bank, the drop was not related to the wave of fake news, but rather to Christmas.

On 15 January 2025, after the negative repercussions, the Minister of Finance, Fernando Haddad, announced that the government would revoke the act that expanded the oversight of the Federal Revenue Service over the new financial transactions. Haddad also stated that the president would sign a provisional measure to guarantee that Pix cannot be taxed.

Later, the Federal Revenue Service pointed out that the revocation of the oversight weakened the monitoring of financial operations and favored organized crime organizations, and Robinson Barreirinhas, special secretary of the agency, stated that the Federal Revenue Service suffered "the greatest attack in its history" when he wrote: "We published this instruction in September of last year [2024], to take effect from January. What happened in January we all know. The Federal Revenue Service received the greatest attack in its history, of lies, of fake news, falsely saying that that normative instruction dealt with taxation of means of payment".

In August, the Federal Police (PF) launched Operations Carbono Oculto, Quasar and Tank against a multibillion-real scheme of fraud in the fuel sector and money laundering, revealing that the First Capital Command (PCC) and companies in the financial market used fintechs and transactions via PIX to move and conceal large sums. According to the investigation, the absence of oversight, intensified by the disinformation that circulated on social media about the new Federal Revenue Service oversight rule that would be implemented at the beginning of the year but was revoked due to fake news, facilitated the criminal group's activity. Later, deputies requested the investigation of Nikolas over the video in which he criticized the new oversight of financial movements via Pix.

"These fake news were so strong that, despite all the effort of the Federal Revenue Service, we could not overcome these lies, because of the strength of those who boosted them. [...] And today's operations show who gained from these lies, from these fake news". — Robinson Barreirinhas, special secretary of the Federal Revenue Service.

==== Privatization of waterways in the North, Recife Metro and COMPESA ====
In June 2025, the Lula government, despite strong popular opposition, supported the privatization of the Recife Metro and of the COMPESA (the Pernambuco sanitation company responsible for water supply in the state), measures announced by the governor of Pernambuco, Raquel Lyra. In both cases, the BNDES, under the leadership of Aloizio Mercadante, organized the studies to make the privatization process feasible and will also conduct the bidding procedures. In late May, the chief of staff, Rui Costa, had already confirmed that the Recife Metro would be privatized, continuing a process initiated in 2019 during the Jair Bolsonaro administration. The argument used by the government to justify the measure is that the metro system generates only financial losses. The decision prompted protests in Pernambuco, especially in Recife. In addition, in September 2025 the government included the waterway of the Madeira River and the waterways of the Tocantins and Tapajós rivers in the National Privatization Program (PND), a measure that also received criticism.

During the 2022 presidential campaign and in government, Lula strongly criticized the privatizations carried out by the previous administration and even promised that the Recife Metro would not be privatized. The privatization measures were criticized especially by the more radical sectors of the Brazilian left, which also criticized the government's attempt to soften the term “privatization” by presenting them as “concessions”.

=== January 8 Brasilia attacks ===
==== Dismissal of the Chief Minister of the Institutional Security Office after the attacks ====
The current Lula government, which began in January 2023, faced its first crisis with the fall of the chief minister of the Institutional Security Office (GSI), General Gonçalves Dias. The crisis was triggered by the release of images of the invasion of the Presidential Palace that occurred on 8 January by CNN Brasil, which raised doubts about the performance of the agency during the coup attack. The images showed collaborative action by agents with coup plotters and the presence of General Gonçalves Dias at the scene. The relationship between president Lula and the general was longstanding, with Gonçalves Dias acting as the PT leader's security chief during his first two terms. The minister's fall was accepted by Lula after an emergency meeting at the Palácio do Planalto, where ministers assessed that the images were impactful and made it evident that the general's performance had been below what was expected for the security of the presidential palace.

=== Healthcare ===
==== Creation of areas for therapeutic communities ====
Under pressure from religious entities, Lula created a Department of Support for Therapeutic Communities aimed at the treatment of chemically dependent people. After the measure was criticized by organizations linked to human rights, the Ministry of Development and Social Assistance, Family and Fight Against Hunger announced that it would review the decision. The Brazilian Mental Health Association had also spoken out against the measure in a note of repudiation.

==== Authorization of ozone therapy ====
In August 2023, Lula sanctioned Law No. 14,648, which authorizes ozone therapy in the national territory. The sanction was countersigned only by the Minister of Justice, Flávio Dino, not receiving the signature of the Minister of Health, Nísia Trindade, who recommended its veto, and it was received as denialism toward science, since the practice lacks scientific proof.

==== Dengue epidemic ====
In 2024, the number of deaths from dengue in the country surged (6,041), an increase of 400% compared with 2023 (1,179), surpassing the deaths from COVID-19 (5,960) in that year (2024). Dengue deaths in 2024 exceeded the total for the previous eight years (4,992). The explosion in dengue cases led opposition deputies from the PL to nickname Lula "presidengue" and share false and exaggerated data about the number of deaths resulting from this small-scale epidemic.

=== Use of government benefits ===
==== Leisure trips paid with public money ====
Ministers Anielle Franco (Racial Equality) and André Fufuca (Sports) turned the final of the 2023 Copa do Brasil, in São Paulo, into an official event (signing of a protocol of intentions with the CBF) and used a jet of the Brazilian Air Force to attend the final, accompanied by their advisers, who received daily allowances as a result of the trip. Sílvio Almeida (Human Rights) also attended, but used a commercial flight for his travel. During the event, the head of the Special Advisory Office of the Ministry of Racial Equality, Marcelle Decothé, made Instagram posts with racially offensive content that drew attention to the expressive number of international trips by the minister and her advisory staff over a period of 9 months: United States (three times), Portugal, Spain, Colombia, South Africa and Angola, consuming a good part of the ministry's budget. Marcelle Decothé was dismissed from her commissioned position.

Márcio Macêdo, minister of the General Secretariat of the Presidency of the Republic, traveled in November 2023 accompanied by subordinates to take part in an "out-of-season carnival" party in Aracaju, his electoral stronghold. The trip was made with public resources, under the allegation of an official commitment in the neighboring city. The party was recorded by the official photographer of the Presidency of the Republic and included the participation of Lurian, Lula's daughter. The Federal Prosecution Office by the Court of Accounts requested that the TCU investigate a possible irregularity in the use of public resources for the leisure trip.

After the controversy, Macêdo replaced the ministry's executive secretary. Maria Coelho, then the secretary at the time, refused to authorize the use of public money for the out-of-season carnival trip, so the minister himself allegedly signed the authorization; thus, Maria resigned from the position under the argument of "differences with the head of the ministry". The new secretary is Kelli Mafort, former coordinator of the MST.

==== Maintenance of the secret budget ====
During the electoral campaign, Lula repeatedly criticized the practice of the National Congress of allocating an increasingly relevant portion of the Union Budget to rapporteur's amendments, which critics called the secret budget, due to the lack of transparency regarding the amounts of each transfer and the names of the parliamentarians involved, and which was used by the Bolsonaro government to gather political support in parliament.

After the election, Lula used his influence with the Supreme Federal Court to obtain a decision declaring the secret budget unconstitutional, by a narrow majority. At the time, the president of the Chamber of Deputies, Arthur Lira, alleged that he had seen Lula's interference in the vote of Ricardo Lewandowski, who after his retirement was invited to join the government as Minister of Justice.

Despite the declaration of unconstitutionality, the National Congress continued in 2023 and 2024 with the same level of control over the budget, without transparency, replacing rapporteur's amendments with committee amendments and Pix amendments. In 2024, the non-transparent amendments will pay almost 25 billion reais.

==== Corporate card ====
According to the Federal Court of Accounts (TCU), between January 2023 and April 2025 more than 55 million reais were spent by the Presidency with corporate cards. According to VEJA, of the entire amount, 99.55 percent are expenses classified as confidential, which prevents oversight bodies from evaluating how the amounts are being spent.

=== Controversial comments ===
==== Sexist remarks ====
On several occasions throughout his third term, Lula, speaking extemporaneously, made comments which were largely regarded as sexist. In May 2024, while announcing measures for those affected by the floods in Rio Grande do Sul, he said that "a washing machine is a very important thing for women". The next day, at a ceremony for the delivery of housing units, he said he had spoken with a 27-year-old woman with 5 children, and asked "When are you going to close the gate, comrade?".

At a meeting held in the Palácio do Planalto in July 2024, Lula commented on the result of a study that found that violence against women increases after football matches, concluding: "Unbelievable. If the guy is a Corinthians supporter, that's fine". At the event marking the 2 years since the January 8 attacks, he said "I am a lover of democracy, I am not even a husband, I am a lover of democracy, because, most of the time, lovers are more passionate about their lovers than about their wives".

In March 2025, at a ceremony at the Palácio do Planalto, Lula said that he had appointed a "beautiful woman" as Minister of Institutional Relations to get closer to the presidents of the Senate and the Chamber. At the opening of the 29th International Construction and Architecture Fair, held in April 2025, Lula referred disparagingly to the managing director of the International Monetary Fund, Kristalina Georgieva, calling her "a little woman".

==== Comment about drug traffickers ====
On 24 October 2025, president Lula made a controversial statement during an interview with the press in Jakarta, Indonesia, at the end of his visit to the Asian country. Asked about statements by Donald Trump, the president stated that traffickers are "victims of users" and suggested that it would be "easier", for both Brazil and the United States, to "combat addicts".

Lula's statement, made during the early hours in Brasília time, had wide negative repercussions and was the target of criticism from opposition parliamentarians.

On the same day, hours after the repercussions, Lula retracted on X (formerly Twitter) and stated that his declaration had been a "poorly worded sentence".

== See also ==
- First presidency of Lula da Silva
- List of executive orders by Lula da Silva
- Lulism
- Politics of Brazil
