= Marsilac =

District of São Paulo, Brazil

Coordinates: 23.887°S 46.714°W

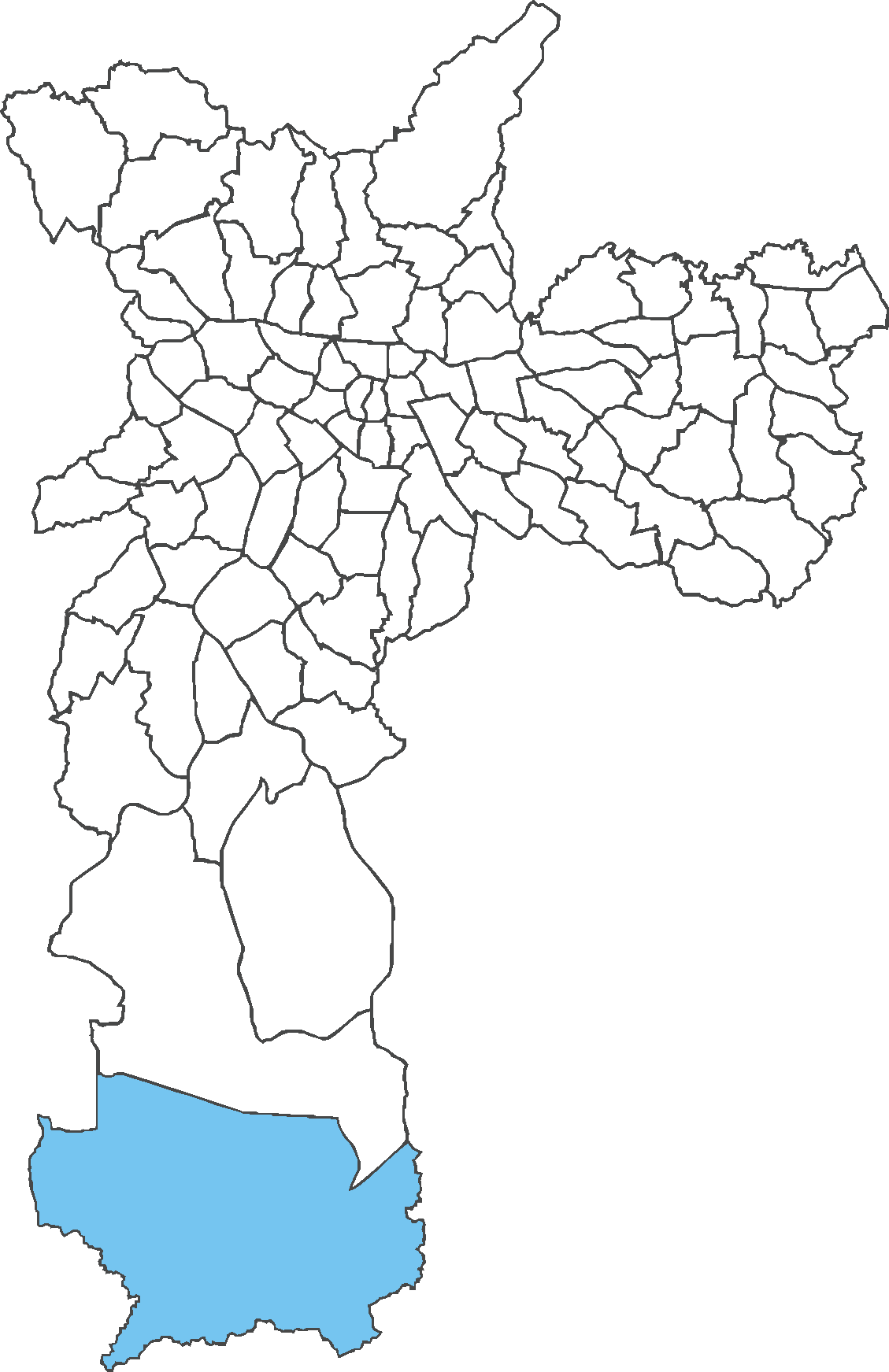
- Location of Marsilac in São Paulo
- Country: Brazil
- State: São Paulo
- Municipality: São Paulo
- Subprefecture: Parelheiros

Area
  - Total: 200 km^{2} (77 sq mi)

Population (2007)
  - Total: 8,258
  - Density: 41/km^{2} (110/sq mi)
- Website: Subprefecture of Parelheiros

Marsilac is one of 96 districts of São Paulo, Brazil, located in the extreme south tip of the city in the subprefecture of Parelheiros. Its name is a tribute to engineer Jose Alfredo Marsilac, who developed many techniques for building roads and tunnels, even after losing 99% of his vision from being hit by a bomb in the Revolution of 1932.

== History ==
Early settlement of the area owed mainly to the construction of the Mairinque–Santos by Estrada de Ferro Sorocabana connecting Mairinque and Santos, completed in 1935. Along its extension, there were three stations in the district: Engineer Marsilac (which gave name to the surrounding neighborhood and later to its own district), Evangelista de Souza, and Rio de Campos.

== Features ==
Located near the Serra do Mar and almost entirely rural, Marsilac has the largest land area of the municipality, equivalent to all of the municipality's central area. It also has the lowest population density of all the districts, largely covered by reserves of the Atlantic Forest.

This is the most remote district of the capital, located about 60–70 kilometers from Marco Zero and only about 10–15 km from the Atlantic Ocean, which is visible from some points. It borders the municipalities of São Vicente and Itanhaém. A tiny area of the town lies at sea level, located in the Capivari River valley.

It is the poorest district and has the lowest Human Development Index (HDI) of the city of São Paulo.

== Adjacent districts and municipalities ==
- Parelheiros (North)
- Municipality of São Bernardo do Campo (East)
- City of Itanhaém and São Vicente (South)
- City of Juquitiba and Embu-Guaçu (West)

== Neighborhoods of Marsilac ==
- Banhado
- Bela Vista
- Capivari
- Cipó do Meio
- Chácara Sanni
- Embura
- Parque Florestal Paulista
- Chácara Galo Azul
- Parque Internacional
- Chácara Itajaá
- Mambu
- Engenheiro Marsilac
- Evangelista de Sousa
- Gramado
- Jardim dos Eucaliptos
- Paiol
- Ponte Alta

== See also ==
- Roman Catholic Diocese of Santo Amaro
- Line 9 (CPTM) of Train
- Railway Line Santos-Jundiaí
- Colônia crater
- Guarapiranga reservoir
- Parelheiros-Itanhaém Highway 57
