= Diocese of Campo Limpo =

Catholic ecclesiastical territory

Diocese of Campo Limpo Dioecesis Campi Limpidi Diocese de Campo Limpo

Catholic
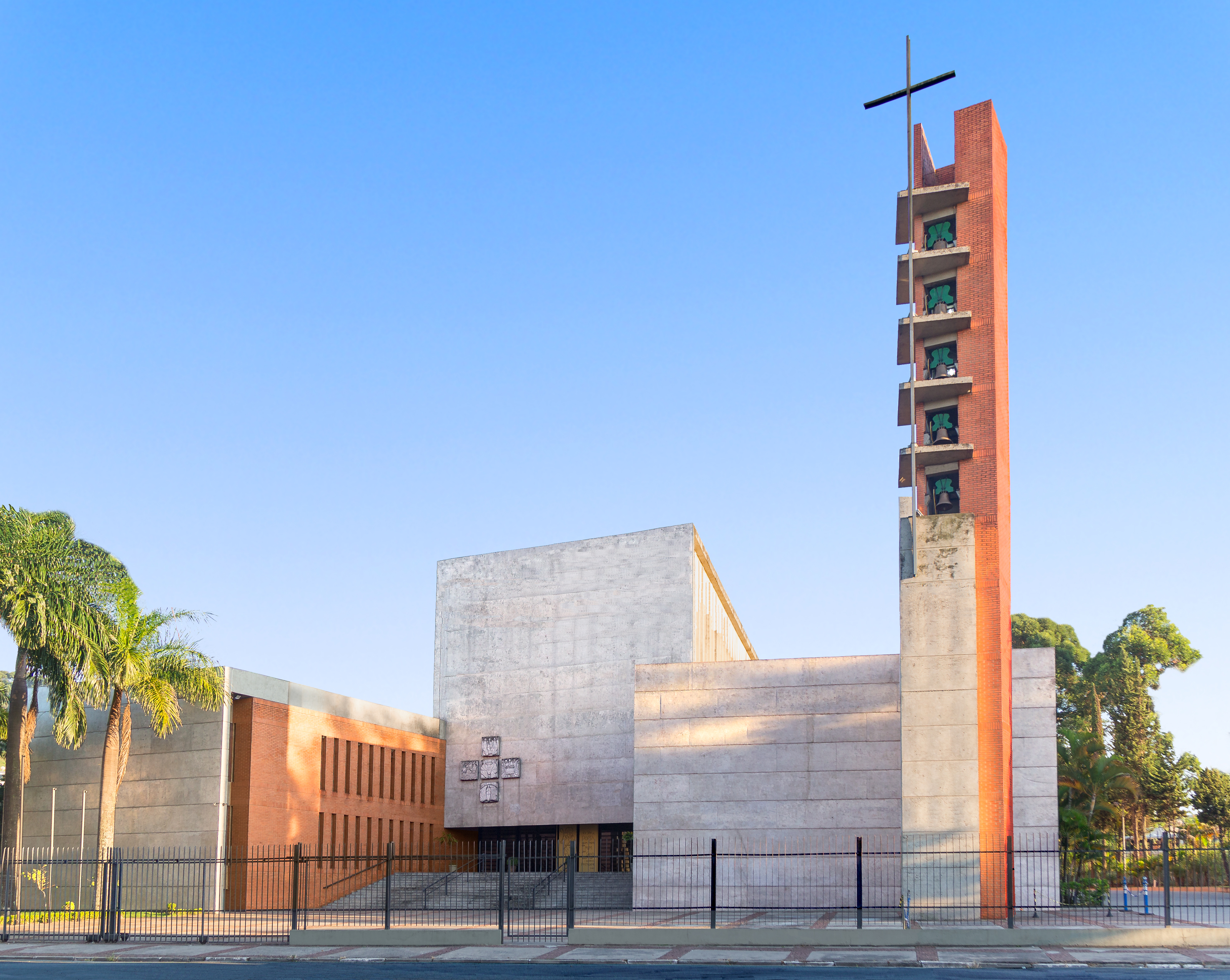
- Cathedral Shrine of the Holy Family, São Paulo

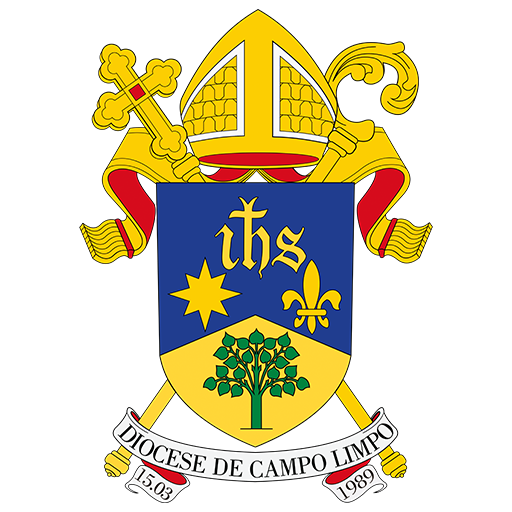
- Coat of arms

Location
- Country: Brazil
- Territory: Municipalities of Embu das Artes, Embu-Guaçu, Itapecerica da Serra, Juquitiba, São Lourenço da Serra, Taboão da Serra, and the southern districts of the city of São Paulo
- Ecclesiastical province: São Paulo
- Metropolitan: Archdiocese of São Paulo
- Headquarters: Rua Campina Grande, 400, Jardim Bom Refúgio, São Paulo
- Coordinates: 23.6310°S 46.7749°W

Statistics
- Area: 1,560 km^{2} (600 sq mi)
- Population: Total; Catholics: (as of 2016); 3,309,000; 3,022,000 (91.3%)
- Parishes: 112

Information
- Rite: Latin Rite
- Established: 15 March 1989 (37 years ago)
- Cathedral: Catedral Santuário Sagrada Família

Current leadership
- Pope: Leo XIV
- Bishop: Valdir José de Castro, S.S.P.
- Metropolitan Archbishop: Odilo Scherer
- Bishops emeritus: Emílio Pignoli; Luiz Antônio Guedes

Map
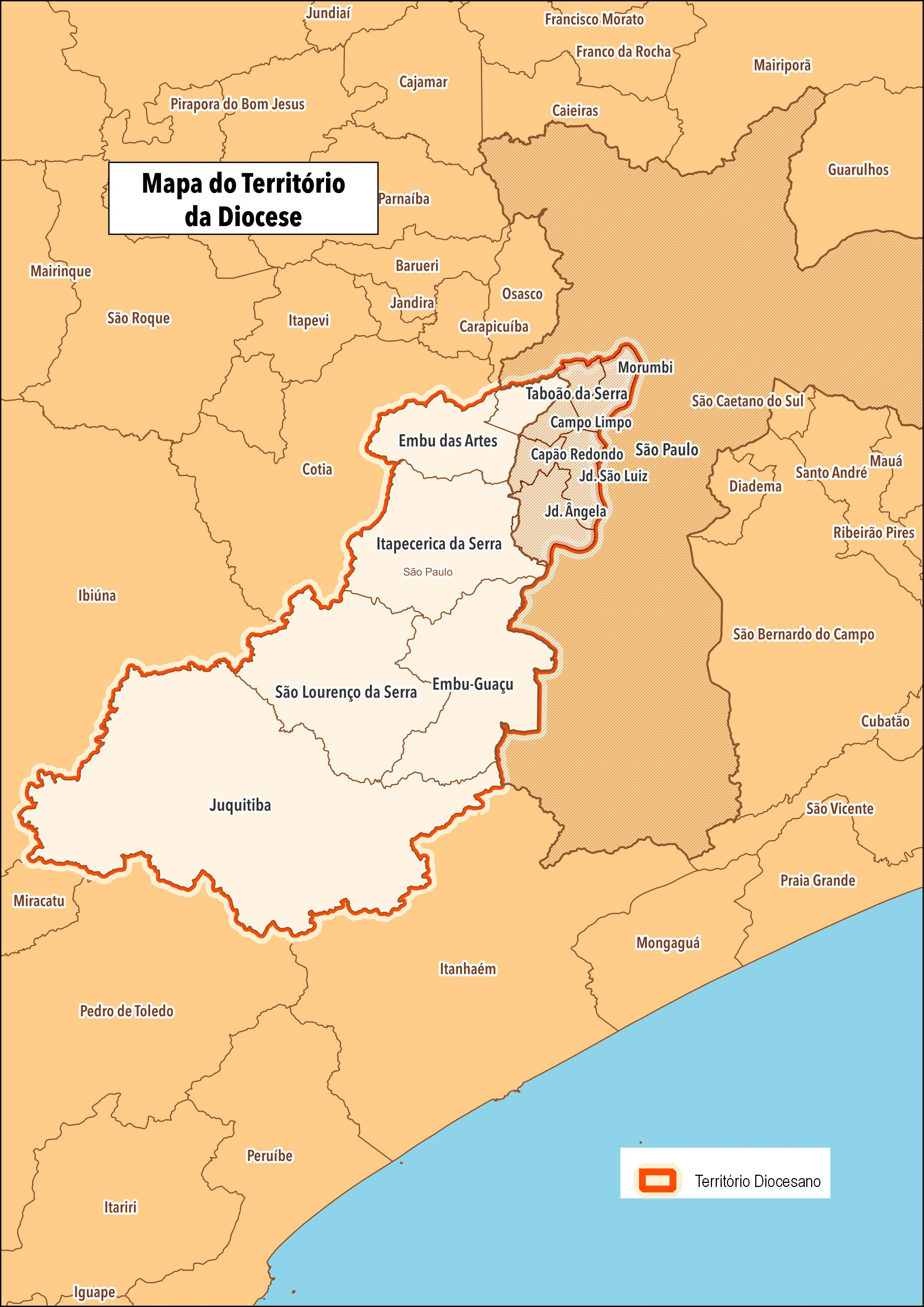
- Territory of the diocese within the Archdiocese of São Paulo

The Diocese de Campo Limpo (Latin: Dioecesis Campi Limpidi) is a Latin Church ecclesiastical territory of the Catholic Church in the state of São Paulo, Brazil. It is a suffragan see of the Metropolitan Archdiocese of São Paulo. The diocese was erected on 15 March 1989 by Pope John Paul II through the apostolic constitution Com o Beneplácito de Deus.

The territory of the diocese comprises several neighborhoods in the southern and western zones of the municipality of São Paulo — including Campo Limpo, Butantã, Morumbi, Jardim São Luís, Capão Redondo, and Jardim Ângela — together with the municipalities of Embu das Artes, Embu-Guaçu, Itapecerica da Serra, Juquitiba, São Lourenço da Serra, and Taboão da Serra.

The first Bishop of Campo Limpo was the Most Reverend Emilio Pignoli, who led the diocese from 1989 until 2008. He was succeeded by the Most Reverend Luís Antônio Guedes, who served as diocesan bishop from July 2008 until September 2022. On 14 September 2022, Pope Francis appointed the Most Reverend Valdir José de Castro as the third Bishop of Campo Limpo; he was installed in the see on 26 November 2022.

== History ==
- 15 March 1989: Established as Diocese of Campo Limpo from the Metropolitan Archdiocese of São Paulo

== Leadership ==
- Bishops of Campo Limpo (Roman rite)
  - Bishop Emílio Pignoli (15 March 1989 – 30 July 2008)
  - Bishop Luiz Antônio Guedes (30 July 2008 – 14 September 2022)
  - Bishop Valdir José de Castro, S.S.P. (14 September 2022 – present)
