= Subprefecture of Parelheiros =

Coordinates: 23°51′S 46°44′W

- Subprefecture
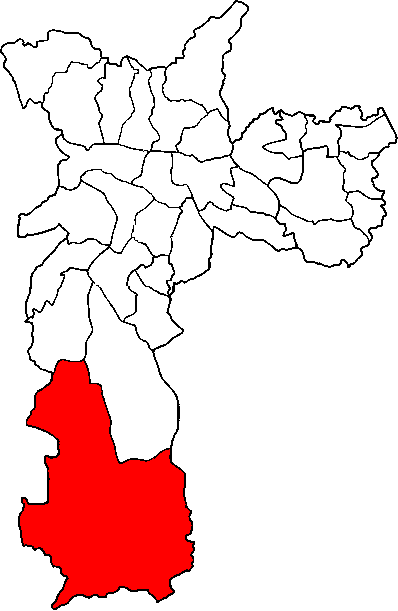
- Location of the Subprefecture of Parelheiros in São Paulo

- Location of municipality of São Paulo within the State of São Paulo
- Country: Brazil
- Region: Southeast
- State: São Paulo
- Municipality: São Paulo
- Administrative Zone: South
- Districts: Parelheiros, Marsilac

Government
  - Type: Subprefecture
  - Subprefect: Noel Miranda Castro

Area
  - Total: 360.6 km^{2} (139.2 sq mi)

Population (2005)
  - Total: 148,239
- Website: Subprefecture of Parelheiros (Portuguese)

The Subprefecture of Parelheiros is one of 32 subprefectures of the city of São Paulo, Brazil. It comprises two districts: Parelheiros and Marsilac.

It's the southernmost, least populated and poorest borough of São Paulo. Most of its area is rural, covered by parts of the Atlantic Rainforest.

== Public Equipment ==
- 50th Metropolitan Military Police Battalion

== See also ==
- Line 9 of Train (CPTM)
- Roman Catholic Diocese of Santo Amaro
- Parelheiros-Itanhaém Highway 57
- Guarapiranga Reservoir
- Colônia crater
