= Grajaú, São Paulo =

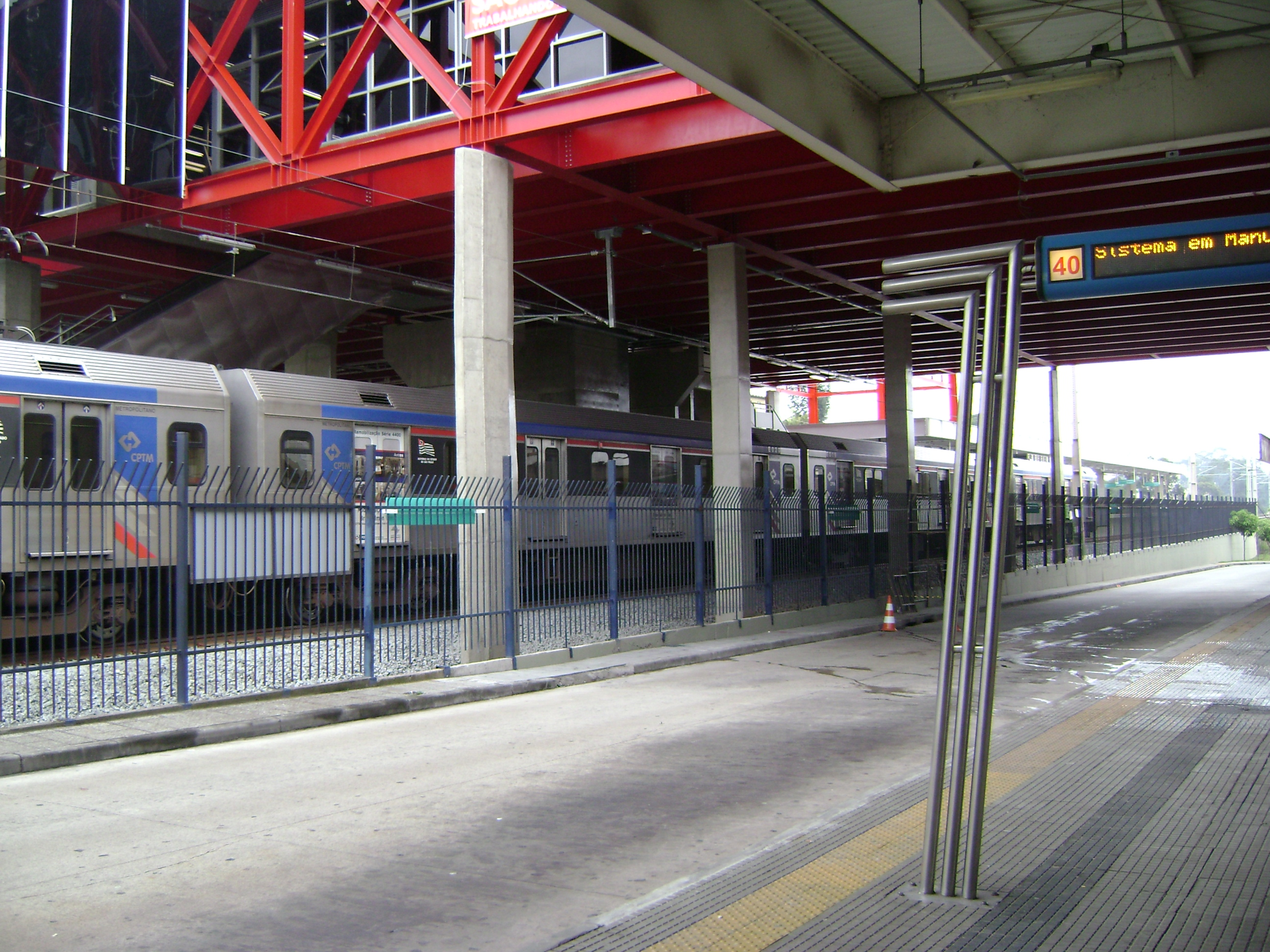
Grajaú station

Grajaú is the main neighborhood of the district of Grajaú, located in the South Zone of the city of São Paulo, Brazil. It is located near Jardim Eliana and Jardim Lucélia. It has shops, bakeries and supermarkets.

== Toponymy ==
The toponym "Grajaú" derivers from the Tupi term karaîá'y, meaning "river of Karajá" (karaîá, carajá + 'y, rio).

== See also ==
- Subprefecture of Capela do Socorro
- Grajaú (CPTM) Train Station
- Line 9 (CPTM)
- Roman Catholic Diocese of Santo Amaro
