= Grajaú (district of São Paulo) =

District of São Paulo, Brazil

Coordinates: 23.7738°S 46.6693°W

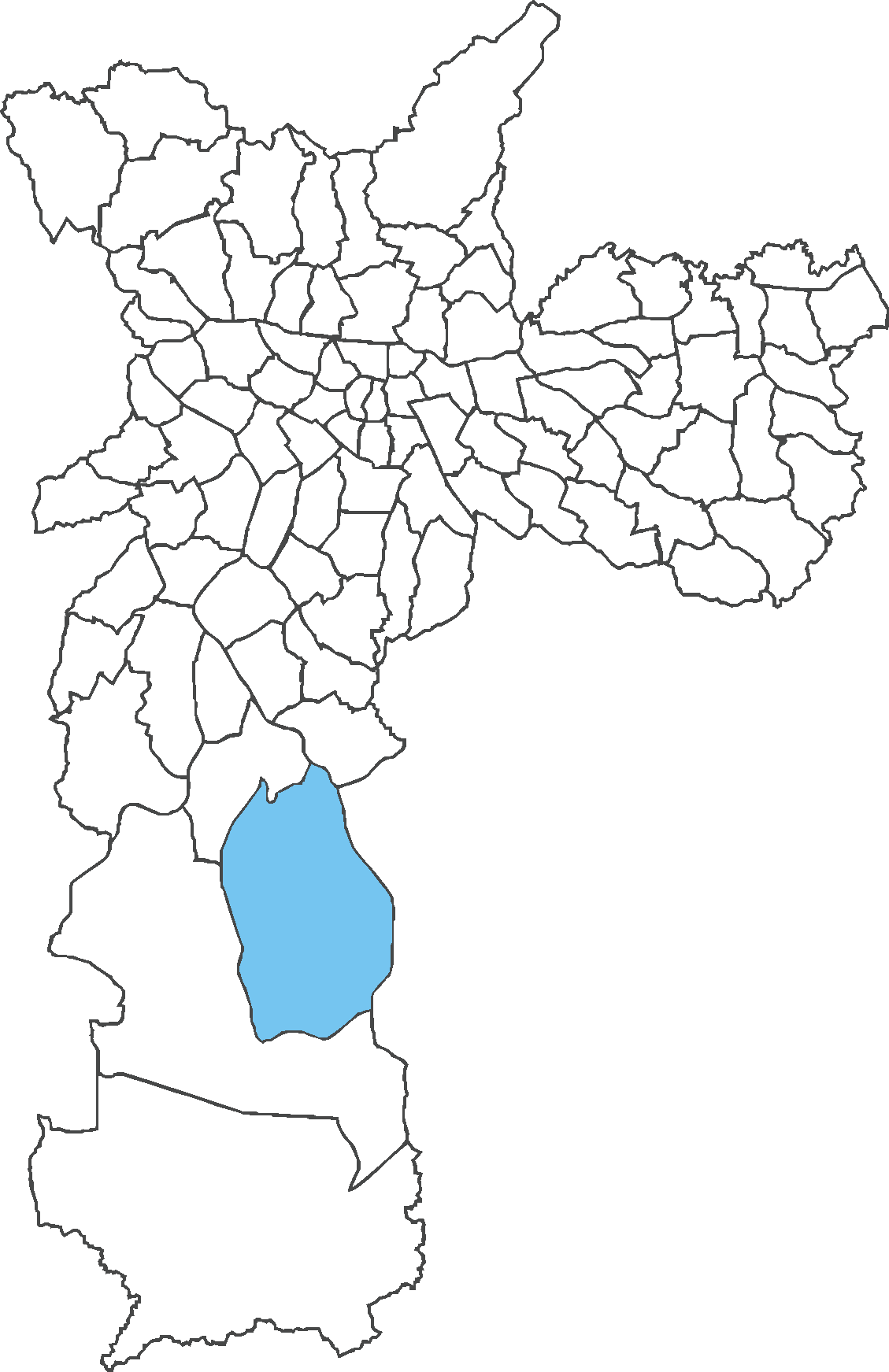
- District of the city of São Paulo
- Country: Brazil
- State: São Paulo
- Municipality: São Paulo
- Subprefecture: Capela do Socorro

Area
  - Total: 92.00 km^{2} (35.52 sq mi)

Population (2007)
  - Total: 360,787
  - Density: 3,922/km^{2} (10,160/sq mi)
- Website: Subprefecture of Capela do Socorro

Grajaú is one of 96 districts in the city of São Paulo, Brazil.

Grajaú is a district of the municipality of São Paulo, located in the South Zone. It is administered by the subprefecture of Capela do Socorro, within the administrative region of the South Zone of São Paulo. Its limits are the districts of Pedreira, Cidade Dutra, Parelheiros and the municipalities of São Bernardo do Campo and Diadema. It is 26 km from Praça da Sé and 14 km from the main neighborhoods of the south zone of the city such as Santo Amaro and Jabaquara. Currently, it has a population of approximately 445 thousand inhabitants, being the most populous district of the capital.

== Neighborhoods of Grajaú ==
- Catinho do Céu
- Chácara Cocaia
- BNH
- Chácara do Sol
- Chácara Lagoinha
- Cidade Luz
- Cipó do Meio
- Colônia do Grajaú
- Corujas
- Gaivotas
- Grajaú
- Ilha do Bororé
- Jardim Almeida Prado
- Jardim Alvorada (Grajaú)
- Jardim Arco-íris
- Jardim Belcito
- Jardim Bonito
- Jardim Borba Gato
- Jardim Brasília
- Jardim Campinas
- Jardim Castro Alves
- Jardim das Pedras (Grajaú)
- Jardim dos Manacás
- Jardim Edda
- Jardim Edi
- Jardim Eliana
- Jardim Ellus
- Jardim Gaivotas
- Jardim Icaraí
- Jardim Itajaí
- Jardim Itatiáia
- Jardim Jaú
- Jardim Labitary
- Jardim Lucélia
- Jardim Marilda
- Jardim Marisa
- Jardim Mirna
- Jardim Monte Alegre
- Jardim Monte Verde
- Jardim Myrna
- Jardim Noronha
- Jardim Nossa Senhora Aparecida
- Jardim Nova Tereza
- Jardim Novo Horizonte
- Jardim Novo Jaú
- Jardim Novo Lar
- Jardim Orbam
- Jardim Planalto
- Jardim Porto Velho
- Jardim Prainha
- Jardim Recanto do Sol
- Jardim Reimberg
- Jardim Sabiá (Grajaú)
- Jardim Salinas
- Jardim Samara (Grajaú)
- Jardim Samas
- Jardim Santa Bárbara
- Jardim Santa Fé
- Jardim Santa Francisca
- Jardim Santa Francisca Cabrini
- Jardim Santa Tereza
- Jardim São Bernardo
- Jardim São Pedro (Grajaú)
- Jardim São Remo
- Jardim Sete de Setembro
- Jardim Shangri-lá
- Jardim Sipramar
- Jardim Tanay
- Jardim Três Corações
- Jardim Varginha
- Jardim Orion
- Jardim Zilda
- Lago Azul
- Parada 57
- Parque América (Grajaú)
- Parque Brasil
- Parque Cocaia
- Parque Deizy
- Parque Grajaú
- Parque Manacá
- Parque Novo Grajaú
- Parque Planalto
- Parelheiros (Grajaú)
- Parque Santa Cecília
- Parque São José
- Parque São Miguel
- Parque São Paulo
- Parque Shangrilá
- Recanto Marisa
- Sítio Cocaia
- Toca do Tatu
- Vila Morais Prado
- Vila Narciso
- Vila Nascente
- Vila Natal

== See also ==
- Grajaú (CPTM) Train Station
- Mendes-Vila Natal (CPTM) Train Station
- Line 9 (CPTM)
- Roman Catholic Diocese of Santo Amaro
