= Parelheiros =

Parelheiros may refer to:

- Subprefecture of Parelheiros, São Paulo, one of 31 subprefectures of the city of São Paulo, Brazil
  - Parelheiros (district of São Paulo), one of 2 districts within the subprefecture
