= Parelheiros (district of São Paulo) =

District of São Paulo, Brazil

Coordinates: 23°51′S 46°44′W

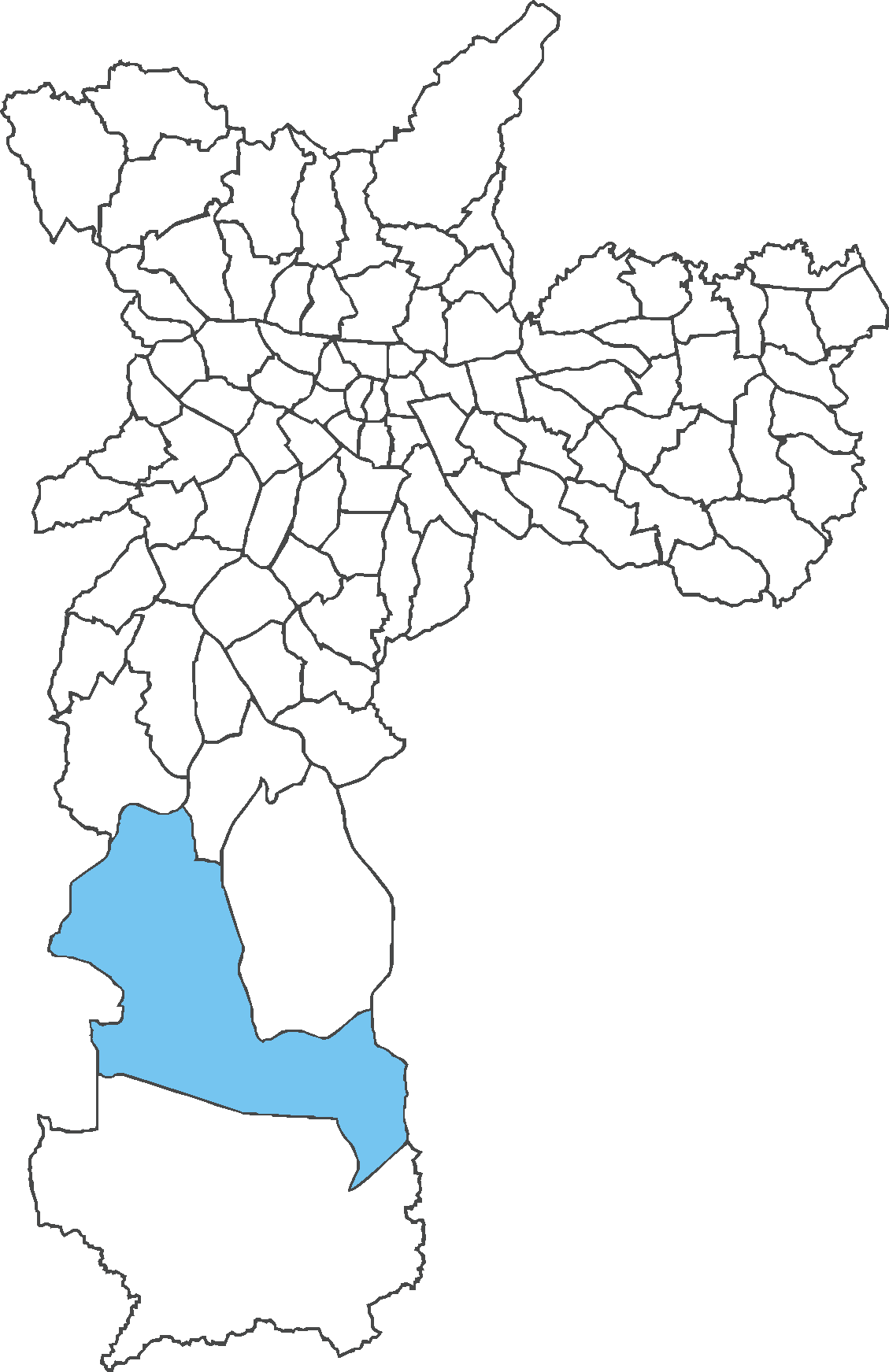
- Location of Parelheiros in São Paulo
- Country: Brazil
- State: São Paulo
- City: São Paulo

Government
  - Type: Subprefecture
  - Subprefect: Abílio José Mendes Gomes

Area
  - Total: 153 km^{2} (59 sq mi)

Population (2007)
  - Total: 146,212
- HDI: 0.747 – medium
- Website: Subprefecture of Parelheiros

Parelheiros is one of 96 districts of the city of São Paulo. Located in the subprefecture of Parelheiros in the extreme south of the city, it is one of the largest and most rural districts. Very little of this area is inhabited, and is covered with reserves of the Atlantic Forest. In Parelheiros there are also two indigenous villages of a Guaraní subgroup with about one thousand residents. The region also received many German immigrants in the beginning of 1800. The inhabitants of the place have the lowest purchasing power of the city. The district is poorly served by public transport and roads; there is little connection to the central districts of the city.

The Parelheiros district covers 153 km^{2}, the second largest in the city after neighboring Marsilac. The area consists largely of protected springs, wetlands, and Atlantic Forest. It includes parts of the drainage basins of the Guarapiranga and Billings Reservoirs, which supply approximately 30% of the population of Greater São Paulo with electricity.

The 4.4 km diameter Colônia crater is a geologic feature in the area, believed to have been created by a meteorite many millions of years ago. The area of the crater has been protected by the State Secretary of Culture since 2003.

Originally inhabited by Tupi Indians, in the 20th century a Guaraní subgroup established itself there and today there are two villages of the Guaranís—Aldeia Krukutu and Morro da Saudade. In January 2015, the city of São Paulo estimated that more than 40,000 people live in the Vargem Grande neighborhood, located inside the Colônia crater. Vargem Grande began with a land purchase in 1986 by a group representing 3000 people who lived in favelas in nearby neighborhood of Grajaú.

In spite of the restrictions imposed by the environmental legislation, the area faces problems associated with urbanization, including irregular housing, deforestation, real estate development, and water pollution.

== History ==
In the region of Parelheiros, there were already some caboclos before the arrival of the Germans (1829). The place received its current name because of the diverse horse-riding races (parelhas, in Portuguese) between the Germans and the Brazilians. Before it was known as Santa Cruz (Saint Cross), due to the installation of a cross, done by a devotee called Amaro de Pontes.

Parelheiros stands out in relation to the Paulista Colony because a road opened in the 19th century, by Henrique Schunck (German), father of the founder of Cipó (nowadays district of Embu-Guaçu). The street of Parelheiros, nowadays Avenida Sadamu Inoue, connected the villages Embu-Guaçu and São José, where you could leave for the districts Rio Bonito and Santo Amaro, preventing, like this, the passage by the Colony, where there was the oldest road of Conceição.

In the middle of the 20th century, principally after World War II, diverse Japanese people disembarked in Port of Santos. Most of them stayed in the so-called Cinturão Verde Metropolitano de São Paulo (Green Metropolitan Belt of São Paulo).

The neighborhoods of Jaceguava and Casa Grande – that are part of the Subprefecture of Parelheiros – were being occupied by Japanese families, where they would dedicate to agricultural labor.

Searching for a cheap accommodation, a very numerous population chose the springs of Santo Amaro to reside. With the possibility of finding lower renting costs or even owning a house, many lots surged, but not without sacrifice. Many of the lots were irregular, due to the publication of the Protection to the Springs law in 1976.

The lack of large spaces in urban areas led to getting into the lands of the caipiras of Santo Amaro, of a soil exhausted by rudimentary houses. Letting their territories was the best way to get away from the problems, for the increase of taxes territories began making the big properties more expensive. The solution was to divide the country houses and farms into lots, giving place to the emergence of towns, gardens, and parks leaving that the interests of the real estate speculation determined the location of home of the hard-working population, increasing, in the delimitation of the urban plan, the disorder in the use of the soil.

== Demographic profile ==
Research by the Fundação Sistema Estadual de Análise de Dados (State Data Analysis System Foundation) indicated that the young population of this subprefecture is the largest in São Paulo. In 2004, the risk of a man between the ages of 15 and 24 dying was 21 times higher in Parelheiros than in Pinheiros. It is classified by CRECI as "Value E Zone", as are other districts of the capital: Campo Limpo, Brasilândia and Itaim Paulista.

Demographic evolution of the Parelheiros district

== Neighborhoods of Parelheiros ==
- Barragem
- Bosque do Sol
- Casa Grande
- Chácara Ana
- Chácara Lago Grande
- Chácara Santo Hubertos
- Chácara São Sebastião
- Chácara São Silvestre
- Chácara Schunck
- Cidade Luz
- Cidade Satélite
- Colônia
- Curucutu
- Embura
- Itaim de Parelheiros
- Jaceguava
- Jardim Aladim
- Jardim dos Álamos
- Jardim Almeida
- Jardim Alviverde
- Jardim Campo Belo
- Jardim das Fontes
- Jardim das Laranjeiras
- Jardim do Bosque
- Jardim do Centro
- Jardim Herplin
- Jardim Iporã
- Jardim Itaim
- Jardim Juçara
- Jardim Maria Amália
- Jardim Maria Borba
- Jardim Novo Parelheiros
- Jardim Palmeiras
- Jardim Paulo Afonso
- Jardim Ramala
- Jardim Santa Cruz
- Jardim Santa Teresinha
- Jardim Santa Fé
- Jardim São Joaquim
- Jardim Silveira
- Jardim Vera Cruz
- Parque Sumaré
- Praia Paulistana
- Rancho Alegre
- Recanto Campo Belo
- Recanto do Papai
- Sítio Casa Grande
- Sítio Santa Cecília
- Sítio Vale Verde
- Sumaré
- Vila Bororé
- Vila Esperança
- Vila Isabel
- Vila Nova Esperança
- Vila Roschel

== See also ==
- Roman Catholic Diocese of Santo Amaro
- Line 9 (CPTM) of Train
- Railway Line Santos-Jundiaí
- Colônia crater
- Guarapiranga reservoir
- Parelheiros-Itanhaém Highway 57
