= Murders of Liana Friedenbach and Felipe Caffé =

2003 murder of two students in Brazil

- Location: Embu-Guaçu, São Paulo, Brazil
- Date: 1 to 5 November 2003
- Attack type: torture and murder
- Deaths: 2
- Victims: Liana Friedenbach; Felipe Caffe
- Accused: Paulo César da Silva Marques ("Pernambuco"); Roberto Aparecido Alves Cardoso ("Champinha"); Antônio Caetano; Antônio Matias; Agnaldo Pires

The murders of Liana Friedenbach and Felipe Caffé took place in the rural area of Embu-Guaçu, Greater São Paulo, between November 1 and 5, 2003. A group of four men and a teenager kidnapped and murdered the 19-year-old Felipe Silva Caffé and the 16-year-old Liana Bei Friedenbach. Liana Bei Friedenbach was born in São Paulo, on May 6, 1987, and was murdered in Juquitiba, on November 5, 2003. Felipe Silva Caffé was born on July 1, 1984, and was murdered in November 2003. Liana was the daughter of lawyer Ari Friedenbach. The events caused deep indignation in Brazilian society and rekindled the debate regarding the age of criminal responsibility in the country.

The killers were arrested a few days after the crimes. In July 2006, Antonio Caetano da Silva, Agnaldo Pires and Antônio Mathias de Barros were sentenced by the Justice to 124, 47 and 6 years in prison, respectively. In November 2007, Paulo César da Silva Marques, known as "Pernambuco", was sentenced to 110 years and 18 days in prison for the murder. Roberto Aparecido Alves Cardoso, known as "Champinha" and considered the leader of the gang, was underage at the time of the couple's death and was interned at the Experimental Health Unit of the Tietê Unit of the CASA Foundation (formerly Febem), in Vila Maria, Zona Norte of São Paulo, where he has remained since then. After turning 18, he was evaluated again and transferred to the Casa de Custódia de Taubaté, for an indefinite period, due to his high degree of danger to society.

== The crime ==
Students Liana Friedenbach, 16 years old, and Felipe Silva Caffé, 19, were kidnapped while they were camping in an abandoned farm in the municipality of Embu-Guaçu, in Greater São Paulo. The couple lied about the trip to their parents. Liana had said that she would go to Ilhabela with a group of young people from the Jewish community. Felipe's family said they knew the boy was going camping, but believed he was with friends.

The couple would have spent the early hours of October 31, 2003, under the free span of MASP, on Avenida Paulista, in São Paulo, where they would have stayed until 5 am on the 1st, when they arrived at the Tietê Bus Terminal. Liana and Felipe disembarked in Embu-Guaçu at around 9 am and took another bus to Santa Rita, a village close to the abandoned site. The students walked the 4.5 km (2.8 mi) to the place where they camped, under a crumbling roof.

Champinha and Pernambuco were going to fish in the region when they saw the couple in the morning and then had the idea of robbing the students. The couple was approached in the afternoon. However, when they realized that the young people had no money, the criminals opted to kidnap them instead. The students were first taken to a site in the region for holding, before taking them to the home of a friend, also empty.

Liana said she belonged to a wealthy family and proposed asking for a ransom in exchange for her release. At night, Pernambuco raped Liana, while Felipe stayed in another room. On the second day, the students were required to walk along a trail. While Felipe continued with Pernambuco, Champinha stayed with Liana in the woods. Felipe was murdered near a ravine, shot in the back of the head. Liana, according to Champinha, did not see her boyfriend killed, although she heard the shot. She asked for her boyfriend, but Pernambuco said he had been released and fled after the crime.

Liana remained with Champinha, but no ransom demand was made to the family. On the third day, her father found out that she had traveled with her boyfriend and, under suspicion that the young people had gotten lost in the woods, called the Special Operations Command.(COE), which initiated a search. The camp site was discovered and, in addition to the tent, the students' clothes, Liana's wallet and cell phone were located. Antônio Caitano Silva, owner of the house where Champinha stayed with Liana, arrived with a friend, Agnaldo Pires. Champinha presented Liana as his girlfriend and offered the girl to his friends, and she was raped by Agnaldo Pires. Silva, Pires, Champinha and Liana went to the house of Antonio Matias de Barros (owner of the first house where she was kept) and they went fishing.

Late in the afternoon, a brother of Champinha went to Barros' house to look for his brother, since his mother was worried about his disappearance. Liana was once again presented as Champinha's girlfriend. As the police approached, Champinha decided to kill Liana, despite having told his friends that he would take the girl to the bus station. Liana was stabbed to death on November 5 in a densely forested area during the early hours of the morning. The bodies were found on November 10.

== Arrest and conviction of those responsible ==
Champinha and his accomplices were arrested days after the crimes. In July 2006, Antonio Caetano da Silva, Agnaldo Pires and Antônio Mathias de Barros were sentenced, respectively, to 124, 47 and 6 years in prison. In November 2007, Paulo César da Silva Marques, known as "Pernambuco", was sentenced to 110 years and 18 days in prison for the murder. He had been in prison since the time of the crime and was the last of the five involved to be tried.

=== Champinha ===
Considered the leader of the gang, Roberto Aparecido Alves Cardoso, known as "Champinha", was 16 years old at the time of the couple's murder and was interned in Unit 1 of the CASA Foundation (formerly Febem), in the Vila Maria Complex, in the North Zone of São Paulo. Paul. According to the Child and Adolescent Statute (ECA), he could have been interned for up to three years or at most until he turned 21 (article 121, paragraph 5). When he turned 21, however, the Public Ministry requested his civil interdiction based on Law 10.216/2001. A psychiatric report indicated that he has serious mental illnesses, such as antisocial personality disorder and mild intellectual disability, which may present risks to society.

Champinha was transferred to an Experimental Health Unit (UES), intended for the recovery of young offenders with mental disorders, where he remains to this day. Since then, his custody has become the responsibility of the São Paulo government. Champinha has already had requests for freedom denied by the Federal Supreme Court (STF), by the Superior Court of Justice (STJ) and by the Court of Justice of the State of São Paulo (TJ-SP).

On May 2, 2007, he ran away from Fundação Casa. The escape took place around 6 pm, when he escaped with at least one accomplice. Both climbed the seven meter high wall using a ladder. Recaptured 11 hours later, he was again admitted.

On December 17, 2007, a TV station filmed Champinha in a comfortable house, decorated to a high standard, with a sofa, 29-inch TV and five daily meals prepared by nutritionists. The video generated outrage and criticism of the government. The then-governor José Serra defended his situation, saying that he would be better off there than on the streets committing crimes. The Secretary of Justice of São Paulo also repudiated the press, saying that they wanted to morally lynch the State. Champinha would cost the State around 12,000 reais a month.
