= Grajaú (disambiguation) =

Grajaú is a municipality in the Brazilian state of Maranhão.

Grajaú may also refer to:

- Grajaú, Rio de Janeiro, a neighborhood
- Grajaú, São Paulo, a neighborhood
- Grajaú (district of São Paulo)
