= Autódromo (CPTM) =

Railway station in São Paulo, Brazil

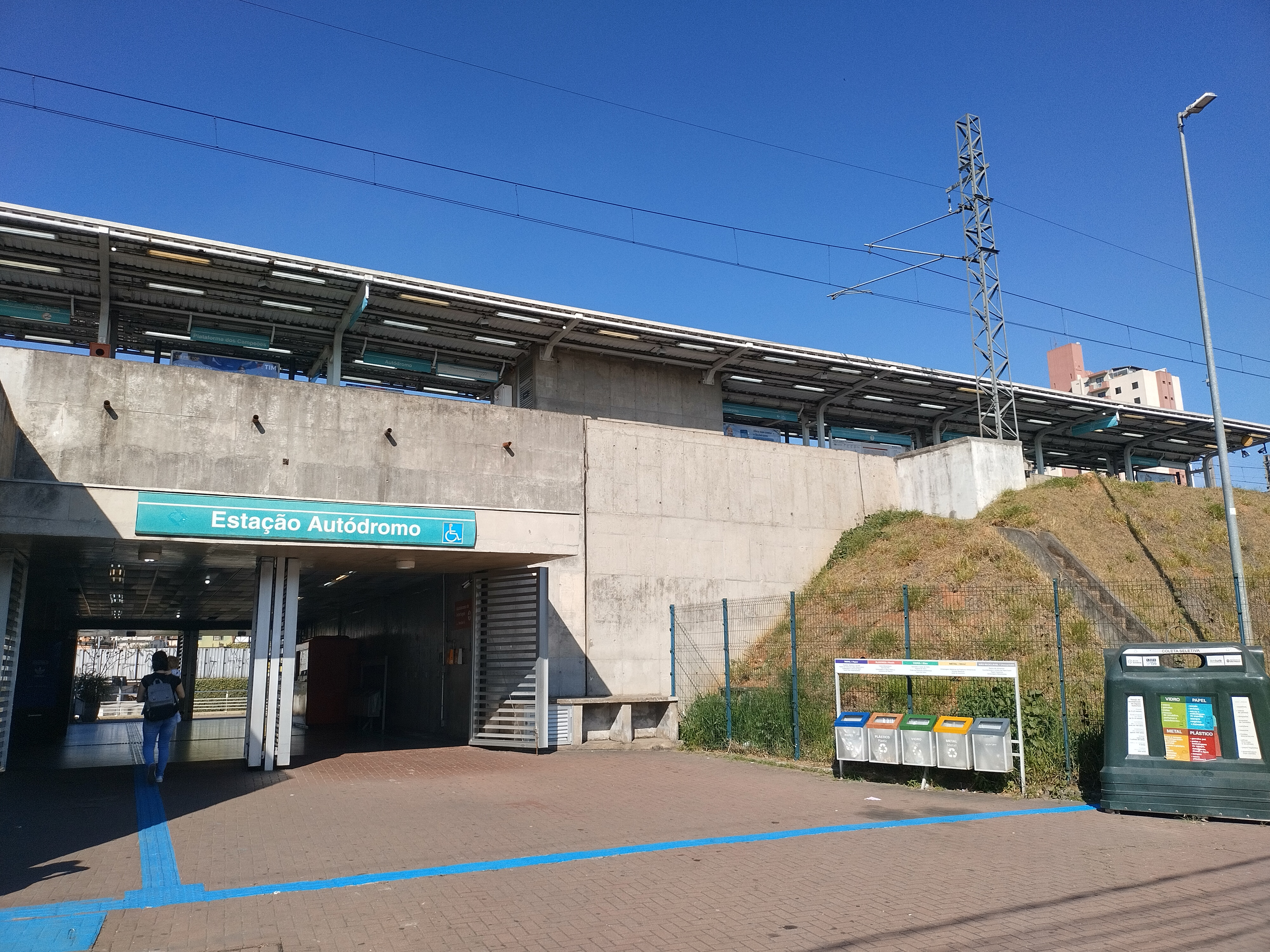
- Entrance to the station in 2022

General information
- Location: R. Plínio Schmidt, 307; Cidade Dutra; Brazil
- Coordinates: 23.7061667°S 46.6883647°W
- Owner: Government of the State of São Paulo
- Operator: ViaMobilidade Linhas 8 e 9 (Motiva)
- Platforms: Island platform

Construction
- Structure type: Elevated
- Architect: Luiz Carlos Esteves

Other information
- Station code: AUT

History
- Opened: 17 October 2007; 18 years ago

Services
Preceding station	São Paulo Metropolitan Trains	Following station
Jurubatuba towards Osasco	Line 9	Primavera-Interlagos towards Varginha
Track layout
Location

Autódromo is a train station on ViaMobilidade Linhas 8 e 9 Line 9-Emerald, in the district of Cidade Dutra in São Paulo, 600 metres (2,000 ft) away from Autódromo José Carlos Pace.

== History ==
The station was built by CPTM to attend Interlagos Circuit and adjacencies. Opened on 17 October 2007, the station was the first of integrated operation between CPTM and Metro. It is also the first to be delivered to transform CPTM lined in surface metro, which consists in less wait time in the platform and more comfort in the trains, among other aspects.

Autódromo station is also close to the entrance of Pinheiros River Bicycle Path, accessed through Vitorino Goulart da Silva Bridge.

== See also ==
- Cidade Dutra
- Line 9 (CPTM)
- Subprefecture of Capela do Socorro
- Roman Catholic Diocese of Santo Amaro
- Interlagos Racetrack
