= Primavera-Interlagos (CPTM) =

Railway station in São Paulo, Brazil

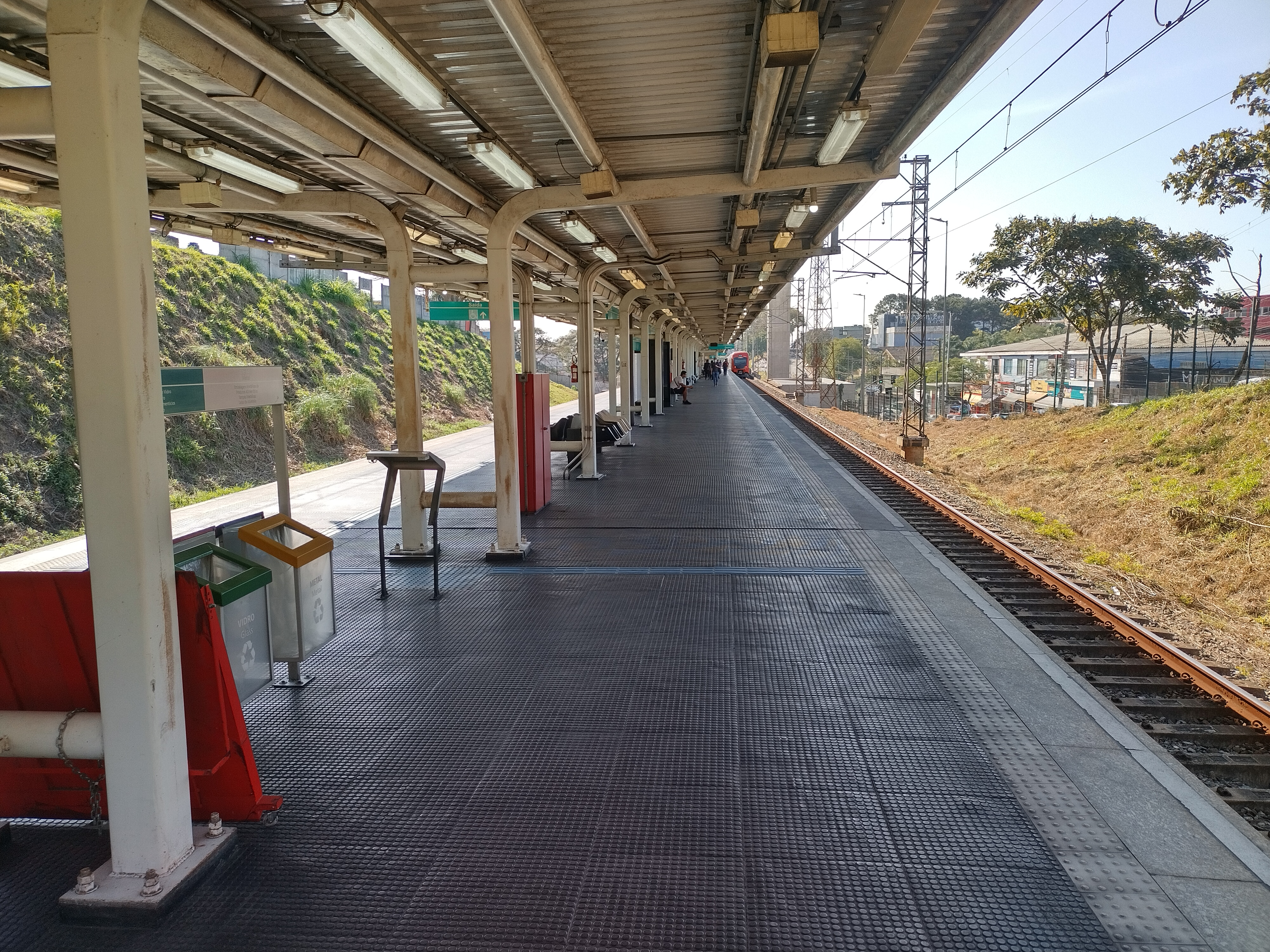
- Platform of the station in 2022

General information
- Location: R. Jequirituba, 83, Cidade Dutra; São Paulo; Brazil
- Coordinates: 23.723465°S 46.691734°W
- Owner: Government of the State of São Paulo
- Operator: ViaMobilidade Linhas 8 e 9 (Motiva)
- Platforms: Island platform

Construction
- Structure type: At-grade
- Architect: Luiz Carlos Esteves

Other information
- Station code: INT

History
- Opened: 21 April 2008; 18 years ago
- Former names: Interlagos

Services
Preceding station	São Paulo Metropolitan Trains	Following station
Autódromo towards Osasco	Line 9	Grajaú towards Varginha
Track layout
Location

Primavera-Interlagos is a train station on ViaMobilidade Linhas 8 e 9 Line 9-Emerald, in the district of Cidade Dutra in São Paulo. The station was built by CPTM to attend the regions of Jardim Primavera and Interlagos.

== See also ==
- Cidade Dutra
- Line 9 (CPTM)
- Subprefecture of Capela do Socorro
- Roman Catholic Diocese of Santo Amaro
- Interlagos Racetrack
