= Bruno Covas/Mendes-Vila Natal (CPTM) =

Railway station in São Paulo, Brazil

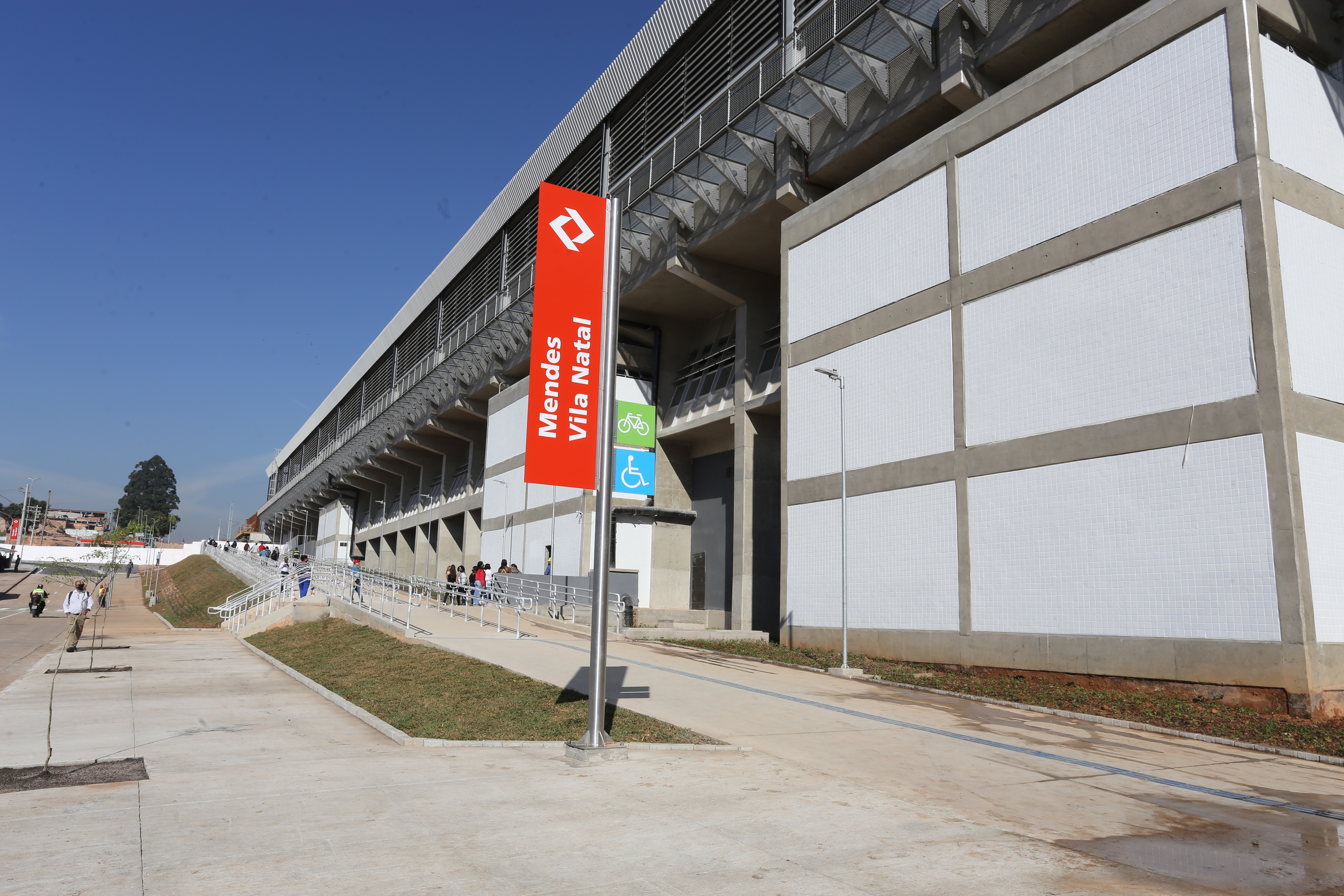
- The station on its opening day

General information
- Location: Estrada dos Mendes, s/n Grajaú; Brazil
- Coordinates: 23.755808°S 46.710021°W
- Owner: Government of the State of São Paulo
- Operator: ViaMobilidade Linhas 8 e 9 (Motiva)
- Platforms: Island platform

Construction
- Structure type: Elevated

Other information
- Station code: MVN

History
- Opened: 10 August 2021; 5 years ago
- Former names: Mendes; Mendes-Vila Natal

Services
Preceding station	São Paulo Metropolitan Trains	Following station
Grajaú towards Osasco	Line 9	Varginha Terminus
Track layout
Location

Bruno Covas/Mendes-Vila Natal, formerly Mendes-Vila Natal, or simply just Mendes or Vila Natal, is a train station on ViaMobilidade Linhas 8 e 9 Line 9-Emerald. It is part of the State Government plan to extend the line in 4.5 kilometres (2.8 mi) until the place where was located the old Varginha station of the Jurubatuba branch, of the extinct FEPASA. The branch was deactivated by CPTM in the end of 2001 "due to infrastructure precariousness" of the line at the time. After the station opening, governor João Doria signed a state decree renaming the station after the late São Paulo mayor Bruno Covas, who died from cancer in May 2021.

== Demand ==
The station is needed due to the fact of it attending the linear demand for being located next to a residential neighbourhood and having many public equipments, stores, and commercial ventures in its surroundings, like Parque Residencial Palmares Housing, Flávia Residential Condominium, Parque das Madres Catholic Church, besides many public elementary, middle and high schools, like E. M. E. I. (Municipal Elementary School) Aurelio Buarque de Holanda, and E. E. (State School) Afrânio de Oliveira.

Besides that, the station is close to the Avenida Senador Teotônio Vilela public transportation corridor, an important connection axis between the districts of Parelheiros and Grajaú, in South Side São Paulo.

== History ==
Originally, two consortiums were signed in the line expansion bidding with an estimated time of 18 months for the service execution, in an estimated cost of R$ 350,000,000 (US$ 209,226,436.9 in 2011). But due to complication in the construction financing, it began only in 2013, but were put on hold in the end of 2016, due to the bidding being signed only with state financing, as the construction needed to receive federal financing, forcing the State Government to terminate the contract with the consortiums.

On 17 April 2018, governor Márcio França authorized the resume of the construction of the Line 9 extension towards Varginha, including four road bridges above the railway to allow the readjustment of the roads of the region, besides the trains electric system, adding up a total investment of R$ 25,000,000 (US$ 6,842,191.69) that were released from the Ministry of Cities. Due to delays, the predicted cost for the constructions is estimated in R$ 87,000,000 (US$ 23,810,827.08), in a 30 months contract - being 18 for construction and 12 for assisted operation. The deliver was scheduled for the second half of 2021.

== Characteristics ==
Elevated station with island platform in the upper level, while the main access, mezzanine, and ticket offices are in the lower level. It has accessibility items such as elevators, escalators, podotactile floor, and handrail with braille communication. Besides that, a bike attaching post is built in the station.

== See also ==
- Grajaú (district of São Paulo)
- Line 9 (CPTM)
- Subprefecture of Capela do Socorro
- Roman Catholic Diocese of Santo Amaro
