= Subprefecture of Capela do Socorro =

Subprefecture of the city of São Paulo, Brazil

Coordinates: 23°35′16″S 46°43′00″W

- Subprefecture
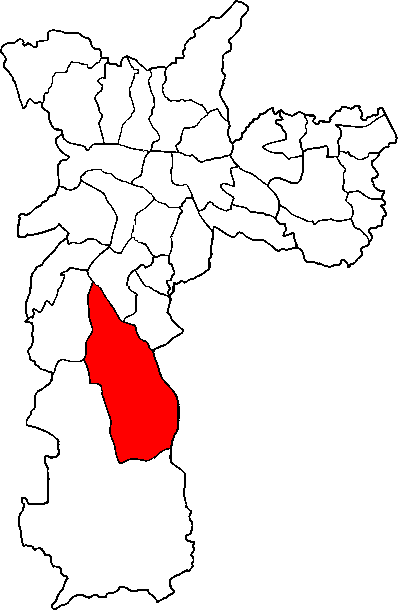
- Location of the Subprefecture of Capela do Socorro in São Paulo

- Location of municipality of São Paulo within the State of São Paulo
- Country: Brazil
- Region: Southeast
- State: São Paulo
- Municipality: São Paulo
- Administrative Zone: South
- Districts: Socorro, Grajaú, Cidade Dutra

Government
  - Type: Subprefecture
  - Subprefect: Marco Antônio Augusto

Area
  - Total: 132.23 km^{2} (51.05 sq mi)

Population (2005)
  - Total: 672,901
- Website: Subprefeitura Capela do Socorro (Portuguese)

The Subprefecture of Capela do Socorro is one of 32 subprefectures of the city of São Paulo, Brazil. It comprises three districts: Socorro, Grajaú, and Cidade Dutra.

This is the most populous subprefecture of São Paulo, with a total population of 672,901 inhabitants according to the census of 2010. It hosts the Interlagos Circuit, which receives yearly the Formula One Brazilian Grand Prix and also the only beach inside the municipality of São Paulo, in the margins of the Guarapiranga Dam.

== Public Equipment ==
- 99th Military Service Board Capela do Socorro
- 27th Metropolitan Military Police Battalion

== See also ==
- Roman Catholic Diocese of Santo Amaro
- Line 9 (CPTM) Paulista Metropolitan Trains Company
- Socorro (CPTM) Train station
- Autódromo (CPTM) Train station
- Primavera-Interlagos (CPTM) Train station
- Grajaú (CPTM) Train station
- Mendes-Vila Natal (CPTM) Train station
- Interlagos Racetrack
