= Cidade Dutra =

District of São Paulo, Brazil

- District of São Paulo
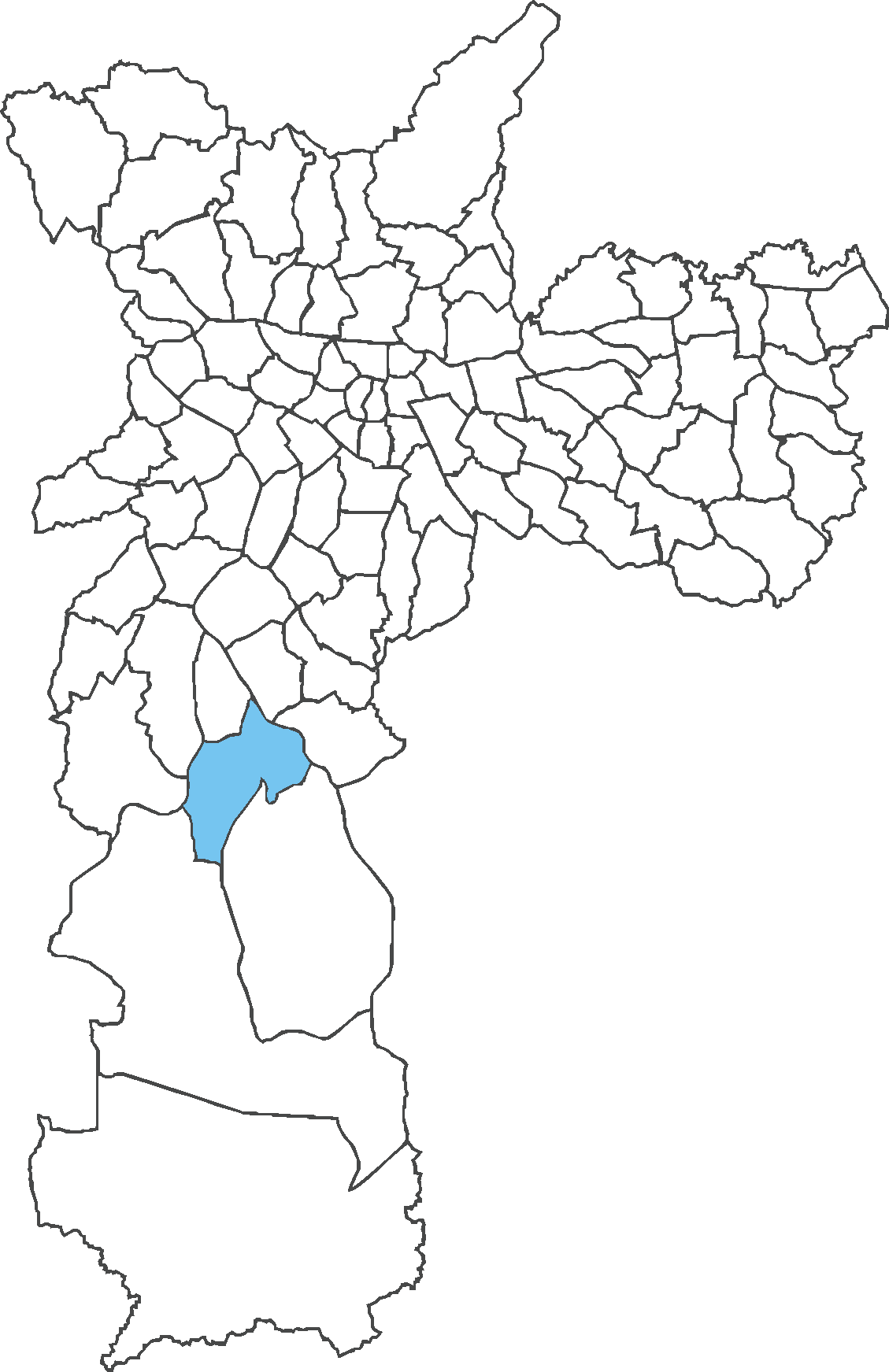
- District of the city of São Paulo
- Coordinates: 23°42′43″S 46°42′12″W
- Country: Brazil
- State: São Paulo
- Municipality: São Paulo
- Subprefecture: Capela do Socorro (Note: Subprefecture of Capela do Socorro, Address: Cassiano dos Santos Street, number 499 - Jardim Clipper Neighborhood - Postal code: 04827-110 - São Paulo - SP - Brazil)

Area
  - Total: 29.30 km^{2} (11.31 sq mi)

Population (2007)
  - Total: 196,360
  - Density: 6,702/km^{2} (17,360/sq mi)
- Website: capeladosocorro.prefeitura.sp.gov.br

Cidade Dutra is one of 96 districts in the city of São Paulo, Brazil.

== Neighborhoods of Cidade Dutra ==
- Chácara Meyer
- Chácara Monte Sol
- Cidade Dutra
- Conjunto Residencial Salvador Tolezani
- Granja Nossa Senhora Aparecida
- Jardim Alpino
- Jardim Amélia
- Jardim Ana Lúcia
- Jardim Angelina
- Jardim Beatriz
- Jardim Bichinhos
- Jardim Bonito
- Jardim Clipper
- Jardim Colonial
- Jardim Cristal
- Jardim Cruzeiro
- Jardim das Camélias
- Jardim das Imbuias
- Jardim das Praias
- Jardim do Alto
- Jardim Edilene
- Jardim Edith
- Jardim Floresta
- Jardim Graúna
- Jardim Guanabara
- Jardim Guanhembu
- Jardim Ícara
- Jardim Império
- Jardim Iporanga (Note: Addresses of neighborhood Jardim Iporanga in São Paulo, SP: Antônio Pereira Taques Street Postal code: 04828-120, Bento da Costa Street Postal code: 04828-150, Brás da Rocha Street Postal code: 04828-090, Gaspar Gonçalves Ribeiro Street Postal code: 04828-140, Gregório de Torres Street Postal code: 04828-160, João Pedroso Street Postal code: 04828-080, Miguel Muriano Square Postal code: 04828-110, Nicolas Alfaro Street Postal code: 04828-190, Rodrigues Vilares Avenue Postal code: 04828-100, Sebastião Pimentel Street Postal code: 04828-170 and Vicente Luís dos Passos Street Postal code: 04828-180)
- Jardim Jordanópolis (Note: Addresses of neighborhood Jardim Jordanópolis in São Paulo, SP: Aguilar Street Postal code: 04830-040, Altino Martins da Vitória Street Postal code: 04830-280, Artur Felice Street Postal code: 04830-260, Cidade de Itu Square Postal code: 04830-350, Duque de Saldanha Street Postal code: 04830-390, Edgar Roque Pinto Street Postal code: 04830-380, Eliseu D'Ângelo Visconti Street Postal code: 04830-330, Gêmea Dantas Street Postal code: 04830-300, Jean Leblond Street Postal code: 04830-270, José Carlos Prado Júnior Street Postal code: 04830-320 and José Linhares Street Postal code: 04830-320)
- Jardim Kika
- Jardim Kioto
- Jardim Lallo
- Jardim Leblon
- Jardim Mália
- Jardim Marcel
- Jardim Maria Rita
- Jardim Maringa
- Jardim Nizia
- Jardim Orion
- Jardim Panorama
- Jardim Pouso Alegre
- Jardim Presidente (Note: Addresses of neighborhood Jardim Presidente in São Paulo, SP: Aguanaval Street Postal code: 04830-190, Álvares Correia Street Postal code: 04830-110, Contos Amazônicos Street Postal code: 04830-130, Divina Comédia Street Postal code: 04830-170, Fajão Street Postal code: 04830-120, Jangada Nova Street Postal code: 04830-200, Joaquim Torres-Garcia Street Postal code: 04830-150, Monte Arroio Street Postal code: 04830-210, Monte-Frio Street Postal code: 04830-140, Ribatejo Street Postal code: 04830-160 and Ribeira do Vouga Street Postal code: 04830-180)
- Jardim Primavera
- Jardim Progresso
- Jardim Quarto Centenário
- Jardim Real
- Jardim Rêgis
- Jardim Represa
- Jardim República
- Jardim Rio Bonito
- Jardim Rosalina
- Jardim Samambaia
- Jardim Santa Rita
- Jardim São Benedito
- Jardim São Rafael
- Jardim Satélite
- Jardim Toca
- Parque Alto do Rio Bonito
- Parque Atlântico
- Parque das Árvores
- Parque do Castelo
- Parque Esmeralda
- Parque Nações Unidas
- Parque Paulistinha
- Recanto dos Sonhos
- Rio Bonito
- Terceira Divisão de Interlagos
- Vila da Paz
- Vila Diana
- Vila Progresso (Note: Addresses of neighborhood Vila Progresso in São Paulo, SP: Agenor Vieira da Silva Street Postal code: 04830-240, Argel Street Postal code: 04830-060, Bernardino Dallecio Street Postal code: 04830-230, Castel Gandolfo Street Postal code: 04830-050, João Leme do Prado Street Postal code: 04830-080, João Viegas Cortês Street Postal code: 04830-100, Lampadosa Street CEP: 04830-220, Lourenço de Matos Street CEP: 04830-090, Pires de Medeiros Street CEP: 04830-070, Sebastião Teberatti Street Postal code: 04830-250 and Tsuneo Hata Street Postal code: 04830-235)
- Vila Quintana
- Vila Represa
- Vila Rubi
- Vila São José
- Vila Vera

== See also ==
- Primavera-Interlagos (CPTM) Train station
- Autódromo (CPTM) Train station
- Line 9 (CPTM)
- Interlagos Racetrack
- Roman Catholic Diocese of Santo Amaro
