= Subprefecture of M'Boi Mirim =

- Subprefecture
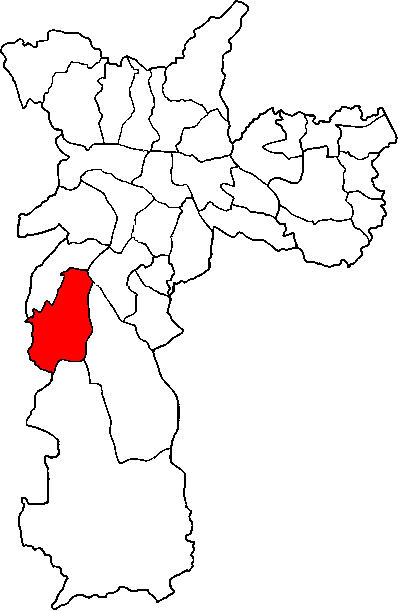
- Location of the Subprefecture of M'Boi Mirim in São Paulo

- Location of municipality of São Paulo within the State of São Paulo
- Coordinates: 23°41′10″S 46°46′14″W
- Country: Brazil
- Region: Southeast
- State: São Paulo
- Municipality: São Paulo
- Administrative Zone: South
- Districts: Jardim Ângela, Jardim São Luís

Government
  - Type: Subprefecture
  - Subprefect: Beto Mendes

Area
  - Total: 62.74 km^{2} (24.22 sq mi)

Population (2008)
  - Total: 544,446
- Website: Subprefeitura M'Boi Mirim (in Portuguese)

The Subprefecture of M'Boi Mirim is one of 32 subprefectures of the city of São Paulo, Brazil. It comprises two districts: Jardim Ângela and Jardim São Luís.

The area is serviced by Line 5 of the São Paulo Metro.
