= Jardim Ângela =

District of São Paulo, Brazil

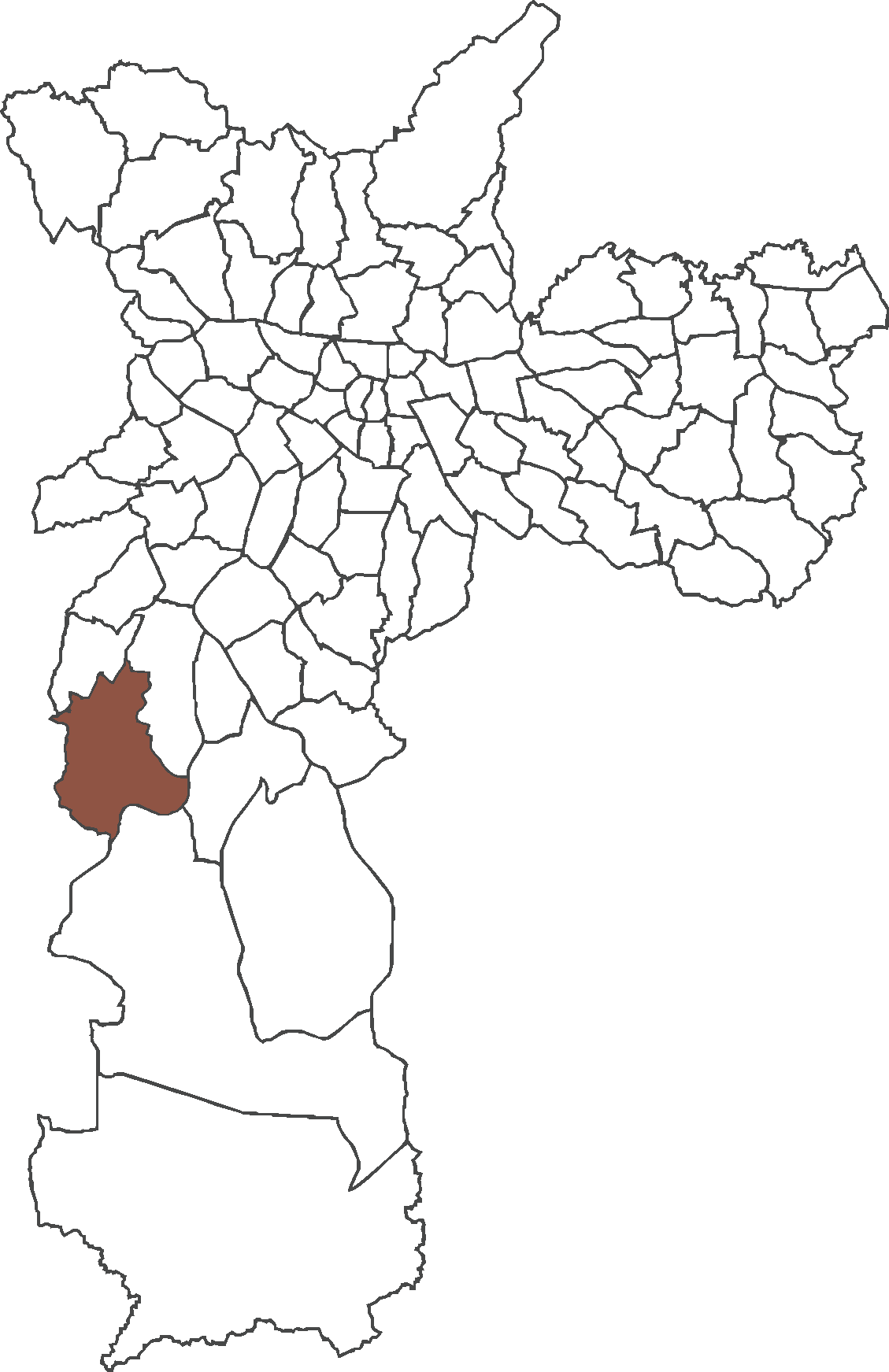
- Location of Jardim Ângela in São Paulo

- Location within São Paulo State
- Country: Brazil
- State: São Paulo
- City: São Paulo

Population (2005)
  - Total: 245,805
- HDI: 0.750 - medium
- Website: Subprefecture of Jardim Ângela

Jardim Ângela is a district in the subprefecture of M'Boi Mirim of the city of São Paulo, Brazil.
