= Jardim São Luís =

District of São Paulo, Brazil

Coordinates: 23.6506°S 46.7331°W

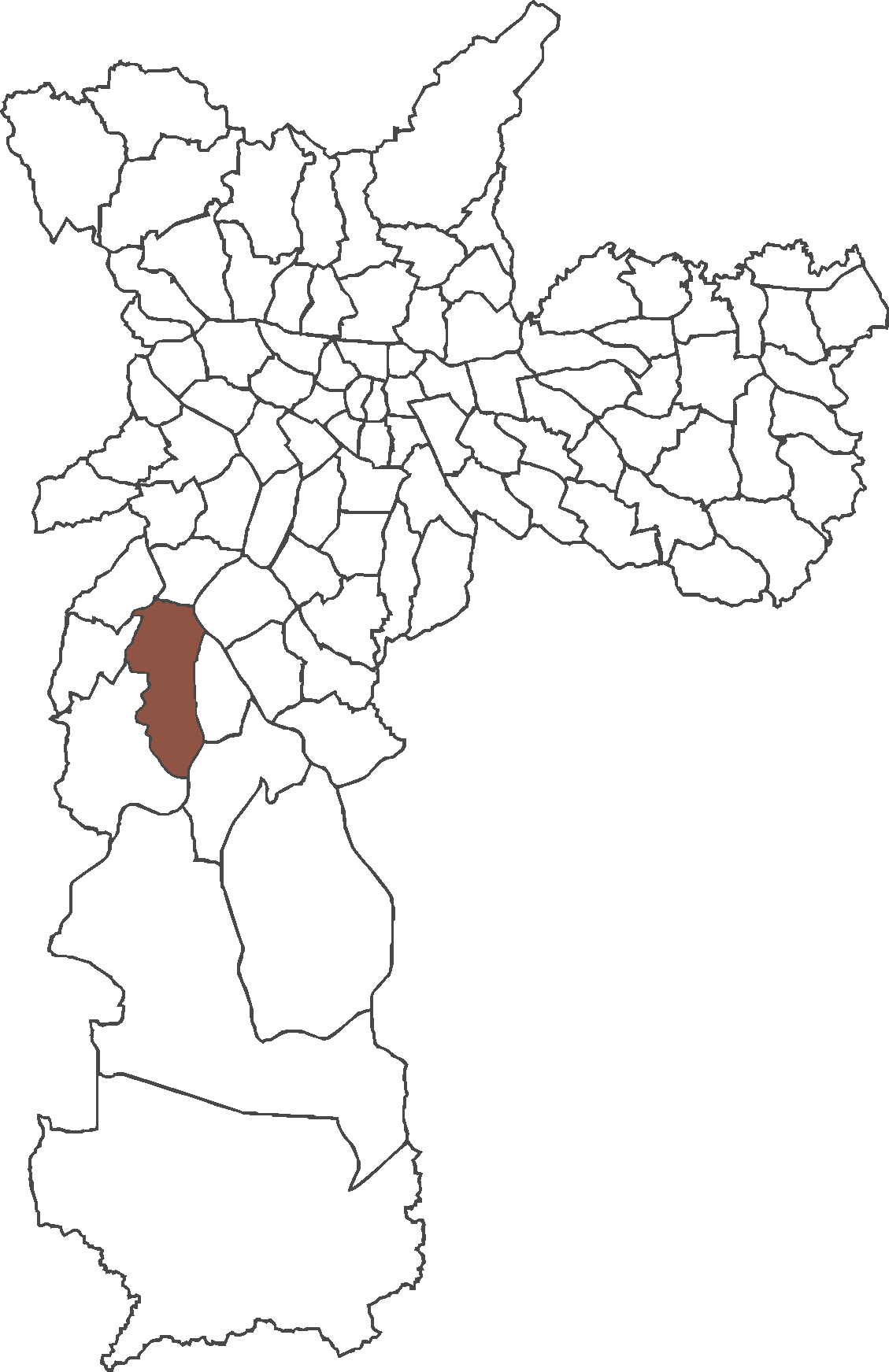
- District of the city of São Paulo
- Country: Brazil
- State: São Paulo
- Municipality: São Paulo
- Subprefecture: M’Boi Mirim

Area
  - Total: 24.70 km^{2} (9.54 sq mi)

Population (2007)
  - Total: 267,871
  - Density: 10,845/km^{2} (28,090/sq mi)
- Website: Subprefecture of M’Boi Mirim

Jardim São Luís is one of 96 districts in the city of São Paulo, Brazil.
