= São Lourenço da Serra =

- Municipality
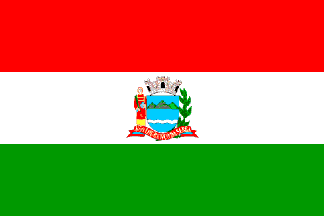
- Flag Coat of arms

- Location in São Paulo state

- Location in Brazil
- Coordinates: 23°51′10″S 46°56′34″W
- Country: Brazil
- Region: Southeast
- State: São Paulo
- Metrop. region: São Paulo

Area
  - Total: 186.46 km^{2} (71.99 sq mi)

Population (2020)
  - Total: 15,978
  - Density: 85.691/km^{2} (221.94/sq mi)
- Time zone: UTC−3 (BRT)
- Postal code: 06890
- Area code: +55-11

São Lourenço da Serra (Portuguese for "Saint Lawrence of the mountain") is a suburban municipality in the southeastern part of the state of São Paulo in Brazil. It is part of the Metropolitan Region of São Paulo. The population is 15,978 (2020 est.) in an area of 186.46 km^{2}. The southern part of the municipality is heavily forested with the Serra do Mar mountain range, the central and the northern parts are predominantly hilly and partially urbanized.

The neighborhood of Itapecerica da Serra became a separate municipality in 1991.

== Population history ==
Historical population
| Year | Pop. | ±% |
|---|---|---|
| 2003 | 13,645 | — |
| 2004 | 14,608 | +7.1% |
| 2015 | 15,177 | +3.9% |

== Media ==
In telecommunications, the city was served by Companhia de Telecomunicações do Estado de São Paulo until 1973, when it began to be served by Telecomunicações de São Paulo. In July 1998, this company was acquired by Telefónica, which adopted the Vivo brand in 2012.

The company is currently an operator of cell phones, fixed lines, internet (fiber optics/4G) and television (satellite and cable).

== See also ==
- List of municipalities in São Paulo
