= Itanhaém =

- Municipality
- Municipality of Itanhaém
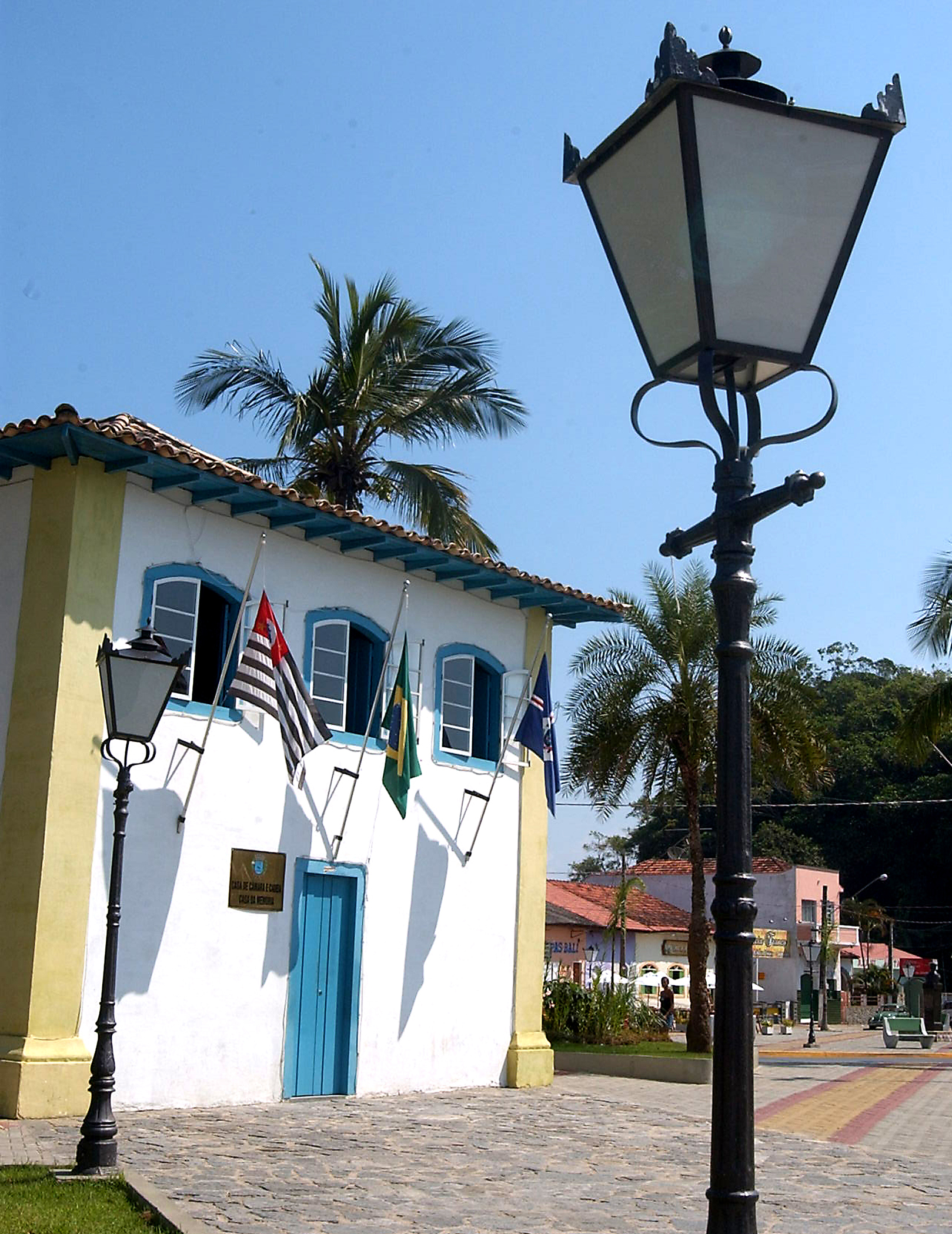
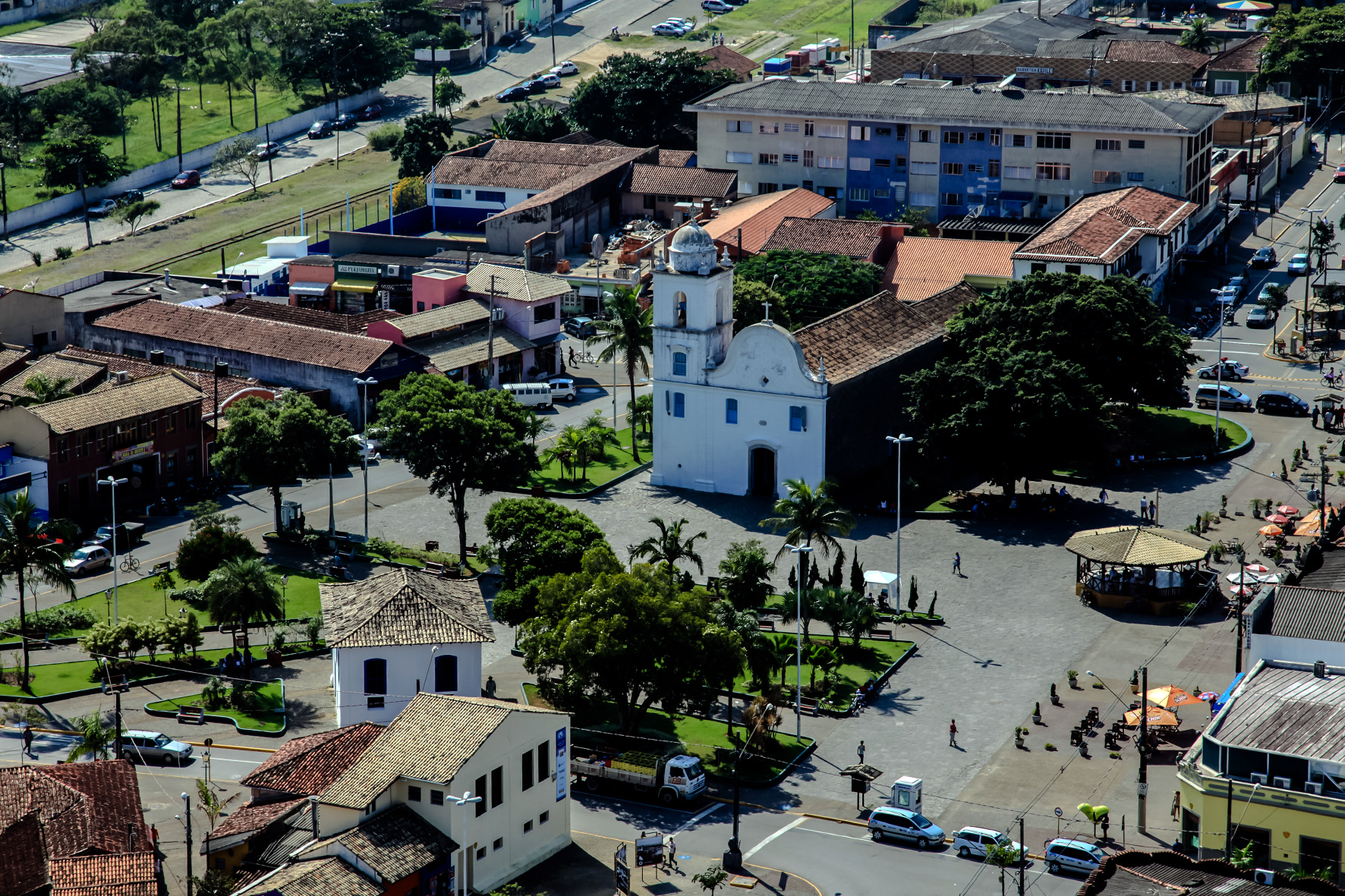
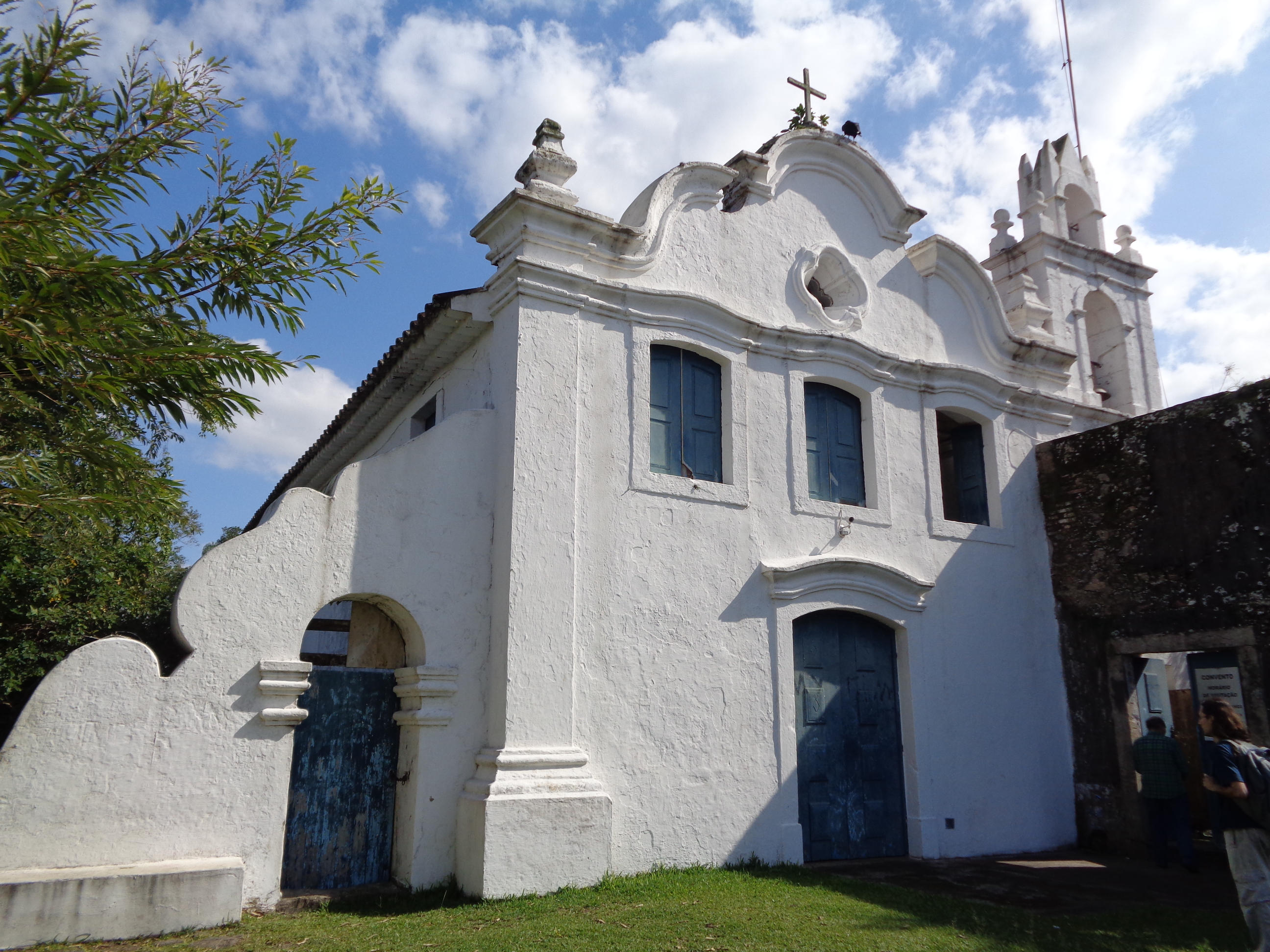
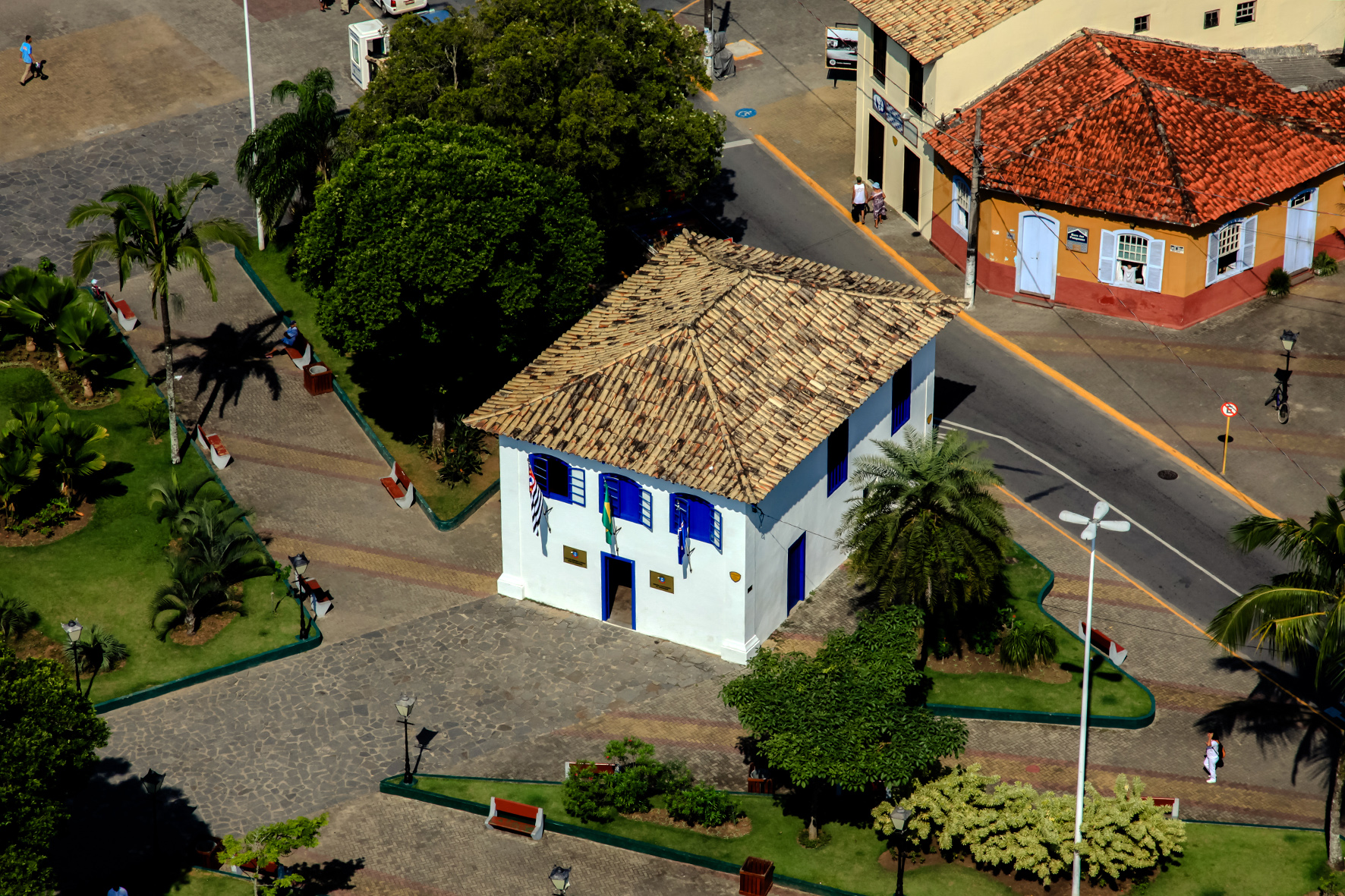
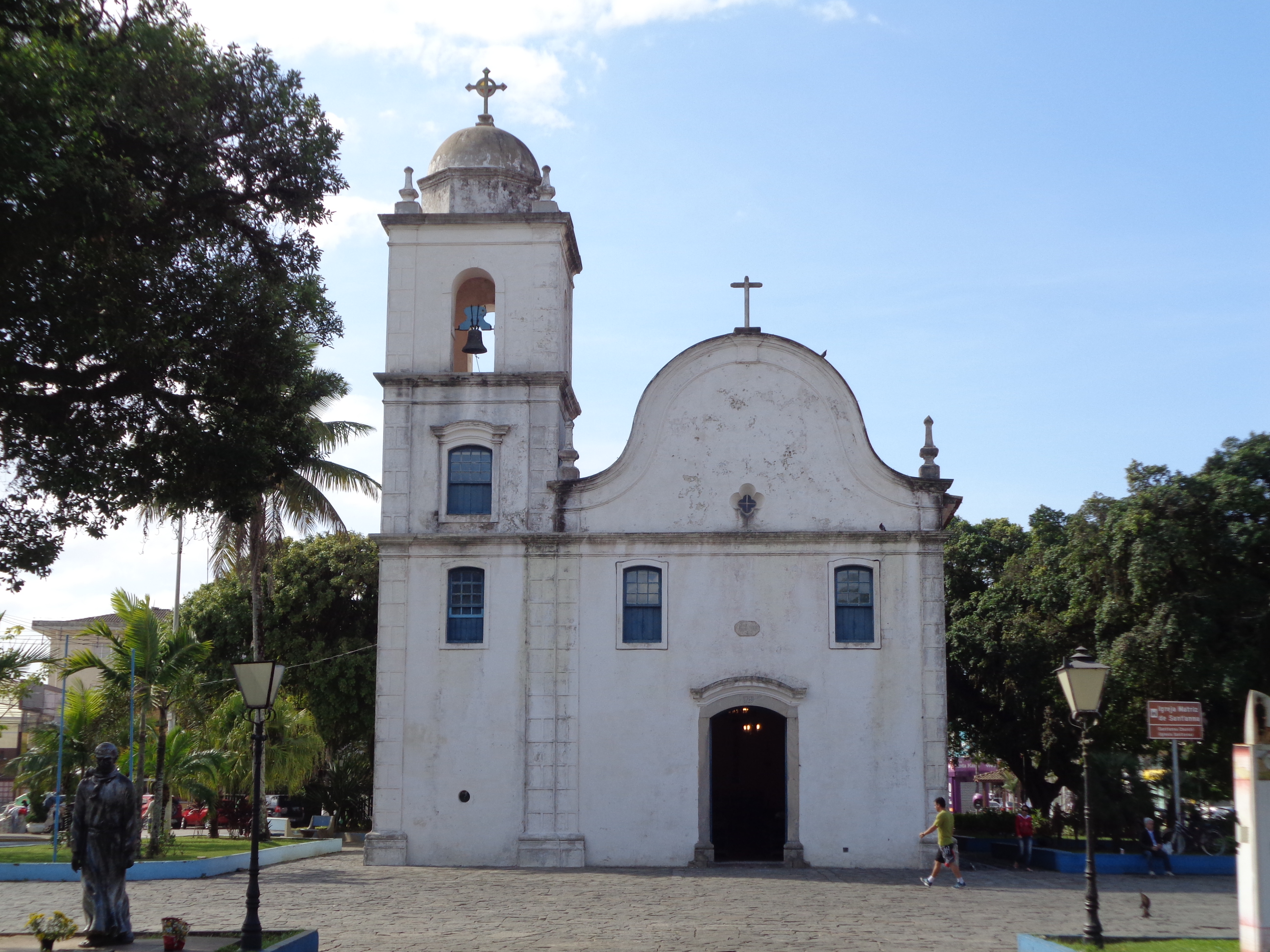
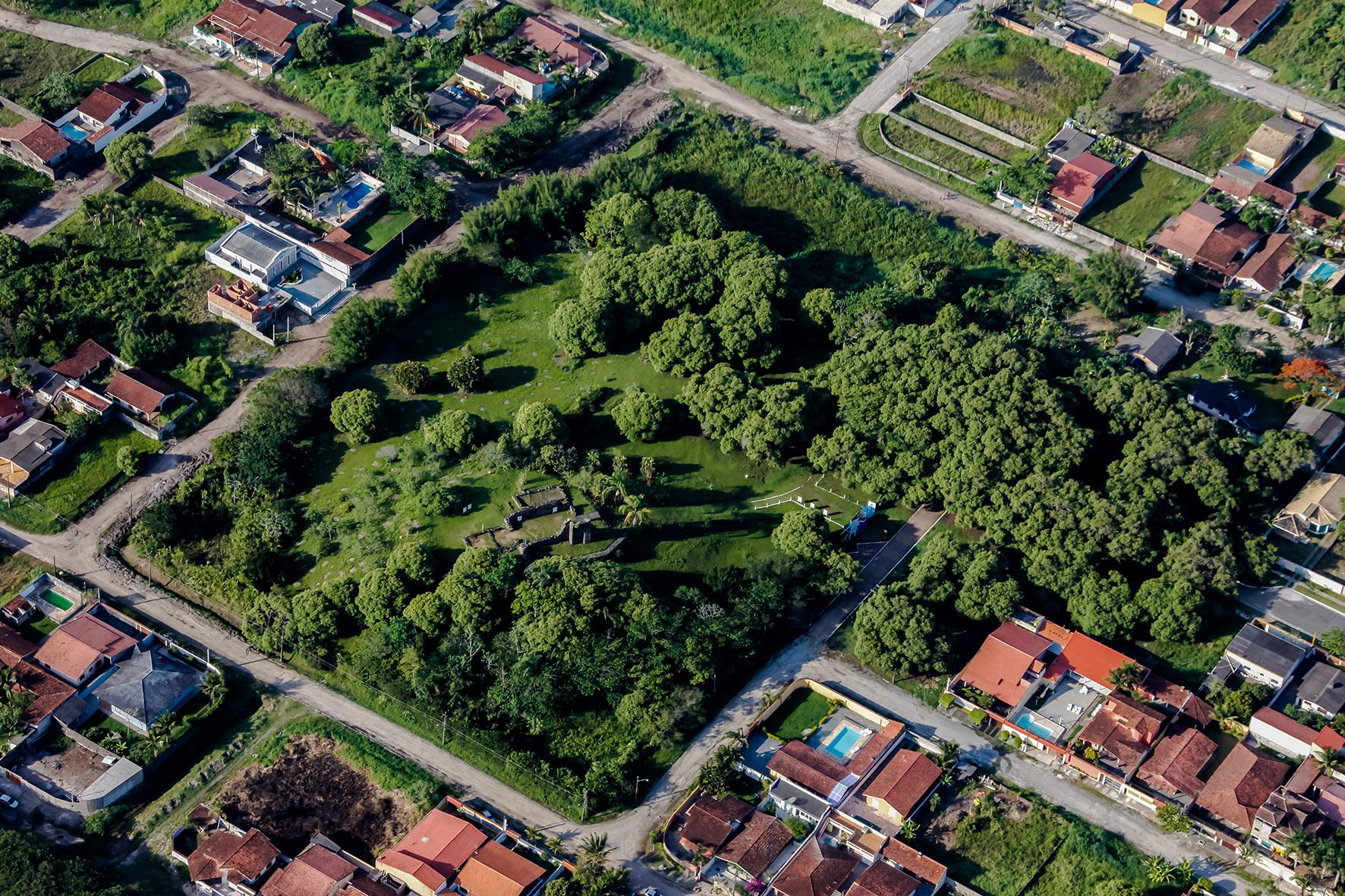
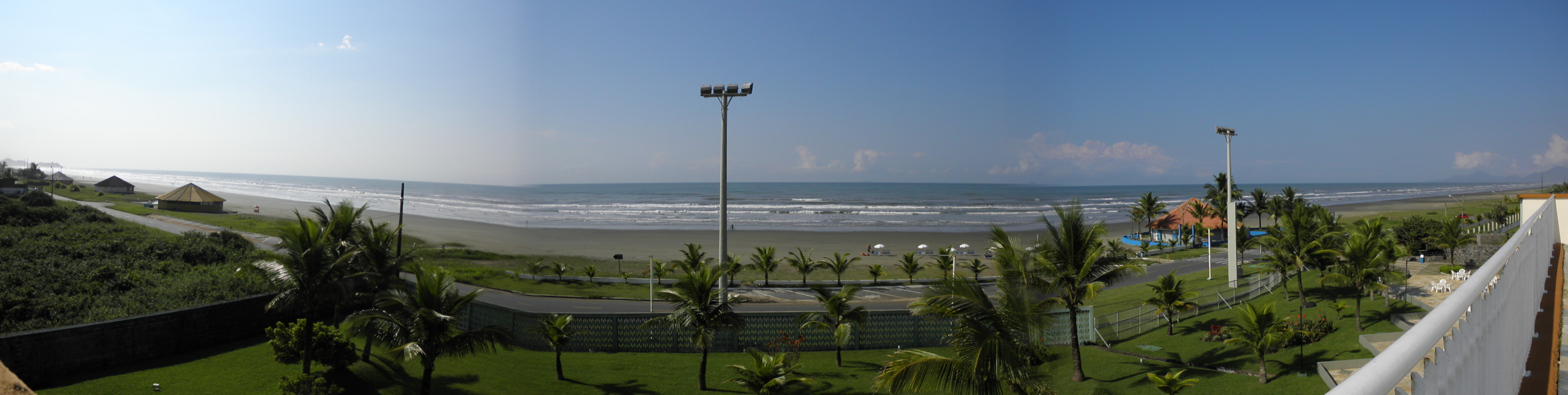

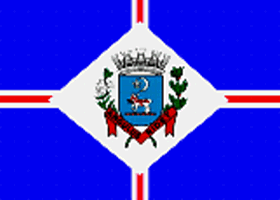
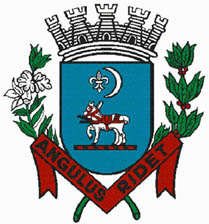
- Flag Coat of arms

- Location in São Paulo

- Location in Brazil
- Coordinates: 24°10′50″S 46°46′58″W
- Country: Brazil
- Region: Southeast
- State: São Paulo
- Metrop. region: Baixada Santista
- Founded: 22 April 1532

Government
  - Mayor: Tiago Rodrigues Cervantes (PSDB)

Area
  - Total: 601.85 km^{2} (232.38 sq mi)
- Elevation: 0 m (0 ft)

Population (2022 Census)
  - Total: 112,476
  - Estimate (2025): 118,495
  - Density: 186.88/km^{2} (484.03/sq mi)
- Time zone: UTC−3 (BRT)
- Postal code: 11740-xxx
- Area code: +55 13
- HDI (2010): 0.745 – high
- Website: www.itanhaem.sp.gov.br

Itanhaém is a municipality in the state of São Paulo in Brazil. Founded on April 22, 1532, it is part of the Metropolitan Region of the Baixada Santista. The population is 112,476 (2022 Census) in an area of 601.85 km^{2} (232.38 sq mi). The elevation is 4 m.

== Geography ==
The name "Itanhaém" comes from the Tupi word itá-nha'ẽ, meaning the plate of rock. Some other Tupinologists (people who study the ancient language Tupi, spoken by the natives back in the 16th century) believe itanhaém means, ita = rock - and nhaém = that cries; due to the rocky coast and the waves that constantly hit it.

Itanhaém was among the greatest tour destinations in the State of São Paulo, in the late-1970s. Located in the Southeastern Brazil, the region is surrounded by the tropical Atlantic Forest that shelters many tropical animals such as colorful birds named Saíra (many subspecies) and animals such as Onças (Brazilian Jaguars), Quatis and Saruês. Itanhaém has many beaches: Downtown beach (Centro or Boca da Barra), Fishermen's Beach (Praia dos Pescadores); Dream Beach (Praia do Sonho); Indians' Well Beach (Poço dos Índios), Peruíbe Beach (Praia do Peruíbe) and Seagull Beach (Praia da Gaivota).

Other beaches are located in Peruíbe, once part of Itanhaém's territory (20 km southwards) and in the Juréia-Itatins Ecological Station, the best preserved and biggest sanctuary of the Atlantic Forest in Brazil, sheltering endemic species such as the Red-tailed amazon (Brazilian Portuguese: papagaio-de-cara-roxa). Among some of the most popular places in Peruibe, there are the falls of Pereque and Paraiso (Paradise), both forming lakes and waterholes deep enough for a dive among pitus (freshwater shrimp) and lambaris (freshwater fish). The most popular beaches are the ones of Barra do Una (this one on the border of the Municipality of Iguape), Carambore, Desertinha, Juquia, Paranapua, Brava, Guarau and Little Guarau ou Guarauzinho; all of them very close to Itanhaém.

The most important river in the region is located in Itanhaém (Itanhaém River) and its tributary streams such as the Black and the White rivers make sinuous paths into the forest towards the foot of the Serra do Mar where there are many, if not hundreds, of waterfalls. Itanhaém can be reached in 1½ hours by car from the city of São Paulo (130,000 km^{2}), the capital of the State of São Paulo.

The municipality contains part of the Tupiniquins Ecological Station.

The city is served by the Antônio Ribeiro Nogueira Jr. Airport.

== Population history ==
Year	Population
2003	79,980
2004	85,294
2009	87,338
2015	96,222
2018	100,496

== Media ==
In telecommunications, the city was served by the Telecomunicações de São Paulo. In July 1998, this company was acquired by Telefónica, which adopted the Vivo brand in 2012. The company is currently an operator of cell phones, fixed lines, internet (fiber optics/4G) and television (satellite and cable).

== See also ==
- Parelheiros-Itanhaém Highway 57
- Roman Catholic Diocese of Santos
- List of municipalities in São Paulo
