= Grajaú (CPTM) =

Railway station in São Paulo, Brazil

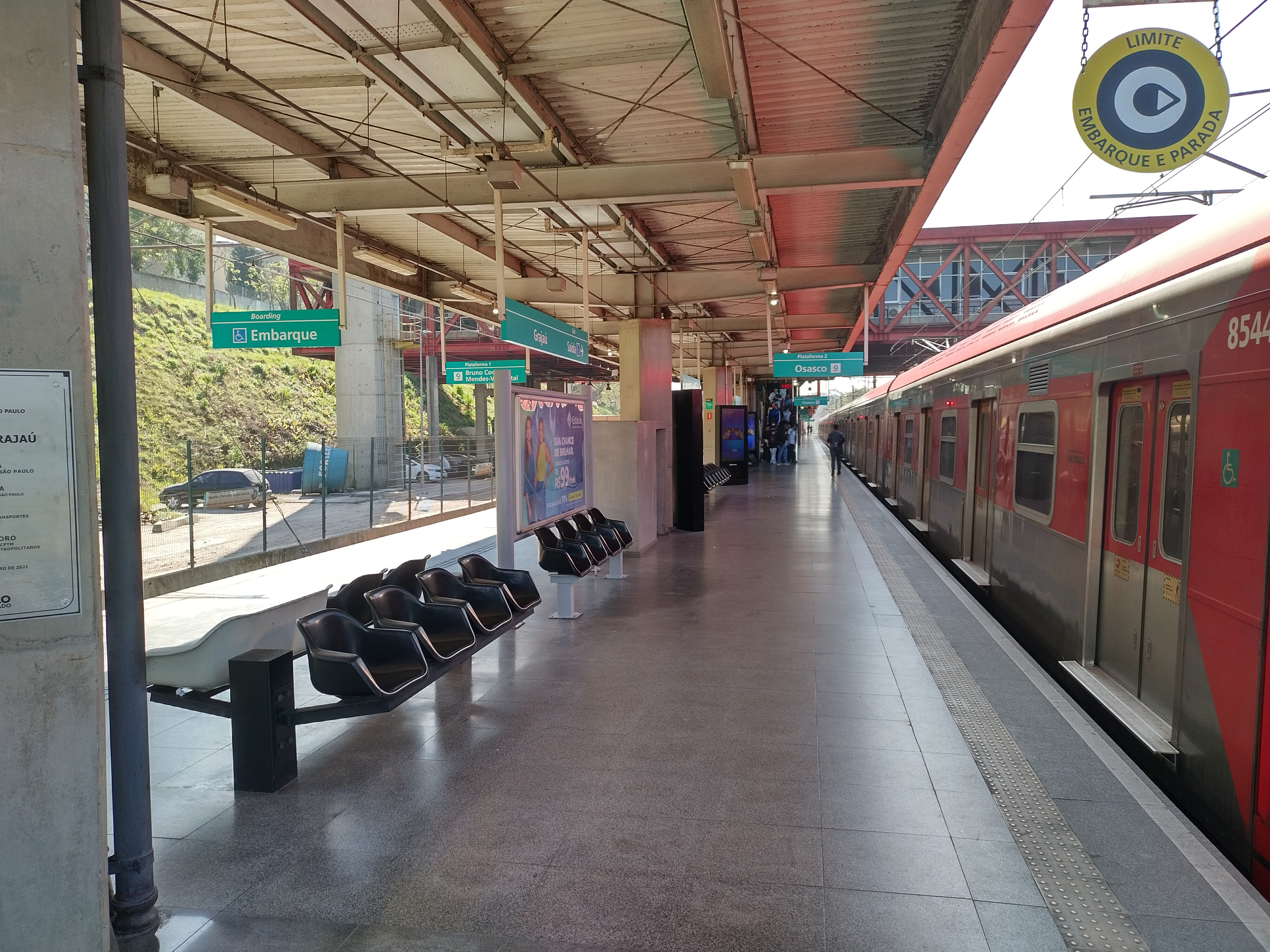
- Grajaú train station in 2022

General information
- Location: R. Giovanni Bononcini, 77; Grajaú; Brazil
- Coordinates: 23.737377°S 46.697608°W
- Owner: Government of the State of São Paulo
- Operator: ViaMobilidade Linhas 8 e 9 (Motiva)
- Platforms: Side platforms (1992–2001); Island platform (2008–present)
- Connections: Grajaú Bus Terminal

Construction
- Structure type: At-grade

Other information
- Station code: GRA

History
- Opened: 26 September 1996; 29 years ago
- Closed: December 2001; 24 years ago
- Rebuilt: 21 April 2008; 18 years ago

Services
Preceding station	São Paulo Metropolitan Trains	Following station
Primavera-Interlagos towards Osasco	Line 9	Bruno Covas/Mendes-Vila Natal towards Varginha
Track layout
Location

Grajaú is a train station on ViaMobilidade Linhas 8 e 9 Line 9-Emerald, in the district of Grajaú in São Paulo.

== History ==
Grajaú station was opened by FEPASA in 1992, to attend the district of Grajaú, as part of the Jurubatuba-Varginha operational extension. Initially it was composed of two wood platforms, built along with a pontillion which crossed over Avenida Belmira Marin. The two platforms had a ravine behind them with an inclination of approximately 5 metres (16 ft), considering the avenue level. The old station was deactivated in December 2001, along with the traffic of Jurubatuba-Varginha branch, and was demolished by CPTM for the construction of Line 9-Emerald above the old FEPASA South Line.

In 2008, a larger and modernized new station was built by CPTM in the same place of the old one and kept the name Grajaú, with free access to the SPTrans urban bus terminal.

== See also ==
- Grajaú (district of São Paulo)
- Line 9 (CPTM)
- Subprefecture of Capela do Socorro
