= Colônia crater =

Impact crater in São Paulo, Brazil

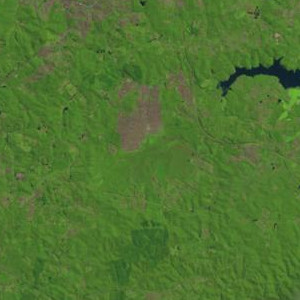
- 2017 Landsat image of Colônia crater

- Location within Brazil
- Location: São Paulo, Parelheiros, São Paulo, Brazil; 23°52′15″S 46°42′30″W

Impact crater structure
- Confidence: Confirmed
- Diameter: 3.6 km (2.2 mi)
- Age: 5 to 36 Ma; Neogene
- Exposed: Yes
- Drilled: Yes

The Colônia crater is a recently confirmed impact crater located in the municipality of São Paulo, Brazil. It is a round bowl-shaped depression, without any obvious central bulge, with a diameter of about 3.6 kilometres (2.2 mi), bounded by a circular ring of hills about 125 metres (410 ft) high relative to the inner depression. Its approximate location is 23°52′S 46°42′W, 770 metres (2,530 ft) above sea level. The name comes from the town district of Colônia located just north of the feature.

== Geology and ecology ==
Some geologists believe that the feature was created by the impact of a meteorite with a diameter of about 200 metres (660 ft). It was formed between 1 million and 20 million years ago, in crystalline basement rocks 600 to 700 million years old. The Earth Impact Database gives a range of 36 to 5 Ma. In any case, it would be one of the youngest South American impact craters known. It is partially filled by peat with a maximum depth of 275 metres (902 ft), which provides a precious record of the ancient environment. The upper 8 metres (26 ft), in particular, have provided a detailed climate and ecological record of the last 130,000 years; the complete record may stretch back to 2.5 million years ago.

Data from seismic and other surveys indicate that below the sediment there are about 50 to 65 metres (164 to 213 ft) of fragmented rock deposits, and another 50 m of shocked or deformed basement rock. Sediment analysis indicate that until 18,000 years ago a lake occupied the central part of the crater, which has become a swamp. The crater is drained towards the east by the Vargem Grande creek into the adjacent Billings Reservoir.

The tentative identification as an impact crater is based mainly on geomorphology, faulting patterns, and on the exclusion of other possible formation mechanisms. In particular, there are no carbonate rocks that could produce karstic sinkholes. As of 2011 there were no reports of definite evidence, such as shatter cones or shocked quartz. To find such evidence one would have to drill through the sediment fill.

== Urbanization and legal status ==
The Colônia crater is located in the suburban Parelheiros region of the sprawling São Paulo metropolitan area, about 35 kilometres (22 mi) from the city's center. Besides the central swamp, the crater encloses remains of the native Atlantic rainforest. Starting in 1989, the northern part of the crater has been gradually occupied by irregular housing that comprise the Vargem Grande neighborhood, now home to 35,000 to 40,000 people. To prevent further degradation, the crater has been declared a protected natural landmark, registered in 1995 by the CONDEPHAAT. Its southern part was incorporated to the Capivari Monos Municipal Parkland in 1996.

== See also ==
- List of impact craters on Earth
