= SP-57 (São Paulo highway) =

Highway in São Paulo

SP-057

Route information
- Length: 9.540 km (5.928 mi)

Location
- Country: Brazil
- State: São Paulo

Highway system
- Highways in Brazil; Federal; São Paulo State Highways

The SP-57 is a highway in the eastern and the southeastern parts of the state of São Paulo in Brazil. The highway is unnamed on its entire length. The highway runs from BR-116 up to Siderúrgica (Ponte de Ferro).

== See also ==
- Parelheiros
- Itanhaém
