= Guarapiranga =

Represa de Guarapiranga
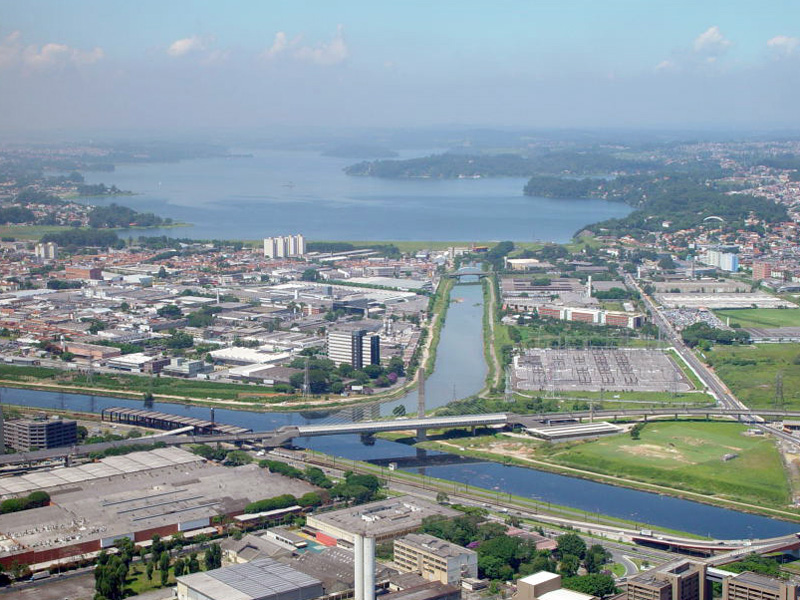
- Guarapiranga dam in bird's-eye view Photo by: Hamilton Breternitz Furtado

- Location within São Paulo state Location within Brazil
- Interactive map of Represa de Guarapiranga
- Location: São Paulo
- Coordinates: 23.7269°S 46.7352°W
- Type: reservoir
- Primary inflows: River Guarapiranga
- Primary outflows: 13.8 m^{3}/s (490 cu ft/s)
- Catchment area: 631 km^{2} (244 sq mi)
- Basin countries: Brazil
- Max. length: 19.17 kilometres (11.91 mi)
- Max. width: 2.67 kilometres (1.66 mi)
- Surface area: 26.6 km^{2} (10.3 sq mi)
- Water volume: 171 million cubic metres (139,000 acre⋅ft)
- Islands: several islands

The Reservoir of Guarapiranga (Represa de Guarapiranga) is a reservoir in the southern area of the city of São Paulo, in the State of São Paulo, Brazil.

== Construction ==
The Reservoir of Guarapiranga was constructed in 1906 by the São Paulo Tramway, Light and Power Company, also known as "Light", which was the company responsible for the regions supply of electrical energy at that time. In 1928, Guarapiranga began being used as a reservoir for potable water distribution.

== Water supply ==
The reservoir is supplied by the River Guarapiranga and other smaller rivers and brooks, traversing areas of the cities of São Paulo, Itapecerica da Serra, and Embu-Guaçu. It was constructed originally to attend the necessities of the production of electrical energy in the Parnaíba Hydroelectric generating plant. It is currently utilized for the water supply for the Greater São Paulo by the Companhia de Saneamento Basico do Estado de São Paulo (SABESP), a Brazilian state owned utility that provides water and sewage services. Guarapiranga is also utilized as a flood control mechanism and as a place of leisure. There are artificial beaches and marinas in the reservoir's peripheral areas.

== Current use ==
Between the 1980s and the 1990s, the absence of clear political laws determining use and occupation of the area contributed to the creation of clandestine and irregular neighborhoods around the reservoir. Untreated human waste and sewage contaminated rivers and brooks that fed into the reservoir. The cleaning of the brooks and rivers and in the removal of the irregular housings will require substantial funding by SABESP.
