= Juquitiba =

- Municipality
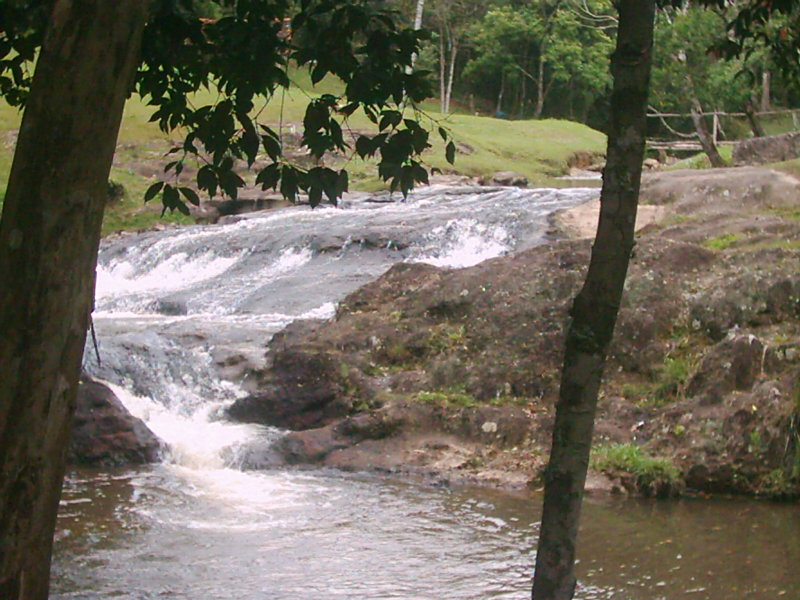

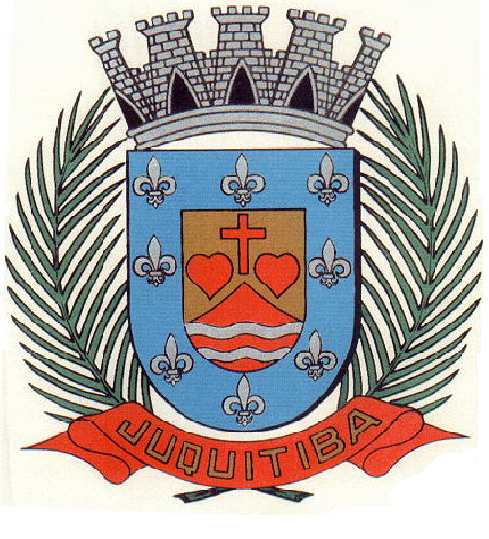
- Flag Coat of arms

- Location in São Paulo state

- Location in Brazil
- Coordinates: 23°55′55″S 47°4′7″W
- Country: Brazil
- Region: Southeast Brazil
- State: São Paulo
- Metropolitan Region: São Paulo

Area
  - Total: 522.17 km^{2} (201.61 sq mi)

Population (2020)
  - Total: 31,646
  - Density: 60.605/km^{2} (156.97/sq mi)
- Time zone: UTC−3 (BRT)
- Website: www.juquitiba.sp.gov.br

Juquitiba is a suburban municipality in the southeastern part of the state of São Paulo in Brazil. It is part of the Metropolitan Region of São Paulo. The population is 31,646 (2020 est.) in an area of 522.17 km^{2} (201.61 sq mi). This name comes from the Tupi language. The southern part of the municipality is heavily forested with the Serra do Mar mountain range, the central and the northern parts are predominantly hilly.

The municipality contains part of the 488,865-hectare (1,208,010-acre) Serra do Mar Environmental Protection Area, created in 1984.

== Population history ==
| Year | Population |
|---|---|
| 2003 | 28,458 |
| 2004 | 29,789 |
| 2015 | 30,642 |

== Media ==
In telecommunications, the city was served by Companhia de Telecomunicações do Estado de São Paulo until 1975, when it began to be served by Telecomunicações de São Paulo. In July 1998, this company was acquired by Telefónica, which adopted the Vivo brand in 2012.

The company is currently an operator of cell phones, fixed lines, internet (fiber optics/4G) and television (satellite and cable).

== Tourism ==
Tourism is a strong point of Juquitiba. Just 70 km from the state capital, offers contact with the animals and plants of the Atlantic forest. It offers various adventure sports like river rafting Juquiá, for example, along with numerous trails and waterfalls. The municipality contains hostels, campsites and fishing to leisure and hospitality.

== See also ==
- List of municipalities in São Paulo
