= South Zone of São Paulo =

Coordinates: 23°39′15″S 46°39′33″W

South Zone of São Paulo Zona Sul
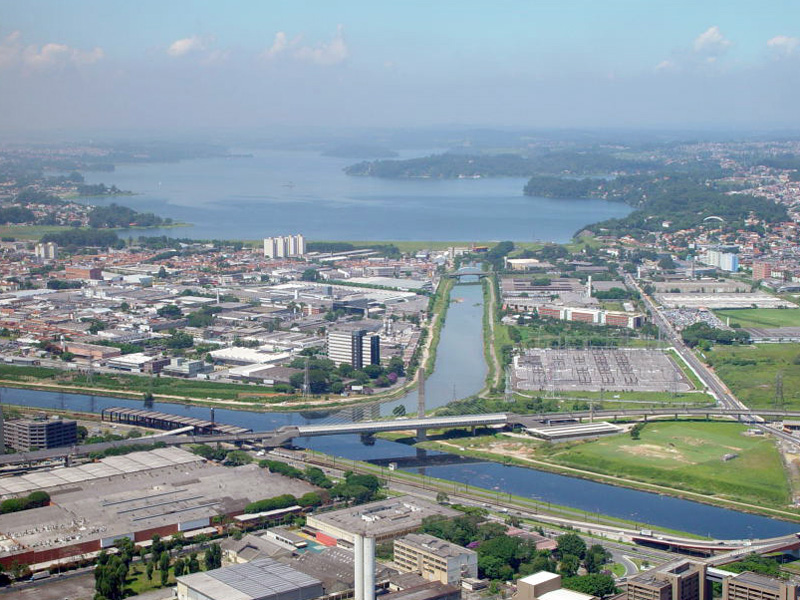

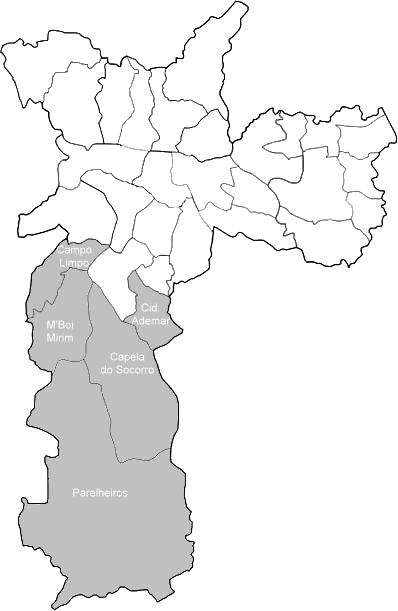
- Location of the South Zone in São Paulo
- Country: Brazil
- State: São Paulo
- City: São Paulo
- Subprefectures: South Zone: Capela do Socorro; Campo Limpo; Cidade Ademar; Parelheiros; M'Boi Mirim

The South Zone is an Administrative Zone of São Paulo, Brazil.
