= Embu-Guaçu =

Municipality in the state of São Paulo in Brazil

- Municipality
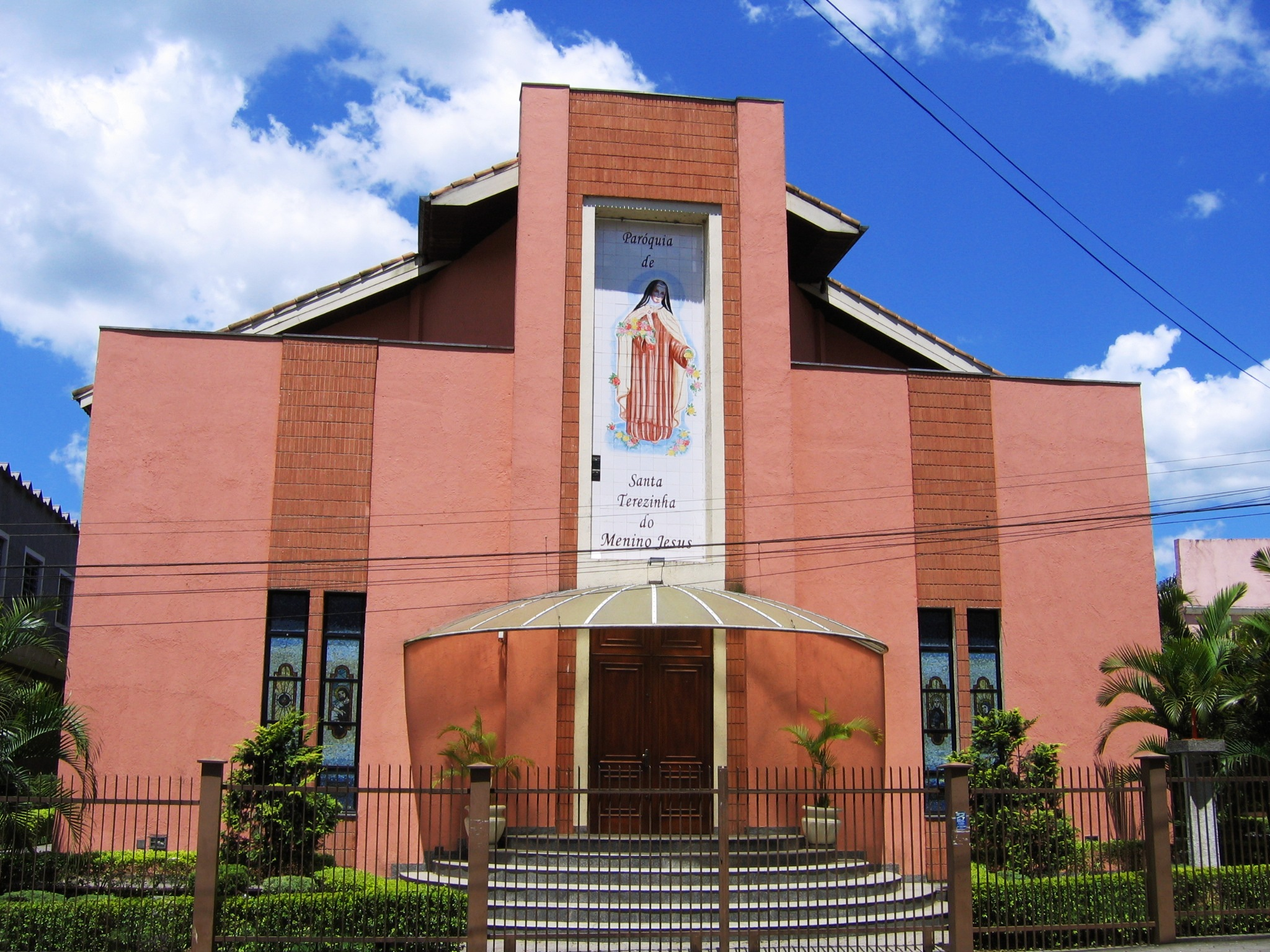

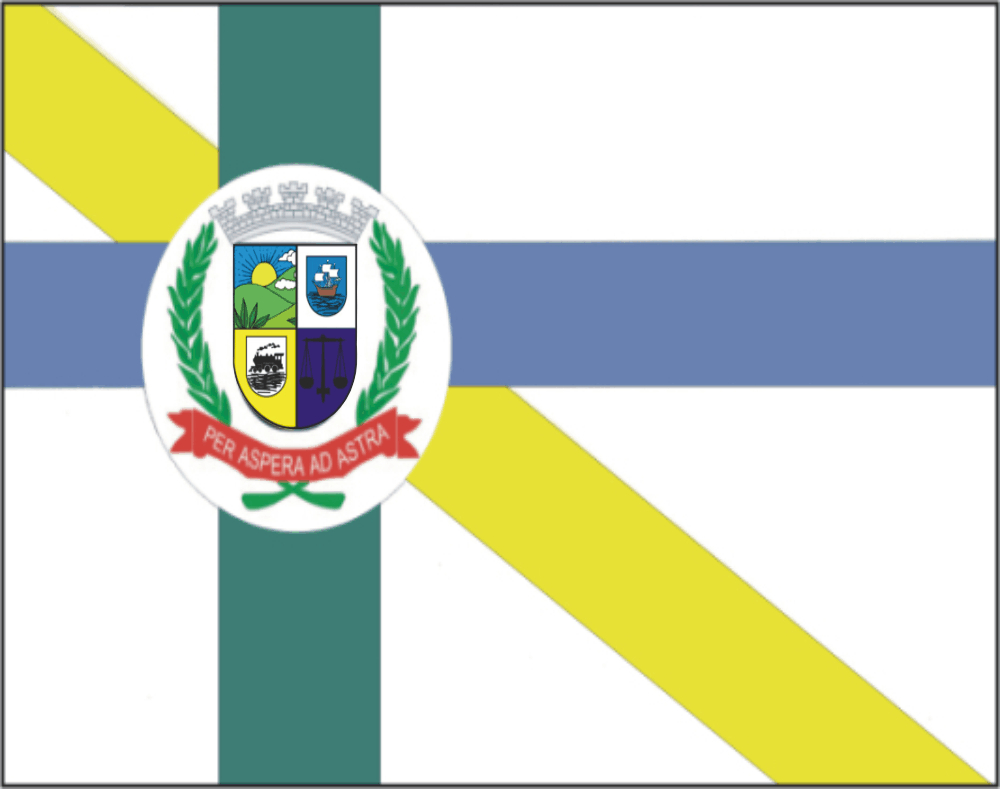
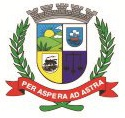
- Flag Coat of arms

- Location in São Paulo state

- Location in Brazil
- Coordinates: 23°49′55″S 46°48′42″W
- Country: Brazil
- Region: Southeast Brazil
- State: São Paulo
- Metropolitan Region: São Paulo

Area
  - Total: 155.64 km^{2} (60.09 sq mi)
- Elevation: 408 m (1,339 ft)

Population (2020)
  - Total: 69,901
  - Density: 449.12/km^{2} (1,163.2/sq mi)
- Time zone: UTC−3 (BRT)

Embu-Guaçu is a municipality in the state of São Paulo in Brazil. It is part of the Metropolitan Region of São Paulo. The population is 69,901 (2020 est.) in an area of 155.64 km^{2}. The elevation is 408 m.

== Media ==
In telecommunications, the city was served by Telecomunicações de São Paulo. In July 1998, this company was acquired by Telefónica, which adopted the Vivo brand in 2012. The company is currently an operator of cell phones, fixed lines, internet (fiber optics/4G) and television (satellite and cable).

== See also ==
- List of municipalities in São Paulo
