= Diocese of Santo Amaro =

Catholic ecclesiastical territory

Diocese of Santo Amaro Dioecesis Sancti Mauri

Catholic
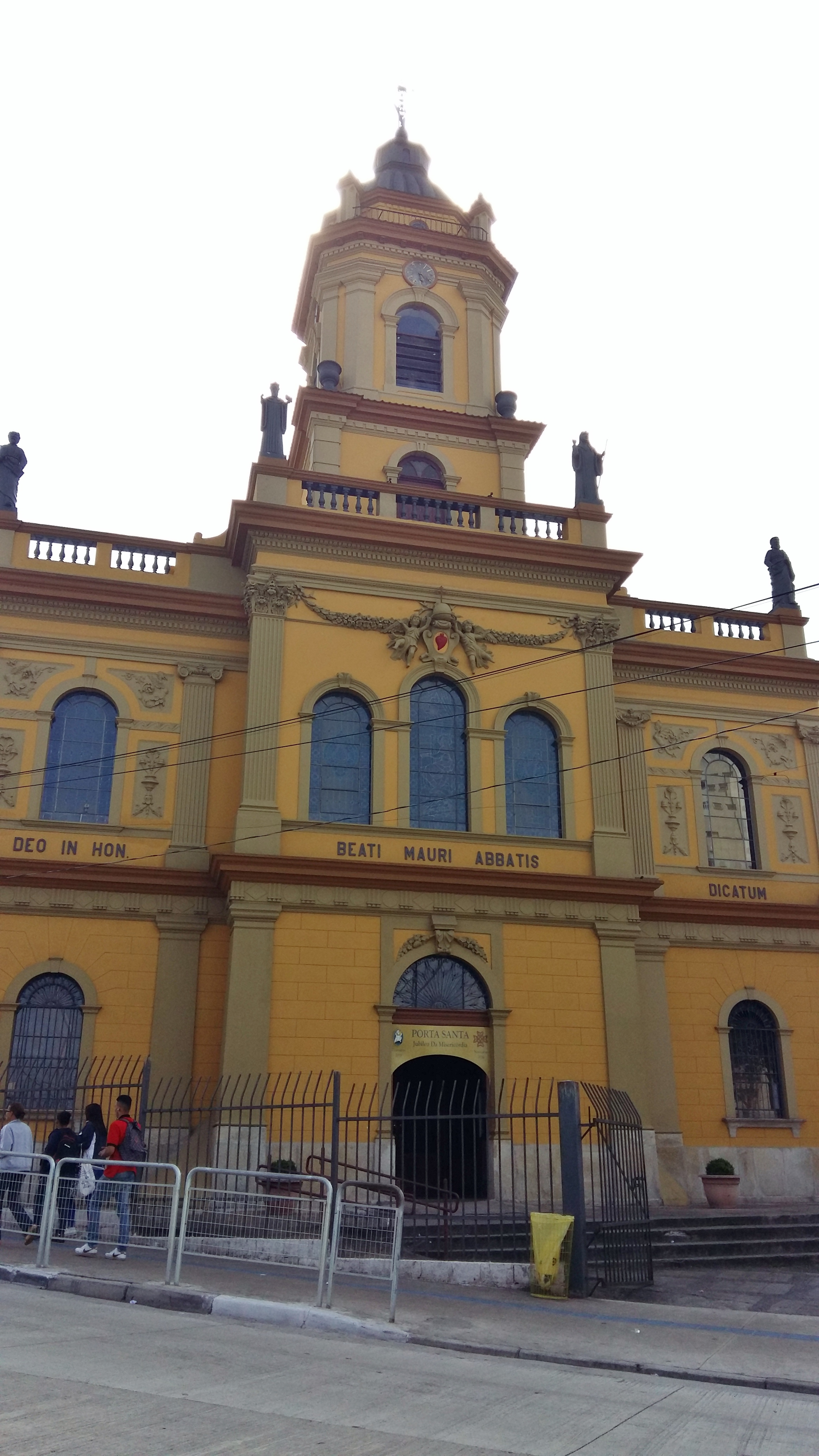
- Catedral Santo Amaro in 2016

Location
- Country: Brazil
- Ecclesiastical province: São Paulo

Statistics
- Area: 600 km^{2} (230 sq mi)
- Population: Total; Catholics: (as of 2004); 2,800,000; 1,900,000 (67.9%)

Information
- Rite: Latin Rite
- Established: 15 March 1989 (37 years ago)
- Cathedral: Catedral Santo Amaro

Current leadership
- Pope: Leo XIV
- Bishop: Giuseppe Negri, P.I.M.E.
- Metropolitan Archbishop: Odilo Scherer
- Auxiliary Bishops: Marcelo Antônio da Silva
- Bishops emeritus: Fernando Antônio Figueiredo, O.F.M.

Website
- diocesedesantoamaro.org.br

The Roman Catholic Diocese of Santo Amaro (Latin: Dioecesis Sancti Mauri) is a diocese located in the district of Santo Amaro, in the city and the ecclesiastical province of São Paulo in Brazil.

== History ==
- 15 March 1989: Established as Diocese of Santo Amaro from the Metropolitan Archdiocese of São Paulo

== Leadership ==
Bishops of Santo Amaro

- Fernando Antônio Figueiredo, O.F.M. (14 March 1989 – 2 December 2015)
- José Negri, P.I.M.E. (2 December 2015 – present)
  - Coadjutor 2014–2015

Auxiliary bishops

- Luciano Bergamin, C.R.L. (2000–2002), appointed Bishop of Nova Iguaçu
- Marcelo Antônio da Silva (2023-).

Other priests of this diocese who became bishop

- José Aparecido Gonçalves de Almeida, appointed Auxiliary Bishop of Brasília in 2013
