= Portela (surname) =

Portela is a surname of Iberian origin. Notable people with the name include:

- Adrián Portela (born 1986), Argentine handball player
- Alê Portela (born 1988), Brazilian politician
- Ângela Portela (born 1962), Brazilian politician
- Antonio Portela (born 1966), Puerto Rican swimmer
- Carlos García Portela (1921–2011), Puerto Rican lawyer, politician and senator
- Consuelo Portela Audet (1885–1959), Cuban-born Spanish cuplé singer
- Diogo Portela (born 1988), Brazilian darts player
- Eduardo Portela (1934–2026), Spanish basketball player, coach, and executive
- Edurne Portela Camino (born 1974), Spanish academic
- Ena Lucía Portela (born 1972), Cuban novelist, essayist, and writer of short stories
- Francisco Portela (1833–1913), Brazilian physician and politician
- Henrique Portela (fl. 1920–1929), Portuguese football midfielder
- José M. Portela (born 1949), officer of the United States Air Force
- Juan Portela (born 1984), Spanish football defender
- Lincoln Portela (born 1953), Brazilian politician, television and radio personality, and pastor
- Manuel Portela Valladares 1868–1952), Spanish political figure
- Maria Portela (born 1988), Brazilian middleweight judoka
- María Carmen Portela (1898–1983), Argentine-born Uruguayan engraver and sculptor
- Miguel Portela (born 1974), Portuguese rugby union player
- Pablo Sebastián Portela (born 1980), Argentine handball player
- Teresa Portela (disambiguation), multiple people, including:
  - Teresa Portela (Portuguese canoeist) (born 1987), Portuguese sprint canoeist
  - Teresa Portela (Spanish canoeist) (born 1982), Spanish sprint canoeist
