= Rosalvo Cordeiro de Lima =

Brazilian Roman Catholic bishop

The Most Reverend Rosalvo Cordeiro de Lima
- Bishop of Itapipoca
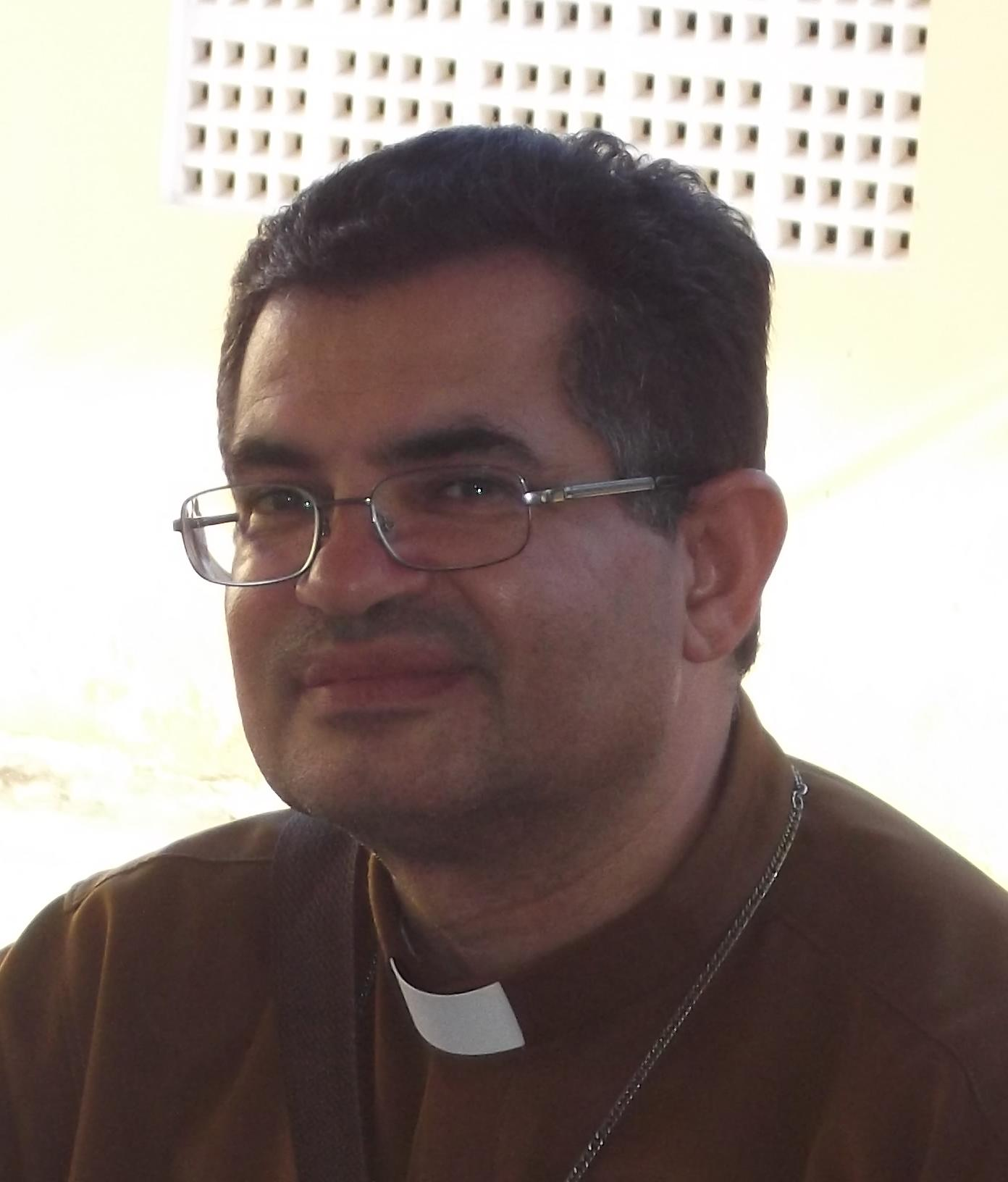
- Church: Catholic Church
- Diocese: Itapipoca
- Appointed: 7 October 2020
- Installed: 5 December 2020
- Predecessor: Antônio Roberto Cavuto
- Previous posts: Titular Bishop of Castellum Tatroportus and Auxiliary Bishop of Fortaleza (2011–2020)

Orders
- Ordination: 1 November 1992 by Paulo Antonino Mascarenhas Roxo
- Consecration: 25 March 2011 by José Antônio Aparecido Tosi Marques

Personal details
- Born: 25 January 1962 (age 64) União dos Palmares, Alagoas, Brazil
- Education: Faculty of Theology of Our Lady of the Assumption in São Paulo
- Motto: In Verbo Autem Tuo Laxabo Retia

Rosalvo Cordeiro de Lima (born 25 January 1962) is a Brazilian Roman Catholic prelate who has served as Bishop of Itapipoca since 2020. He previously served as an auxiliary bishop of the Archdiocese of Fortaleza and as titular bishop of Castellum Tatroportus since 2011 until 2020.

== Early life and education ==
Rosalvo Cordeiro de Lima was born on 25 January 1962 in União dos Palmares, in the Brazilian state of Alagoas. He studied philosophy at the Sagrado Coração de Jesus Seminary in Mogi das Cruzes, and theology at the Faculty of Theology at the Nossa Senhora da Assunção in São Paulo.

== Priesthood ==
Lima was ordained a priest on 1 November 1992 in Arujá, in the Diocese of Mogi das Cruzes. Following his ordination, he served as parish vicar of Jesus Cristo Redentor do Homem in Itaquaquecetuba from 1992 to 1993. He subsequently served as coordinator of vocational pastoral ministry in the Diocese of Mogi das Cruzes from 1994 to 2000 and as parish administrator of Jesus Cristo Redentor do Homem from 1994 to 1997.

In 1997 he became parish priest of São José in Salesópolis. From 2000 to 2011 he also served as spiritual director of the seminarians of the Diocese of Mogi das Cruzes.

== Episcopate ==
=== Auxiliary bishop of Fortaleza ===
On 2 February 2011, Pope Benedict XVI appointed Lima auxiliary bishop of the Archdiocese of Fortaleza and titular bishop of Castellum Tatroportus. At the time of his appointment, he was parish priest of São José in Salesópolis.

He was consecrated a bishop on 25 March 2011 in Mogi das Cruzes. The principal consecrator was José Antônio Aparecido Tosi Marques, Archbishop of Fortaleza, with Emílio Pignoli and Paulo Antonino Mascarenhas Roxo serving as co-consecrators. His episcopal motto is In Verbo Autem Tuo Laxabo Retia, translated as “At your word I will let down the nets”, from Luke 5:5.

During his service in Fortaleza, Lima was involved with pastoral responsibilities within the archdiocese and served in the CNBB's Regional Northeast 1, including work connected with social pastoral activities and later the Commission for the Ministry of Ordained Ministers and Consecrated Life.

=== Bishop of Itapipoca ===
On 7 October 2020, Pope Francis appointed Lima Bishop of the Diocese of Itapipoca, accepting the resignation of Antônio Roberto Cavuto from the pastoral government of the diocese.
