= Benedito Francisco de Albuquerque =

Brazilian Catholic bishop (born 1928)

The Most Reverend Benedito Francisco de Albuquerque
- Bishop Emeritus of Itapipoca
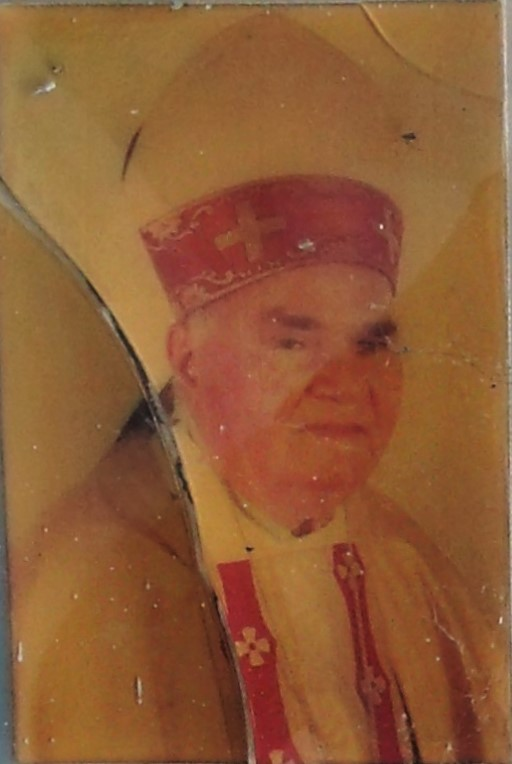
- Church: Catholic Church
- Diocese: Diocese of Itapipoca
- Appointed: 4 January 1985
- Term ended: 25 May 2005
- Predecessor: Paulo Eduardo Andrade Ponte
- Successor: Antônio Roberto Cavuto

Orders
- Ordination: 8 December 1953
- Consecration: 5 May 1985 by Cardinal Aloísio Lorscheider

Personal details
- Born: Benedito Francisco de Albuquerque; 24 July 1928 (age 98) Coreaú, Ceará, Brazil
- Education: Pontifical Gregorian University
- Motto: Evangelizare pauperibus

Benedito Francisco de Albuquerque (born 24 July 1928) is a Brazilian prelate of the Catholic Church who served as Bishop of Itapipoca from 1985 until his retirement in 2005. He holds the title of Bishop Emeritus of Itapipoca.

== Biography ==
Benedito Francisco de Albuquerque was born on 24 July 1928 in Coreaú, in the state of Ceará, Brazil.

He was ordained a priest on 8 December 1953 at the Cathedral of Sobral, after having been ordained a deacon earlier that same year. His first Mass was celebrated on 13 December 1953 in his hometown of Coreaú.

Albuquerque completed studies in sociology at the Pontifical Gregorian University in Rome.

On 4 January 1985, he was appointed Bishop of the Diocese of Itapipoca by Pope John Paul II, succeeding Bishop Paulo Eduardo Andrade Ponte. He received episcopal consecration on 5 May 1985 at the Cathedral of Our Lady of Mercies in Itapipoca, with Cardinal Aloísio Lorscheider as the principal consecrator.

During his episcopate, Albuquerque also served as President of the National Conference of Bishops of Brazil (CNBB) Regional Northeast 1 and was involved in pastoral and social initiatives in the region of Ceará.

Upon reaching the canonical age of retirement, Pope Benedict XVI accepted his resignation from the pastoral governance of the Diocese of Itapipoca on 25 May 2005. He was succeeded by Bishop Antônio Roberto Cavuto.

In retirement, Albuquerque has continued to participate in ecclesial events in the diocese. In 2018, celebrations were held marking his 90th birthday.

== See also ==
- Diocese of Itapipoca
- Catholic Church in Brazil
