= Gilson Machado Neto =

Brazilian entrepreneur and politician

Gilson Machado
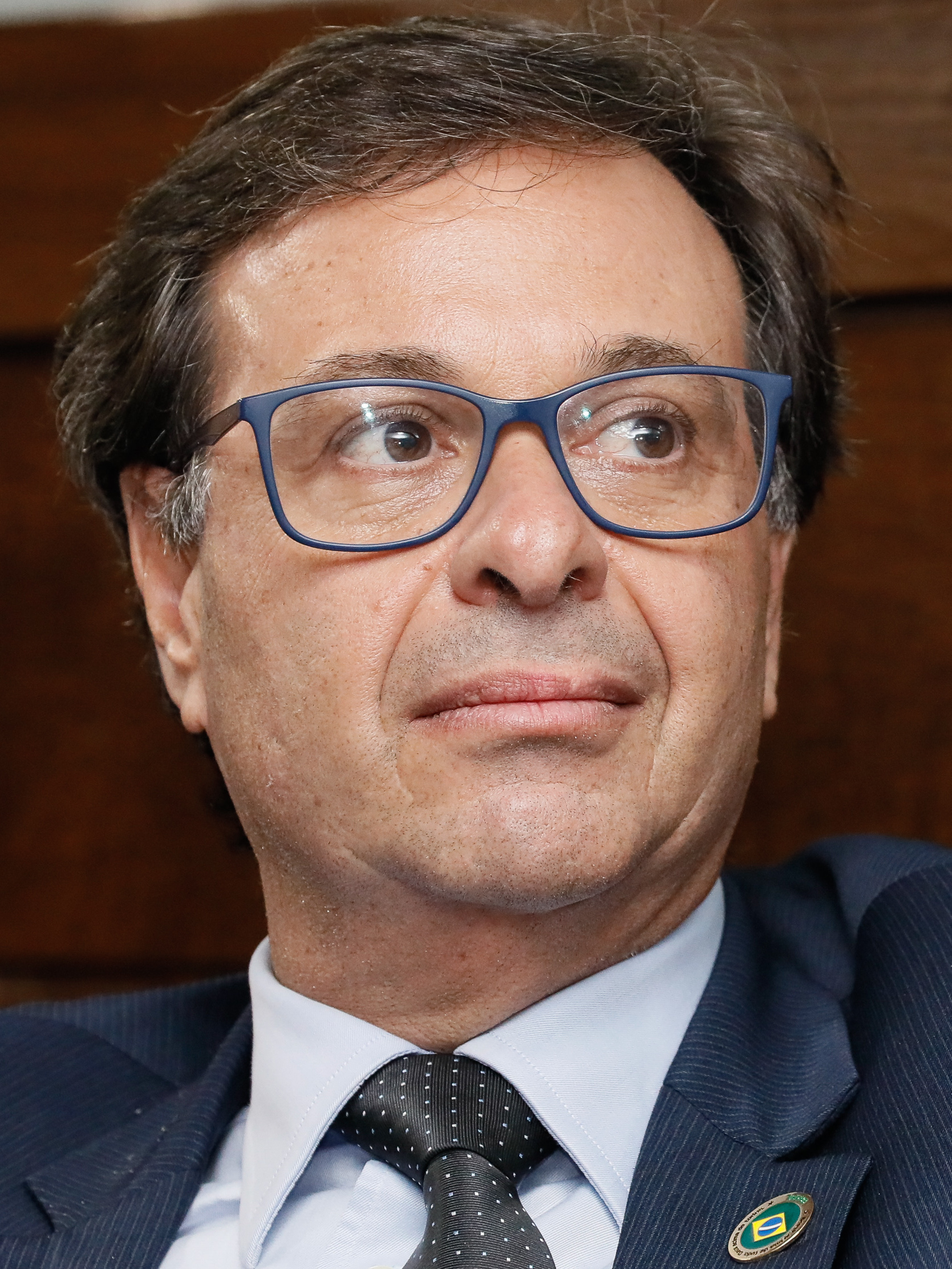
- Machado Neto in May 2019

Member-elect of the Chamber of Deputies
- Assuming office 1 February 2027

Chair of the Brazilian Tourist Board
- In office 17 November 2022 – 13 January 2023
- President: Jair Bolsonaro
- Preceded by: Silvio Santos do Nascimento
- Succeeded by: Marcelo Freixo
- In office 20 May 2019 – 9 December 2020
- Preceded by: Leônidas José de Oliveira
- Succeeded by: Carlos Alberto Gomes de Brito

Minister of Tourism
- In office 9 December 2020 – 31 March 2022
- President: Jair Bolsonaro
- Preceded by: Marcelo Álvaro Antônio
- Succeeded by: Carlos Alberto Gomes de Brito

Personal details
- Born: Gilson Machado Guimarães Neto Recife, Pernambuco, Brazil
- Party: PODE (2026–present)
- Other political affiliations: DEM (2005–2011; 2016–2018); PHS (2011–2013); PMDB (2013–2016); PSL (2018–2020); PSC (2020–2022); PL (2022–2026)
- Children: Gilson Machado Filho
- Profession: Entrepreneur

Gilson Machado Guimarães Neto, commonly known as Gilson Machado Neto, is a Brazilian entrepreneur, politician and was the Minister of Tourism under the government of Jair Bolsonaro.

He replaced the licensed federal deputy Marcelo Álvaro Antônio (PSL).

== Personal life ==
Rural producer, entrepreneur, veterinary and leader of the band Forró da Brucelose, the minister was also President of Embratur. He is also the nephew of the deceased constituent parliamentary Gilson Machado Filho.

Political offices
Preceded by Paulo Senise	President of Embratur; 2019–2020	Succeeded by Carlos Brito
Preceded by Marcelo Álvaro Antônio	Minister of Tourism; 2020–2022	Succeeded by Carlos Brito
