= Archdiocese of Ribeirão Preto =

Catholic ecclesiastical territory

Coordinates: 21.1782°S 47.8108°W

Archdiocese of Ribeirão Preto Archidioecesis Rivi Nigri

Catholic
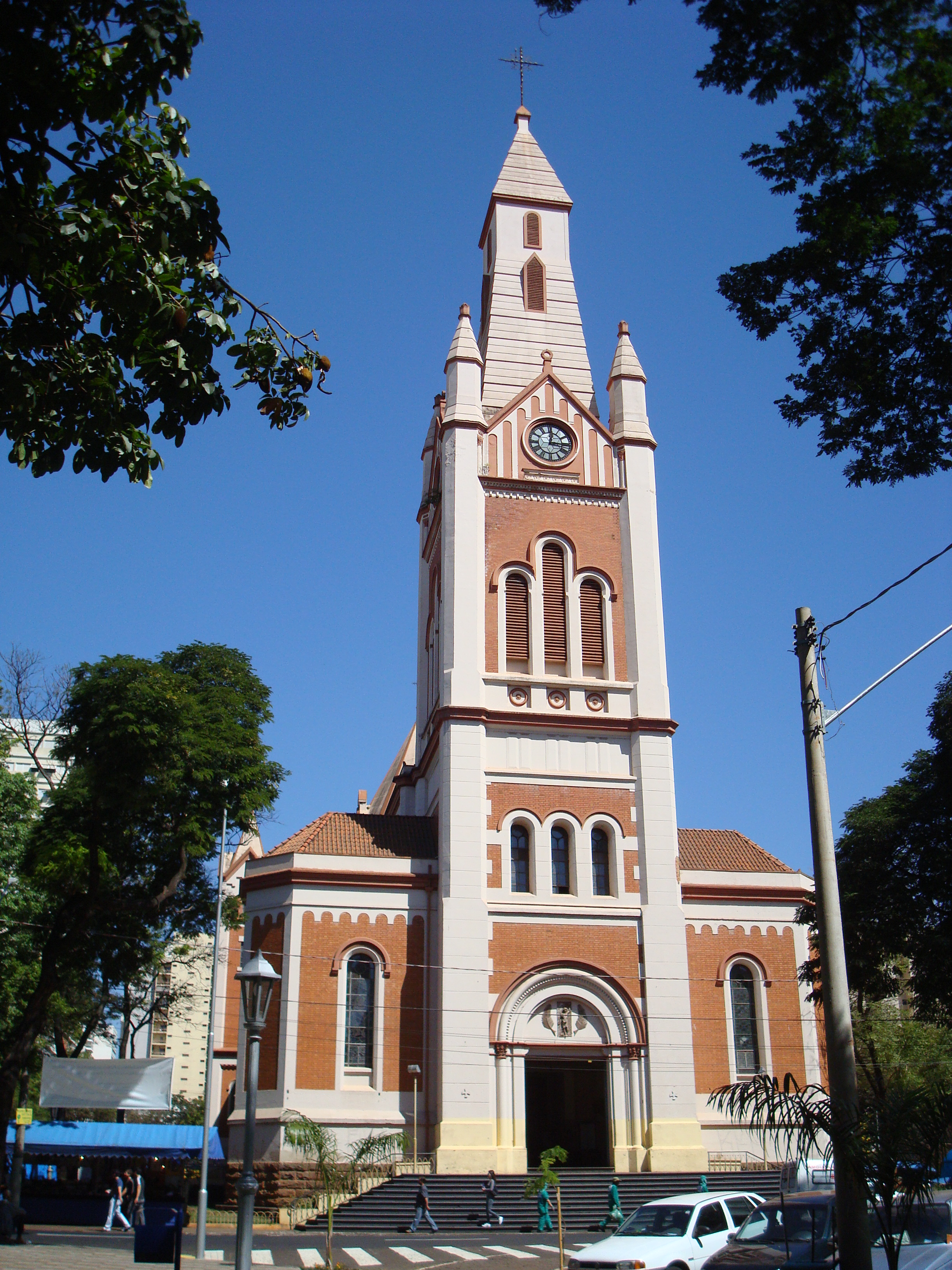
- Metropolitan Cathedral of St. Sebastian

- Coat of arms

Location
- Country: Brazil

Statistics
- Area: 8,897 km^{2} (3,435 sq mi)
- Population: Total; Catholics: (as of 2004); 927,625; 742,100 (80.0%)

Information
- Rite: Latin Rite
- Established: 7 June 1908 (118 years ago)
- Cathedral: Catedral Metropolitana São Sebastião

Current leadership
- Pope: Leo XIV
- Archbishop: Moacir Silva

Map
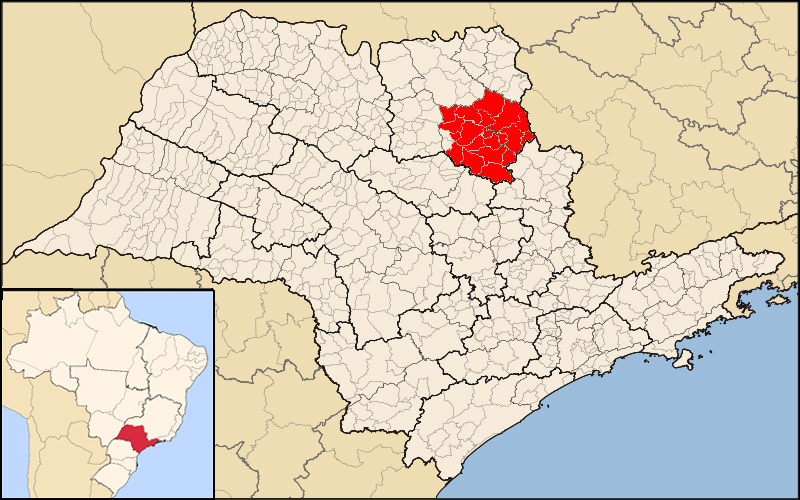

Website
- www.arquidioceserp.org.br

The Roman Catholic Archdiocese of Ribeirão Preto (Latin: Archidioecesis Rivi Nigri) is an archdiocese located in the city of Ribeirão Preto in Brazil.

Bishop Moacir Silva, until then serving as the Bishop of the Roman Catholic Diocese of São José dos Campos, was named to serve as the next Metropolitan Archbishop-elect of the Roman Catholic Archdiocese of Ribeirão Preto by Pope Francis on Wednesday, April 24, 2013. He is the tenth ordinary and eighth Archbishop, and succeeds Archbishop Joviano de Lima Júnior, S.S.S., a Pope Benedict appointee who had died in office in June 2012. Silva was born on July 16, 1954, in São José dos Campos, Brazil, in Sao Paulo State, the see city of the Roman Catholic Diocese of São José dos Campos which he eventually headed. He completed preparatory studies at the Minor Seminary of Taubate, Brazil, and then completed his undergraduate philosophy studies at the Bom Jesus Seminary of the Roman Catholic Archdiocese of Aparecida in Aparecida, Brazil. Archbishop-elect Silva then completed his graduate studies in theology at the Theological Institute Sagrado Coração de Jesus of Taubate. He is trained in Canon Law (the laws of the Catholic Church), having obtained the Licentiate of Canon Law (J.C.L.) from the Pontifical Faculty of Theology Nossa Senhora da Assunção in the Roman Catholic Archdiocese of Sao Paulo in Sao Paulo, Brazil, and having also graduated from the Pontifical Lateran University in Rome, Italy.

He was ordained a priest on December 6, 1986, and was incardinated in the Roman Catholic Diocese of São José dos Campos. He then held the following positions: Diocesan Youth Pastoral Coordinator (1983–1986); Diocesan Coordinator of Pastoral Care in Health (1986); Parochial Vicar (Associate Pastor, or Curate) of the Diocesan Cathedral Parish (1986–1988); Parish Pastor, Coração de Jesus Parish Church (1988–1993); a Member of the Diocesan Presbyteral Council and College of Consultors (1991–2003); Diocesan Coordinator of Pastoral Care of the Family (1993–1999); Parish Administrator of the Diocesan Cathedral Parish (1992–1993); Vicar General of the Diocese (1993–2003); Director of the School for the Diaconal Training Program (1992–2004); Judge of the Interdiocesan Tribunal at the Roman Catholic Archdiocese of Aparecida in Aparecida (since 1993); Parish Pastor of the Diocesan Cathedral Parish São Dimas (1993–2004); Diocesan Administrator (2003–2004).

On October 20, 2004, he was appointed Bishop of the Roman Catholic Diocese of São José dos Campos by Pope John Paul II in the last months of his pontificate. He received episcopal ordination on December 11, 2004.

From 2008, he has served as a member of the Brazilian National Episcopal Commission for Ecclesiastical Courts of Second Instance (of Appeal), and in 2011 he became Vice Chairman of the Regional Bishops' Conference of the State of Sao Paulo.

== History ==
- 7 June 1908: Established as Diocese of Ribeirão Preto from the Diocese of São Paulo
- 19 April 1958: Promoted as Metropolitan Archdiocese of Ribeirão Preto

== Bishops ==
- Bishops of Ribeirão Preto (Roman Rite)
  - Bishop Alberto José Gonçalves (1908.12.05 – 1945.03.06)
  - Bishop Manoel da Silveira d’Elboux (1946.02.22 – 1950.08.19), appointed Archbishop of Curitiba, Parana
  - Bishop Luis do Amaral Mousinho (1952.03.18 – 1958.04.19 see below)
- Archbishops of Ribeirão Preto (Roman rite)
  - Archbishop Luis do Amaral Mousinho (see above 1958.04.19 – 1962.04.24)
  - Archbishop Agnelo Rossi (1962.09.06 – 1964.11.01), appointed Archbishop of São Paulo (Cardinal in 1965)
  - Archbishop Felix César da Cunha Vasconcellos, O.F.M. (1965.03.25 – 1972.07.12)
  - Archbishop Bernardo José Bueno Miele (1972.07.12 – 1981.12.22)
  - Archbishop Romeu Alberti (1982.06.03 – 1988.08.06)
  - Archbishop Arnaldo Ribeiro (1988.12.28 – 2006.04.05)
  - Archbishop Joviano de Lima Júnior, S.S.S. (2006.04.05 – 2012.06.21)
  - Archbishop Moacir Silva (2013.04.24 - present); formerly, Bishop of the Roman Catholic Diocese of São José dos Campos

=== Coadjutor Archbishop ===
- Bernardo José Bueno Miele (1967–1972)

=== Auxiliary Bishop ===
- Manuel da Silveira d’Elboux (1940–1946), appointed Bishop here

=== Other priests of this diocese who became bishops ===
- João Bergese, appointed Bishop of Guarulhos, Sao Paulo in 1981
- Diógenes da Silva Matthes, appointed Bishop of Franca, Sao Paulo in 1971
- Ilson de Jesus Montanari, appointed titular archbishop and Secretary of the Congregation for Bishops in 2013

== Suffragan dioceses ==
- Diocese of Franca
- Diocese of Jaboticabal
- Diocese of São João da Boa Vista

== Sources ==
- GCatholic.org
- Catholic Hierarchy
- Archdiocese website (Portuguese)
