= Amanda Teixeira Dias =

Brazilian politician (born 1995)

Member of the Legislative Assembly of Minas Gerais
- Incumbent
- Assumed office 11 June 2024
- Preceded by: Alê Portela

Personal details
- Born: 5 December 1995 (age 30)
- Party: Liberal Party
- Parent: Marcelo Álvaro Antônio (father)

Amanda Caroline Teixeira Dias (born 5 December 1995) is a Brazilian politician serving as a member of the Legislative Assembly of Minas Gerais since 2024. She is the daughter of Marcelo Álvaro Antônio.
