= Daniela Carneiro =

Brazilian politician

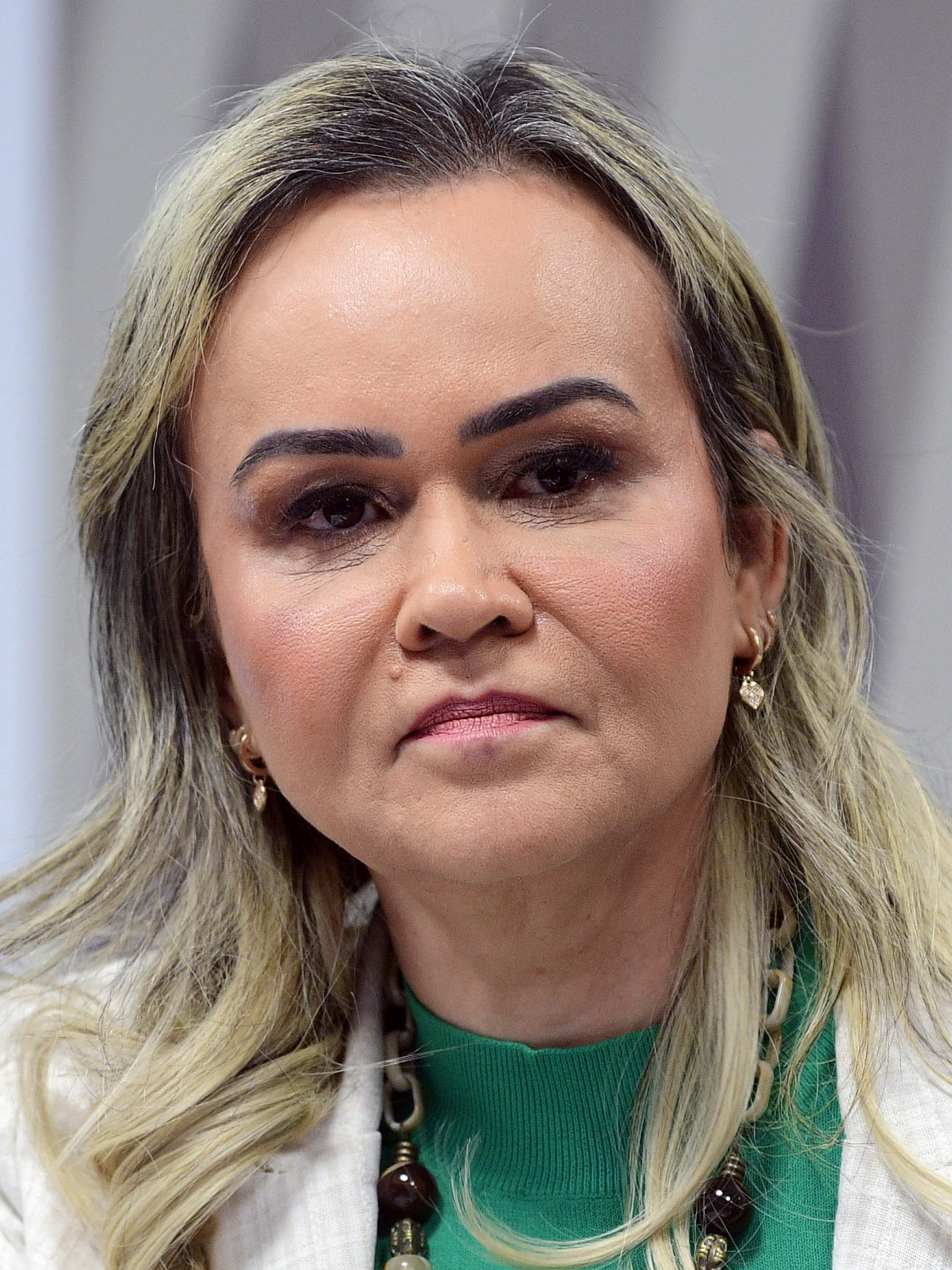
- Carneiro in 2023

Member of the Chamber of Deputies
- Incumbent
- Assumed office 1 February 2019
- Constituency: Rio de Janeiro

Minister of Tourism
- In office 1 January 2023 – 13 July 2023
- President: Luiz Inácio Lula da Silva
- Preceded by: Carlos Brito
- Succeeded by: Celso Sabino

Personal details
- Born: Daniela Moté Souza Carneiro; 10 February 1976 (age 50) Italva, Rio de Janeiro, Brazil
- Party: REP (2026–present)
- Other political affiliations: PSC (2003–2011); PRTB (2011–2013); PR (2013–2018); MDB (2018–2022); UNIÃO (2022–2026)
- Spouse: Wagner dos Santos Carneiro (m. 1999)
- Profession: Pedagogue

Daniela Moté de Souza Carneiro (born 10 February 1976 in Italva), also known as Daniela do Waguinho, is a Brazilian pedagogue and politician affiliated to Republicans. She is currently a congresswoman and former Minister of Tourism.

== Political career ==
In 2003, she worked at the Municipal Secretariat of Education of Rio de Janeiro. After that, Carneiro worked at the Municipal Secretariat of Social Assistance and Citizenship of the same city.

Between February 2017 and March 2018, Daniela had served as Municipal Secretary of Social Assistance and Citizenship of Belford Roxo during the first term of her husband, Wagner dos Santos Carneiro.

=== Chamber of Deputies (2019–2022) ===
In the 2018 Rio de Janeiro state election, Daniela was elected for the Chamber representing the state and becoming the most voted candidate of her party of the state, the Brazilian Democratic Movement (MDB), and the most voted candidate for the Chamber in Belford Roxo, with 136,286 votes. In the 2022 state elections, Daniela was re-elected as the most voted candidate, with a total of 213,706 votes.

=== Ministry of Tourism ===
In December 2022, Daniela was announced as Minister of Tourism of the third Lula administration, assuming office on 1 January 2023. She resigned from office on 6 July 2023, but her departure from the Ministry of Tourism was postponed until 13 July 2023, when she was replaced by Celso Sabino.

== Electoral history ==
Year	Election	Office	Party	Coalition	Votes	%	Result
2018	Rio de Janeiro State	Federal Congresswoman	MDB	Rio Wants Peace (DEM, MDB, PP, PTB)	136,286	1.93	Elected
2022	Rio de Janeiro State	Federal Congresswoman	UNIÃO	—N/a	213,706	2.47	Elected

== Personal life ==
Daniela is married to the former mayor of Belford Roxo, Wagner dos Santos Carneiro, known as Waguinho, and is mother of two sons: Nathan and Callebe.

She is also graduate in Pedagogy with specialization in Educational Orientation and is also post-graduate in Psychomotricity.

Political offices
Preceded by Carlos Brito	Minister of Tourism; 2023	Succeeded by Celso Sabino
