= Ilson de Jesus Montanari =

Brazilian Catholic bishop (born 1959)

The Most Reverend Ilson de Jesus Montanari
- Secretary of the Congregation for Bishops
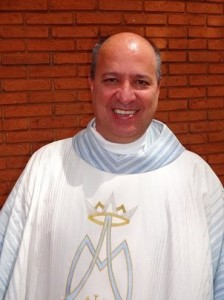
- Montanari in 2014
- Church: Roman Catholic Church
- Appointed: 12 October 2013
- Predecessor: Lorenzo Baldisseri
- Other posts: Titular Archbishop of Caput Cilla (2013–present); Secretary of the College of Cardinals (2014–present); Vice Camerlengo of the Holy Roman Church (2020–present)

Orders
- Ordination: 18 August 1989 by Arnaldo Ribeiro
- Consecration: 7 November 2013 by Moacir Silva

Personal details
- Born: Ilson de Jesus Montanari; 18 July 1959 (age 67) Sertãozinho, Brazil
- Education: University of Ribeirão Preto; Pontifical Gregorian University; Pontifício Colégio Pio Brasileiro

Ilson de Jesus Montanari (born 18 July 1959) is a Brazilian prelate of the Catholic Church who has been secretary of the Congregation for Bishops since 12 October 2013 and Vice Camerlengo of the Holy Roman Church since 1 May 2020.

== Biography ==
Montanari was born in Sertãozinho, São Paulo state inside the territory of the archdiocese of Ribeirão Preto. He attended elementary school from 1965 to 1969 in Sertãozinho. He went on to study law and economics at the University of Ribeirão Preto. Montanari obtained a BA in Philosophy from the Centre for Studies of the archdiocese of Ribeirão Preto.

He studied at the diocesan seminary from 1982 to 1985. He was sent to Rome where he obtained a bachelor's degree in theology from the Pontifical Gregorian University from 1985 to 1988. While in Rome, he lived at the Pontifício Colégio Pio Brasileiro. He was ordained a priest for the Roman Catholic Archdiocese of Ribeirão Preto on 18 August 1989.

After his ordination he was appointed pastor and a year later was professor of theology in Ribeirão Preto and at the same time the seminary of Uberaba until 1994. From 1990 until 2001 he was a member of the priests council and the diocesan college of consultors. He held the posts of chancellor and pastoral co-ordinator from 1993 until 2002.

He returned to Rome in 2002 to study at the Pontifical Gregorian University, where he obtained his license in dogmatic theology in 2004. From 2008 to 2013 he served as an official at the Congregation for Bishops. He was appointed Chaplain of His Holiness (styled monsignor) on 13 May 2011.

On 12 October 2013 Montanari was appointed Titular Archbishop of Capocilla and secretary of the Congregation for Bishops. He was consecrated on 7 November 2013 in Brazil by Archbishop Moacir Silva. On 28 January 2014 he replaced Lorenzo Baldisseri as secretary of the College of Cardinals.

On 1 May 2020, Pope Francis named him Vice Camerlengo of the Holy Roman Church.

Catholic Church titles
Preceded by Lorenzo Baldisseri	Secretary of the Congregation for Bishops; 12 October 2013 – present	Incumbent
Preceded by Lorenzo Baldisseri	Secretary of the College of Cardinals; 28 January 2014 – present	Incumbent
Preceded by Giampiero Gloder	Vice Camerlengo of the Holy Roman Church; 1 May 2020 – present	Incumbent
