= Dennis Dauttmam =

Brazilian politician (1964–2025)

Adenildo Braulino dos Santos
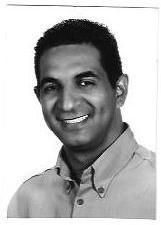
- Dennis in 2012

Mayor of Belford Roxo
- In office January 1, 2013 – December 31, 2016
- Preceded by: Alcides Rolim
- Succeeded by: Waguniho

City Councillor of Belford Roxo
- In office January 1, 2005 – December 31, 2008

City Councillor of Belford Roxo
- In office January 1, 2009 – December 31, 2012

Personal details
- Born: May 23, 1964 Ibicaraí, Bahia, Brazil
- Died: June 5, 2025 (aged 61) Duque de Caxias, Rio de Janeiro, Brazil
- Party: PCdoB (2012–2025)
- Other political affiliations: PRONA (2004–2006); PTB (2006–2008); PR (2008–2012)
- Profession: Fashion designer
- Nickname: Dennis Dauttmam

Adenildo Braulino dos Santos (May 23, 1964 – June 5, 2025), better known as Dennis Dauttmam, was a Brazilian fashion designer and politician. He served as mayor and councilor of Belford Roxo, in the Baixada Fluminense.

== Early life and career ==
Dauttmam was born on May 23, 1964 in Ibicaraí, Bahia. Affiliated with the Party of the Reconstruction of the National Order (PRONA), he was a candidate for the position of councilor in the city of Belford Roxo. In 2006, he left PRONA and moved to the Brazilian Labor Party (PTB), where he ran for the position of state deputy of Rio de Janeiro, in the same year.

In 2012, he joined the Communist Party of Brazil (PCdoB), to run for the position of mayor in Belford Roxo. In the second round, he won with 61% of the votes, his opponent, Waguinho (PRTB), becoming the first mayor of the PCdoB to be elected in the Baixada Fluminense.

His administration was marked by investments in the area of sports and the delivery of housing units by the Minha Casa, Minha Vida (PMCMV) program, with a subsidy from the federal government. He was prosecuted twice by the Federal Public Ministry (MPF) of the state of Rio de Janeiro, for lack of public transparency and the second time for impropriety with guardianship councils.

In 2016, he announced that he would not run for reelection. Among the factors, he pointed out the economic crisis experienced by the country and that "he needed greater focus for the municipality until the end of his term" and that "an election would hinder the work". The PCdoB declared neutrality in the 2016 dispute. The election was won by Waguinho (PMDB), whom Dauttmam had defeated in the previous election. Dauttmam's 2016 accounts were rejected by the Court of Auditors of the State of Rio de Janeiro (TCE-RJ). In 2018, he suffered a search and seizure warrant in a joint investigation by the Public Prosecutor's Office and the Civil Police of the State of Rio de Janeiro (PCERJ).

== Death ==
Dauttmam died on June 5, 2025, after being hospitalized for five days with very serious pneumonia at the Adão Pereira Nunes Hospital, in Duque de Caxias. He suffered a cardiorespiratory arrest after not showing any improvement in his clinical condition.

Following his death, the mayor of Belford Roxo, Márcio Canella (UNIÃO), declared three days of official mourning in the city.
