= Antônio Roberto Cavuto =

Brazilian Roman Catholic bishop (1944–2026)

The Most Reverend Antônio Roberto Cavuto O.F.M. Cap.
- Bishop Emeritus of Itapipoca
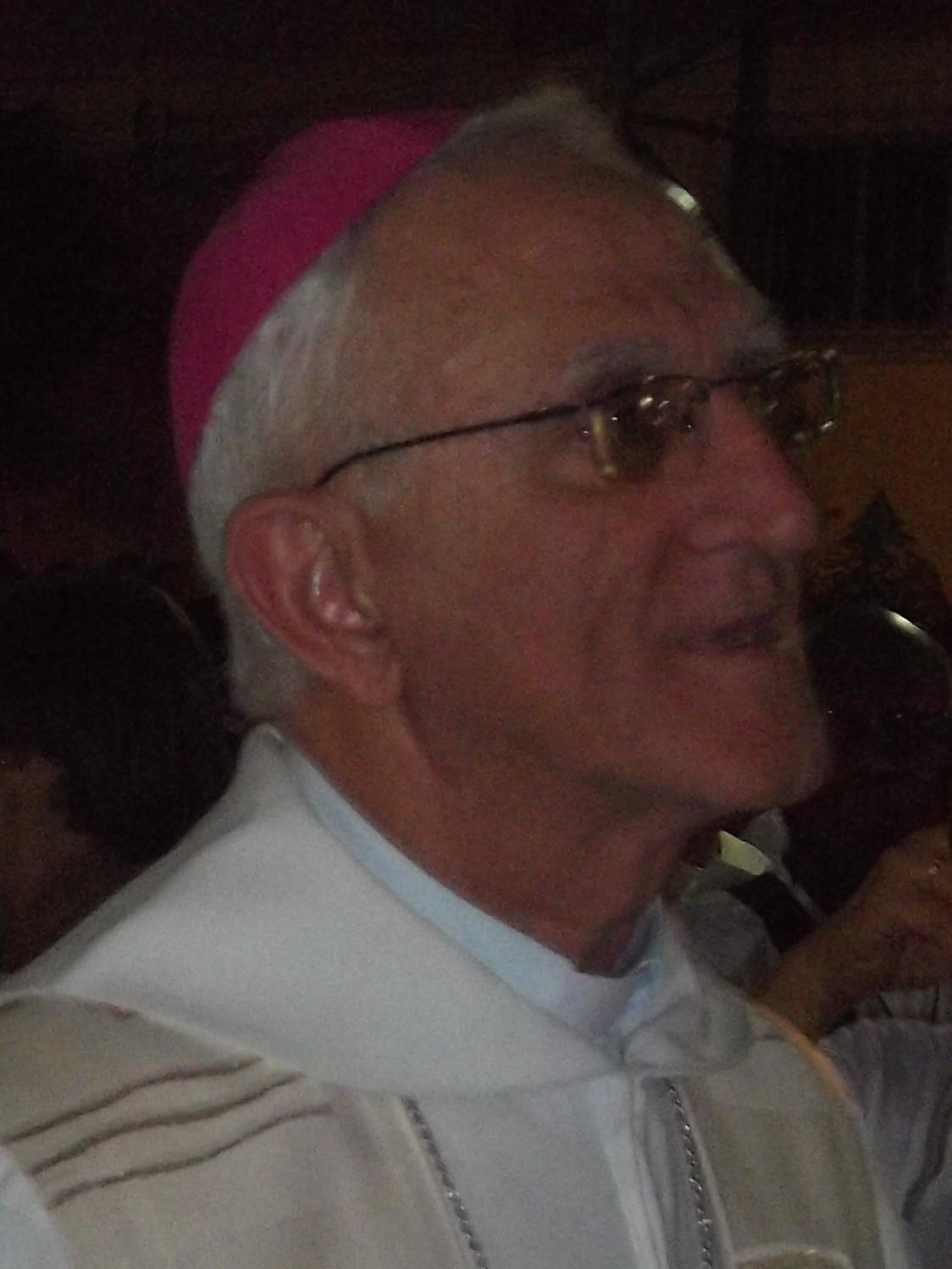
- Church: Catholic Church
- Diocese: Itapipoca
- Appointed: 25 May 2005
- Installed: 31 July 2005
- Term ended: 7 October 2020
- Predecessor: Benedito Francisco de Albuquerque
- Successor: Rosalvo Cordeiro de Lima

Orders
- Ordination: 24 January 1971
- Consecration: 2 July 2005 by Serafim Fernandes de Araújo, Benedito Francisco de Albuquerque and José Alberto Moura

Personal details
- Born: 19 May 1944 Espírito Santo do Pinhal, São Paulo, Brazil
- Died: 1 October 2026 (aged 82) Belo Horizonte, Minas Gerais, Brazil
- Education: Federal University of Minas Gerais
- Motto: Queremos ver Jesus

Antônio Roberto Cavuto O.F.M. Cap. (19 May 1944 – 1 October 2026) was a Brazilian Roman Catholic prelate who served as the bishop of Itapipoca from 2005 to 2020.

== Early life ==
Cavuto was born in Espírito Santo do Pinhal, in the state of São Paulo, on 19 May 1944. He entered the Capuchin minor seminary in Ouro Fino, Minas Gerais, in 1959 and began his novitiate in 1961. He made his first religious profession in 1962 and his perpetual profession in 1965. He studied philosophy at the Capuchin seminary in Itambacuri and theology at the Central Institute of Philosophy and Theology in Belo Horizonte. He subsequently obtained a degree in philosophy from the Federal University of Minas Gerais.

He was ordained a priest on 24 January 1971 in his hometown. During his priestly ministry he served in a number of Capuchin communities in Minas Gerais, including Uberaba, Poços de Caldas, Belo Horizonte, Patos de Minas and Uberlândia. His responsibilities included parish priest, rector, novice master, guardian and director of students. In 1977 he became vice-provincial of the Capuchins of Minas Gerais, and in 1980 he became the first provincial minister of the newly established Province of the Capuchins of Minas Gerais. He was re-elected to the latter position in 1983.

== Episcopate ==
On 25 May 2005, Pope Benedict XVI appointed Cavuto bishop of Itapipoca, succeeding Benedito Francisco de Albuquerque. At the time of his appointment he was parish priest and guardian of the São Sebastião Fraternity in the Diocese of Uberlândia. He was consecrated a bishop on 2 July 2005 at the Church of Nossa Senhora do Rosário de Pompéia in Belo Horizonte, with Cardinal Serafim Fernandes de Araújo as principal consecrator and bishops Benedito Francisco de Albuquerque and José Alberto Moura as co-consecrators. He was installed as bishop of Itapipoca on 31 July 2005.

His episcopal motto was Queremos ver Jesus ("We want to see Jesus"). During his 15 years as bishop, Cavuto participated in several bodies of the National Conference of Bishops of Brazil (CNBB), Regional Nordeste I, including commissions concerned with the semi-arid region, ordained ministry and consecrated life, and social action. He also served as secretary-general of the regional conference.

According to contemporary reports, during his episcopate in Itapipoca he ordained 14 diocesan priests, five religious priests and 11 permanent deacons. He also oversaw the elevation of eight pastoral areas to parish status, the creation of religious houses and the development of the Dom Paulo Ponte Major Seminary in Fortaleza.

== Retirement ==
On 7 October 2020, Pope Francis accepted Cavuto's resignation from the pastoral government of the Diocese of Itapipoca after he reached the customary retirement age for diocesan bishops. He was succeeded by Rosalvo Cordeiro de Lima, then auxiliary bishop of Fortaleza.

After his retirement, Cavuto initially resided in Fortaleza. In 2024 he returned to the Province of the Capuchin Friars Minor of Minas Gerais and resided at the Convent of Nossa Senhora do Rosário de Pompéia in Belo Horizonte, where the provincial curia and infirmary are located.

== Death ==
Cavuto died in Brazil on 1 October 2026, at the age of 82. His death was reported by the Diocese of Itapipoca and the Capuchin Province of Minas Gerais. L'Osservatore Romano also reported his death the following day, identifying him as bishop emeritus of Itapipoca.

Brazilian newspaper O Povo reported that Cavuto had been hospitalized in Minas Gerais since 10 August and died following complications during his hospitalization.
