= Waguinho (politician) =

Brazilian politician

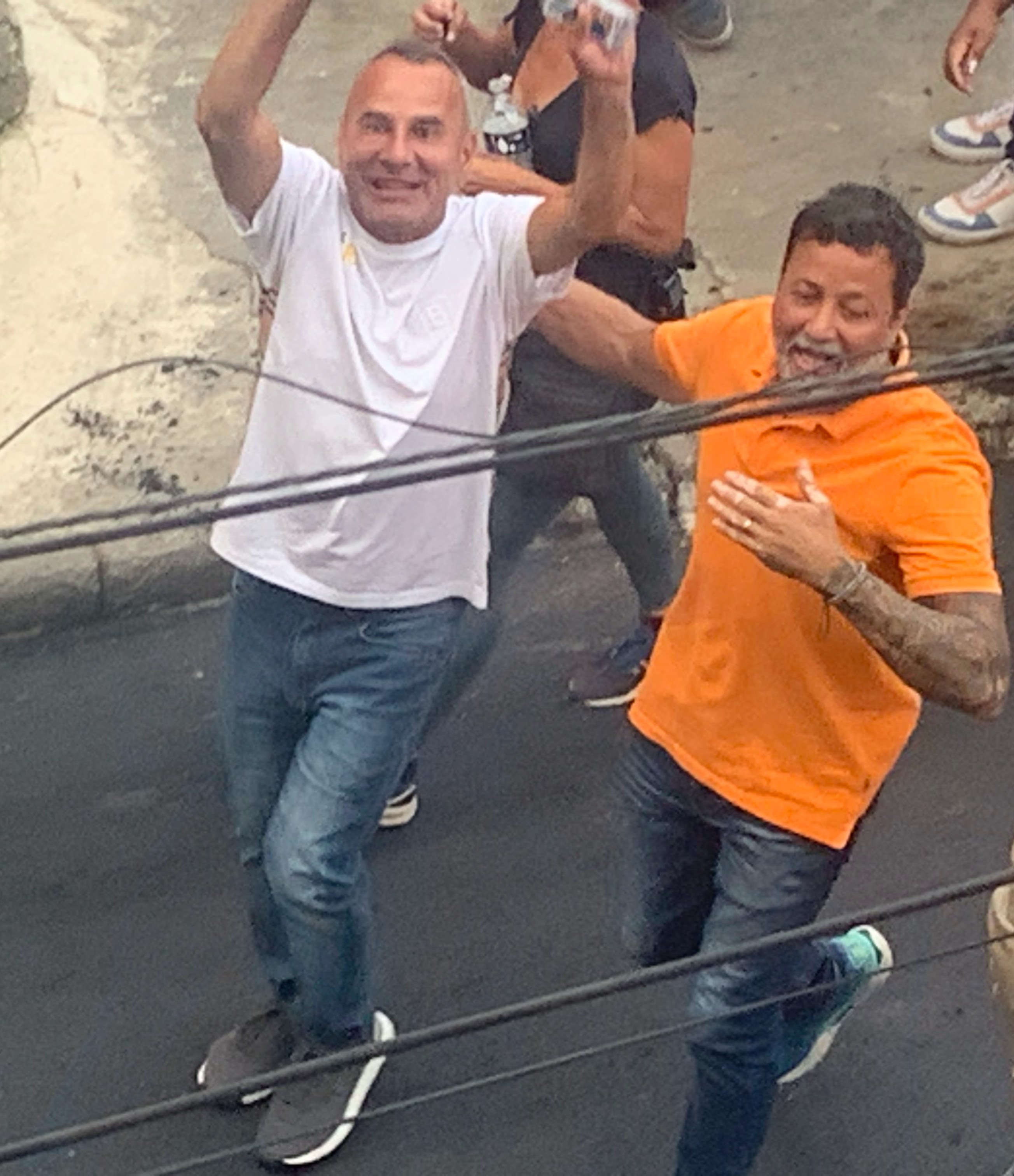
- Waguinho (left) walking in Parque Colônial in Belford Roxo

Mayor of Belford Roxo
- In office 1 January 2017 – 31 December 2024
- Vice Mayor: Márcio Canella (2017–2019); Vacant (2019–2021); Marcello Canella (2021–2024)
- Preceded by: Dennis Dauttmam
- Succeeded by: Márcio Canella

State Deputy of Rio de Janeiro
- In office 1 February 2011 – 1 January 2017

Councilman of Belford Roxo
- In office 1 February 2009 – 1 February 2011

Personal details
- Born: Wagner dos Santos Carneiro; 29 October 1971 (age 54) Belford Roxo, Rio de Janeiro, Brazil
- Party: REPUBLICANOS (2023–present)
- Other political affiliations: PSDB (2003–2007); PRTB (2007–2013); MDB (2013–2021); PSL (2021–2022); UNIÃO (2022–2023)
- Spouse: Daniela Carneiro
- Children: 2
- Education: UniverCidade

Wagner dos Santos Carneiro, better known as Waguinho (born 29 October 1971) is a Brazilian politician affiliated with the Republicans. Having graduated with a law degree from UniverCidade, he was a state deputy in the state of Rio de Janeiro and later became the mayor of the city of Belford Roxo from 2017 to 2024.

== Biography and personal life ==
Waguinho is the son of Ângela dos Santos Carneiro and Hamilton Francisco Carneiro. He studied at the Escola Municipal Heliópolis and at the Colégio Estadual Gustavo Barroso. He took courses at the integrated secondary school at Colégio Estadual Presidente Kennedy with technical courses in accounting. At 16 years old, he asked his father if he could renovate machines at Colégio Estadual Presidente Kennedy without paying for the service, a time in which him being a student would benefit him for the better.

He published a self-promotion book, De faxineiro a presidente, minha luta por Belford Roxo, telling his story of political ascension coming from poverty. During a cultural promotion fair in the Baixada Fluminense region, which was held in Belford Roxo, a journalist points out that "with the city's culture there is not just one line in the book".

Waguinho is married to Daniela Carneiro, his first and only girlfriend, in 1999, with whom they have two children, Nathan and Calebe.

== Political career ==
=== Beginnings ===
Waguinho began to work in the Chamber of Councilors of Belford Roxo as a washer. He was approved by a contest and was designated as an advisor to the president of the chamber. In 2008, he was elected as a councilman with the Brazilian Labour Renewal Party with 5,413 votes, becoming the most voted for candidate in the city's history up to that point. Soon after he began his term, he was elected President of the Municipal Council.

He ran to become a state deputy in the state of Rio de Janeiro in 2010, being elected with 34,820 votes. He was reelected in 2014 with 53,835 votes as a member of the Brazilian Democratic Movement (PMDB). He would go on to become the president of the Permanent Commission on Mines and Energy in the Legislative Assembly of Rio de Janeiro, as well as the parliamentary vice-leader of the PMDB.

=== Mayoral campaigns in Belford Roxo ===
Waguinho became a candidate for mayor of Belford Roxo for the first time in 2012, and advanced to the second round, but was defeated by Dennis Dauttmam (PCdoB).

In the 2016 elections, he ran again as was elected after Dauttmam declined to run for reelection. In the first round, he obtained 49.46% of the vote (102,777 votes), and was elected mayor in the second round with 56.99% of the vote (117,352). Waguinho would go on to proclaim victory while still in the first round, but on 10 October 2016, the regional election court of the state of Rio de Janeiro determined a second round was to be held after deferring to resources made by one of his opponents in the election, fellow state deputy Doutor Deodalto (DEM).

=== Mayor of Belford Roxo (2017–2024) ===
==== 2017 ====
Upon assuming the mayoralty, Waguinho dismissed more than two thousand municipal workers in an attempt to lower spending. The press highlighted that while this was happening, those such as his wife and the employees under her post were kept. The mayor decided to pay the late paychecks in installments in order to guarantee them being paid.

In November 2017, the Public Ministry of Rio de Janeiro filed a complain against Waguinho for nepotism: the first lady, Daniela Carneiro, was nominated to be the Secretary of Assistance and Citizenry, while his sister, Fabiane dos Santos Carneiro, was nominated to be the Secretary for the Protection of Animals.

==== 2018 ====
In March 2018, Waguinho and his vice-mayoral pick had their electoral certificates withheld for accusations of having slush funds. During the 2018 elections, Waguinho was arrested for illegally campaigned on election day; the mayor fled the locality and was not jailed, since he had not been issued any prison term.

==== 2020 ====
Waguinho allied with the Workers' Party (PT) during the 2020 elections. Various smaller people within the PT were against the alliance, especially preoccupied with potentially affecting the chances of electing Benedita da Silva to be mayor of neighboring Rio de Janeiro. In the end, the decision to ally with Waguinho was ultimately approved by the PT in August, with 29 votes for to 25 against (with 11 abstentions). Washington Quaquá, the main supporter of the move, responded to internal criticisms by saying that "Brazilian politics are absolutely contradictory. The base of society is pure contradiction...This gang [from the PT] that is against [this] loves to theorize the [people of the] Baixada drinking beers in Ipanema".

During the election, Waguinho became the first mayor reelected in the history of Belford Roxo, taking 80.40 percent of the vote (162,720 votes), being the most voted for mayor in the entire Rio de Janeiro metropolitan region that year.

==== 2023 ====
On 29 October 2023, Clayton Damaceno, an ally of Waguinho who had been a pre-candidate for councilman, was assassinated in Queimados. According to Metrópoles, Waguinho had been warning the Lula administration that he had been fearing for his life and had requested protection.

In December, Waguinho entered unannounced to a session of the Chamber of Councilors in which there would have been opposition councillors being elected to the board of directors. During the showdown, Waguinho slapped a man in the chamber.

The Supreme Federal Court, through an injunction by justice André Mendonça, suspended the session and ordered a new election. In a note by his advisor to G1, Waguinho said that he had gone to the chamber to "take stock how the exercise was in 2023 and show the advances made in the municipality" when he was surprised by the attacks and injuries: "Without an alternative, the mayor reacted to the unjust aggression while objects were being thrown in his direction. Waguinho maintains that he had not assaulted anyone in the chamber."

==== 2024 ====
Due to being his second consecutive mandate, he could not run in the 2024 elections, but supported his nephew, Matheus Carneiro, as his successor.

On 23 May 2024, the Public Ministry of Rio de Janeiro (MP-RJ) filed a complaint against Waguinho and 5 other people for fraud during a bidding to buy items to combat dengue fever outbreaks.

On 9 July, Denis de Souza Macedo, the municipal secretary of Education of Belford Roxo, was jailed during Operation Fames, triggered by the Federal Police and by the Federal Public Ministry for supposed embezzlement from the municipal school lunch fund. The Federal Police apprehended 2.6 million Brazilian real from the houses of the targets of the investigation. Hours before becoming targets of the investigation, during an event hosted in the Xavantes neighborhood, Waguinho referred to Macedo as the "greatest education secretary of all time". He was then applauded by the audience.

On 5 November, the Municipal Chamber of Councilors started impeachment proceedings against Waguinho.

On 26 November, the Chamber of Councilors rejected Waguinho's accounts and he became ineligible to run for public office for 8 years. The chamber, on 10 December, also requested for his ineligibility based on accusations that he had used public institutions to favor his nephew's campaign for mayor.

On 31 December 2024, with a delay in the payment of salaries, benefits, and the 13th salary for municipal workers in health and education, Waguinho's car was egged. The protestors also invaded Belford Roxo's municipal building.

=== Post-mayoralty (2025-present) ===
On 2 January 2025, Márcio Canella, the recently elected mayor of Belford Roxo, accused Waguinho of having stripped the executive's headquarters of possessions. Canella made a decree of the municipality having a financial calamity and determined that the municipality must be closed for 15 days in order to refurnish it. An inventory will be made with the goal of filing a police report against Waguinho. Canella affirmed that the former mayor took "even the faucets in the bathroom", showers, batteries in the remote controls for air conditioning, computers, and hard drives. Along with this, the debts in the city coffers had reached $1.5 billion real. The same day, the second edition of RJTV on Globo showed images of destruction and signs of abandonment in different buildings owned by the municipal government.
