= Carlos Brito (Brazilian politician) =

Brazilian politician

Minister of Tourism
- In office 31 March 2022 – 31 December 2022
- President: Jair Bolsonaro
- Preceded by: Gilson Machado Neto
- Succeeded by: Daniela Carneiro

Personal details
- Born: 1982 or 1983 (age 43–44)
- Party: Independent

Carlos Alberto Gomes de Brito (born 1982 or 1983) is a Brazilian politician. From March to December 2022, he served as minister of tourism. From 2020 to 2022, he served as president of Embratur.
