= Portela =

Portela or Pórtela may refer to:

== People ==
- Portela (surname)

== Places ==
- Lisbon Portela Airport, the international airport of Lisbon, Portugal
- Residence of Portela, 17th-century country house in Paços de Brandão, Portugal

=== Civil parishes ===
- Portela (Amares), a civil parish in the municipality of Amares, Portugal
- Portela (Arcos de Valdevez), a civil parish in the municipality of Arcos de Valdevez, Portugal
- Portela (Loures), a civil parish in the municipality of Loures (also known as Portela de Sacavém), Portugal
- Portela (Monção), a civil parish in the municipality of Monção, Portugal
- Portela (Penafiel), a civil parish in the municipality of Penafiel, Portugal
- Portela (Vila Nova de Famalicão), a civil parish in the municipality of Vila Nova de Famalicão, Portugal
- Portela Susã (Viana do Castelo), a civil parish in the municipality of Viana do Castelo, Portugal

== Other uses ==
- Portela (samba school), a samba school in Brazil
- A brand name of the veterinary medication relfovetmab
