= Diocese of Mogi das Cruzes =

Catholic ecclesiastical territory

Diocese of Mogi das Cruzes Dioecesis Crucismogiensis

Catholic
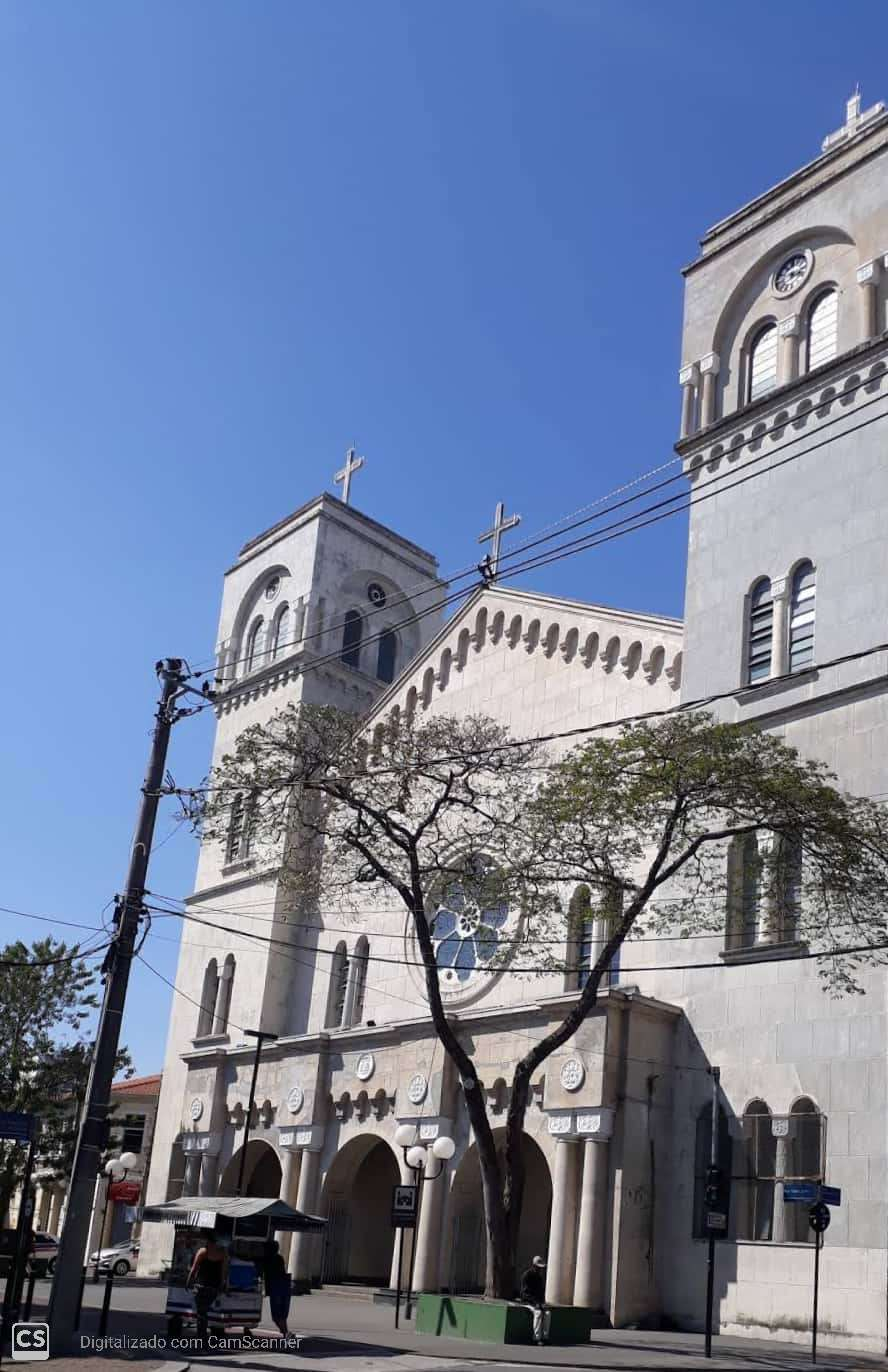
- Cathedral of St. Ann

Location
- Country: Brazil
- Ecclesiastical province: São Paulo

Statistics
- Area: 2,552 km^{2} (985 sq mi)
- Population: Total; Catholics: (as of 2004); 1,233,890; 596,565 (48.3%)

Information
- Rite: Latin Rite
- Established: 9 June 1962 (64 years ago)
- Cathedral: Catedral Sant’Ana

Current leadership
- Pope: Leo XIV
- Bishop: Pedro Luiz Stinghini
- Metropolitan Archbishop: Odilo Scherer

Map
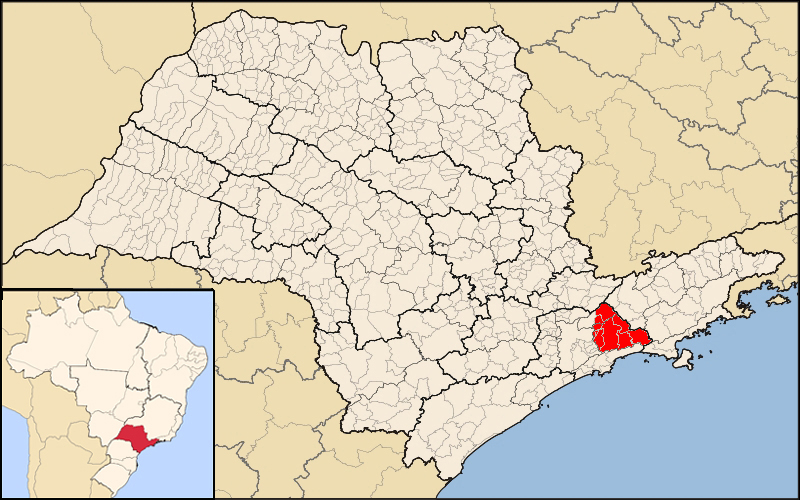

Website
- www.diocesedemogi.org.br

The Roman Catholic Diocese of Mogi das Cruzes (Latin: Dioecesis Crucismogiensis) is a diocese located in the city of Mogi das Cruzes in the ecclesiastical province of São Paulo in Brazil.

== History ==
- 9 June 1962: Established as Diocese of Mogi das Cruzes from the Metropolitan Archdiocese of São Paulo and Diocese of Taubaté.
- It lost territory on 30 January 1981 to establish the Diocese of Guarulhos.

== Bishops ==
- Bishops of Mogi das Cruzes (Roman rite), in reverse chronological order
  - Bishop Pedro Luiz Stinghini (19 September 2012–present)
  - Bishop Airton José dos Santos (4 August 2004 – 15 April 2012), appointed Archbishop of Campinas, São Paulo
  - Bishop Paulo Antonino Mascarenhas Roxo, O. Praem. (18 November 1989 – 4 August 2004)
  - Bishop Emílio Pignoli (29 April 1976 – 15 March 1989), appointed Bishop of Campo Limpo, São Paulo
  - Bishop Paulo Rolim Loureiro (4 August 1962 – 2 August 1975)

=== Other priests of this diocese who became bishops ===
- Rosalvo Cordeiro de Lima, appointed Auxiliary Bishop of Fortaleza, Ceara in 2011
- Carlos José de Oliveira (priest here, 1992-1996), appointed Bishop of Apucarana, Parana in 2018
