= Ministry of Tourism (Brazil) =

Federal ministry of Brazil

- Portuguese: Ministério do Turismo
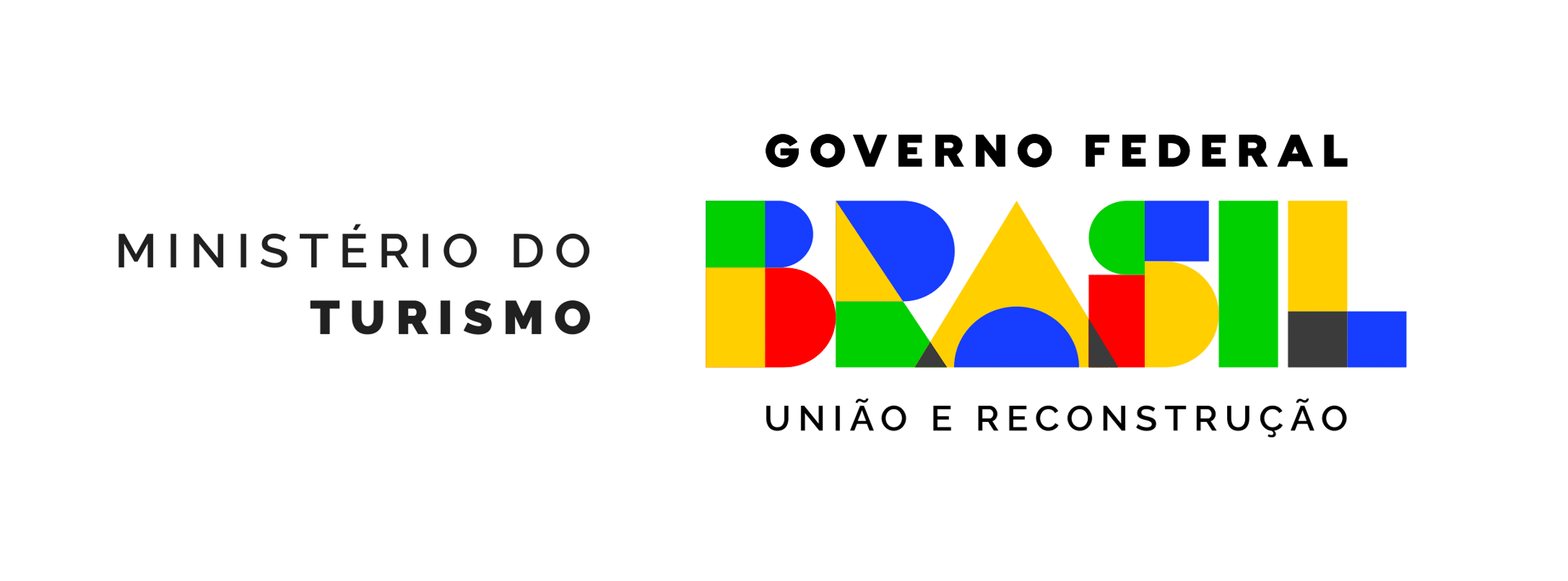

Agency overview
- Formed: 1 January 2003; 23 years ago
- Type: Ministry
- Jurisdiction: Federal government of Brazil
- Headquarters: Esplanada dos Ministérios, Bloco U Brasília, Federal District
- Annual budget: $826.9 m BRL (2023)
- Agency executives: Gustavo Feliciano, Minister; Ana Machado Lopes, Executive-Secretary; Milton Zuanazzi, Secretary of Planning, Sustainability and Competitiveness in Tourism; Carlos Henrique Sobral, Secretary of Infrastructure, Credit and Investments in Tourism
- Website: www.gov.br/turismo/

The Ministry of Tourism (Portuguese: Ministério do Turismo) is a cabinet-level federal ministry created on 1 January 2003. It is responsible for Embratur, the Brazilian Tourist Board.

Developing tourism as a sustainable economic activity with a relevant role for the generation of jobs and foreign currency and providing social inclusion. The Ministry of Tourism is innovating in the handling of public policies with a decentralized management model, guided by strategic thinking.

Its organizational structure comprises the National Secretariat of Tourism Policies, which assumes the role of carrying out the national policy for the sector, oriented by the directives from the national Council of Tourism. In addition, it is responsible for the internal promotion and oversees the quality of the provision of the Brazilian tourism service.

The National Secretariat of Programs for the Development of Tourism is responsible for subsidizing the formulation of plans, programs and actions for the strengthening of national tourism. The duties of the body are the promotion and development of infrastructure and the improvement in the quality of the services rendered.

EMBRATUR – Brazilian Tourism Institute, established on November 18, 1966, as a Brazilian tourism enterprise, had the objective of fostering tourism activity by making feasible conditions for the generation of jobs, income and development throughout the country.

Since January 2003, upon the establishment of the Ministry of Tourism, EMBRATUR's actions were concentrated in the promotion, marketing and support to the trading of products, services and tourism destinations.

== List of ministers ==
No.	Portrait	Minister	Took office	Left office	Time in office	Party	President
1	Walfrido dos Mares Guia	Walfrido dos Mares Guia (born 1942)	1 January 2003	22 March 2007	4 years, 80 days	PTB	Luiz Inácio Lula da Silva (PT)
2	Marta Suplicy	Marta Suplicy (born 1945)	22 March 2007	3 June 2008	1 year, 73 days	PT	Luiz Inácio Lula da Silva (PT)
3	Luiz Barreto Filho	Luiz Barreto Filho (born 1962)	3 June 2008	1 January 2011	2 years, 212 days	Independent	Luiz Inácio Lula da Silva (PT)
4	Pedro Novais	Pedro Novais (born 1930)	1 January 2011	14 September 2011	256 days	MDB	Dilma Rousseff (PT)
5	Gastão Vieira	Gastão Vieira (born 1946)	14 September 2011	17 March 2014	2 years, 184 days	MDB	Dilma Rousseff (PT)
6	Vinicius Lages	Vinicius Lages (born 1957)	17 March 2014	16 April 2015	1 year, 30 days	Independent	Dilma Rousseff (PT)
7	Henrique Eduardo Alves	Henrique Eduardo Alves (born 1948)	16 April 2015	28 March 2016	347 days	MDB	Dilma Rousseff (PT)
8	Alessandro Teixeira	Alessandro Teixeira (born 1972)	22 April 2016	12 May 2016	20 days	PT	Dilma Rousseff (PT)
9	Henrique Eduardo Alves	Henrique Eduardo Alves (born 1948)	12 May 2016	16 June 2016	35 days	MDB	Michel Temer (MDB)
10	Marx Beltrão	Marx Beltrão (born 1979)	5 October 2016	6 April 2018	1 year, 183 days	MDB	Michel Temer (MDB)
11	Vinicius Lummertz	Vinicius Lummertz (born 1960)	10 April 2018	1 January 2019	266 days	PSDB	Michel Temer (MDB)
12	Marcelo Álvaro Antônio	Marcelo Álvaro Antônio (born 1974)	1 January 2019	9 December 2020	1 year, 343 days	PSL	Jair Bolsonaro (PSL)
13	Gilson Machado Neto	Gilson Machado Neto (born 1968)	9 December 2020	31 March 2022	1 year, 112 days	PSC	Jair Bolsonaro (Ind)
14	Carlos Brito	Carlos Brito	31 March 2022	1 January 2023	276 days	Independent	Jair Bolsonaro (PL)
15	Daniela Carneiro	Daniela Carneiro (born 1976)	1 January 2023	13 July 2023	193 days	UNIÃO	Luiz Inácio Lula da Silva (PT)
16	Celso Sabino	Celso Sabino (born 1978)	13 July 2023	17 December 2025	2 years, 157 days	UNIÃO	Luiz Inácio Lula da Silva (PT)
17	Gustavo Feliciano	Gustavo Feliciano (born 1983)	23 December 2025	Incumbent	77 days	Independent	Luiz Inácio Lula da Silva (PT)

== See also ==
- Federal institutions of Brazil
