= Diocese of Itapipoca =

Catholic ecclesiastical territory

Diocese of Itapipoca Dioecesis Itapipocana Diocese de Itapipoca

Catholic
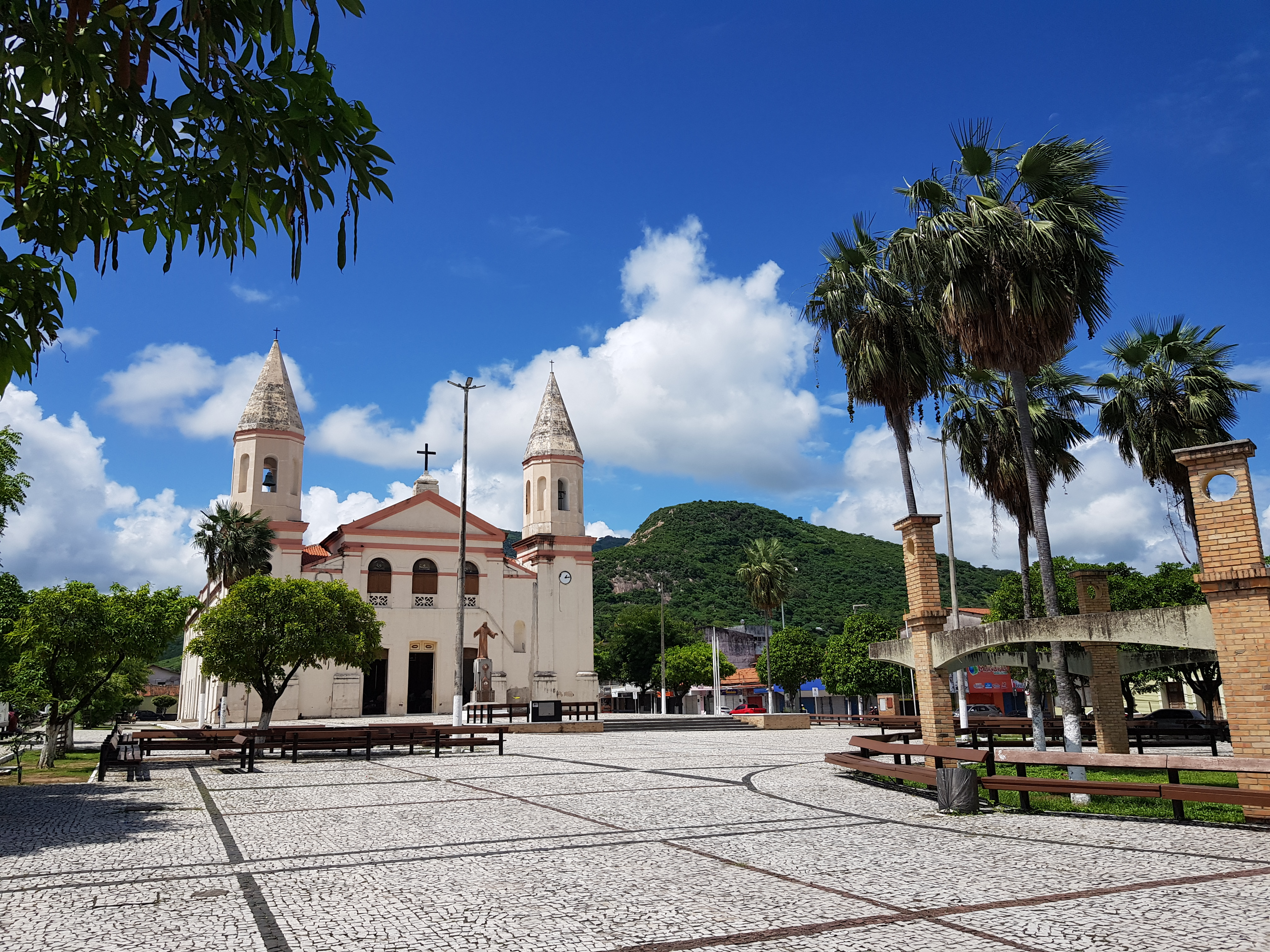
- Cathedral of Our Lady of Mercies

Location
- Country: Brazil
- Ecclesiastical province: Fortaleza
- Metropolitan: Fortaleza

Statistics
- Area: 11,266 km^{2} (4,350 sq mi)
- Population: Total; Catholics: (as of 2006); 457,000; 412,000 (90.2%)

Information
- Denomination: Catholic Church
- Rite: Latin Rite
- Established: 13 March 1971 (55 years ago)
- Cathedral: Cathedral of Our Lady of Mercy in Itapipoca

Current leadership
- Pope: Leo XIV
- Bishop: Rosalvo Cordeiro de Lima
- Metropolitan Archbishop: Gregório Leozírio Ben Lâmed da Paixão Neto, O.S.B.
- Bishops emeritus: Benedito Francisco de Albuquerque

Website
- diocesedeitapipoca.org.br

The Roman Catholic Diocese of Itapipoca (Latin: Dioecesis Itapipocana) is located in the ecclesiastical province of Fortaleza in Brazil. On March 13, 1971, it was established as the Diocese of Itapipoca from the Metropolitan Archdiocese of Fortaleza.

== Leadership ==
- Bishops of Itapipoca (Roman rite)
  - Bishop Paulo Eduardo Andrade Ponte (1971.06.25 – 1984.03.20), appointed Archbishop of São Luís do Maranhão
  - Bishop Benedito Francisco de Albuquerque (1985.01.04 – 2005.05.25), retired
  - Bishop Antônio Roberto Cavuto, OFMCap (2005.05.25 – 2020.10.07), retired
  - Bishop Rosalvo Cordeiro de Lima (2020.10.07 – Present)
