= Ângela Portela =

Brazilian politician

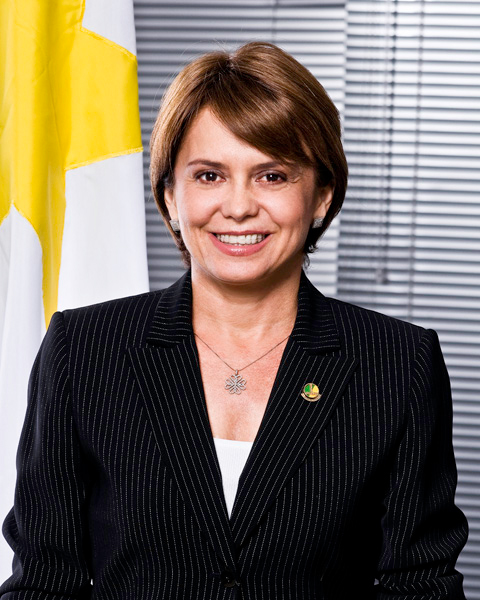

Senator from Roraima
- In office February 1, 2011 – February 1, 2019

Deputy from Roraima
- In office February 1, 2007 – January 31, 2011

Personal details
- Born: February 3, 1962 (age 64) Coreaú, Ceará, Brazil
- Party: PP
- Profession: Professor

Ângela Portela (born February 3, 1962) is a Brazilian politician. She has represented Roraima in the Federal Senate from 2011 to 2019. Previously, she was a Deputy from Roraima from 2007 to 2011. She was a member of the Democratic Labour Party.
