= Paulo Antonino Mascarenhas Roxo =

Brazilian priest (1928–2022)

His Excellency Paulo Antonino Mascarenhas Roxo
- Bishop Emeritus of Mogi das Cruzes
- Diocese: Mogi das Cruzes
- Appointed: 18 November 1989
- Term ended: 4 August 2004
- Predecessor: Emílio Pignoli
- Successor: Airton José dos Santos

Orders
- Ordination: 20 August 1952 by Paulo Rolim Loureiro
- Consecration: 28 January 1990 by Carlo Furno

Personal details
- Born: 12 June 1928 São Geraldo, Minas Gerais, Brazil
- Died: 1 June 2022 (aged 93) São Paulo, Brazil

Paulo Antonio Mascarenhas Roxo O. Praem. (12 June 1928 – 1 June 2022) was a Brazilian Roman Catholic prelate.

Mascarenhas Roxo was born in Brazil and was ordained to the priesthood in 1952. He served as bishop of the Roman Catholic Diocese of Mogi das Cruzes, Brazil, from 1990 until his retirement in 2014.

Catholic Church titles
Preceded by Emílio Pignoli	Bishop of Mogi das Cruzes; 1989–2004	Succeeded by Airton José dos Santos
