= Gilson Machado Filho =

Brazilian politician (born 1998)

Member of the Legislative Assembly of Pernambuco
- Incumbent
- Assumed office 1 February 2027

Personal details
- Born: 20 August 1998 (age 28)
- Party: Podemos
- Parent: Gilson Machado Neto (father)

Gilson Machado Guimarães (born 20 August 1998), better known as Gilson Machado Filho, is a Brazilian politician who was elected member of the Legislative Assembly of Pernambuco in 2026. He has been a member of the Municipal Chamber of Recife since 2025. He is the son of Gilson Machado Neto.
