= Caput Cilla =

Roman Empire - Mauretania Caesariensis (125 AD)

Caput Cilla, an Ancient city and former bishopric in Roman North Africa, is now a Latin Catholic titular see. Its presumed location are the ruins of El-Gouéa, in modern Algeria.

== History ==
Caput Cilla was important enough in the Roman province of Mauretania Caesariensis to become a suffragan bishopric of its capital Caesarea Mauretaniae's Metropolitan, but later faded.

=== Titular see ===
The diocese was nominally restored in 1933 as a Latin Catholic titular bishopric; the Curiate Italian name is Capocilla.

It has had the following incumbents, of the lowest (episcopal) rank, except the latest (archiepiscopal, the intermediary rank) :

- Leobard D’Souza (1964.11.12 – 1965.12.17) as coadjutor bishop of Jabalpur, India (1964.11.12 – 1965.12.17), succeeded as Bishop of Jabalpur (1965.12.17 – 1975.07.01); later Metropolitan Archbishop of Nagpur, India (1975.07.01 – 1998.01.17), Vice-President of Conference of Catholic Bishops of India (1988 – 1991)
- James Philip Mulvihill, Missionary Oblates of Mary Immaculate (O.M.I.) (1965.12.18 – 1967.07.13)
- Félix Ley (フェリックス・レイ), Order of Friars Minor Capuchin (O.F.M. Cap.) (1968.03.11 – 1972.01.23)
- John Hubert Macey Rodgers, Marists (S.M.) (1972.04.07 – 1973.03.01)
- Guy Armand Romano, Congregation of the Most Holy Redeemer (C.SS.R.) (1984.06.25 – 1997.03.03)
- Joseph Fred Naumann (1997.07.08 – 2004.01.07) as auxiliary bishop of Saint Louis (USA) (1997.07.08 – 2004.01.07), coadjutor archbishop of Kansas City (USA) (2004.01.07 – 2005.01.15), succeeding as metropolitan archbishop of Kansas City in Kansas (2005.01.15 – ...), also Apostolic Administrator of Kansas City–Saint Joseph (USA) (2015.04.21 – 2015.09.15)
- Juan Navarro Castellanos (2004.01.31 – 2009.02.12)
- Titular Archbishop Ilson de Jesus Montanari (2013.10.12 – ...), Secretary of the Congregation for Bishops, Secretary of College of Cardinals

== See also ==
- Catholic Church in Algeria
