= Diocese of Franca =

Catholic ecclesiastical territory

Coordinates: 20.5394°S 47.4014°W

Diocese of Franca Dioecesis Francopolitana

Catholic

Location
- Country: Brazil
- Ecclesiastical province: Ribeirão Preto

Statistics
- Area: 6,721 km^{2} (2,595 sq mi)
- Population: Total; Catholics: (as of 2004); 760,000; 600,000 (78.9%)

Information
- Rite: Latin Rite
- Established: 20 February 1971 (55 years ago)
- Cathedral: Catedral Nossa Senhora da Conceição

Current leadership
- Pope: Leo XIV
- Bishop: Paulo Roberto Beloto
- Metropolitan Archbishop: Moacir Silva

Map
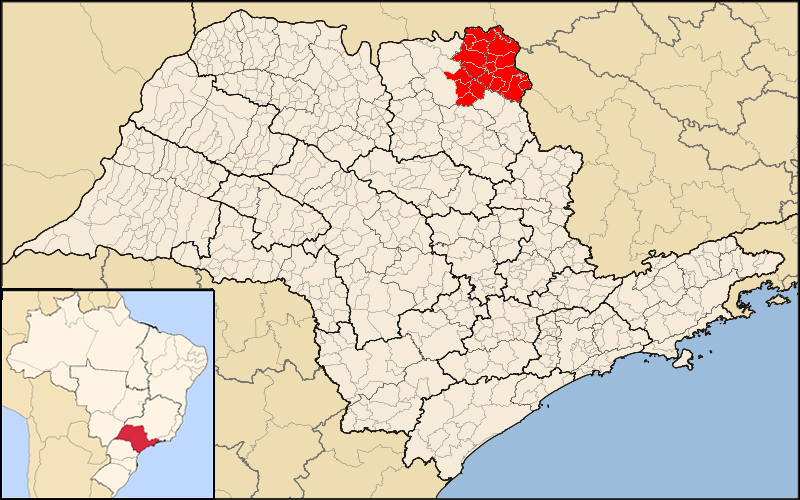

The Roman Catholic Diocese of Franca (Latin: Dioecesis Francopolitana) is a diocese located in the city of Franca in the ecclesiastical province of Ribeirão Preto in Brazil.

== History ==
- 20 February 1971: Established as Diocese of Franca from the Diocese of Rio Preto

== Bishops ==
- Bishops of Franca (Roman rite)
  - Diógenes da Silva Matthes (1971.03.11 – 2006.11.29)
  - Caetano Ferrari, O.F.M. (2006.11.29 – 2009-04-15), appointed Bishop of Bauru, São Paulo
  - Pedro Luiz Stringhini (2009-12-30 - 2012-09-19), appointed Bishop of Mogi das Cruzes, São Paulo
  - Paulo Roberto Beloto (2013.10.23 - ...)

=== Coadjutor bishop ===
- Caetano Ferrari, O.F.M. (2002-2006)

=== Other priests of this diocese who became bishops ===
- Emílio Pignoli, appointed Bishop of Mogi das Cruzes, São Paulo in 1976
- Ângelo Pignoli, appointed Bishop of Quixadá, Ceara in 2007
- Pedro Carlos Cipolini (priest here, 1978-1987), appointed Bishop of Amparo, São Paulo in 2010
- Devair Araújo da Fonseca, appointed Auxiliary Bishop of São Paulo in 2014
