= St. Sebastian Cathedral, Ribeirão Preto =

Coordinates: 21.1781°S 47.8108°W

St. Sebastian Cathedral
- Catedral Metropolitana São Sebastião
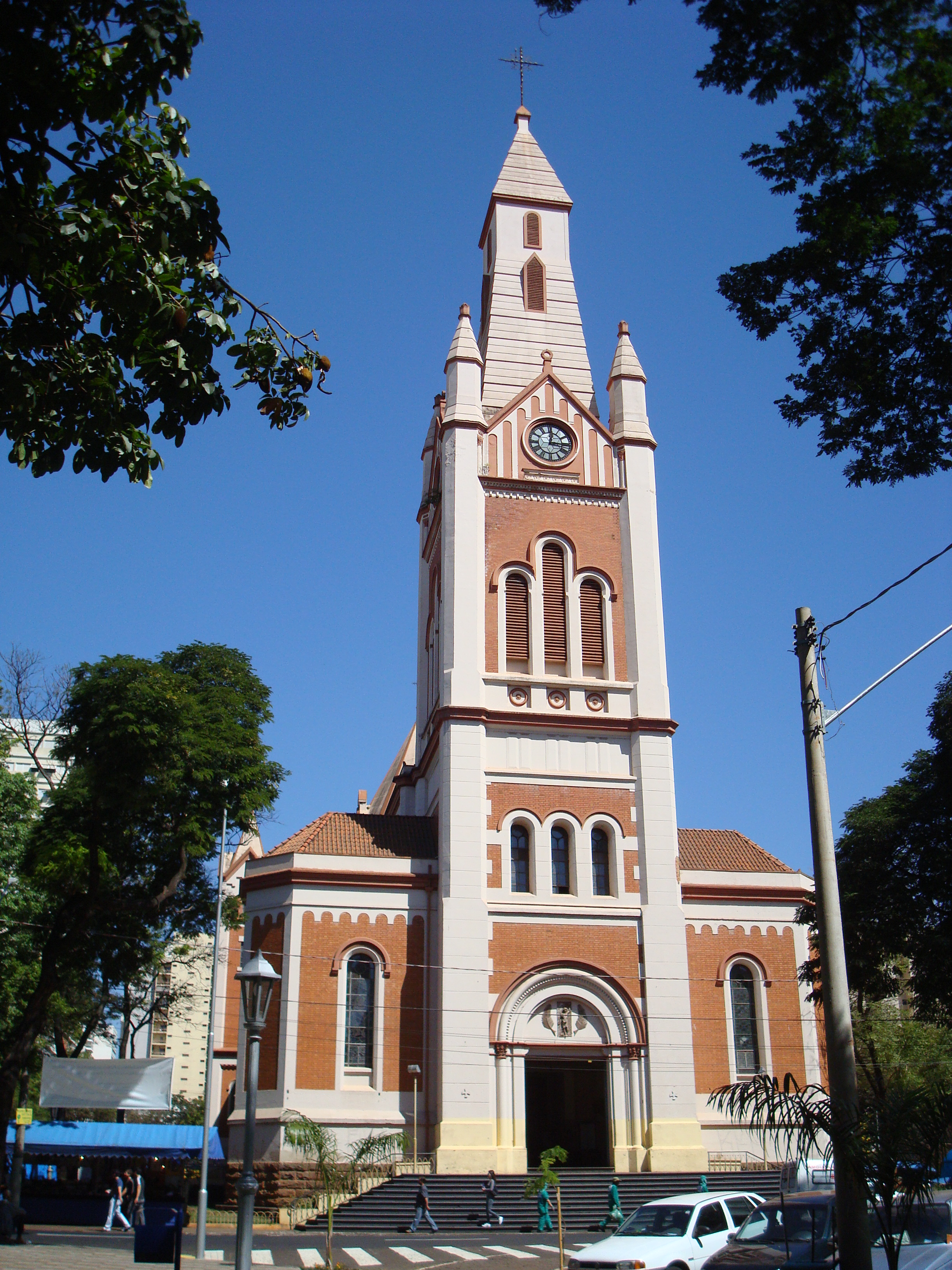
- St. Sebastian Cathedral
- Location: Ribeirão Preto
- Country: Brazil
- Denomination: Roman Catholic Church

Administration
- Archdiocese: Ribeirão Preto

The Cathedral of St. Sebastian (Portuguese: Catedral Metropolitana São Sebastião), also referred to as Ribeirão Preto Cathedral, is the seat of the Roman Catholic Archbishop of Ribeirão Preto and the main Catholic church in Ribeirão Preto, São Paulo, Brazil.

The population of the city expanded greatly after its 1856 founding as coffee cultivation brought wealth to the region. Construction on the first church, also called “velha Matriz” (mother church), began in 1866 and was finished in 1870, in what is now the XV de Novembro Square. Barely two decades later, the towers of this building collapsed, and in 1892 a commission of leading townspeople was formed to build a more grandiose replacement. Design and construction was repeatedly halted and restarted over the next decade owing to differing visions for the structure as well as a lack of funds. The cornerstone of the current building was finally laid March 3, 1904 with construction continuing for the next four years. In 1909, Pope Pius X erected the Diocese of Ribeirão Preto, and St. Sebastian's was named its cathedral.

The cathedral buildings and its surrounding campus were declared protected by the Council for the Defense of Historical, Archaeological, Artistic and Tourist Heritage (Condephaat) in 2014.

== See also ==
- Catholic Church in Brazil

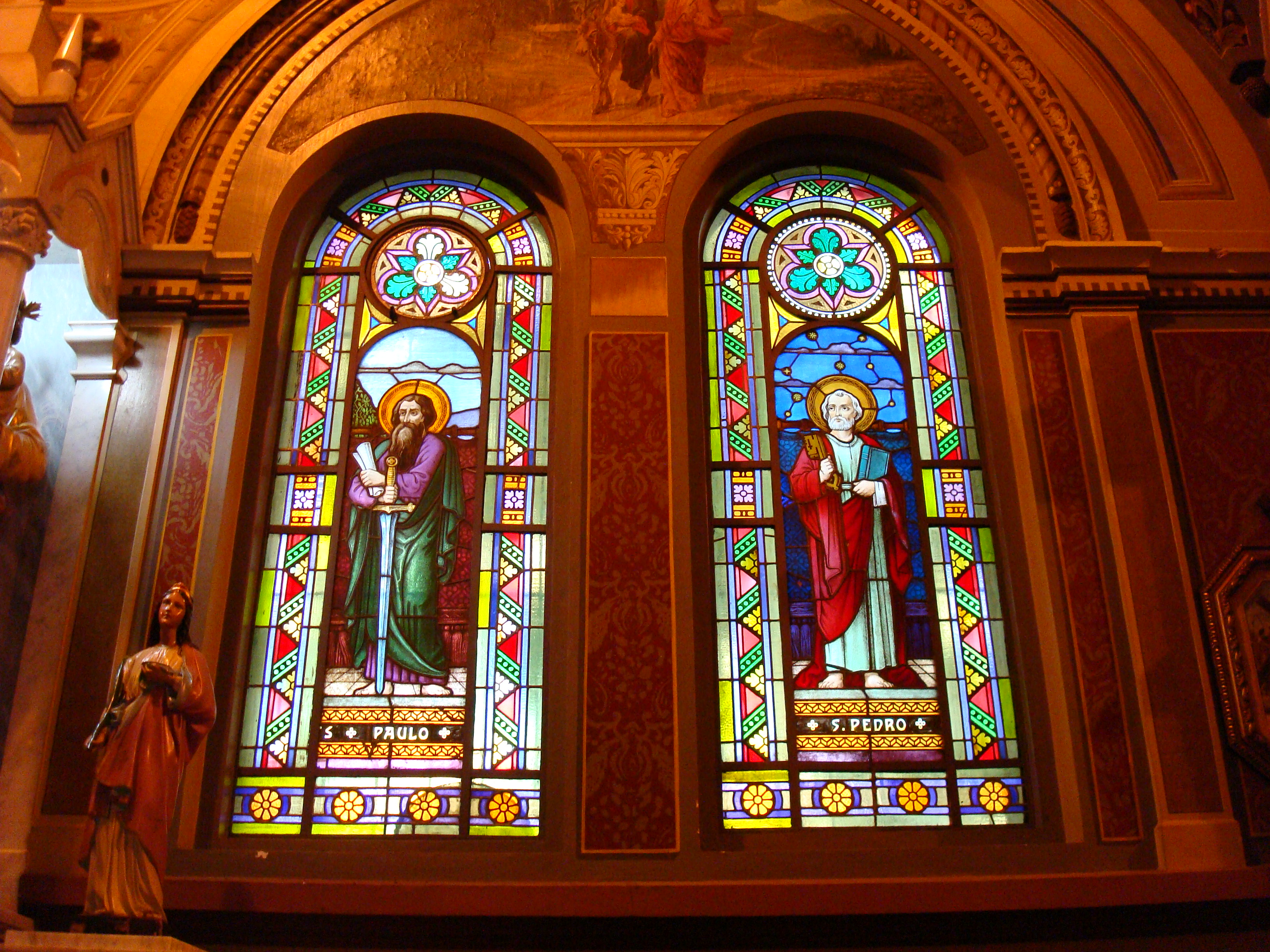
Internal view
