= Marcelo Álvaro Antônio =

Brazilian entrepreneur and politician

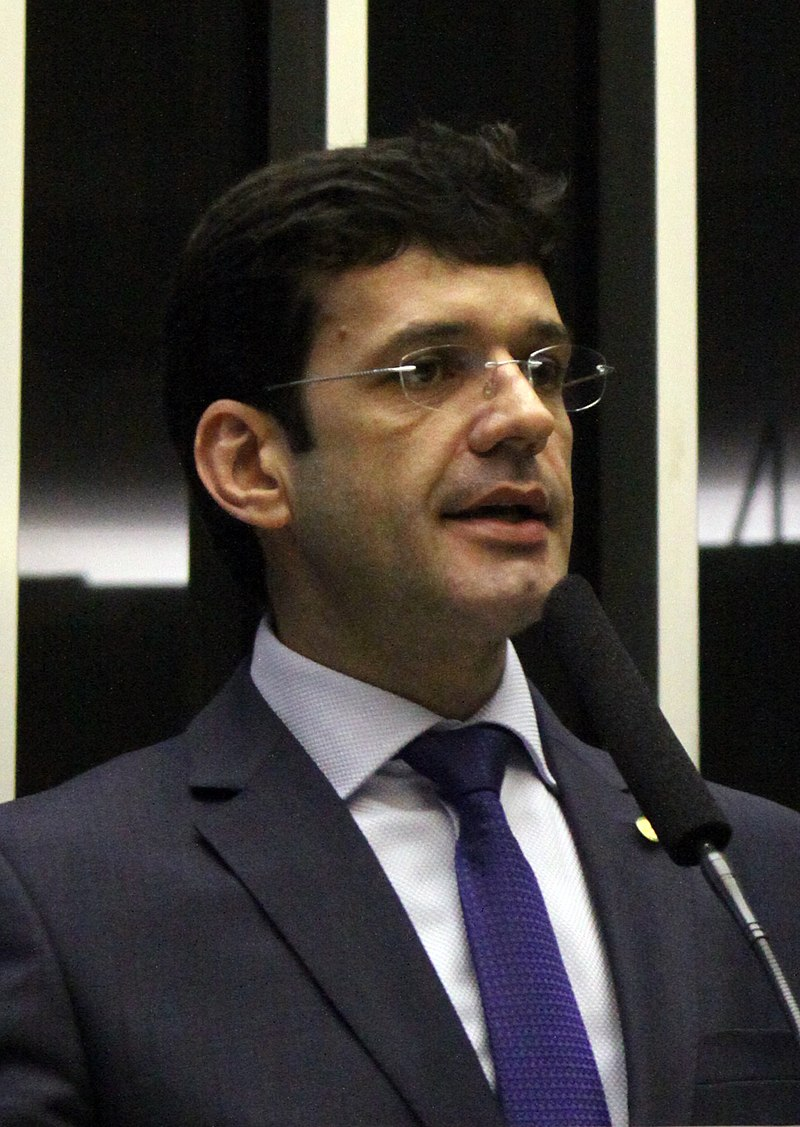

Minister of Tourism
- In office 1 January 2019 – 9 December 2020
- President: Jair Bolsonaro
- Preceded by: Vinicius Lummertz
- Succeeded by: Gilson Machado

Member of the Chamber of Deputies
- Incumbent
- Assumed office 1 February 2015
- Constituency: Minas Gerais

Member of the Municipal Chamber of Belo Horizonte
- In office 1 January 2013 – 1 February 2015
- Constituency: At-large

Personal details
- Born: Marcelo Henrique Teixeira Dias; 16 February 1974 (age 52) Belo Horizonte, Minas Gerais, Brazil
- Party: PL (since 2022)
- Other political affiliations: PL (1999–2006); PR (2006–2011); PRP (2011–2015); PMB (2015–2016); PR (2016–2018); PSL (2018–2022)
- Children: Amanda Teixeira Dias
- Awards: Order of Naval Merit (Grand Officer) (Note: Portuguese: Ordem do Mérito Naval - Grande-Oficial); Peacemaker Medal (Note: Portuguese: Medalha do Pacificador)

Marcelo Henrique Teixeira Dias, popularly known as Marcelo Álvaro Antônio (born 16 February 1974), is a Brazilian entrepreneur and politician, and former Minister of Tourism of Brazil (January 2019 -December 2020).

He is presently a federal deputy for Minas Gerais (since 2015).

He was the most voted Federal Deputy in Minas Gerais in the 2018 elections, when he was re-elect with 230,008 votes. He first entered politics in 2012, as a city councillor of Belo Horizonte and member of the Progressive Republican Party (PRP). He is the son of Vilma Penido Dias and former deputy Álvaro Antônio Teixeira Dias. He is married to Janaína Cardoso, with three children: Amanda, Ana Clara and Paulo Henrique. He has Barreiro as his main electoral region.

Marcelo is currently a member of the Liberal Party (PL).

== Parliamentary career ==
Elected with 8,846 votes for City Councillor of Belo Horizonte in 2012, he was the 9th most voted for candidate in the city. He presented bills to enlarge the popular participation in the decisions of the Municipal Chamber of Belo Horizonte. He created a bill to establish the Councillor of the Neighbourhood, to and promote the participation of citizens in municipal politics. He was a candidate for Federal Deputy in 2014 and was elected with 60,384 votes, the 3rd most voted-for candidate in Belo Horizonte. In 2016, he was a candidate for Mayor of Belo Horizonte, representing the Party of the Republic (PR). In 2018, he was re-elected for the Chamber of Deputies, as a member of the Social Liberal Party (PSL), with 230,008 votes, the most voted-for candidate in Minas Gerais.

== Positions in major votes ==
Subject	Date	Vote
Impeachment of Dilma Rousseff	17 April 2016	Yes
Removal of Eduardo Cunha	12 September 2016	Yes
Outsourcing Regulation	22 March 2017	Yes
Labor Reform	26 April 2017	No
Investigation against Michel Temer	2 August 2017; 26 October 2017	Yes
Approval of SNTV	20 September 2017	No
Creation of Electoral Fund of R$ 1.7 bi	5 October 2017	No

== Controversies ==
=== Accusation of embezzlement ===
On 4 February 2019, Folha de S. Paulo reported the suspect of a scheme of fake candidacies, directing the money from public funds to companies linked to his Chamber cabinet. As Chairman of the party in Minas Gerais, he was responsible to direct R$279,000 (US$ 76,358.86) to the candidates, which was the minimum value imposed by the Electoral Justice destinated to women candidate to political offices. From the R$279,000 sent to the candidates, at least R$85,000 (US$ 23,263.45) were sent to bank accounts of four companies belonging to assistants, family members or associates of assistant of Marcelo Álvaro.

=== Layman candidacies ===
The Electoral Public Prosecutor's Office of Minas Gerais denounced, on 4 October 2019, the Minister of Tourism Marcelo Álvaro Antônio for three crimes involving lawman candidacies of the party in 2018. Ten other people were denounced. The crimes are: ideological falsehood, electoral misappropriation and criminal association.

The Minister's indictment made by the Federal Police occurred on 3 October 2019 for the electoral crime of omission in accountability and criminal association. The investigations were made as a joint force between the Police and the Public Prosecutor's Office.

=== Attempt of censorship ===
In February 2019, judge Grace Correa Pereira Maia, of the 9th Civil Circuit of Brasília, rejected a request made by Marcelo Álvaro to convict the notices of Folha de S. Paulo which linked him to the strawperson scheme. According to the judge, there were no evidences that the reports contained fake informations.

[The] removal of the reportage from circulation configures censorship in any hypothesis, what can only be admitted in extreme situations, what is not the case.

— Grace Correa Pereira Maia

The Brazilian Association of Investigative Journalism (Abraji) published a note:

Abraji considers unacceptable that a public authority tries to promote the censorship to a media. Looking to stop the publishing of informations of public interest under the argument of offense to honor is a disservice to democracy.

== Notes ==
Political offices
Preceded by Vinicius Lummertz	Minister of Tourism; 2019–2020	Succeeded by Gilson Machado
