= Celso Sabino =

Brazilian politician (born 1978)

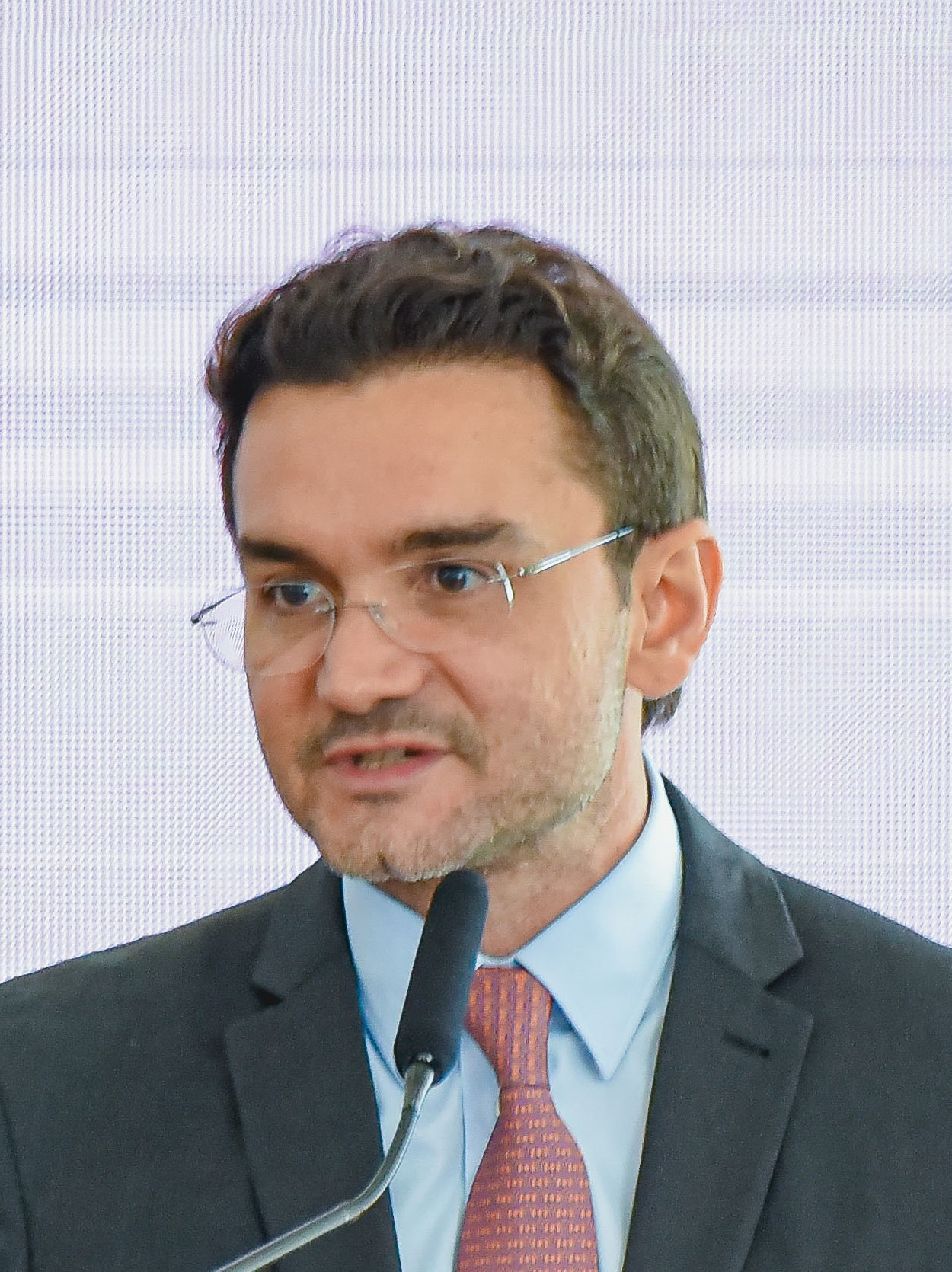
- Sabino in 2023

Minister of Tourism
- In office 3 August 2023 – 17 December 2025
- President: Luiz Inácio Lula da Silva
- Preceded by: Daniela Carneiro
- Succeeded by: Gustavo Feliciano

Federal Deputy
- Incumbent
- Assumed office 1 February 2019
- Constituency: Pará

State Deputy of Pará
- In office 1 February 2015 – 1 February 2019
- Constituency: At-large

Personal details
- Born: Celso Sabino de Oliveira; 29 August 1978 (age 48) Belém, Pará, Brazil
- Party: Independent (since 2025)
- Other political affiliations: PP (2001–2009); PR (2009–2013); PSDB (2013–2021); PSL (2021–2022); UNIÃO (2022–2025)
- Profession: Tax auditor

Celso Sabino de Oliveira (born 29 August 1978) is a Brazilian politician serving as a member of the Chamber of Deputies since 2019. He had served as minister of Tourism from 2023 to 2025.

Political offices
Preceded by Daniela Carneiro	Minister of Tourism; 2023–2025	Succeeded by Gustavo Feliciano
