= Teresa Portela =

Teresa Portela may refer to:

- Teresa Portela (Portuguese canoeist) (born 1987)
- Teresa Portela (Spanish canoeist) (born 1982)
