= Juan Portela =

Spanish footballer (born 1984)

Personal information
- Full name: Juan Antonio Portela Muñoz
- Date of birth: 22 October 1984 (age 42)
- Place of birth: Jerez de la Frontera, Spain
- Height: 1.78 m (5 ft 10 in)
- Position: Left back

Youth career
- Xerez

Senior career*
Years	Team	Apps	(Gls)
2003–2007	Xerez B		
2004–2009	Xerez	21	(0)
2009–2010	Ceuta	28	(1)
2010–2011	Écija	36	(0)
2011–2012	Puertollano	30	(0)
2012–2014	Sanluqueño	16	(0)
- * Club domestic league appearances and goals

Juan Antonio Portela Muñoz (born 22 October 1984) is a Spanish former footballer who played as a left defender.

== Club career ==
Born in Jerez de la Frontera, Province of Cádiz, Portela graduated from Xerez CD's youth system, making his senior debuts with the reserves in the regional championships. Also in the 2003–04 season he made his professional debut, coming on as a late substitute of a 0–1 away loss against Polideportivo Ejido on 19 June 2004, in the Segunda División. Portela continued to appear with the B-team in the following seasons, however.

On 3 June 2007 Portela returned to first-team duties, starting in a 0–0 away draw against Albacete Balompié. A month later he signed a new two-year deal with the Andalusians, but was released two seasons later.

In the following years Portela competed in Segunda División B, representing AD Ceuta, Écija Balompié, CD Puertollano and Atlético Sanluqueño CF.
