= Paulo Eduardo Andrade Ponte =

Roman Catholic archbishop (1931–2009)

- Archbishop of São Luís do Maranhão
- Church: Catholic Church
- Archdiocese: Archdiocese of São Luís do Maranhão
- In office: 20 March 1984 – 21 September 2005
- Predecessor: João José da Mota e Albuquerque
- Successor: José Belisário da Silva
- Previous post: Bishop of Itapipoca (1971-1984)

Orders
- Ordination: 3 April 1954
- Consecration: 21 November 1971 by José de Medeiros Delgado

Personal details
- Born: 24 June 1931 Fortaleza, Ceará, Republic of the United States of Brazil
- Died: 15 March 2009 (aged 77) São Luís, Maranhão, Brazil

Paulo Eduardo Andrade Ponte (24 June 1931 in Fortaleza – 15 March 2009) was the Brazilian Archbishop of the Roman Catholic Archdiocese of São Luís do Maranhão from 1984 until his retirement in 2005. He had previously served as the Bishop of the Roman Catholic Diocese of Itapipoca from 1971 until 1984, when Ponte was elevated to the Archbishop of São Luís do Maranhão by Pope John Paul II.

Paulo Eduardo Andrade Ponte died on 15 March 2009, in São Luís, Maranhão, Brazil, at the age of 77.
