= O Povo =

Brazilian tabloid newspaper

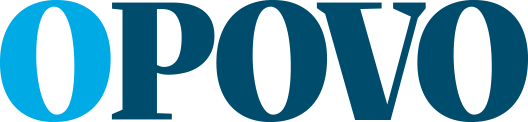
- Format: Standard
- Owner: Grupo de Comunicação O Povo
- Founder: Demócrito Rocha
- President: Luciana Dammar
- Language: Portuguese
- Headquarters: Fortaleza
- Country: Brazil
- Circulation: 17,298 copies in 2015 (daily average, print runs)
- Price: R$ 3.00 (daily edition) R$ 4.00 (Sunday edition)
- Website: www.opovo.com.br

O Povo, stylized as O POVO, is a Brazilian tabloid newspaper. Among the oldest Brazilian newspapers, it has been published since 1928. It is and has always been printed in Fortaleza, the capital of the Brazilian state of Ceará. It has a daily circulation of about 120,000 and is released in the morning.

== Official site ==
- (in Portuguese) O Povo official website
