= Márcio Canella =

Brazilian politician (born 1977)

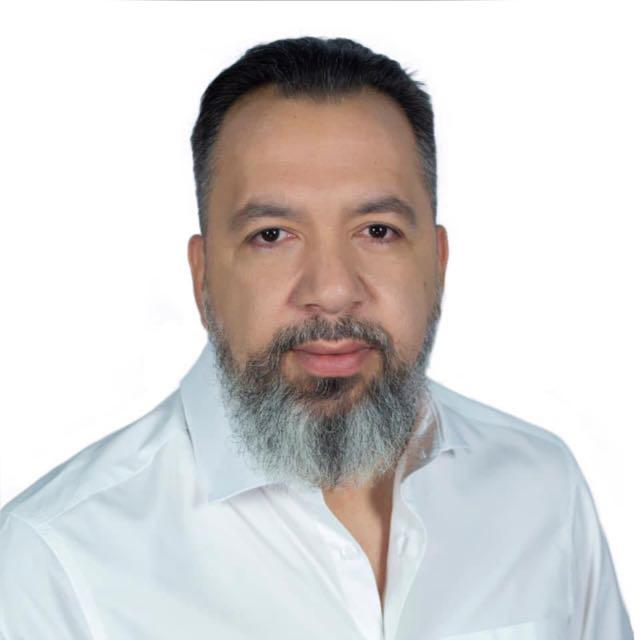
- Canella in 2021

Mayor of Belford Roxo
- Incumbent
- Assumed office 1 January 2025
- Preceded by: Waguinho

Personal details
- Born: 25 June 1977 (age 49)
- Party: Brazil Union (since 2022)

Márcio Correia de Oliveira, better known as Márcio Canella (born 25 June 1977), is a Brazilian politician serving as mayor of Belford Roxo since 2025. From 2015 to 2024, he was a member of the Legislative Assembly of Rio de Janeiro.

He was arrested in July 07 2026 after Federal Police find a rifle in the car of a Senate candidate.
