= Emílio Pignoli =

Italian-born Brazilian Roman Catholic bishop (born 1932)

His Excellency, The Most Reverend Emílio Pignoli
- Bishop Emeritus of Campo Limpo
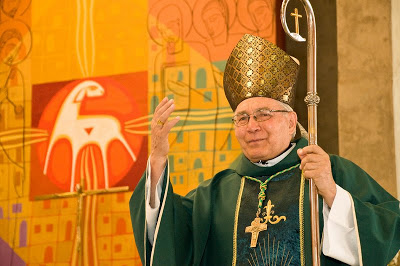
- Church: Catholic Church
- Archdiocese: São Paulo
- Diocese: Campo Limpo
- Appointed: 15 March 1989
- Installed: 4 June 1989
- Term ended: 30 July 2008
- Successor: Luiz Antônio Guedes
- Previous post: Bishop of Mogi das Cruzes (1976–1989)

Orders
- Ordination: 29 June 1957
- Consecration: 24 June 1976 by Carmine Rocco

Personal details
- Born: Emílio Pignoli; 14 December 1932 (age 93) Cappella de' Picenardi, Province of Cremona, Kingdom of Italy
- Motto: Consolidai vossa vocação

Emílio Pignoli (born 14 December 1932) is an Italian-born Brazilian Roman Catholic prelate who served as Bishop of Campo Limpo from 1989 to 2008. He previously served as Bishop of Mogi das Cruzes from 1976 until his transfer to the newly established Diocese of Campo Limpo in 1989.

== Early life and priesthood ==
Pignoli was born on 14 December 1932 in Cappella de' Picenardi, in the Province of Cremona, Italy. From an early age he expressed a desire to become a priest and studied in the seminary of Cremona. After completing philosophical studies, he volunteered for missionary service in Brazil, arriving in the country at the age of nineteen.

He was ordained a priest on 29 June 1957 and was later incardinated into the Diocese of Franca on 20 February 1971.

== Episcopal ministry ==
=== Bishop of Mogi das Cruzes ===
On 29 April 1976, Pope Paul VI appointed Pignoli Bishop of Mogi das Cruzes. He received episcopal consecration on 24 June 1976 from Archbishop Carmine Rocco, Apostolic Nuncio to Brazil, with Archbishop Bernardo José Bueno Miele and Bishop Diógenes da Silva Matthes serving as co-consecrators.

Pignoli governed the Diocese of Mogi das Cruzes for approximately thirteen years before being transferred to Campo Limpo.

=== Bishop of Campo Limpo ===
On 15 March 1989, Pope John Paul II appointed Pignoli the first bishop of the newly created Diocese of Campo Limpo, which was erected from territory of the Archdiocese of São Paulo. He took canonical possession of the diocese on 4 June 1989.

As the founding bishop, Pignoli oversaw the establishment of diocesan structures and promoted pastoral development in one of the fastest-growing regions of the São Paulo metropolitan area. During his episcopate he encouraged priestly and religious vocations, ordained more than 130 priests, and supervised the construction of numerous churches, seminaries, and the Cathedral Shrine of the Holy Family (Catedral Santuário Sagrada Família).

The diocesan pastoral plans implemented during his episcopate became an important framework for evangelization and ecclesiastical organization in Campo Limpo. These plans continued to influence diocesan life after his retirement and have been cited as a significant aspect of the diocese's historical development.

His episcopal motto is Consolidai vossa vocação ("Strengthen your vocation"), derived from 2 Peter 1:10.

In an interview reflecting on his missionary vocation and episcopal ministry, Pignoli emphasized the importance of evangelization, priestly formation, and pastoral closeness to the faithful, themes that characterized much of his service in Brazil.

=== Retirement ===
Upon reaching the canonical retirement age, Pignoli submitted his resignation from pastoral governance of the Diocese of Campo Limpo. Pope Benedict XVI accepted his resignation on 30 July 2008 and appointed Luiz Antônio Guedes as his successor.

In December 2022, the Diocese of Campo Limpo celebrated Pignoli's 90th birthday, recognizing his role as the founding bishop of the diocese and his long service to the Church in Brazil.
