= Arnaldo Ribeiro =

Roman Catholic archbishop (1930–2009)

- Archbishop of Ribeirão Preto
- Church: Roman Catholic Church
- Archdiocese: Ribeirão Preto
- See: Ribeirão Preto
- Appointed: 28 December 1988
- Installed: 28 December 1988
- Term ended: 05 April 2006
- Predecessor: Romeu Alberti
- Successor: Joviano de Lima Júnior, S.S.S.
- Other posts: Auxiliary Bishop of Belo Horizonte (1946); Titular Bishop of Sicilibba (1975-1988)

Orders
- Ordination: 13 March 1954 by Antônio dos Santos Cabral
- Consecration: 27 December 1975 by João Resende Costa, S.D.B.
- Rank: Archbishop

Personal details
- Born: Arnaldo Ribeiro; 7 January 1930 Belo Horizonte, Minas Gerais, Brazil
- Died: 15 December 2009 (aged 79) Belo Horizonte, Minas Gerais, Brazil

Arnaldo Ribeiro (January 7, 1930–December 15, 2009) was the Roman Catholic Archbishop of the Roman Catholic Archdiocese of Ribeirão Preto, Brazil.

Ordained to the priesthood on March 13, 1954, in the Archdiocese of Belo Horizonte, Ribeiro was named auxiliary bishop of the Belo Horizonte Archdiocese on November 6, 1975, and was ordained bishop on December 27, 1975. On December 28, 1988, Ribeiro was named Archbishop of the Ribeirão Preto Archdiocese; he retired on April 5, 2006.
