= Castellum Tatroportus =

Castellum Tatroportus, also known as Tatroporto Castle or Latin: Diocesis Castellotatro-Portensis, was a Roman–Berber civitas and former Roman Catholic diocese that flourished through the Vandal and Roman eras and into late antiquity. It was located in the province of Mauretania Caesariensis in Africa Proconsulare, though an exact location has not been identified.

Bishop Reparatus took part in the synod assembled in Carthage in 484 by the Vandal King Huneric, after which Reparatus was exiled. The current bishop is Teodoro Gómez Rivera, of Tegucigalpa.

The town seems to have lasted until at least the Muslim conquest of the Maghreb.
