= Belford Roxo =

- Municipality
- Município do Belford Roxo; Municipality of Belford Roxo
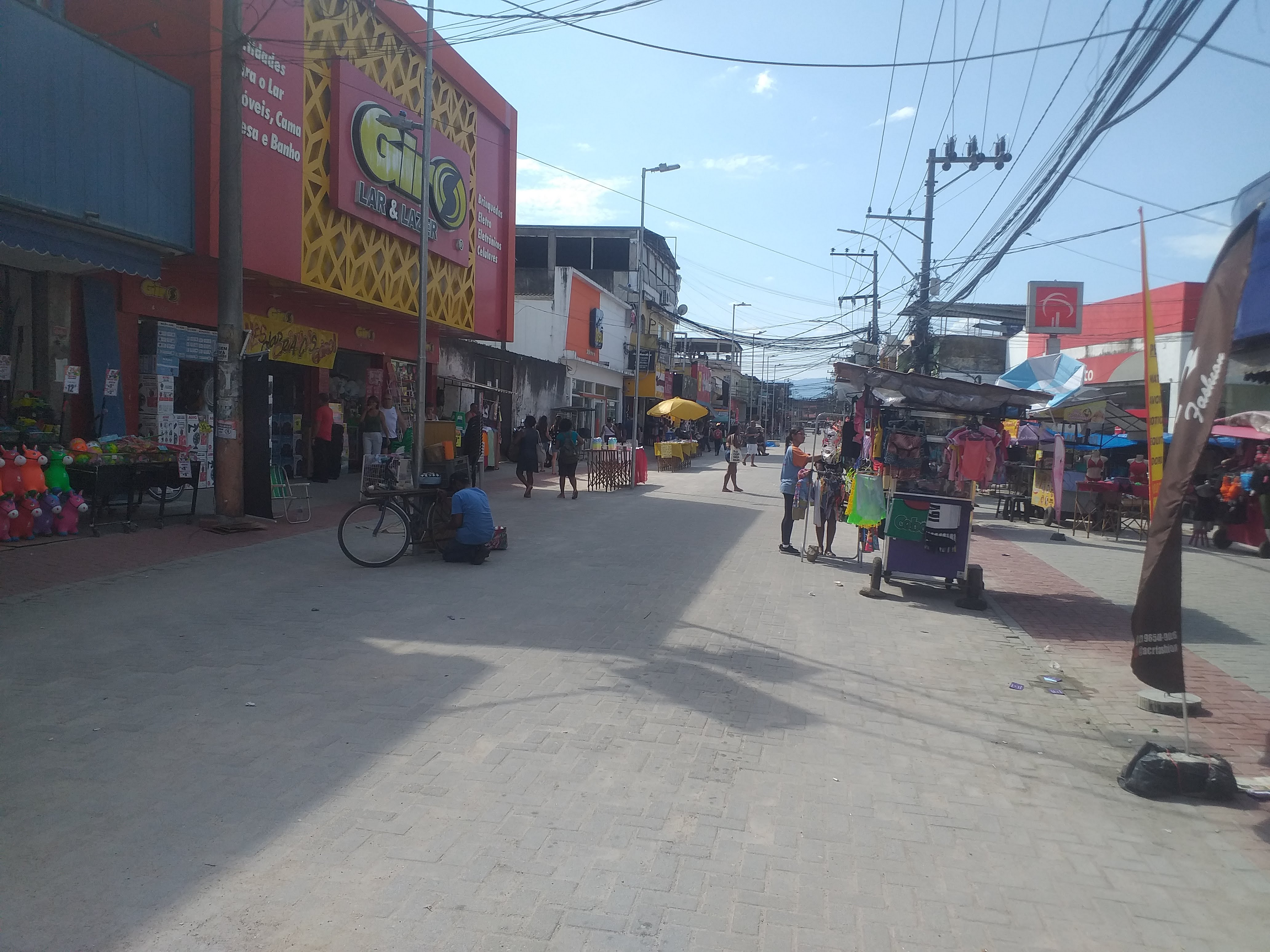
- Lote XV neighborhood's boardwalk

- Flag Coat of arms
- Motto: Paz e Progresso (Peace and Progress)
- Location of Belford Roxo in the state of Rio de Janeiro

- Localization in Brazil
- Coordinates: 22°45′50″S 43°23′56″W
- Country: Brazil
- Region: Southeast
- State: Rio de Janeiro
- City Established: April 3, 1990

Government
  - Type: Mayor-council
  - Body: Prefeitura da Cidade do Rio de Janeiro
  - Mayor: Márcio Canella

Area
  - Total: 78.98 km^{2} (30.49 sq mi)
- Elevation: 38 m (125 ft)

Population (2025)
  - Total: 518,384
  - Density: 6,563/km^{2} (17,000/sq mi)
- Demonym: belford-roxense
- Time zone: UTC−3 (BRT)
  - Summer (DST): UTC−2 (BRST)
- Area code: +55 21

Belford Roxo (Portuguese pronunciation: [ˈbɛwfɔʁ ˈʁoʃu]) is a city in the state of Rio de Janeiro, Brazil. It is part of the metropolitan region of the city of Rio de Janeiro and was created in 1990.

== Demography ==
According to Census of 2022 of IBGE, the population was 483,087 inhabitants. In 2025, the population was estimated at 518,384.

== Notable people ==
- Dennis Dauttmam (1964–2025), former mayor of Belford Roxo.
- Seu Jorge
- Gerson, Brazilian footballer.
- Johnny Walker, Brazilian mixed martial artist.
