= Coreaú =

Municipality in Ceará, Brazil

Coordinates: 3.53278°S 40.6569°W

- Municipality
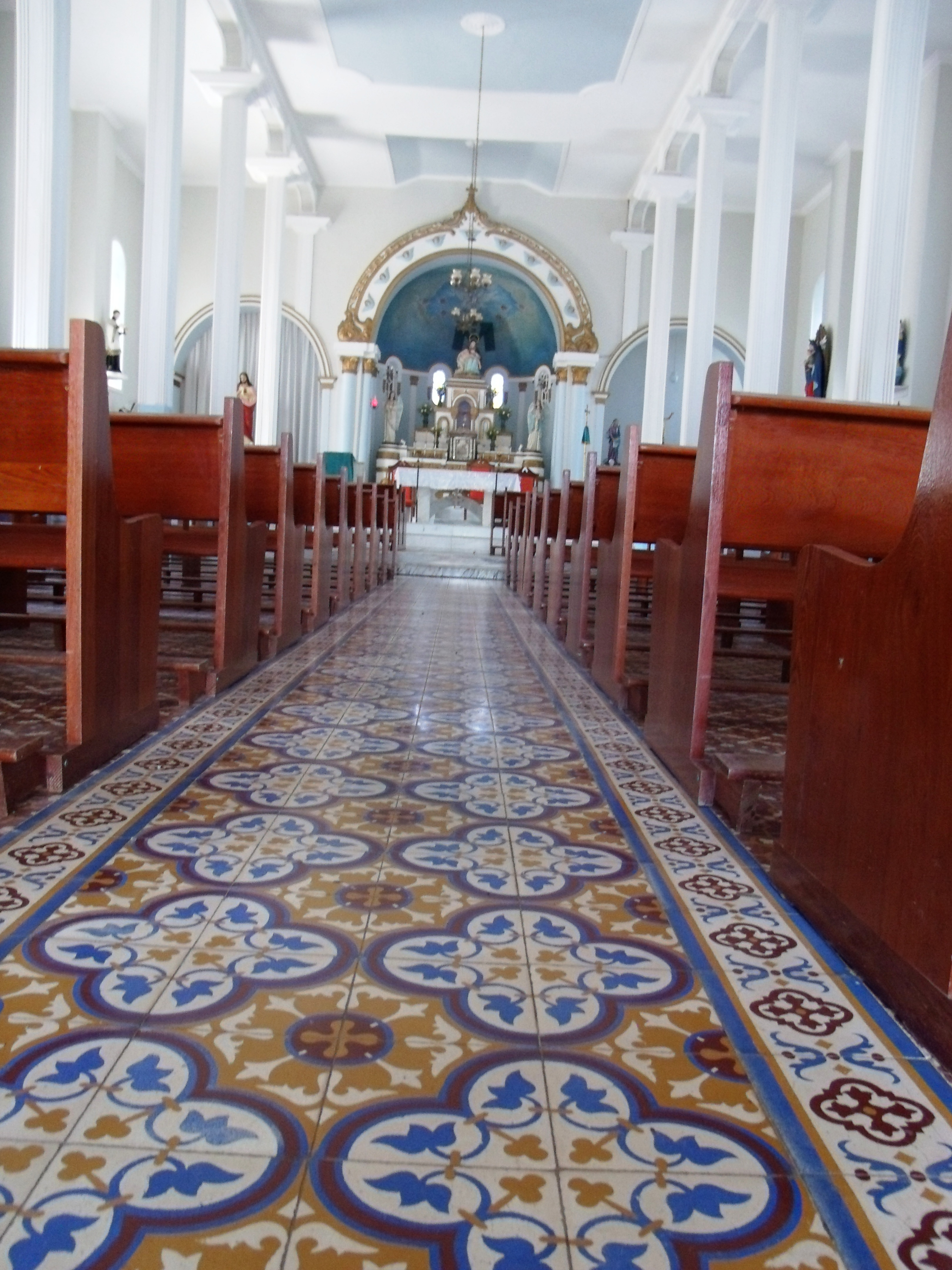

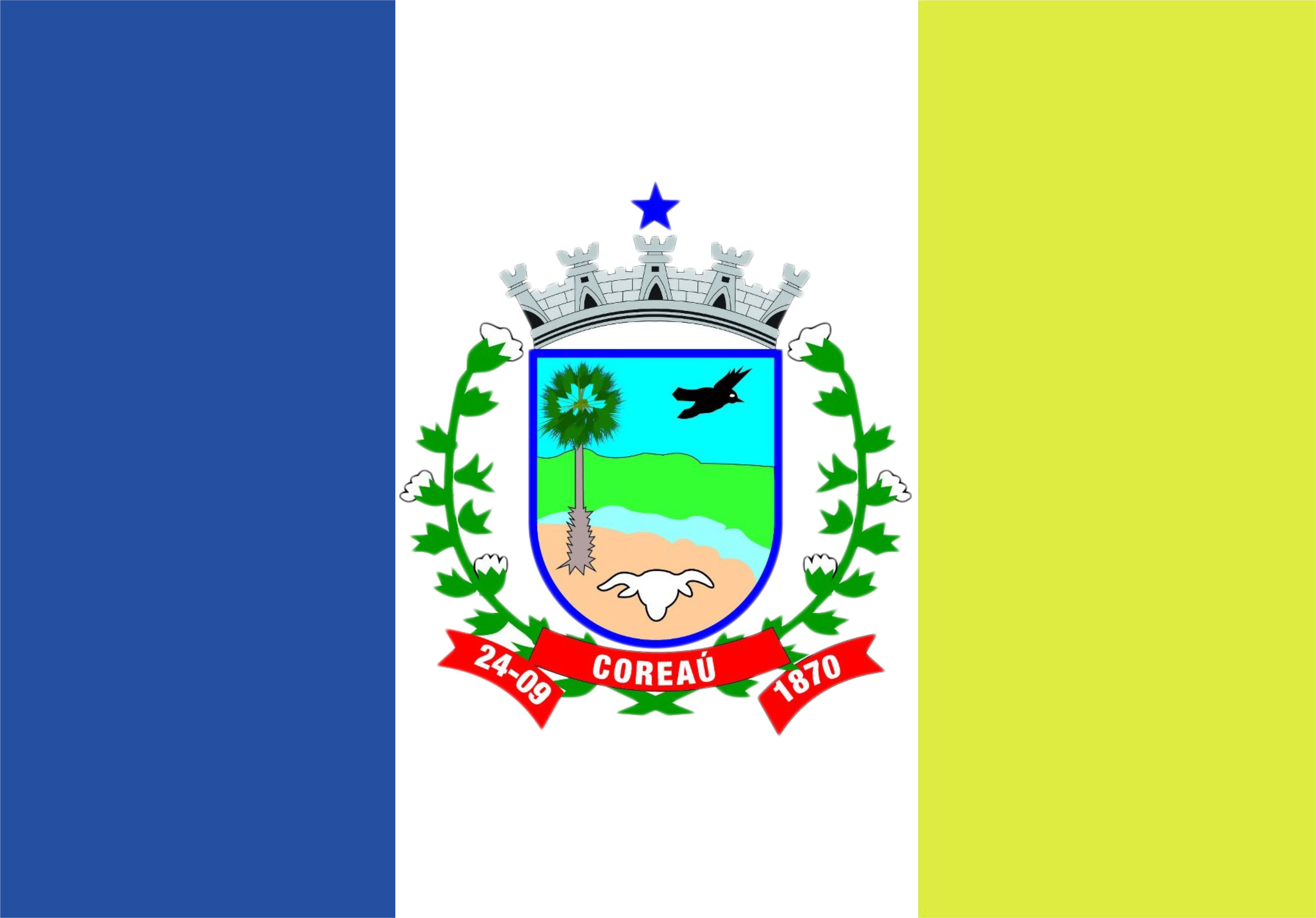
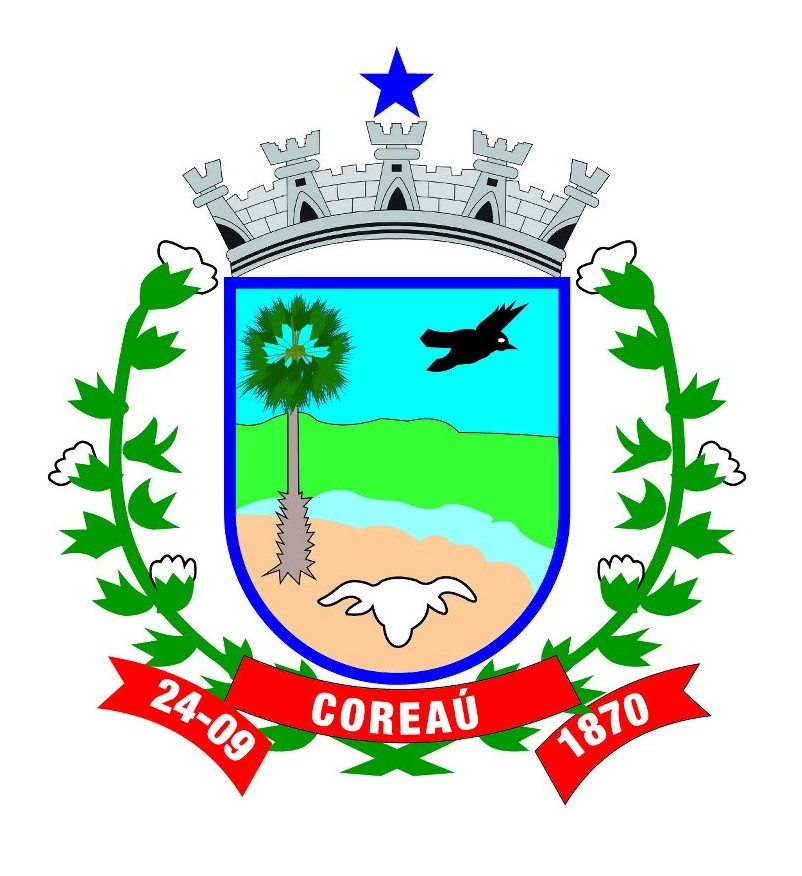
- Flag Coat of arms
- Interactive map of Coreaú
- Country: Brazil
- Region: Nordeste
- State: Ceará
- Mesoregion: Noroeste Cearense

Population (2020)
  - Total: 23,239
- Time zone: UTC−3 (BRT)

Coreaú is a municipality in the state of Ceará in the Northeast region of Brazil.

== See also ==
- List of municipalities in Ceará
