= Alê Portela =

Brazilian politician (born 1988)

Secretary of Social Development of Minas Gerais
- Incumbent
- Assumed office 11 June 2024

Personal details
- Born: 5 February 1988 (age 38)
- Party: Liberal Party (since 2022)

Alessandra Diniz Portela Silveira (born 5 February 1988), better known as Alê Portela, is a Brazilian politician serving as secretary of social development of Minas Gerais since 2024. She has been a member of the Legislative Assembly of Minas Gerais since 2023.
