= Embratur =

Tourism in Brazil

Brazilian Tourist Board
- Portuguese: Agência Brasileira de Turismo

Agency overview
- Formed: 18 November 1966; 58 years ago
- Headquarters: SCN Q2, Bloco G Brasília, Federal District
- Agency executive: Chair, Marcelo Freixo
- Parent department: Ministry of Tourism
- Website: embratur.com.br

Embratur, also known as the Brazilian Tourist Board, is a federal, state-owned agency reporting to the Brazilian Ministry of Tourism. It was formed in 1966 and works exclusively on the promotion, marketing and supporting to the trading of services, products and tourist destinations of Brazil abroad.

Embratur works to promote tourism within Brazil, and has entered agreements with states such as Amazonas and the Federal District. The current president of Embratur is Marcelo Freixo.
