= Diógenes da Silva Matthes =

Brazilian Roman Catholic bishop

- Bishop of Franca
- Church: Catholic Church
- Diocese: Diocese of Franca
- In office: 11 March 1971 – 29 November 2006
- Predecessor: Diocese erected
- Successor: Caetano Ferrari

Orders
- Ordination: 29 June 1957
- Consecration: 11 June 1971 by Umberto Mozzoni

Personal details
- Born: 12 October 1931 Republic of the United States of Brazil
- Died: 20 November 2016 (aged 85)

Diógenes da Silva Matthes (12 October 1931 – 20 November 2016) was a Roman Catholic bishop.

Ordained to the priesthood in 1957, Matthes served as bishop of the Roman Catholic Diocese of Franca, Brazil from 1971 to 2006.
